= Isfahan =

City in Isfahan province, Iran

Isfahan اصفهان (Persian) Sepahan, Aspadana, Espandana
- City
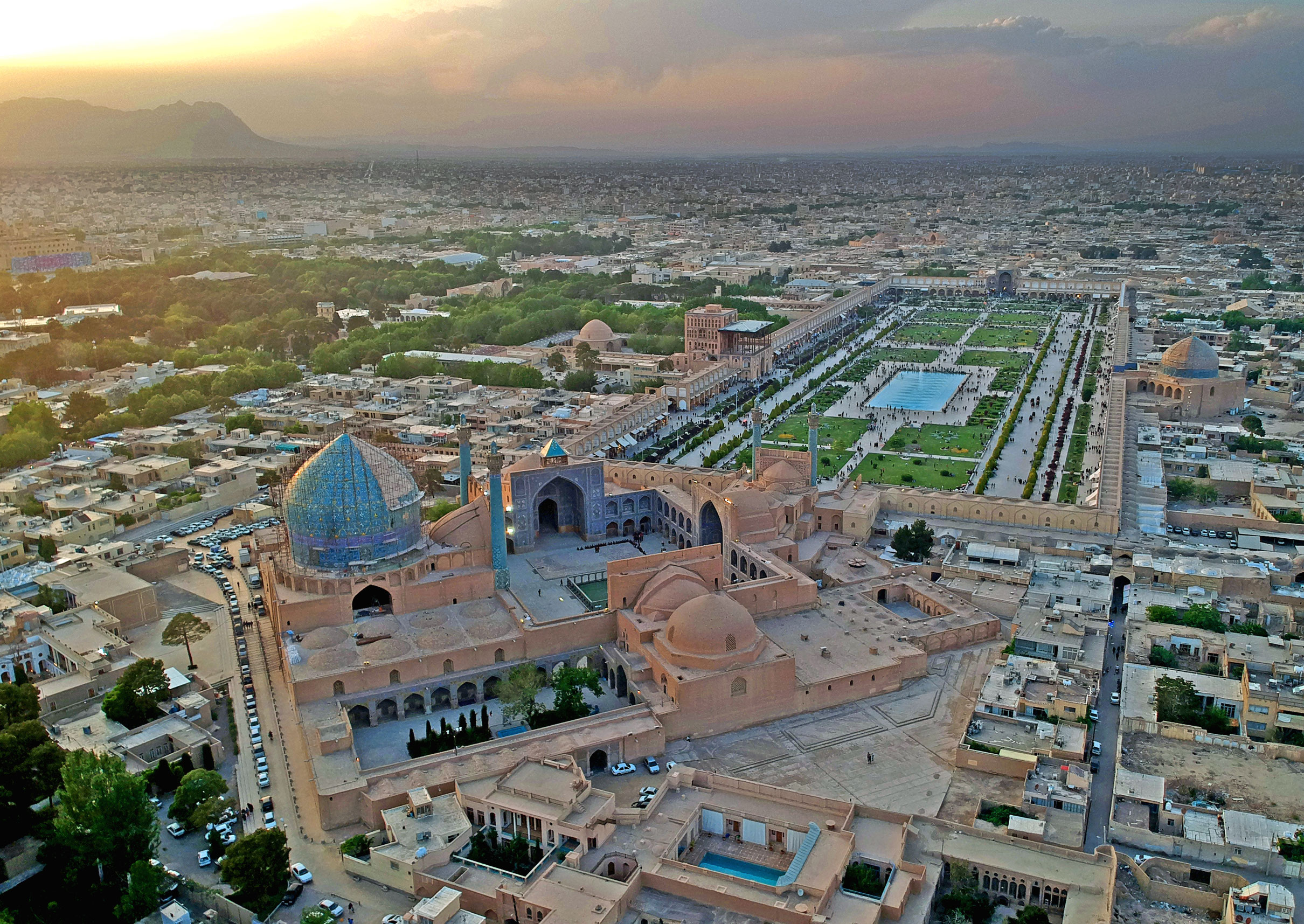
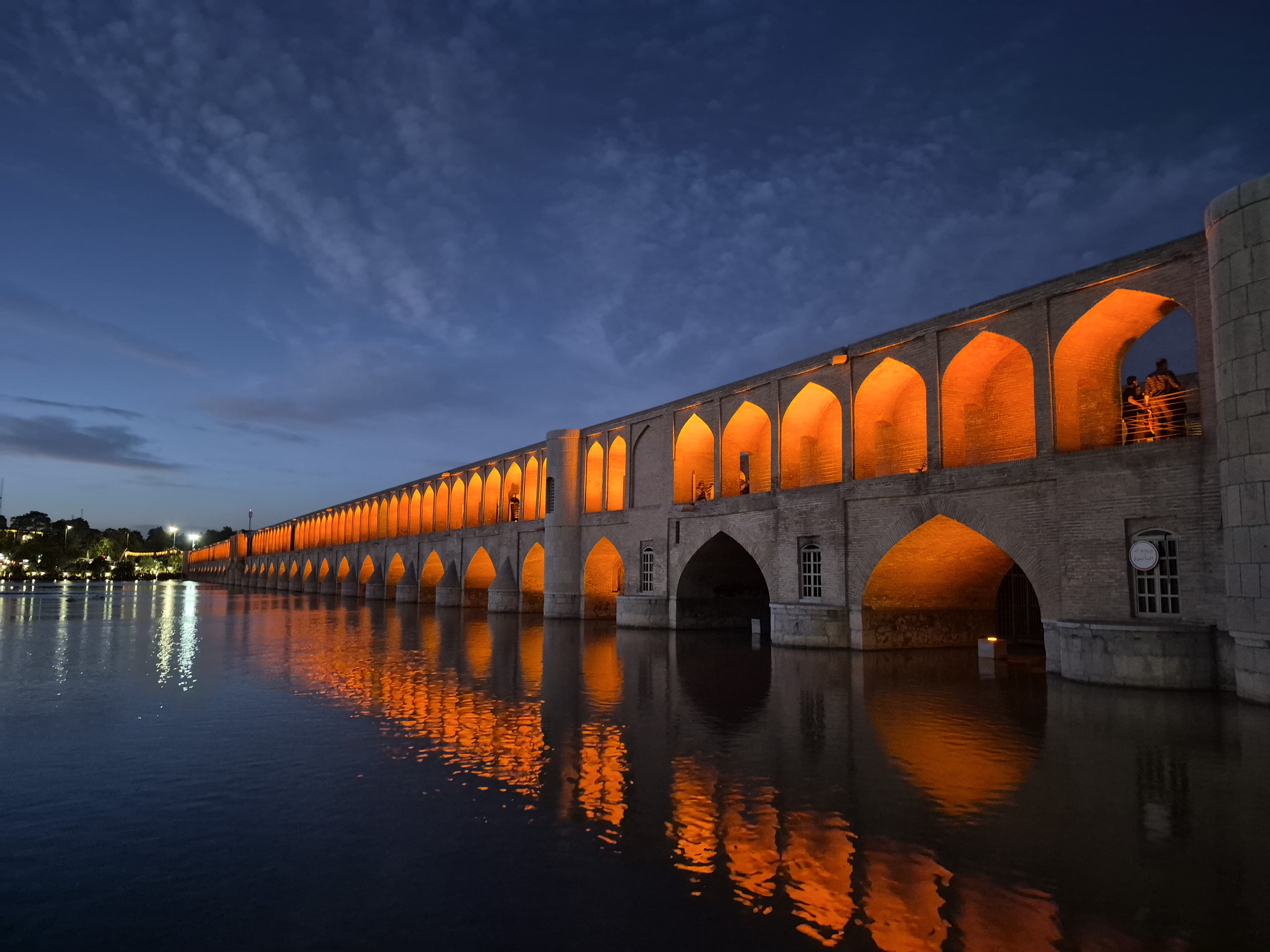
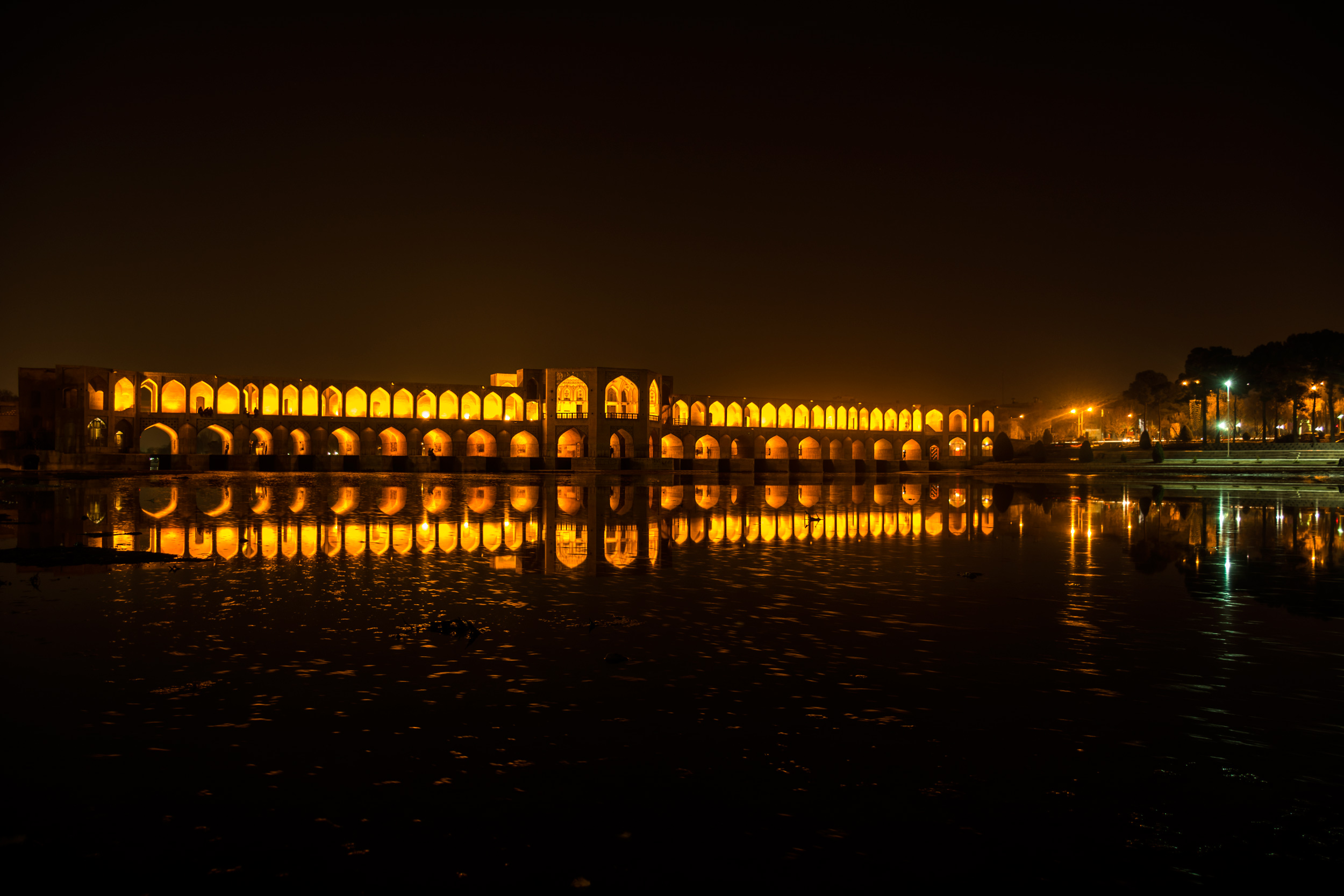
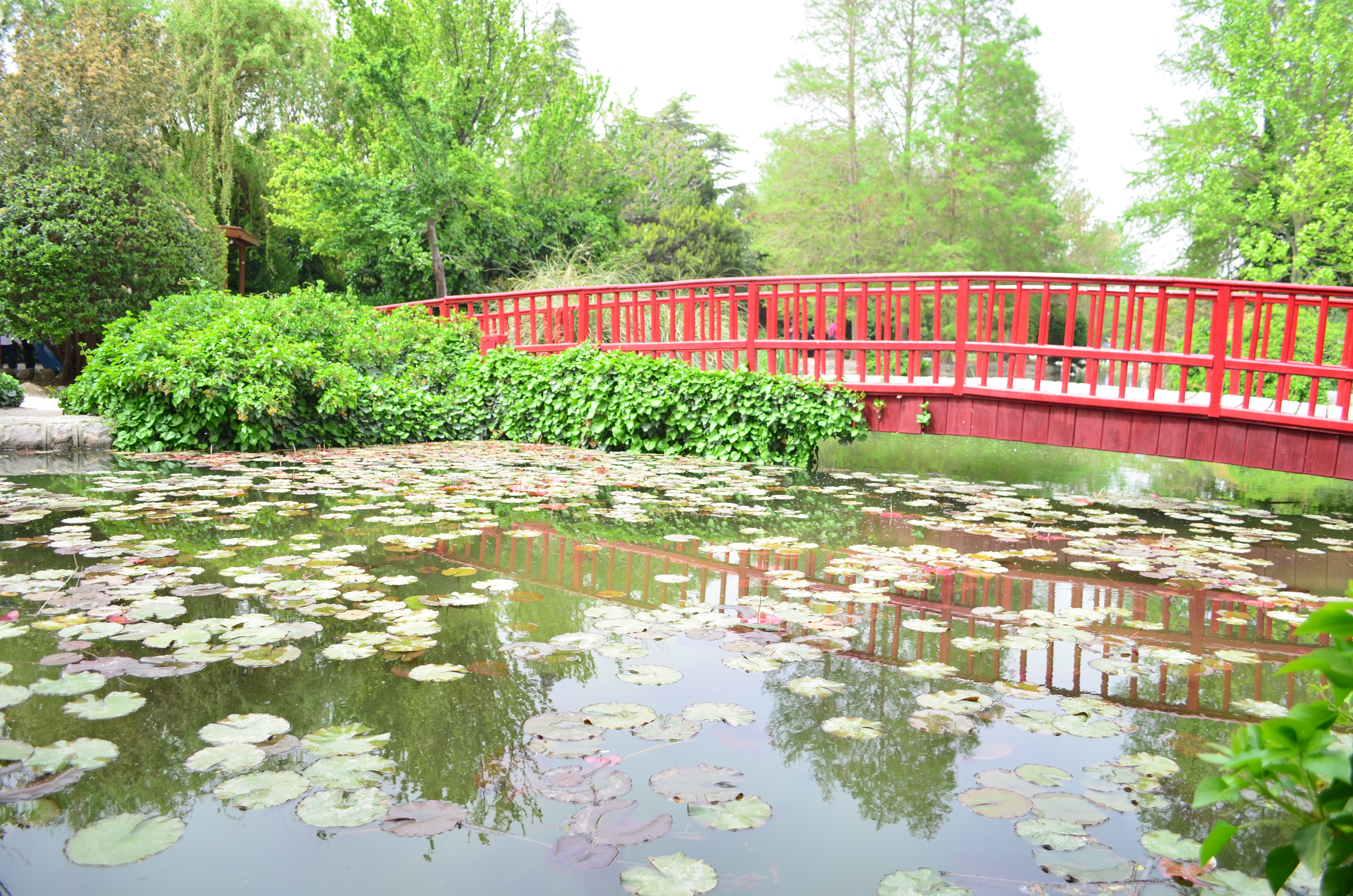
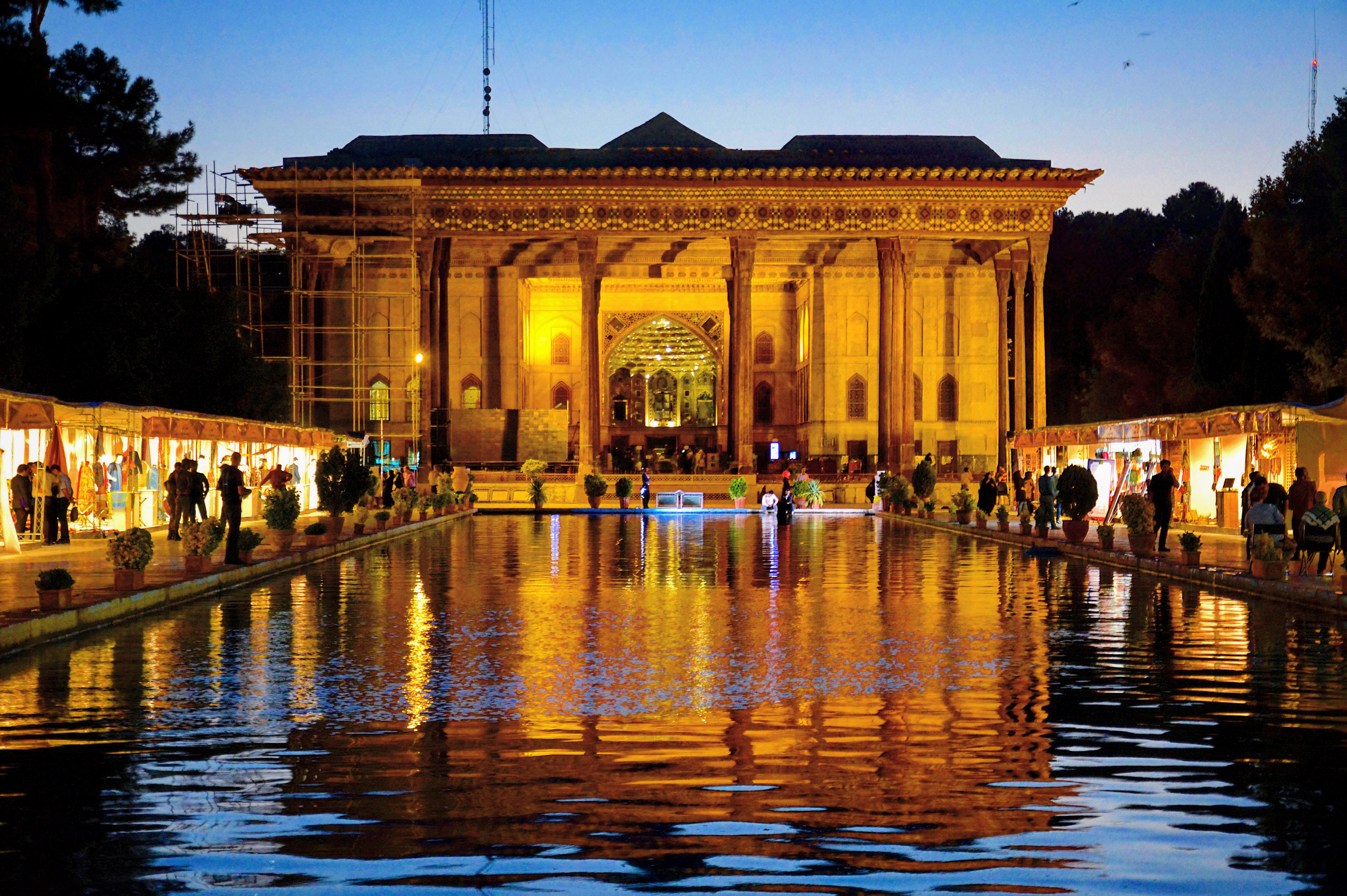
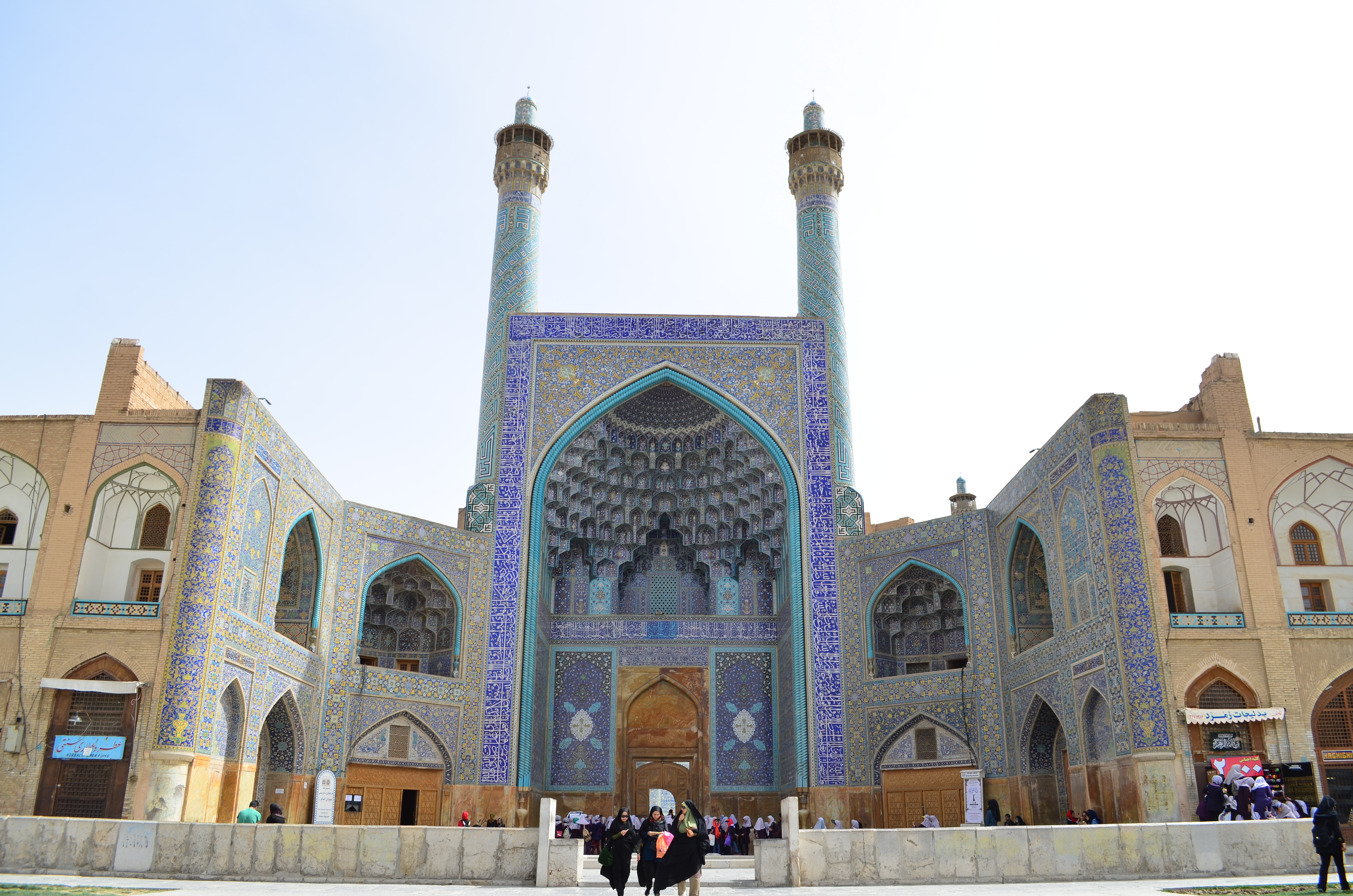
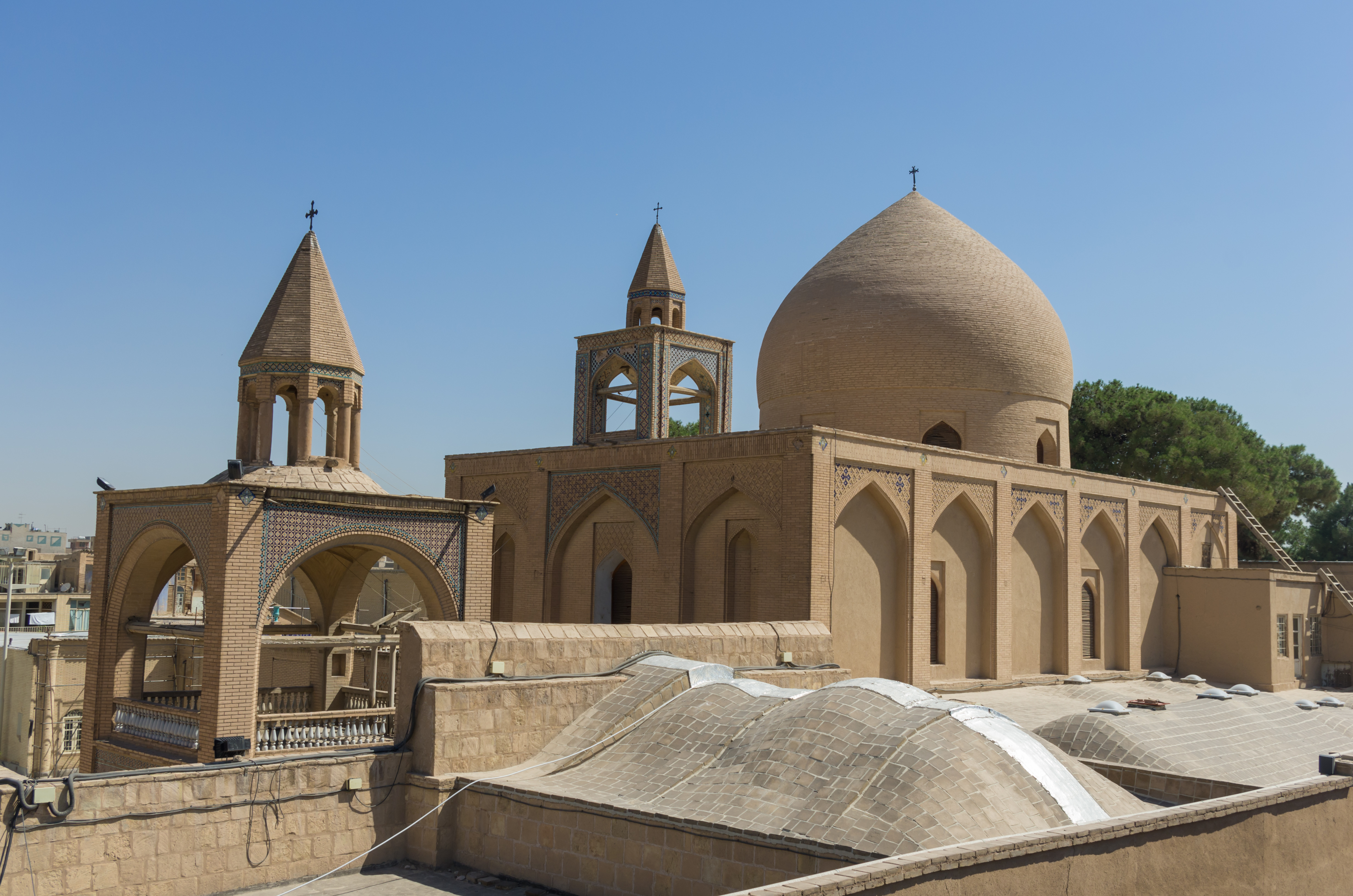
- A view of the city and Naqsh-e Jahan Square Si-o-se-pol Khaju Bridge Flower Garden of Isfahan Chehel Sotoun Shah Mosque Vank Cathedral

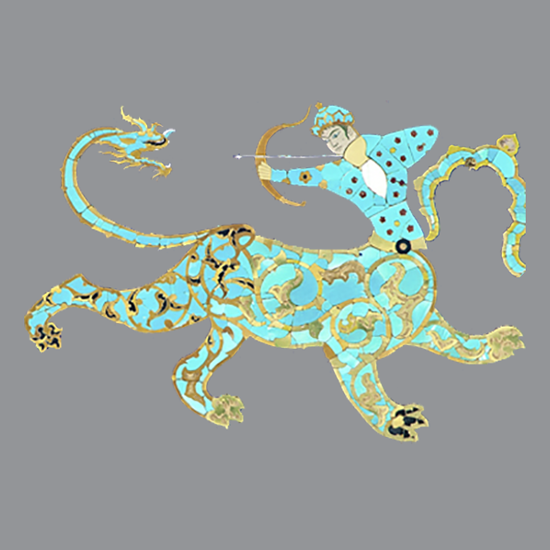
- Seal Coat of arms Flag
- Nickname: Half of the World (نصف جهان, Nesfe Jahân)
- A map of the Isfahan administrative area
- Location in Iran Isfahan (West and Central Asia)
- Coordinates: 32°39′55″N 51°40′13″E
- Country: Iran
- Province: Isfahan
- County: Isfahan
- District: Central

Government
  - Mayor: Ali Ghasemzadeh
  - City Council: Mohammad Nour Salehi (Chairman)

Area
  - Urban: 551 km^{2} (213 sq mi)
- Elevation: 1,574 m (5,164 ft)

Population (2025)
  - City: 2,238,000
  - Density: 4,000/km^{2} (10,400/sq mi)
  - Urban: 2,219,343
  - Metro: 3,989,070
  - Metro rank: 2nd

GDP (Nominal, 2024)
  - City: US$23.2 billion
  - Per capita: US$10,100
- Time zone: UTC+3:30 (IRST)
- Area code: 031
- Climate: BWk
- Website: isfahan.ir

Isfahan (Persian: اصفهان [esfæˈhɒːn]) (Note: Also spelled Ispahan, Esfahan or Espahan.) is a city in the Central District of Isfahan County, Isfahan Province, Iran. It is the capital of the province, the county, and the district. It is located 440 kilometres (270 miles) south of Tehran. The city has a population of approximately 2,238,000, making it the third-most populous city in Iran, after Tehran and Mashhad, and the second-largest metropolitan area.

Isfahan is located at the intersection of the two principal routes that traverse Iran, north–south and east–west. Isfahan flourished between the 9th and 18th centuries. Under the Safavid Empire, Isfahan became the capital of Iran, for the second time in its history, under Abbas the Great. It is known for its Persian–Muslim architecture, grand boulevards, covered bridges, palaces, tiled mosques, and minarets.

Isfahan has many historical buildings, monuments, paintings, and artifacts. The fame of Isfahan led to the Persian proverb Esfahān nesf-e-jahān ast ('Isfahan is half the world'). Naqsh-e Jahan Square in Isfahan is one of the largest city squares in the world, and a UNESCO World Heritage Site.

== Etymology ==
The name Ispahan is derived from Middle Persian Spahān, which is attested by various Middle Persian seals and inscriptions, including that of the Zoroastrian magus Kartir.

The region is denoted by the abbreviation GD (Southern Media) on Sasanian coins. In Ptolemy's Geographia, it appears as Aspadana (Ἀσπαδανα) or Aspazana (Ασπαζάνα), which translates to "place of gathering for the army". It is believed that Spahān is derived from spādānām 'the armies', the Old Persian plural of spāda, from which is derived spāh (𐭮𐭯𐭠𐭧) 'army' and spahi (سپاهی, 'soldier', literally 'of the army') in Middle Persian. Some of the other ancient names include Gey, Jey (old form Zi), Partakān(Paraetacene),Park, and Judea.

== History ==
Human habitation in the Isfahan region can be traced back to the Palaeolithic period. Archaeologists have found artifacts dating back to the Palaeolithic, Mesolithic, Neolithic, Bronze, and Iron ages. During Median rule, Isfahan became a regional centre, especially due to the benefits of the Zayandehrud River. It was a religiously and ethnically diverse city during the reign of Cyrus the Great, and exhibited religious tolerance.

The Muslim Arabs captured Isfahan in 642 CE. They made it the capital of al-Jibal province. The city further grew under the Buyid and Seljuk dynasties. After the fall of the Seljuks in 1200 CE, the city temporarily declined. It regained its importance during the Safavid era (1501–1736), with the city experiencing a golden age under the rule of Abbas the Great, who moved his capital from Qazvin to Isfahan. During his reign, Turkish, Armenian, and Persian craftsmen were forcefully resettled in the city to ensure its prosperity. Later, the city also had enclaves for people of Georgian, Circassian, and Daghestani descent.

In the 20th century, Isfahan was resettled by many people from southern Iran, especially during the population migrations at the start of the century and in the 1980s following the Iran–Iraq War.

=== Median and Achaemenid era ===
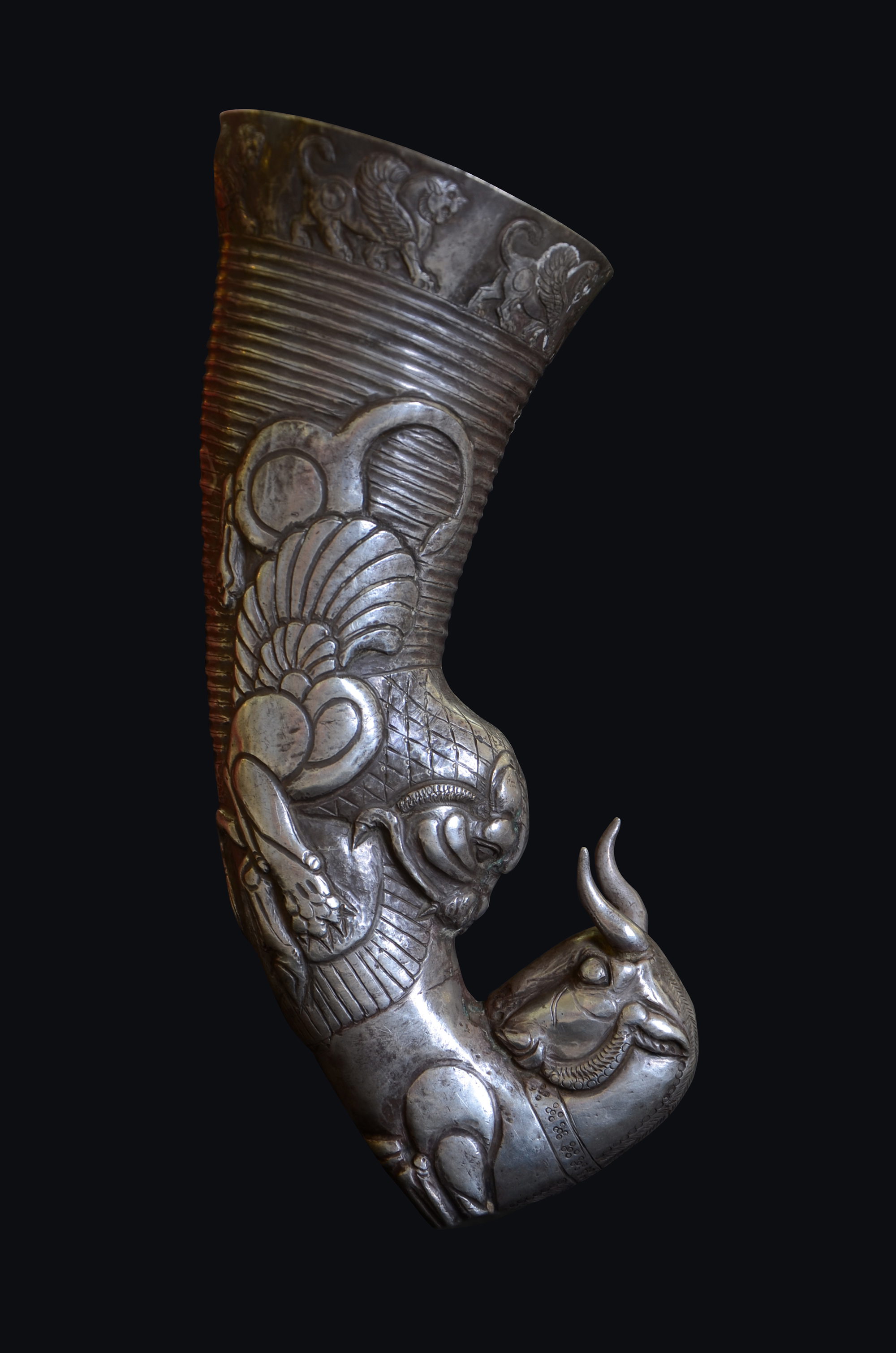
An ancient artifact from Isfahan City Center museum

Under Median rule, the commercial entrepôt began to show signs of more sedentary urbanism, growing into a regional centre that benefited from the fertile soil on the banks of the Zayandehrud River, in a region called Aspandana or Ispandana.

When Cyrus the Great unified Persian and Median lands into the Achaemenid Empire, the religiously and ethnically diverse city of Isfahan became an early example of the king's fabled religious tolerance. Having just taken Babylon, Cyrus made an edict in 538 BCE declaring that Jews in Babylon could return to Jerusalem. Later, some of the Jewish immigrants settled in Isfahan instead of returning to their homeland. The 10th century Persian historian Ibn al-Faqih wrote:

When the Jews emigrated from Jerusalem, fleeing from Nebuchadnezzar, they carried with them a sample of the water and soil of Jerusalem. They did not settle until they reached the city of Isfahan, whose soil and water was deemed to resemble that of Jerusalem. Thereupon they settled there, cultivated the soil, raised children and grandchildren, and today the name of this settlement is Yahudia.

=== Parthian era ===
The Parthians (247 BCE – 224 CE) continued the tradition of tolerance after the fall of the Achaemenids, fostering both a Hellenistic dimension within Iranian culture and the political organization introduced by Alexander the Great's invading armies. Under the Parthians, Arsacid governors administered the provinces of the nation from Isfahan, and the city's urban development accelerated to accommodate the needs of a capital city.

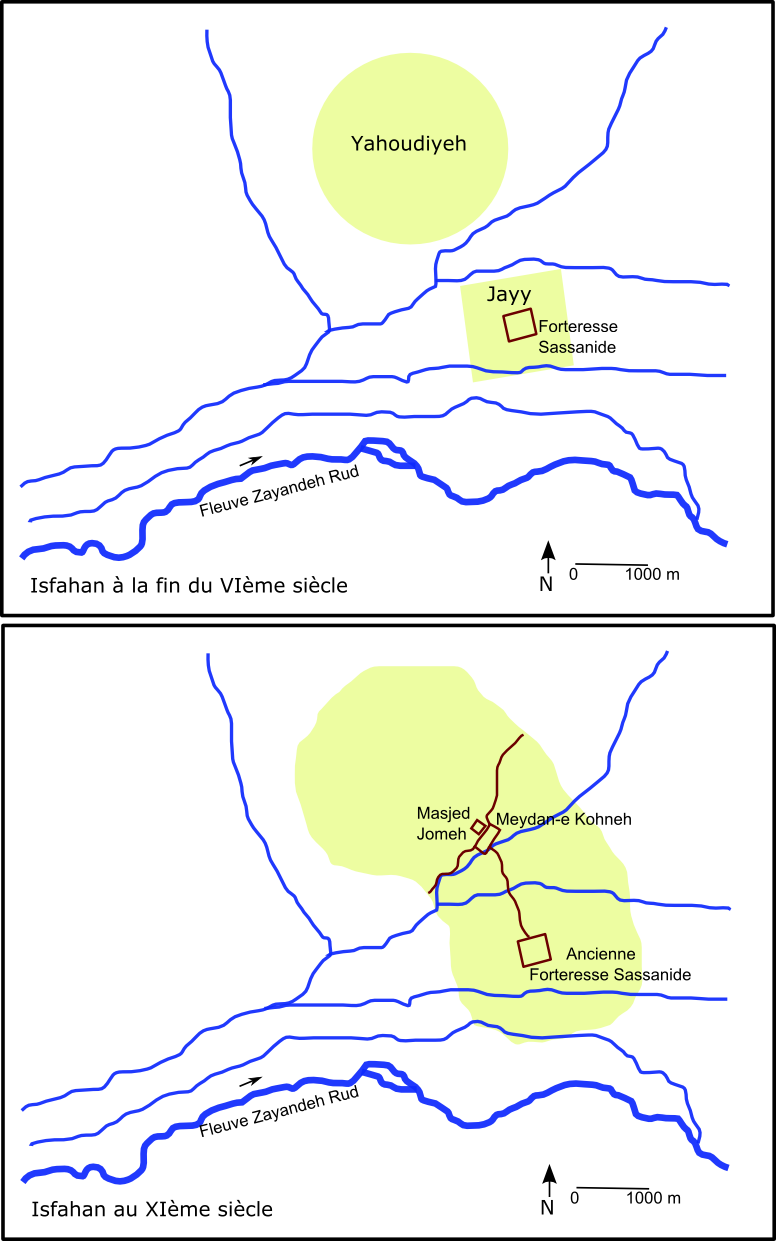
Isfahan at the end of the 6th century (top), consisting of two separate areas: Sassanid Jay and Jewish Yahudia. In the 11th century (bottom), these two areas were completely merged.

=== Sassanid era ===
The Sassanid Empire (224–651 CE) presided over massive changes in their realm, instituting sweeping agricultural reforms and reviving Iranian culture and the Zoroastrian religion. Both the city and region were then called by the name Aspahan or Spahan. The city was governed by a group called the Espoohrans, who descended from seven noble Iranian families. Extant foundations of some Sassanid-era bridges in Isfahan suggest that the Sasanian kings were fond of ambitious urban-planning projects.

While Isfahan's political importance declined during this period, many Sassanid princes studied statecraft in the city, and its military role increased. Its strategic location at the intersection of the ancient roads to Susa and Persepolis made it an ideal candidate to house a standing army, which would be ready to march against Constantinople at any moment. The names Aspahan and Spahan are derived from the Pahlavi or Middle Persian meaning 'the place of the army'.

Although many theories have mentioned the origins of Isfahan, little is known of it before the rule of the Sasanian dynasty. Historical records suggest that, in the late 4th and early 5th centuries, Queen Shushandukht – the Jewish wife of emperor Yazdegerd I (reigned 399–420) and mother of his successor Bahram V – settled a colony of Jewish immigrants in Yahudiyyeh (also spelled Yahudiya and Jouybareh). The settlement was 3 kilometres (1.9 mi) northwest of the Zoroastrian city of Isfahan, then known by the Achaemid and Parthian name Gabae.

Gabai was its Sasanic name, which was shortened to Gay (Arabic Jay). It was located on the northern bank of the Zayanderud River. The colony's establishment has also been attributed to Nebuchadrezzar, though that is unlikely.

After the Arab conquest of Iran, the gradual population decrease of Gay, and the simultaneous population increase of Yahudiyyeh and its suburbs, resulted in the formation of the nucleus of what was to become the city of Isfahan. The names Aspadana, Ispadana, Spahan, and Sepahan, from which the modern name Isfahan is derived, referred to the region in which the city was located.

Isfahan and Gay were reportedly both circular in design, a characteristic of Parthian and Sasanian cities. However, this reported Sasanian circular city of Isfahan has not yet been uncovered.

=== Muslim conquest ===
When the Arabs captured Isfahan in 642 CE, they made it the capital of al-Jabal province, an area that covered much of ancient Media. Isfahan grew prosperous under the Persian Buyid dynasty, which came to rule much of Iran when the temporal authority of the Abbasid leaders waned in the 10th century. The city walls of Isfahan are thought to have been constructed during the tenth century. The Turkish conqueror and founder of the Seljuq dynasty, Toghril Beg, made Isfahan the capital of his domains in the mid-11th century; the city grew in size and splendour under his grandson Malik-Shah I (r. 1073–92).

After the fall of the Seljuks (c. 1200), Isfahan temporarily declined and was eclipsed by other Iranian cities, such as Tabriz and Qazvin.

=== Timurid era ===
During his visit in 1327, Ibn Battuta noted that "The city of Isfahan is one of the largest and fairest of cities, but it is now in ruins for the greater part." In 1387, Isfahan surrendered to the warlord Timur. Initially treated with relative mercy, the city revolted against Timur's punitive taxes by killing the tax collectors and some of Timur's soldiers. In retribution, Timur ordered the massacre of the city residents; his soldiers reportedly killing 70,000 citizens. An eyewitness counted more than 28 towers, each constructed of about 1,500 heads.

=== Safavid era ===
Isfahan regained its importance during the Safavid era (1501–1736). The city's golden age began in 1598 when the Safavid ruler Abbas the Great (reigned 1588–1629) made it his capital and rebuilt it into one of the largest cities of the 17th-century. In 1598, he moved his capital from Qazvin to the more central Isfahan. He introduced policies increasing Iranian involvement in the Silk Road trade. Turkish, Armenian, and Persian craftsmen were forcefully resettled in the city to ensure its prosperity. Their contributions to the economic vitality of the city supported the recovery of Safavid prestige after earlier losses to the Ottomans and Qizilbash tribes.

During Abbas's reign, as many as 300,000 Armenians (primarily from Jugha) were forcefully resettled; some were brought to Isfahan. He ordered the establishment of a new quarter for these resettled Armenians from Old Julfa, and thus the Armenian Quarter of Isfahan was named New Julfa. Today, it is one of the largest Armenian quarters in the world.

Abbas also oversaw a transformation of the urban pattern of Isfahan. The plans included the new, rectangular Shah Square and the linear Chahar Bagh Boulevard. Between these two focal points of Isfahan's urban revitalization was a large garden, today the gardens of Hasht Behesht. The new, geometric, planned portions of Isfahan stood out from the old city's complex street layouts, attracting foreign emissaries and wealthy residents along the Chahar Bagh. Shah Square would be adorned by 4 grand monuments on each side. To the north, a turquoise gate connected the new square to Isfahan's Grand Bazaar and old square; to the south, the Shah Mosque became the new primary place of worship for city residents.

The royal court in Isfahan had a great number of Georgian ḡolāms (military servants), as well as Georgian women. Although they spoke both Persian and Turkic, their mother tongue was Georgian. Now the city had enclaves of those of Georgian, Circassian, and Daghistani descent. Engelbert Kaempfer, who dwelt in Safavid Iran in 1684–85, estimated their number at 20,000.

During Abbas's reign, Isfahan became known in Europe, and European travellers, such as Jean Chardin, gave accounts of their visits to the city. The city was sacked by Central Asian invaders in 1722, during a marked decline in Safavid influence. Thereafter, Isfahan experienced a decline in importance, culminating in the capital being moved to Mashhad during the Afsharid era. Subsequently, the capital moved to Shiraz during the Zand era, and finally to Tehran in 1775, by Agha Mohammad Khan Qajar, the founder of the Qajar dynasty.

In the early years of the 19th century, efforts were made to preserve some of Isfahan's archeologically important buildings. The work was started by Mohammad Hossein Khan, during the reign of Fath-Ali Shah Qajar.

=== Modern age ===
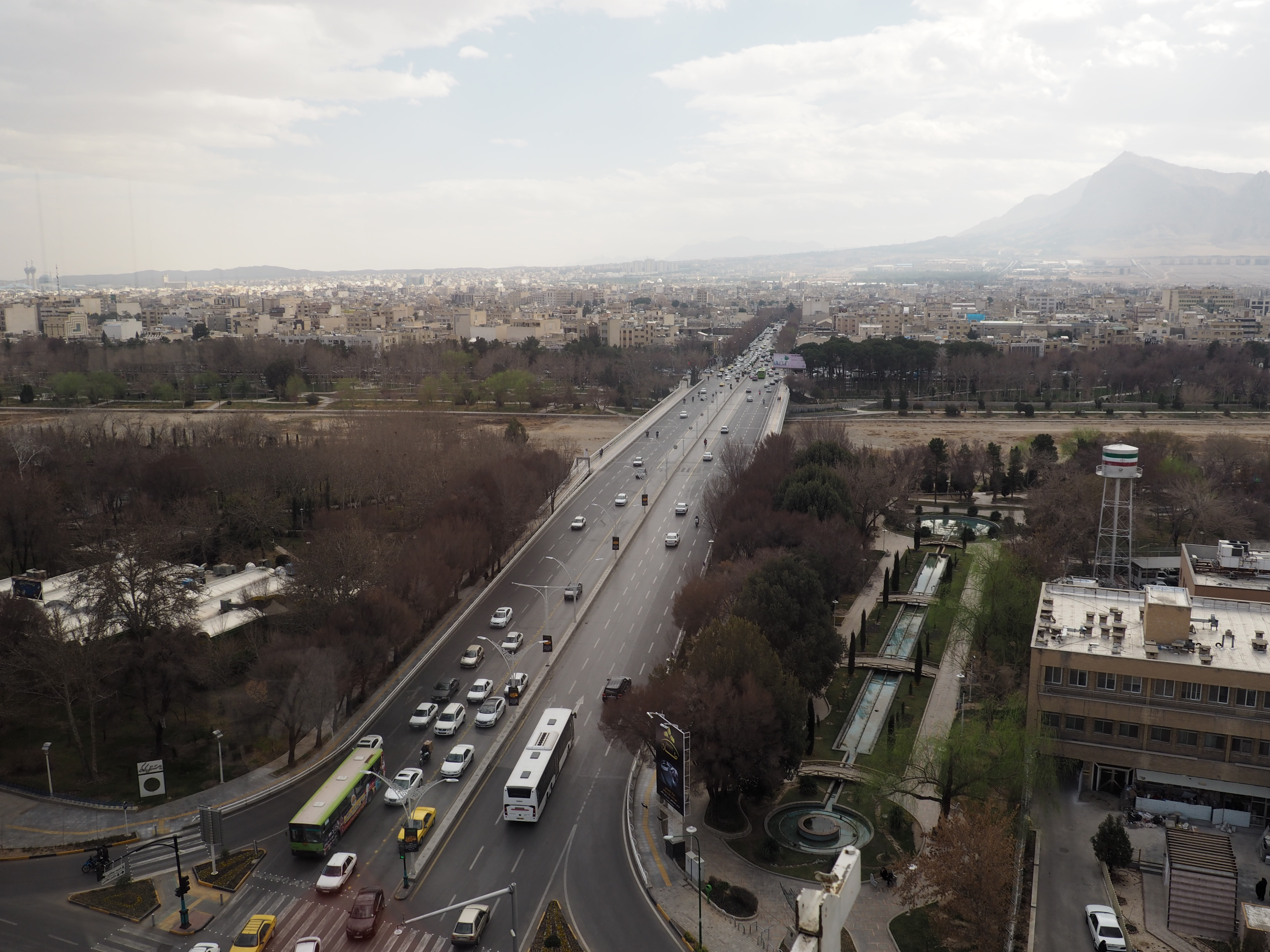
Street from above

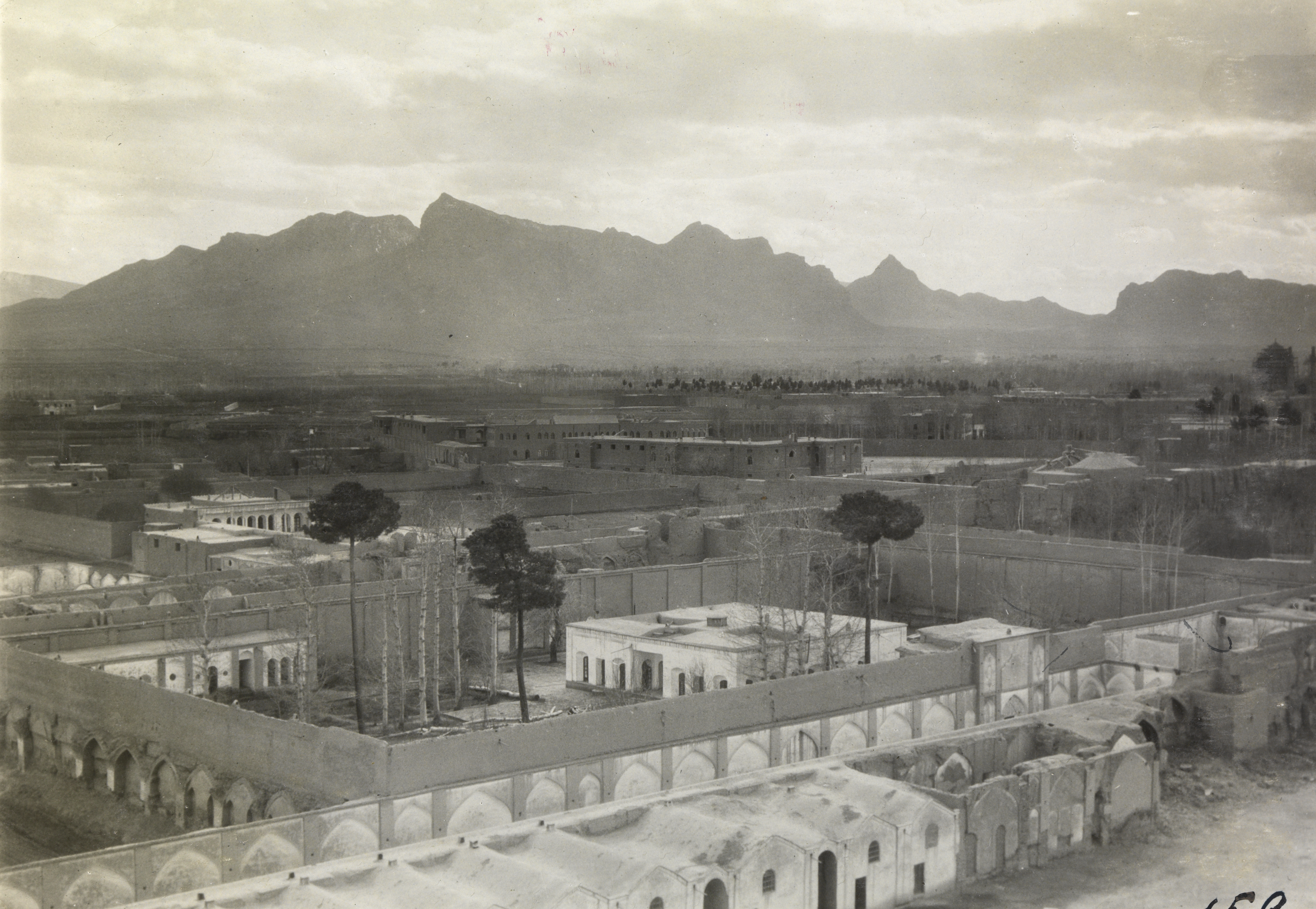
Isfahan in 1924

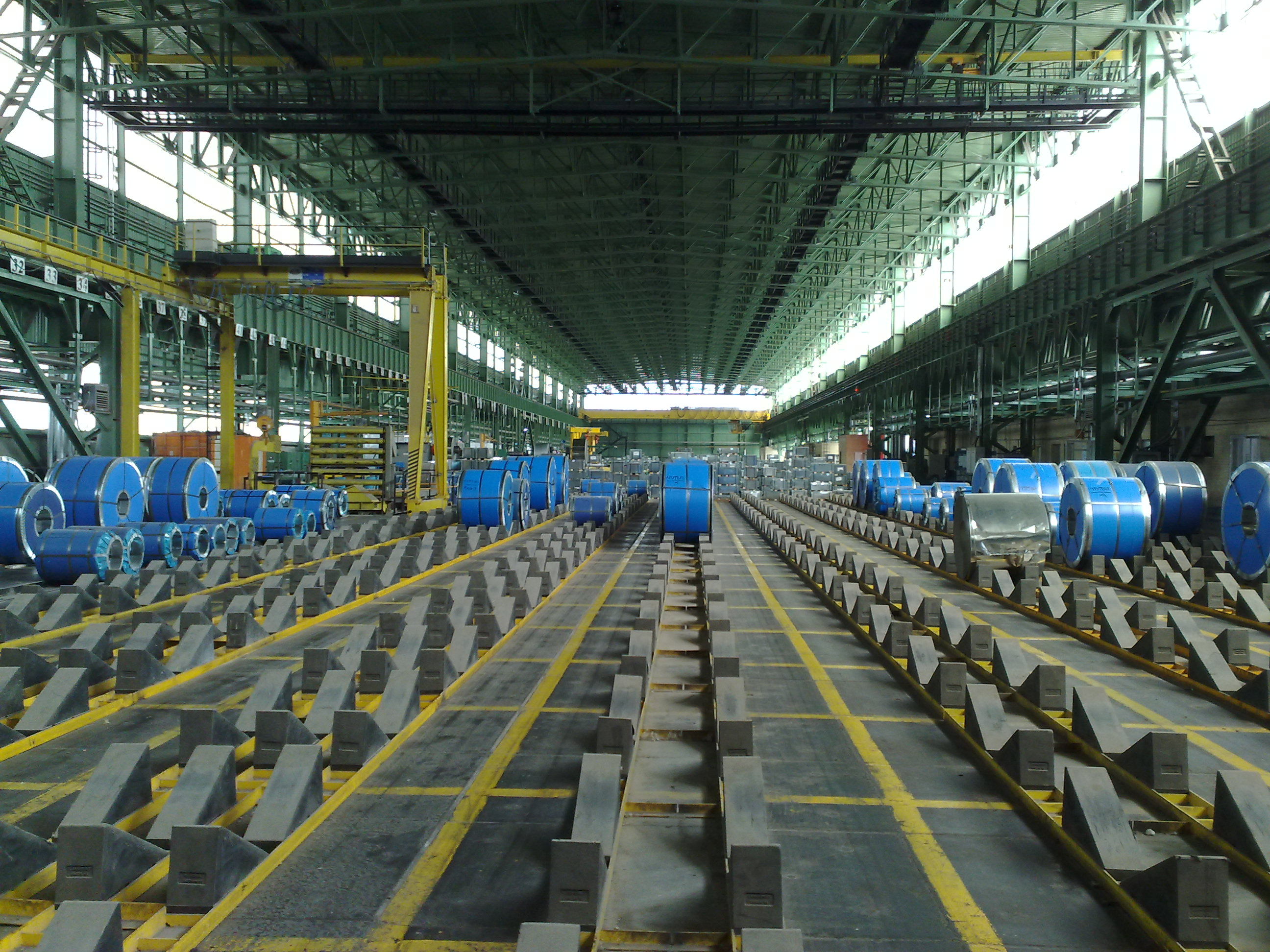
Foolad Mobarakeh Steel Mill

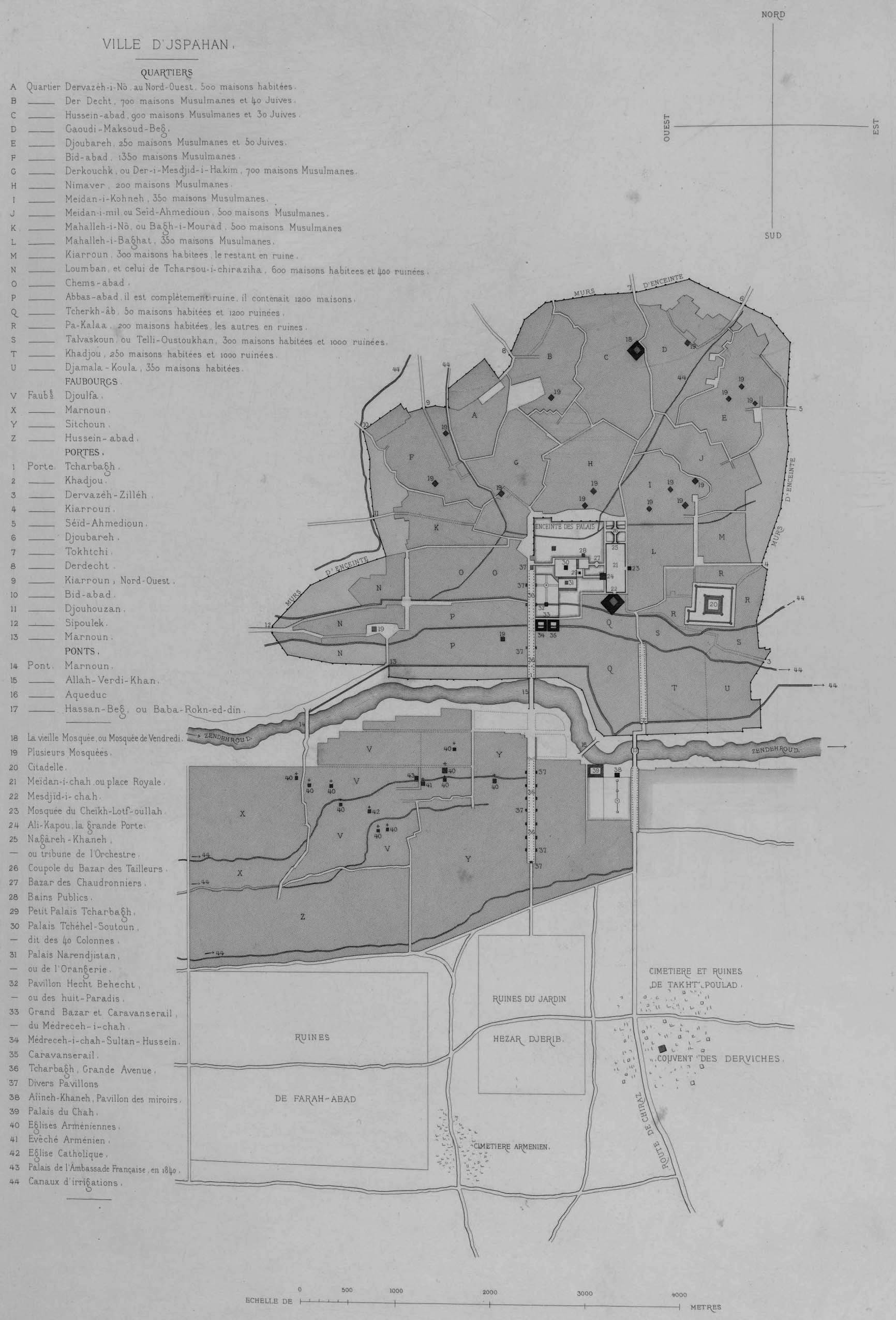
Map of Isfahan by Pascal Coste

In the 20th century, Isfahan was resettled by many people from southern Iran. Many came during the migrations at the start of the century, and in the 1980s following the Iran–Iraq War. During the war, 23,000 people from Isfahan were killed, and there were 43,000 veterans.

In 1921, the first telephone office was created on Shams Abadi street.

During World War II, Polish refugees, mostly children, were admitted in Isfahan. There were 21 Polish childcare units, located in different parts of the city. Some 2,600 Poles were housed there as of February 1943. Over time, Polish children were evacuated further to Africa, India and New Zealand.

The city has had four master development programs. The first was created in 1971 by a German engineering firm that designed checkered streets.

Today, Isfahan produces carpets, textiles, steel, handicrafts, and traditional foods, including sweets. Isfahan is noted for its production of the Isfahan rug, a type of Persian rug typically made of merino wool and silk.

There are nuclear experimental reactors as well as uranium conversion facilities (UCF) for producing nuclear fuel in the environs of the city. There is a major oil refinery and a large air force base outside the city. HESA, Iran's most advanced aircraft manufacturing plant, is located just outside the city. Isfahan was also attracting international investment as of 2014. Isfahan hosted the International Physics Olympiad in 2007.

In 2023, 200 loudspeakers were installed in the city by the government to play the azān. The municipality created a tourism app called Isfahanema. As of 2023, several public housing projects were being built.

In 2018, farmers in Isfahan protested for their water rights, amidst ongoing water shortages. They protested against the mismanagement and anti-American ideology of the Iranian government, chanting "Our enemy is here, they are lying that it is America", and "Front toward homeland back to enemy in Friday prayers".

== Geography ==
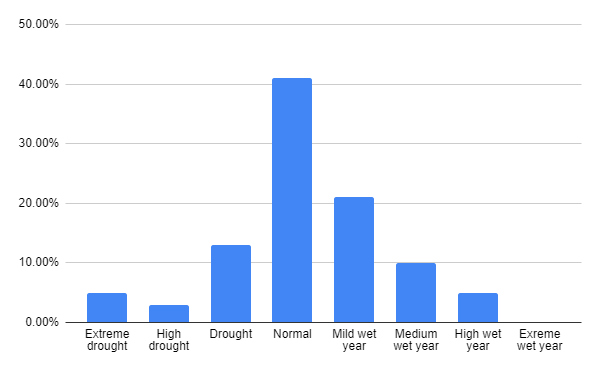
The distribution of drought, normal, and wet years – 1972 to 2009, Isfahan atlas

The city is located on the plain of the Zayandeh River and the foothills of the Zagros Mountains. The nearest mountain is Mount Soffeh, just south of the city.

=== Hydrography ===
An artificial network of canals, whose components are called madi, were built during the Safavid dynasty for channeling water from the Zayandeh River into different parts of the city. Designed by Sheikh Bahaï, an engineer of Shah Abbas, the network has 77 madis in the northern course of the river, and 71 in the southern course. As of 1993, 91% of the centuries-old network's water was being used for agriculture purposes, 4% for industrial purposes, and 5% for domestic purposes. 70 emergency wells were dug in 2018 to avoid water shortages.

=== Ecological issues ===
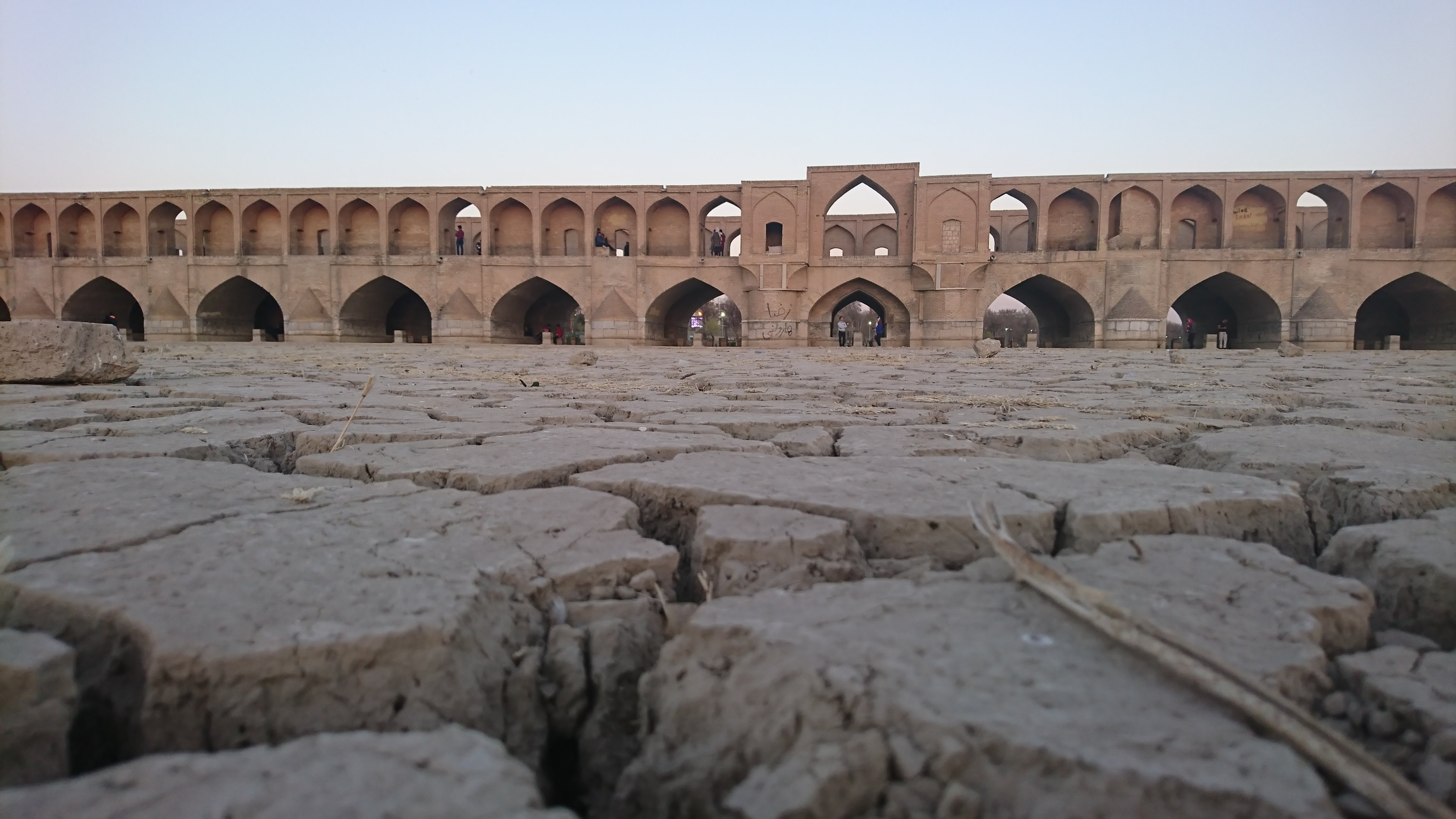
The dry Zayanderud river with Si-o-se-pol in the background in 2018

Towns and villages around Isfahan have emptied out due to drought and water diversion. An anonymous journalist said that what is called drought is more often the mismanagement of water. The subsidence rate is dire, and the aquifer level decreases by one meter annually.

As of 2020, the city had the worst air quality among major Iranian cities.

=== Flora and fauna ===
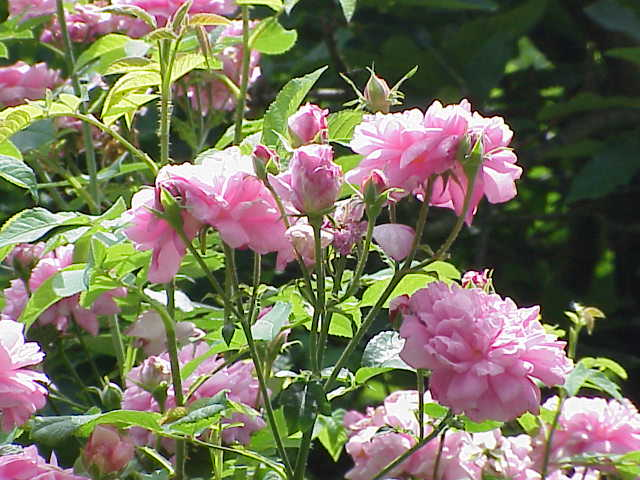
Rosa 'Ispahan'

The Damask rose cultivar Rosa 'Ispahan' is named after the city. The mole cricket is one of the major pests of plants, especially grass roots. By 2023, the city's green space was dying because of a water shortage; while trees need 150 liters, only 0.7 liters of gray recycled water were available. There is a program to plant Celtis australis and oak trees.

Cows endemic to Isfahan became extinct in 2020. Wagtails are often seen in farmlands and parks. Sheep and rams are symbols of Isfahan.

=== Climate ===
Situated at 1,590 metres (5,217 ft) above sea level on the eastern side of the Zagros Mountains, Isfahan has a cold desert climate (Köppen BWk). No geological obstacles exist within 90 kilometres (56 miles) north of the city, allowing cool winds to blow from this direction. Despite its altitude, Isfahan remains hot during the summer, with maxima typically around 35 °C (95 °F). With low humidity and moderate temperatures at night, the climate is quite pleasant.

During the winter, days are cool while nights can be very cold. Snow falls an average of 6.7 days each winter. Isfahan's climate is semi-arid. Its annual precipitation of 135 millimetres (5.3 in)

The Zayande River starts in the Zagros Mountains, flowing from the west through the heart of the city, then dissipates in the Gavkhouni wetland. Planting olive trees in the city is economically viable because such trees can survive water shortages.

The highest recorded temperature was 43 °C (109 °F) on 11 July 2001. The lowest recorded temperature was −19.4 °C (−3 °F) on 16 January 1996.

In July and August 2024, Isfahan experienced a notable heatwave during which unusually high temperatures were recorded. Reported meteorological data indicated a maximum temperature of 44.6 °C on July 28, exceeding the city’s previous recorded high of 43 °C. Temperatures above 43 °C were observed for several consecutive days during this period.

Climate data for Isfahan (1991–2020, records 1951-present)
Month	Jan	Feb	Mar	Apr	May	Jun	Jul	Aug	Sep	Oct	Nov	Dec	Year
Record high °C (°F)	20.8 (69.4)	26.9 (80.4)	30.0 (86.0)	35.3 (95.5)	39.4 (102.9)	42.1 (107.8)	44.6 (112.3)	43.8 (110.8)	39.4 (102.9)	34.0 (93.2)	27.5 (81.5)	23.4 (74.1)	44.6 (112.3)
Mean daily maximum °C (°F)	10.0 (50.0)	13.6 (56.5)	18.0 (64.4)	23.4 (74.1)	29.2 (84.6)	35.2 (95.4)	37.6 (99.7)	36.2 (97.2)	32.4 (90.3)	25.8 (78.4)	17.1 (62.8)	11.7 (53.1)	24.2 (75.5)
Daily mean °C (°F)	3.4 (38.1)	6.8 (44.2)	11.4 (52.5)	16.8 (62.2)	22.3 (72.1)	27.9 (82.2)	30.3 (86.5)	28.5 (83.3)	24.4 (75.9)	17.9 (64.2)	9.9 (49.8)	4.9 (40.8)	17.0 (62.7)
Mean daily minimum °C (°F)	−2.8 (27.0)	−0.1 (31.8)	4.6 (40.3)	9.7 (49.5)	14.5 (58.1)	19.2 (66.6)	21.7 (71.1)	19.5 (67.1)	15.3 (59.5)	9.6 (49.3)	3.1 (37.6)	−1.1 (30.0)	9.4 (49.0)
Record low °C (°F)	−19.4 (−2.9)	−12.2 (10.0)	−8.3 (17.1)	−4.0 (24.8)	4.5 (40.1)	10.0 (50.0)	13.0 (55.4)	11.0 (51.8)	5.0 (41.0)	0.0 (32.0)	−8.0 (17.6)	−13.0 (8.6)	−19.4 (−2.9)
Average precipitation mm (inches)	20.2 (0.80)	15.9 (0.63)	27.1 (1.07)	20.8 (0.82)	9.4 (0.37)	1.7 (0.07)	0.7 (0.03)	0.3 (0.01)	0.1 (0.00)	3.2 (0.13)	18.2 (0.72)	18.2 (0.72)	135.8 (5.37)
Average snowfall cm (inches)	7.7 (3.0)	0.3 (0.1)	0.1 (0.0)	0.0 (0.0)	0.0 (0.0)	0.0 (0.0)	0.0 (0.0)	0.0 (0.0)	0.0 (0.0)	0.0 (0.0)	0.1 (0.0)	2.4 (0.9)	10.6 (4)
Average precipitation days (≥ 1.0 mm)	3.6	2.7	3.8	3.6	1.6	0.3	0.1	0.1	0.0	0.7	2.6	3.2	22.3
Average snowy days	2.1	0.1	0.4	0.1	0.0	0.0	0.0	0.0	0.0	0.0	0.0	0.7	3.4
Average relative humidity (%)	56	43	37	35	29	19	19	20	22	33	48	59	35
Average dew point °C (°F)	−5.8 (21.6)	−6.3 (20.7)	−4.9 (23.2)	−0.6 (30.9)	1.3 (34.3)	0.8 (33.4)	3.1 (37.6)	2.5 (36.5)	0.1 (32.2)	−0.3 (31.5)	−1.8 (28.8)	−3.5 (25.7)	−1.3 (29.7)
Mean monthly sunshine hours	210	228	255	262	317	358	356	358	322	286	217	199	3,368
Source 1: NOAA NCEI, (snowfall 1981-2010)
Source 2: Iran Meteorological Organization (records)

== Energy ==
The nuclear facilities located in and near Isfahan include the Isfahan Nuclear Technology Center (INTC), the Isfahan Uranium Conversion Facility (UCF), the Isfahan Fuel Manufacturing Plant (FMP), the Isfahan Fuel Element Cladding Plant, the Isfahan Nuclear Fuel Research and Production Center (NFRPC), and the Isfahan Nuclear Waste Storage Facility. In July 2022, Iran announced plans to build a new nuclear research reactor at the Isfahan site.

=== Suspected nuclear weapon development ===
Isfahan is suspected of being the primary location for Iran's secret nuclear weapon development program. In September 2008, IAEA experts stated that they only had limited access in Isfahan, and that a quantity of uranium sufficient for six nuclear weapons were removed from Isfahan to undisclosed locations while still at a stage in the enrichment process which was not monitored. In June 2022, the IAEA reported that 90% of Iran's most highly enriched uranium was moved to the facilities in Isfahan, which house the equipment used to convert uranium gas into uranium metal.

In June 2025, the United States Air Force conducted strikes on sites that, according to the United States and Israel, were used to develop nuclear weapons.

== Military facilities ==
According to some sources, the Polyacryl Iran Corporation, the Linear Alkyl Benzene Complex, and the Chemical Industries Group in Isfahan serve as installation sites for chemical weapons. Reports from the NCRI asserted that nerve agents produced near Semnan were delivered to a missile plant in Isfahan for integration into ballistic-missile warheads, such as those of the Scud-B.

The Chemical Industries Group (CIG), headquartered in the city, is widely described as the backbone of Iran's weapons industry. According to United States intelligence assessments, CIG also manufactures solid-fuel propellant powders for the country's ballistic missile and rocket artillery programmes. Within this conglomerate, a modern chemical complex erected by Sweden's Bofors company in the late 1970s as a dual-use fertiliser-and-explosives facility did not begin operations until 1987, due to Iraqi artillery and missile strikes during the Iran–Iraq War.

The Islamic Revolutionary Guard Corps Aerospace Force (IRGC AF) has an airbase in the city. The Islamic Republic of Iran Air Force (IRIAF) has an airbase, the 8th Predator Tactical Fighter Base (TFB.8), which is the home base for Iranian F-14s. The local Sepah Pasdaran is named "Master of the Era" ("Sepah saheb al zaman" in Arabic and Farsi), after the Mahdi. The Amir Al-Momenin University of Military Sciences and Technology is based in the city.

== Transportation ==
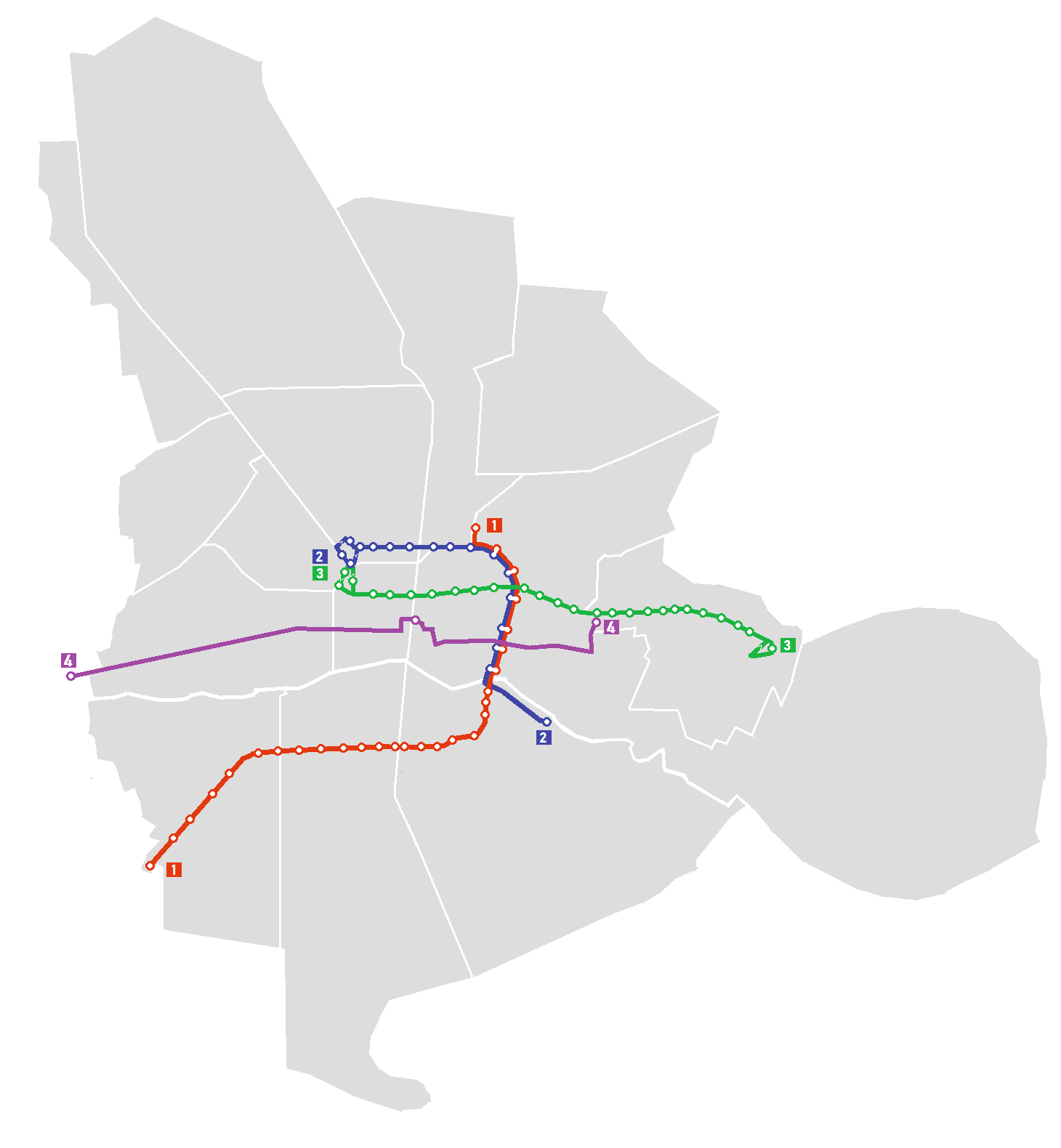
A map of Isfahan's operational BRT lines

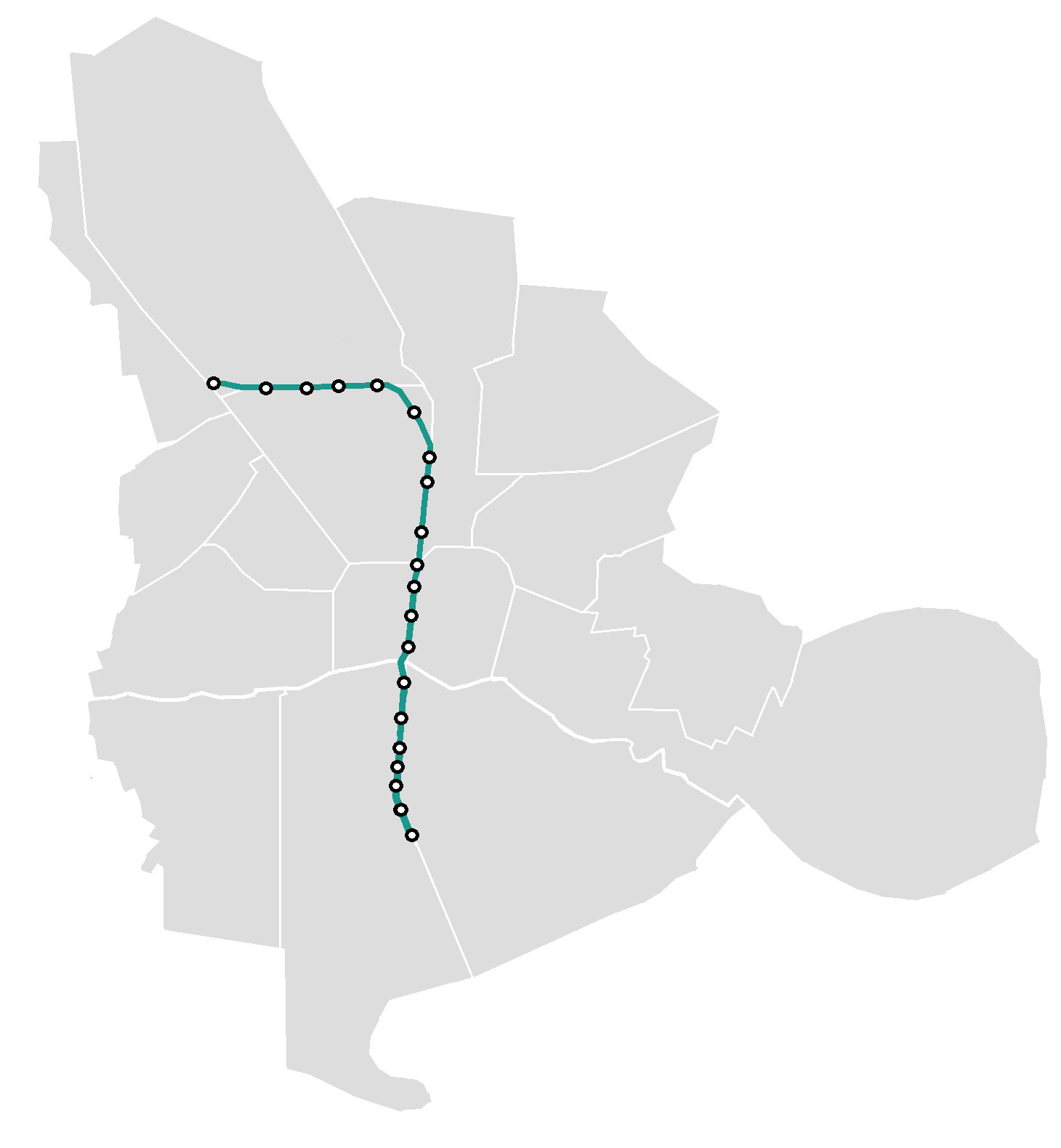
A map of Isfahan's operational metro lines

=== Roads and freeways ===
From 2002 to 2013, Isfahan's internal highway network underwent an expansion. Freeways connect the city to Iran's other major cities, including Tehran, 400 kilometres (250 mi) to the north, and Shiraz, 200 kilometres (120 mi) to the south. Highways also service satellite cities surrounding the metropolitan area.

The Isfahan Eastern Bypass Freeway is under construction.

In 2021, a new AVL system was deployed in the city.

=== Bridges ===
The oldest bridge over the Zayanderud is the Shahrestan Bridge, whose foundations were built during the Sasanian Empire (3rd–7th century Sassanid era); it was repaired during the Seljuk period. Further upstream is the Khaju Bridge, which Shah Abbas II built in 1650. It is 123 metres (404 feet) long, with 24 arches; it also serves as a sluice gate. Another bridge is the Choobi (Joui) Bridge.

Further upstream again is the Allahverdi Khan Bridge, also known as Si-o-se-pol (سی‌وسه‌پل, 'bridge of thirty-three [spans]'). It was built during the reign of Shah Abbas the Great by Sheikh Baha'i and connected Isfahan with the Armenian suburb of New Julfa. It is by far the longest bridge in Isfahan at 295 m (967.85 ft). Another notable bridge is the Marnan Bridge.

=== Ride sharing ===
Snapp! and Tapsi (ridehailing) are two of the carpooling apps in the city. The city has built 42 bicycle-sharing stations and 150 kilometres (93 mi) of paved bicycle paths.

As part of Iran's Islamic religious laws, women are forbidden to use the public bicycle-sharing network, as decreed by the representative of the Supreme Leader in Isfahan, Ayatollah Yousef Tabatabai Nejad, and General Attorney Ali Esfahani.

=== Mass transit ===
The Isfahan and Suburbs Bus Company operates transit buses in the city. East–West BRT Bus Rapid Transit Line buses carry up to 120,000 passengers daily.

The municipality signed a memorandum with Khatam al-Anbiya to construct a tram network in the city. The Isfahan Metro was opened on 15 October 2015. It consists of one north–south line with a length of 20.2 kilometres (12.6 mi), and two more lines are under construction, alongside three suburban rail lines.

The city is served by a railway station, with the Islamic Republic of Iran Railways running trains to Bandarabbas and Mashhad. The first high-speed railway in Iran, the Tehran-Qom-Isfahan line, is being constructed to connect Isfahan to Tehran and Qom.

=== Airports ===
Isfahan is served by Isfahan Shahid Beheshti International Airport, which in 2019 was the 7th busiest airport in Iran, and is adjacent to Khatami Air Base.

== Economy ==
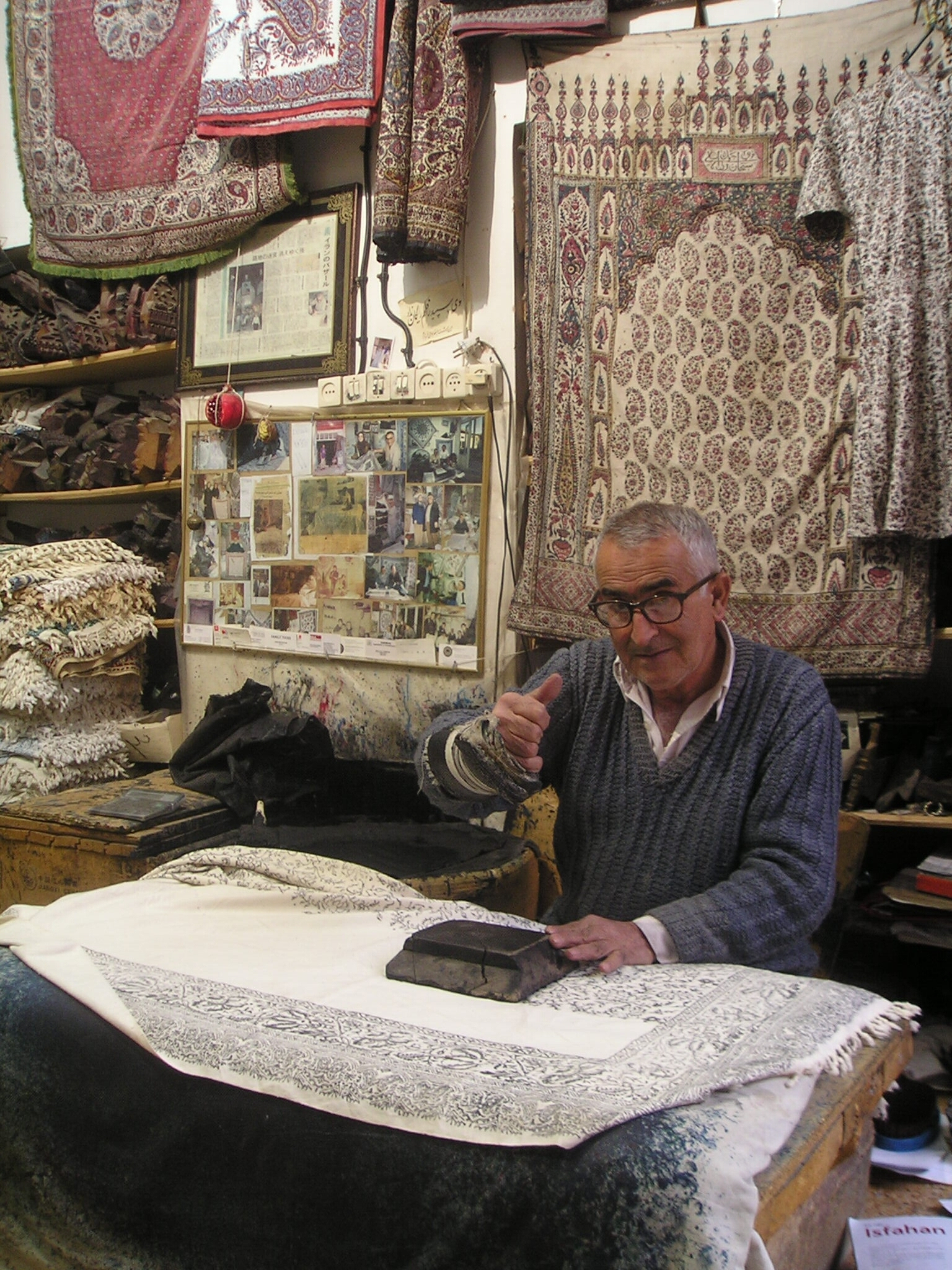
An old master of hand-printed carpets in Isfahan bazaar

In 2014, industry, mines, and commerce in Isfahan province accounted for 35% to 50% (almost $229 billion) of the Iranian Gross Domestic Product. In 2019, Isfahan province's governorate said that tourism was the number one priority.

According to Isfahan province's administrator for Department of Cooperatives, Labour, and Social Welfare, Iran had the cheapest labor workforce anywhere in the world. The labor force grew from 1990 to 2020; however, in 2018 the unemployment rate was 15%.

The Esfahan Province Electricity Distribution Company, established in 1992, maintains a privatized power grid in the city.

As of September 2020, the handicrafts industry of Isfahan Province was contributing $500 million annually to the economy. Isfahan Fair, a 22-hectare (54-acre) exhibition center aimed at increasing tourism, was opened on 4 November 2020. The municipality has implemented internet payment software.

In 2025 Zimbabwe signed MaU around trade with the city.

=== Aquaculture and agriculture ===
Isfahan city produces 1,300 tons of salmon. More than 28% of the country's ornamental fish is supplied from Isfahan province, from 780 farms, which in 2017 farmed 65.5 million fish.

Opium, also known as Afyūn locally, was produced and exported from Isfahan from 1850 until it became illegal, and was an important source of income. Isfahan has a large number of aqueducts, farmers having to divert water from the river to farms by canal. Niasarm is one of the largest canals.

From 2012 to 2013 there were large protests by farmers against the Isfahan-Yazd water tunnel. In 2019, eastern city farmers demanded water, or else they would sabotage water pipes. Farmers at the Fruits and Vegetables Central Market sell 10,000 tons a day.

=== Textiles ===
The industrialization of Isfahan dates from the Pahlavi period, as in all of Iran, and was marked by the growth of the textile industry; this earned the city the nickname "Manchester of Persia". By the mid-1960s, there were 25 mills employing between 18,000 and 20,000 workers, and Isfahan produced almost half of Iran's textiles. In the late 1970s the Polyacryl Iran Corporation was established in Isfahan, in partnership with the American company DuPont; in the late 1990s it produced nearly 80 percent of Iran's man-made fiber. Isfahan is also home to a significant cottage industry with many small textile shops.

=== High tech and heavy industries ===
The Isfahan Scientific and Research Town was founded in 2001, to act as a mediator between government, industry, and academia in order to establish a knowledge-based economy. Isfahan is the third-largest medicine manufacturing hub in Iran.

The Telecommunication Company of Iran and Mobile Communications of Iran provide 4G, 3G, broadband, and VDSL.

Isfahan has one of the largest steel-producing facilities in the region, as well as facilities for producing special alloys. The Mobarakeh Steel Company is the largest steel producer in the Middle East and Northern Africa, and it is the biggest direct reduced iron producer in the world. The Esfahan Steel Company was the first manufacturer of constructional steel products in Iran, and it remains the largest such company today.

== Recreation and tourism ==
Tourism logo by the Isfahan Province Chamber of Commerce

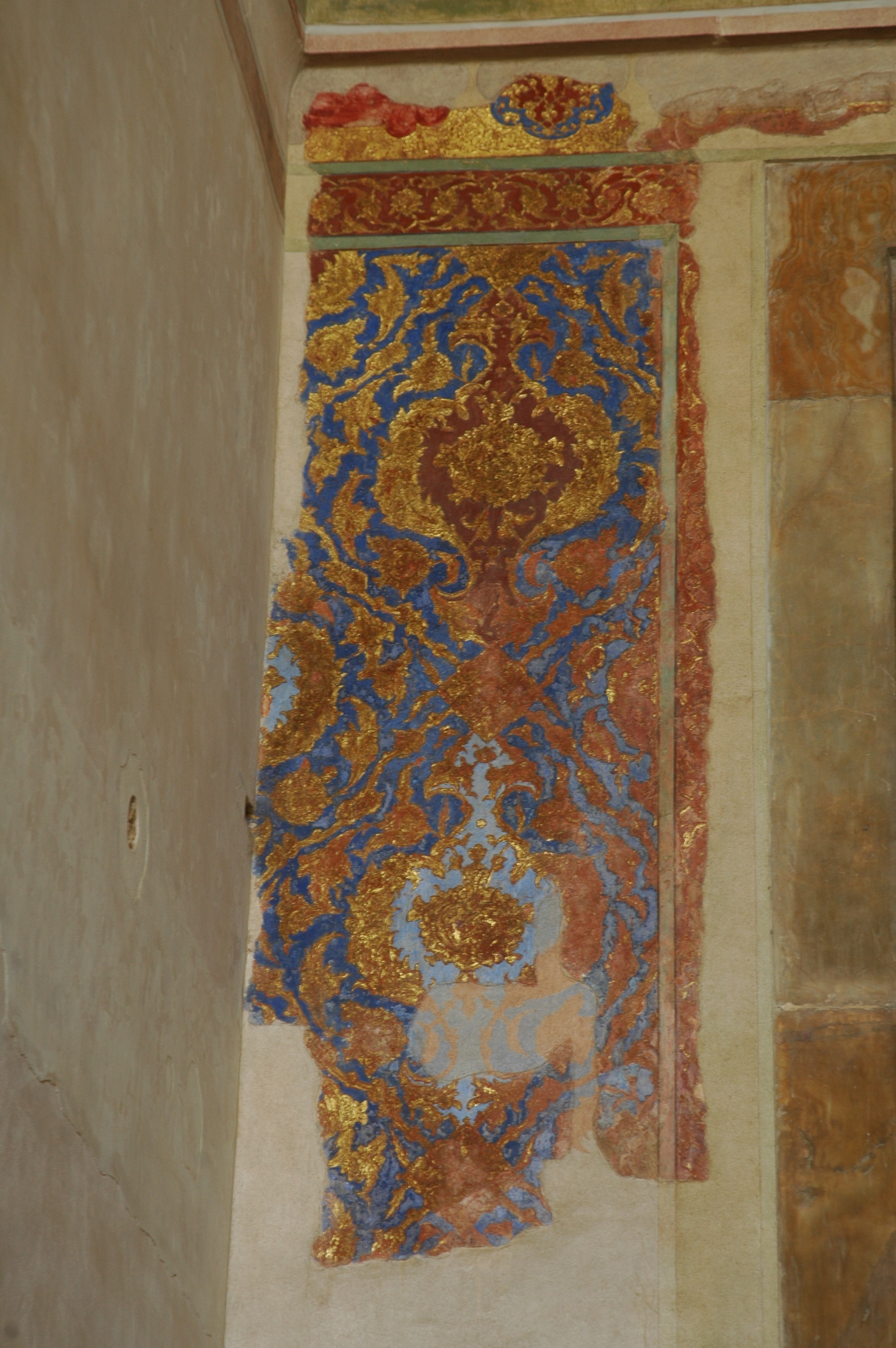
Detail of Ali Qapu Palace in Isfahan

In 2018–2019, 450,000 foreign nationals visited the city. Some 110 trillion rials (around US$440 million in 2020) were invested in the province's tourism sector.

Nazhvan Park hosts a reptile zoo with 40 aquariums. There are two water parks: the Saadi water park and the Nazhvan water park. There are party gardens and wedding halls.

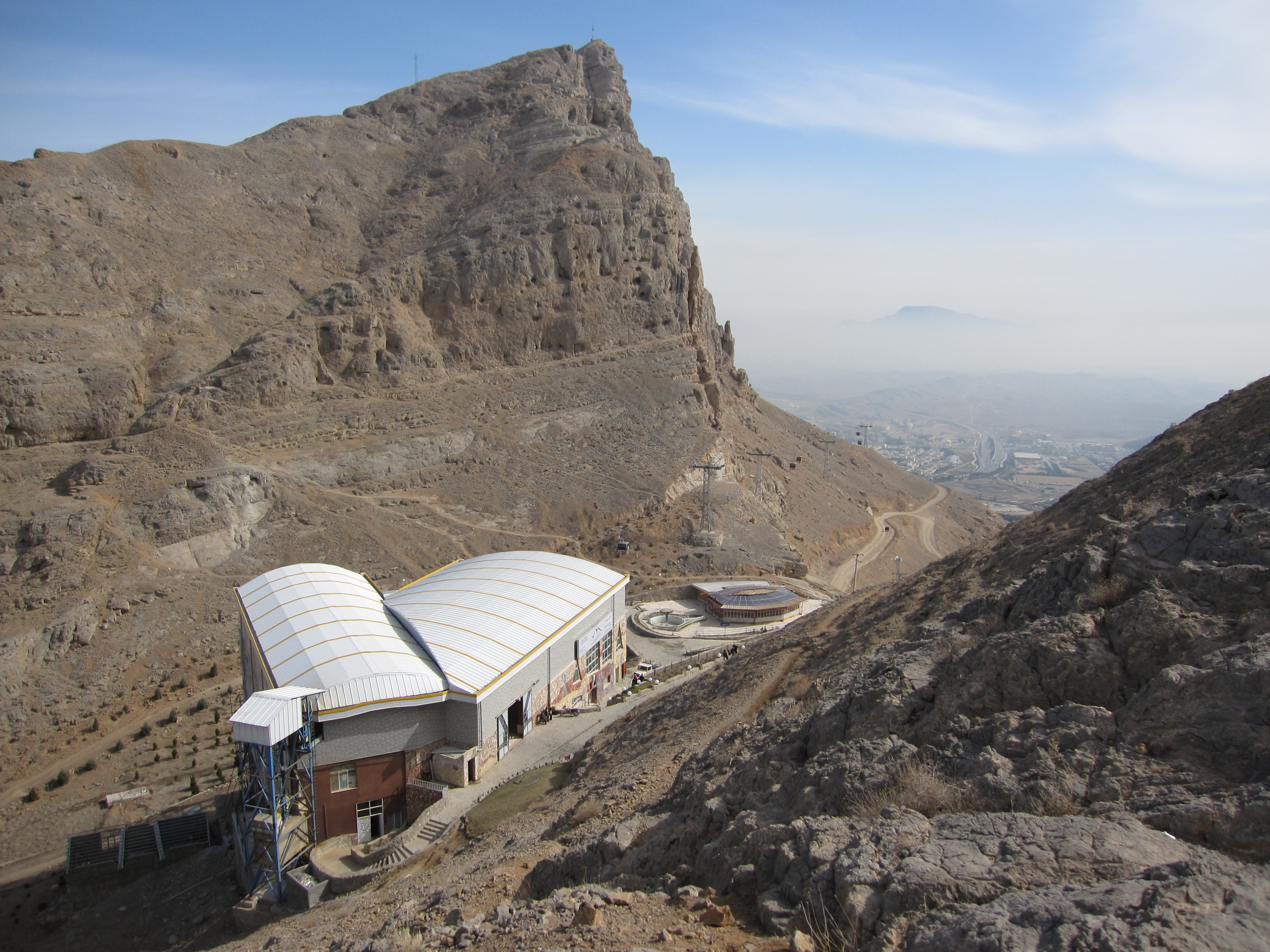
View of Isfahan from Telecabin station on Mount Soffeh

=== Medical tourism ===
The Isfahan Healthcare city complex, built on a 300 hectares (740 acres) site near the Aqa Babaei Expressway, is intended to boost the city's medical tourism revenues.

=== Shopping ===
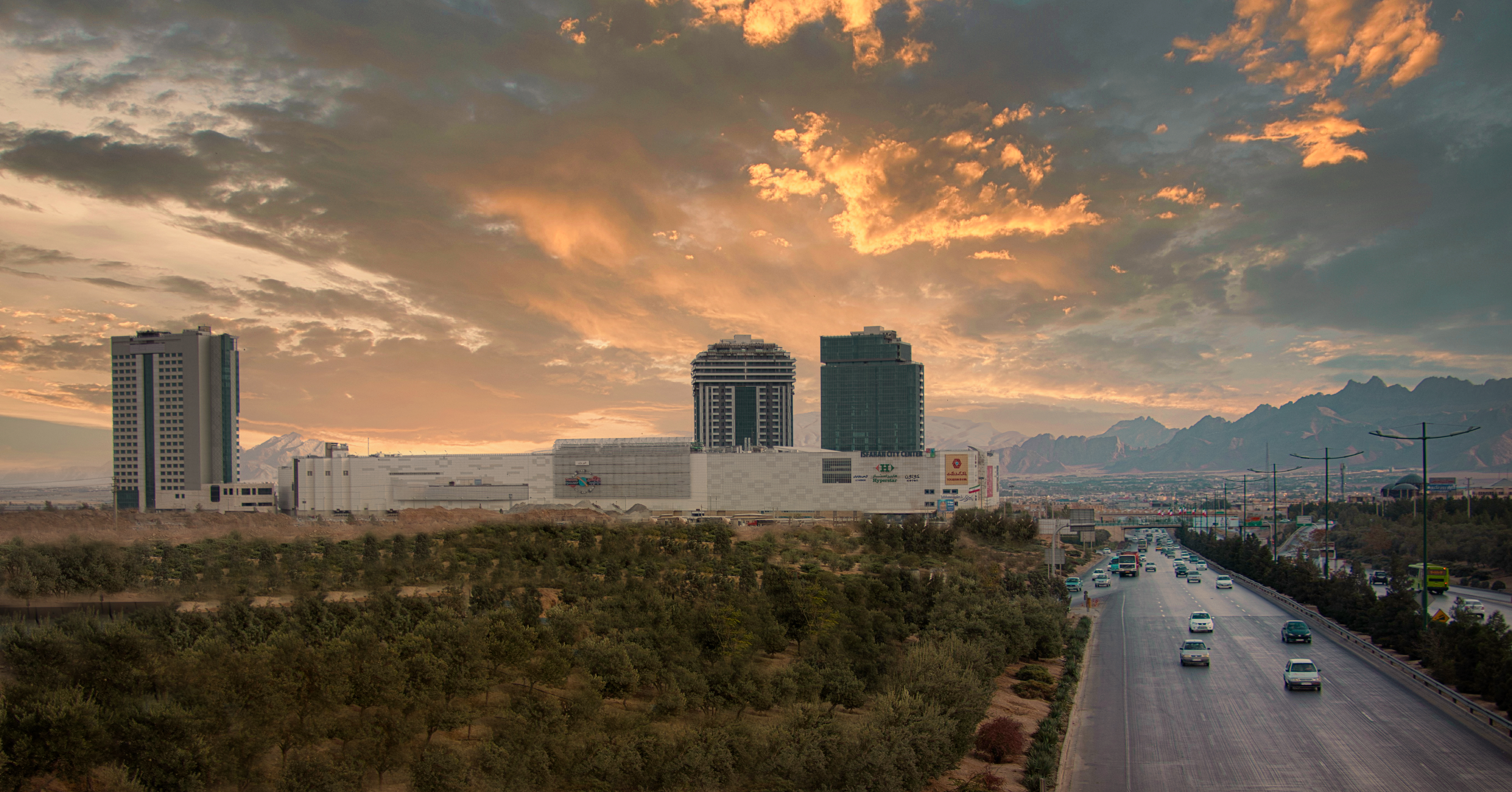
Isfahan City Center

The city is served by Refah Chain Stores Co., Iran Hyper Star, Isfahan City Center, Shahrvand Chain Stores Inc., and Kowsar Market.

=== Cinemas ===
There are nine cinemas. Historically, cinemas old Isfahan were entertainment for the working class.

Religious people considered the cinema to be a mostly impure place and going to the cinema to was haram under Islam. During the 1979 revolution, many cinemas in Isfahan were burned down. Cinema Iran, now a ruin, was one of the oldest cinemas in the city. Great foreign filmmakers such as Agnès Varda and Pier Paolo Pasolini shot scenes in Isfahan.

=== Sports ===
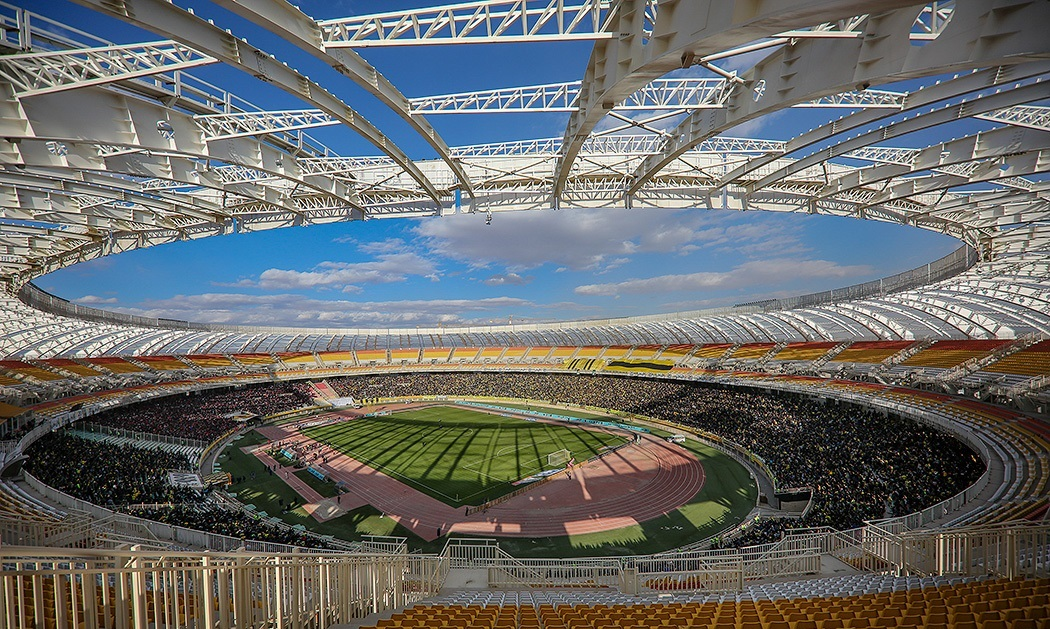
Naghsh-e Jahan Stadium

Isfahan has three association football clubs: Sepahan S.C., Zob Ahan Isfahan F.C., and Sanaye Giti Pasand F.C.. There was another club, Polyacryl Esfahan F.C., which is now defunct.

Sepahan has won the most league football titles among Iranian clubs. The Foolad Mobarakeh Sepahan handball team plays in the Islamic Republic of Iran Handball Federation. Sepahan has a youth women's running team that became national champions in 2020.

Giti Pasand has a futsal team, Giti Pasand FSC. They won the AFC Futsal Club Championship in 2012 and were runners-up in 2013. Giti Pasand also fields a women's volleyball team, Giti Pasand Isfahan VC, that plays matches in the Iranian Women's Volleyball League. Basketball clubs include Zob Ahan Isfahan BC and Foolad Mahan Isfahan BC. There are Pahlevani zoorkhanehs in the city.

== Demographics ==
Historical population
Year	Pop.	±% p.a.
1870	60,000	—
1890	90,000	+2.05%
1900	100,000	+1.06%
1920	80,000	−1.11%
1933	100,100	+1.74%
1942	204,600	+8.27%
1956	254,700	+1.58%
1966	444,000	+5.71%
1976	671,800	+4.23%
1986	986,800	+3.92%
1991	1,182,735	+3.69%
1996	1,327,283	+2.33%
2001	1,502,567	+2.51%
2006	1,689,392	+2.37%
2011	1,853,293	+1.87%
2016	1,961,260	+1.14%

In 2019, the mean age for first marriages was 25 years for females and 30 years for males.

There are almost 500,000 people living in slums, including in the northern part, and especially in the eastern sector, of the city.

Esfahani is one of the main dialects of Western Persian. Jewish districts speak a unique dialect.

During the Pahlavi era, a large group of the Kurdish Gulbaghi tribe were moved from the north of Kurdistan province to the city of Isfahan and the cities of Kashan and Naein. Today, the Gulbaghi tribe are mostly assimilated elements in the population of these cities.

While immigrants may reside and work in Isfahan, they are denied entry to 12 surrounding communities.

=== Neighborhoods ===
Among the neighborhoods of Isfahan are the following:

- Aminabad
- Andevan
- Atasharan
- Chengan
- Denarat
- Fenart
- Fizadan
- Gavart
- Hasseh
- Histan
- Jelvan
- Jey Shir
- Jowharan
- Kalamkharan
- Khatunabad
- Kian
- Kuy-e Golestan
- Kuy-e Rowshan Shahr
- Khvorasgan
- Laftun
- Mahmudabad
- Mohammadabad
- Qaleh-ye Bertianchi
- Raddan
- Raran
- Rowshan Dasht
- Salimi
- Sanjavan Marreh
- Shahrak-e Bakhtiar Dasht
- Shahrak-e Shahid Montazeri
- Shahrak-e Vali-ye Asr
- Shahrak-e Zayandeh Rud
- Zavan

== Religion ==
=== Mosques ===
- Agha Nour mosque (16th century)
- Hakim Mosque
- Ilchi mosque
- Jameh Mosque
- Jarchi mosque (1610)
- Lonban mosque
- Maghsoudbeyk mosque (1601)
- Mohammad Jafar Abadei mosque (1878)
- Rahim Khan mosque (19th century)
- Roknolmolk mosque
- Seyyed mosque (19th century)
- Shah Mosque (1629) – damaged in 2022
- Sheikh Lotf Allah Mosque (1618)
- Agha Mirza Muhammad Baqir Chahar Suqi Mosque

=== Imamzadehs (shrine tombs) ===
- Imamzadeh Ahmad
- Imamzadeh Esmaeil and Isaiah mausoleum
- Imamzadeh Haroun-e-Velayat
- Imamzadeh Ja'far
- Imamzadeh Shah Zeyd

=== Churches and cathedrals ===
Churches are mostly located in the New Julfa region. The oldest church in the city is the St. Jakob Church (1607). Other historically important churches include the St. Georg Church (17th century), St. Mary Church (1613), Bedkhem Church (1627), and Vank Cathedral (1664). Pacifique de Provins established a French mission in the city in 1627.

=== Synagogues ===
Benjamin of Tudela reported that Isfahan had 15,000 Jews in 1170.

- Kenisa-ye Bozorg (Mirakhor's kenisa)
- Kenisa-ye Molla Rabbi
- Kenisa-ye Sang-bast
- Mullah Jacob Synagogue
- Mullah Neissan Synagogue
- Kenisa-ye Keter David

== Civic administration ==
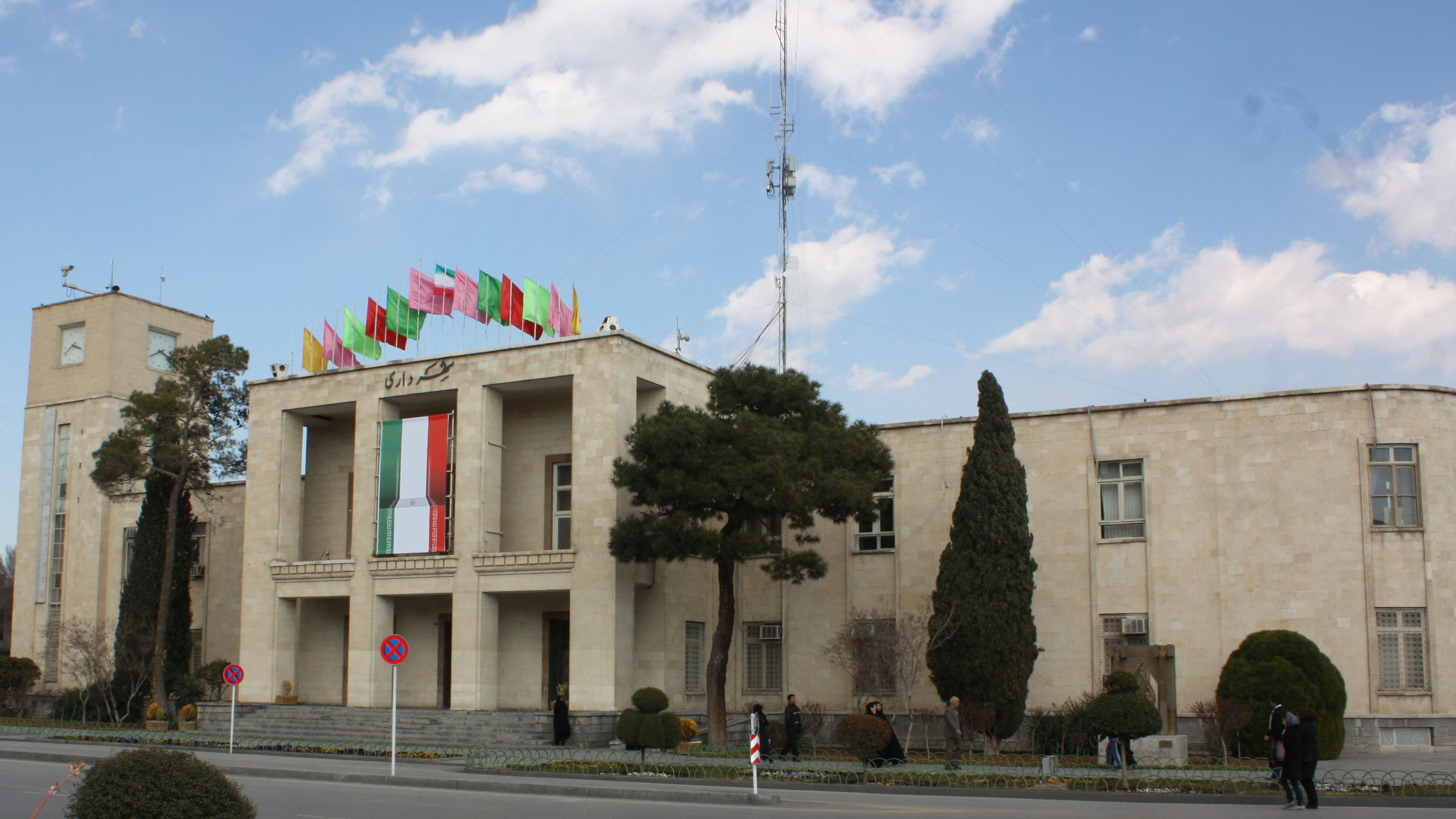
Old Isfahan city hall

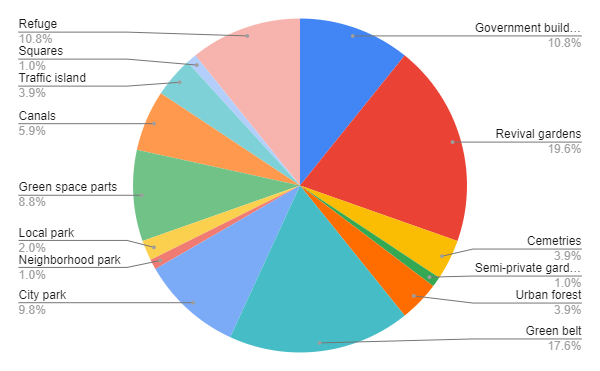
Isfahan city greenspace share atlas data 2020

Isfahan has a smart city program, a unified human resources administration system, and a transport system. It also has waste management.

In 2015, the comprehensive atlas of the Isfahan metropolis, an online statistical database in Farsi, was made available, to help in planning.

In 2020, the municipality directly employed 6,250 people with an additional 3,000 people in 16 subsidiary organizations.

There have been four development programs since 1967. In 2020, the municipality created a document outlining future development programs for the city.

The color theme for the city has been turquoise for some time.

=== Municipal government ===
The mayor is Ghodratollah Noroozi. The chairman of the city council is Alireza Nasrisfahani. There is also a leadership council within the city council. The representative of the Supreme Leader of Iran, as well as the representative from Isfahan in the Assembly of Experts, is Yousef Tabatabai Nejad.

The city is divided into 15 municipal districts.

Municipal districts of Isfahan

Name	Persian Name	Legal Urban Area	Total Area of jurisdictional limit	Population	Population Density	Location within Isfahan
District 1	منطقه ۱ – Mantaqe ye Yek	8.10 km^{2}	8.10 km^{2}	79,091	9,764.3/km^{2}	
District 2	منطقه ۲ – Mantaqe ye Do	10.31 km^{2}	21.45 km^{2}	69,120	3,222.4/km^{2}	
District 3	منطقه ۳ – Mantaqe ye Se	11.52 km^{2}	11.52 km^{2}	110,368	9,580.5/km^{2}	
District 4	منطقه ۴ – Mantaqe ye Ĉahār	11.35 km^{2}	75.02 km^{2}	133,731	1,782.6/km^{2}	
District 5	منطقه ۵ – Mantaqe ye Panj	17.02 km^{2}	60.02 km^{2}	150,865	2,513.6/km^{2}	
District 6	منطقه ۶ – Mantaqe ye Ŝeŝ	12.55 km^{2}	67.07 km^{2}	112,129	1,671.2/km^{2}	
District 7	منطقه ۷ – Mantaqe ye Haft	13.57 km^{2}	28.57 km^{2}	168,732	5,905.6/km^{2}	
District 8	منطقه ۸ – Mantaqe ye Haŝt	20.39 km^{2}	20.39 km^{2}	239,756	11,758.5/km^{2}	
District 9	منطقه ۹ – Mantaqe ye Noh	10.54 km^{2}	20.25 km^{2}	75,168	3,712.0/km^{2}	
District 10	منطقه ۱۰ – Mantaqe ye Dah	16.27 km^{2}	21.46 km^{2}	207,803	9,683.3/km^{2}	
Rehnan (District 11)	منطقه ۱۱ – Mantaqe ye Yāzdah رهنان – Rehnān	7.80 km^{2}	10.97 km^{2}	58,841	5,363.8/km^{2}	
District 12	منطقه ۱۲ – Mantaqe ye Davāzdah	14.78 km^{2}	82.23 km^{2}	136,376	1,658.5/km^{2}	
District 13	منطقه ۱۳ – Mantaqe ye Sizdah	20.10 km^{2}	35.24 km^{2}	132,469	3,759.1/km^{2}	
District 14	منطقه ۱۴ – Mantaqe ye Ĉahārdah	9.40 km^{2}	19.38 km^{2}	164,850	8,506.2/km^{2}	
Khorasgan (District 15)	منطقه ۱۵ – Mantaqe ye Pānzdah خوراسگان – Xorāsgān	16.64 km^{2}	69.05 km^{2}	121,961	1,766.3/km^{2}	
Total		200.34 km^{2}	550.72 km^{2}	1,961,260	3,581.4/km^{2}	

=== Public works ===
City waste is processed and recycled at the Isfahan Waste Complex.

The Isfahan Water and Sewage Company is responsible for piping water, waterworks installation and repair, maintaining sewage equipment, supervising sewage collection, and treatment and disposal of sewage in the city.

Twenty-five fire departments provide service. Twenty private security armed service contractors existed as of 2012.

=== Human resources and public health ===
As of June 2020, 65% of the population of Isfahan province had social security insurance.

Isfahan is known as the multiple sclerosis capital of the world, due to the presence of polluting industries.

In 2015, almost 15% of the people suffered from depression, from being cut off from the Zayandeh River, due to severe drought. A male empowerment/rehab center opened in 2023, followed by a female support addiction center.

== Mass surveillance ==
In 2024–25, the Iranian government used the city as a testing ground for enforcing its mandatory hijab law. It employed cameras for surveillance and deployed government agents to report women who do not adhere to the government-approved hijab dress code.

== Education and science ==
The first elementary schools in the city were maktabkhanehs. In World War II, Polish children sought refuge in the city; eight primary and technical trade schools were established. Between 1942 and 1945, approximately 2,000 children passed through, with Isfahan briefly gaining the nickname "City of Polish Children". In 2019, there were 20 schools for trainables attended by 5,000 children.

=== Notable schools ===
The Central Municipal Library of Isfahan

- Chahar Bagh School (early 17th century)
- Kordi
- Kassegaran school (1694)
- Khajoo Madrasa
- Nimavar School (1691)
- Sadr Madrasa (19th century)

In total, there are more than 7,329 schools in Isfahan province.

=== Colleges ===
In 1947, the Isfahan University of Medical Sciences was established; it now has almost 9,200 students and interns. In 1973, the American School of Isfahan was built; it closed during the 1978–79 revolution. In 1974, the first technical university in Iran, the Isfahan University of Technology, was established in the city. It focuses on science, engineering, and agriculture programs. In 1977, the Isfahan University of Art was established. It was temporarily closed after the 1979 revolution, and was reopened in 1984, after the Iranian Cultural Revolution.

Aside from seminaries and religious schools, the other public, private major universities of the Isfahan metropolitan area include: the Mohajer Technical And Vocational College of Isfahan, Payame Noor University, the Islamic Azad University of Isfahan, the Islamic Azad University of Najafabad, and the Islamic Azad University of Majlesi.

As of 2007, there were also more than 50 technical and vocational training centres in the province, under the administration of the Isfahan Technical and Vocational Training Organization (TVTO), providing free, informal, workforce skills training programs. As of 2020, 90% of workforce skills trainees were women.

=== Notable philosophers ===
Major philosophers include Mir Damad, known for his concepts of time and nature, as well as for founding the School of Isfahan; and Mir Fendereski, who was known for his examination of art and philosophy within society.

== Culture ==
The festivals of Tirgan and Sepandārmazgān are ancient traditions in Isfahan. Historically, men used to wear the kolah namadi.

The Isfahan School of painting flourished during the Safavid era.

The annual Isfahan province theatre festival takes place in the city. Theater performances began in 1919 (1297 AH), and currently, there are 9 active theaters.

The awarding of the annual Isfahan literature prize began in 2004.

Since 2005, November 22 is Isfahan's National Day, commemorated with various events.

New Art Paradise, built in District 6 in 2019, has the biggest open-air amphitheatre in the country.

Based on a statue creators' symposium in 2020, the city decided to add 11 permanent art pieces to the city's monuments.

The Isfahan international convention center is under construction.

=== Cuisine ===
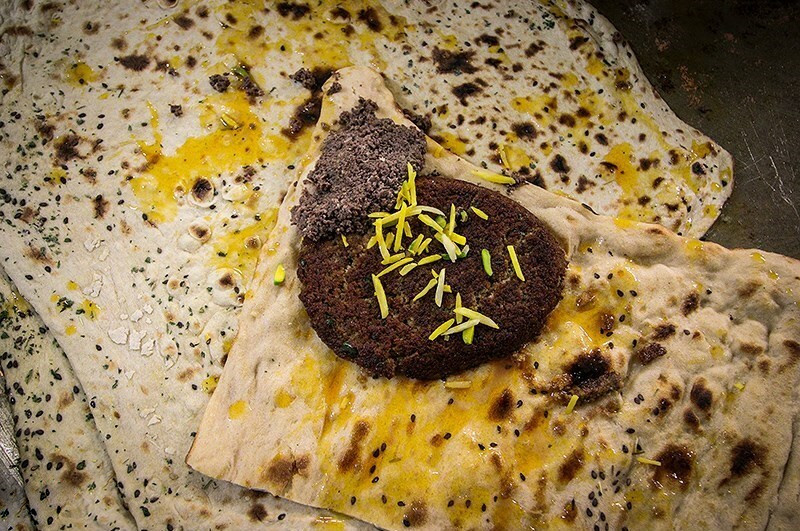
Isfahan beryani, one of the traditional dishes of Isfahan

Gosh-e fil and Doogh are local snacks. Other traditional dishes include Khoresht mast, beryani, meat with beans, and pumpkin aush. The sweets gaz and poolaki originated in Isfahan.

Teahouses are supervised and were allowed to offer hookah until 2022. As of 2020, there were almost 300 teahouses with permits.

=== Music ===
The Bayat-e Esfahan, one of the modes used in Iranian traditional music, derives its name from Isfahan.

On 12 and 13 January 2018, the Iranian singer Salar Aghili performed in the city without the female members of his band, due to interference by local officials at the Ministry of Islamic Culture and Guidance.

=== News media ===
The first newspaper publication in the city, Farhang, was printed for 13 years in the Qajar era. Iran's Metropolises News Agency (IMNA), formerly called the Isfahan Municipality News Agency, is based in the city. The state-controlled Islamic Republic of Iran Broadcasting system (IRIB) has a TV network and radio channel in the city.

== Cultural sites ==
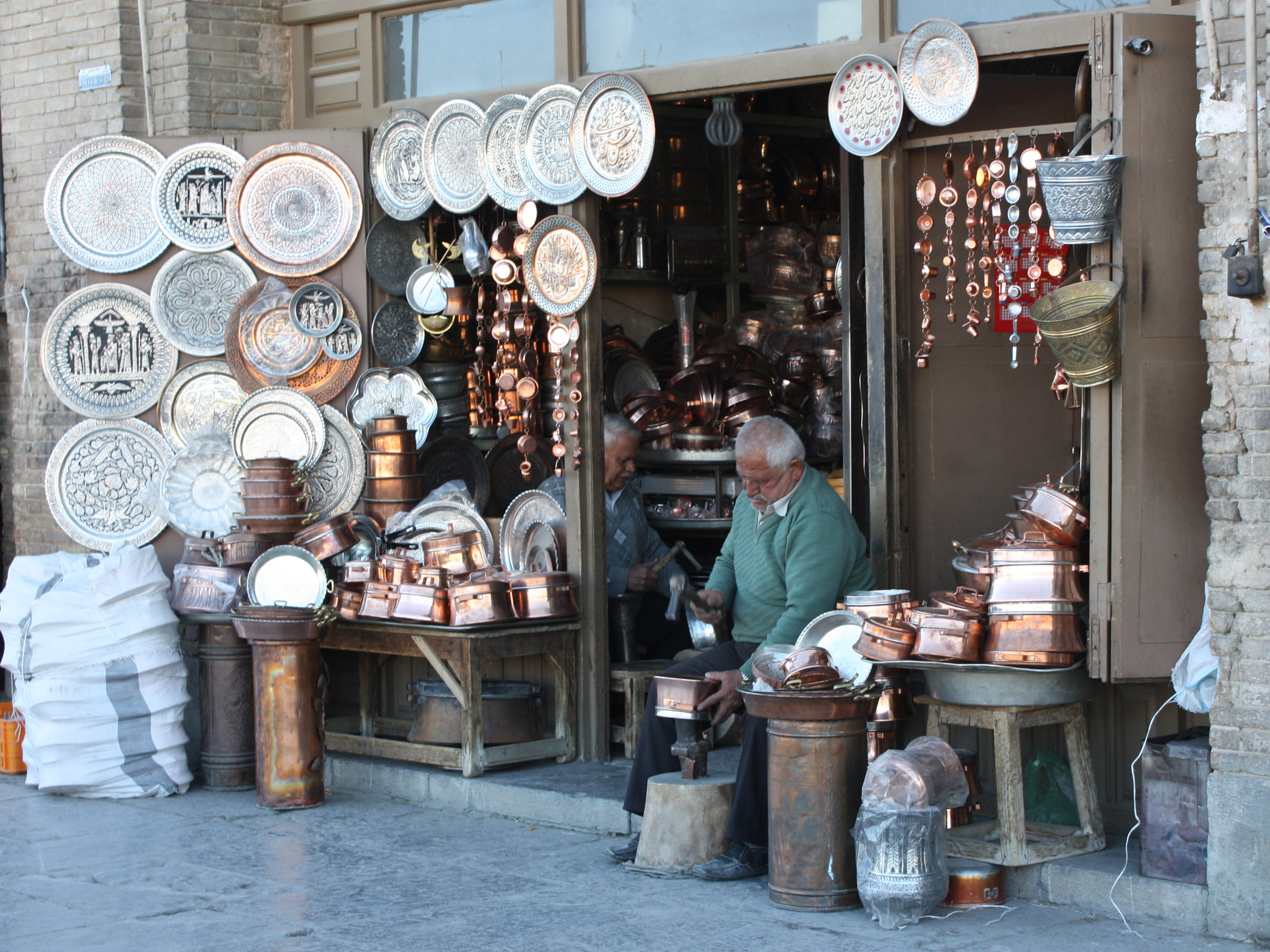
A handicraft shop

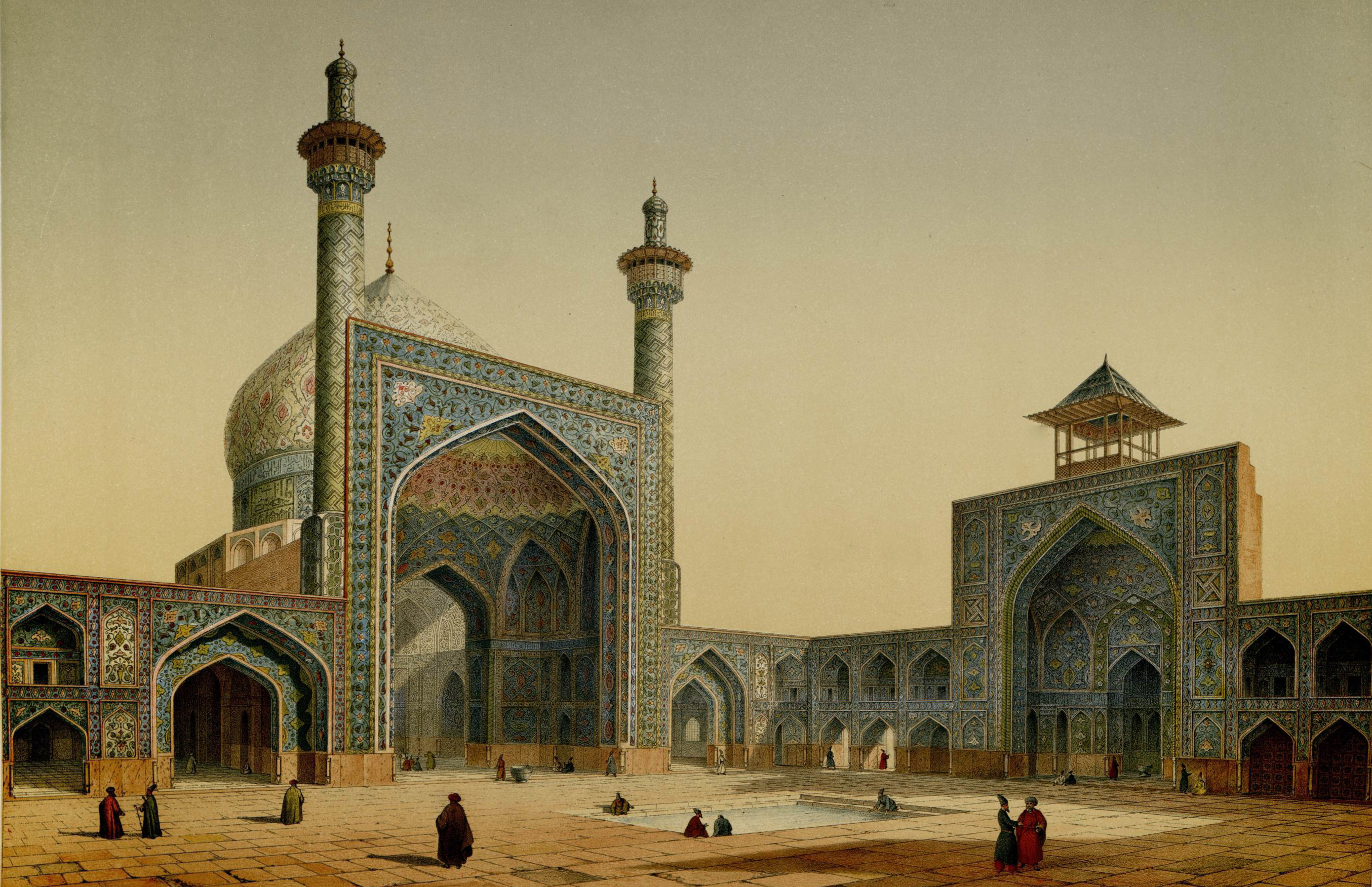
Shah Mosque. Painting by the French architect, Pascal Coste, visiting Persia in 1841.

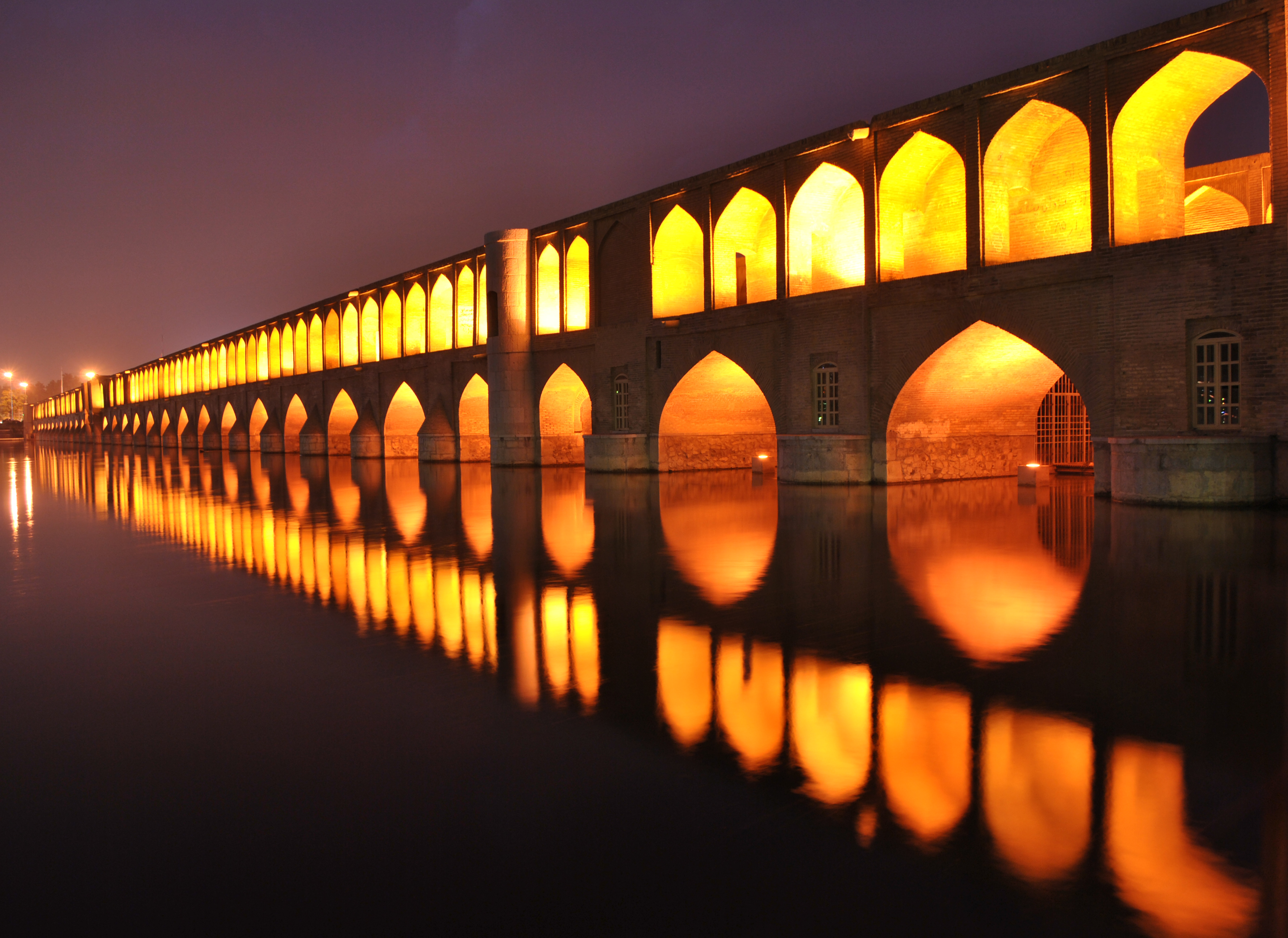
Si-o-se Pol

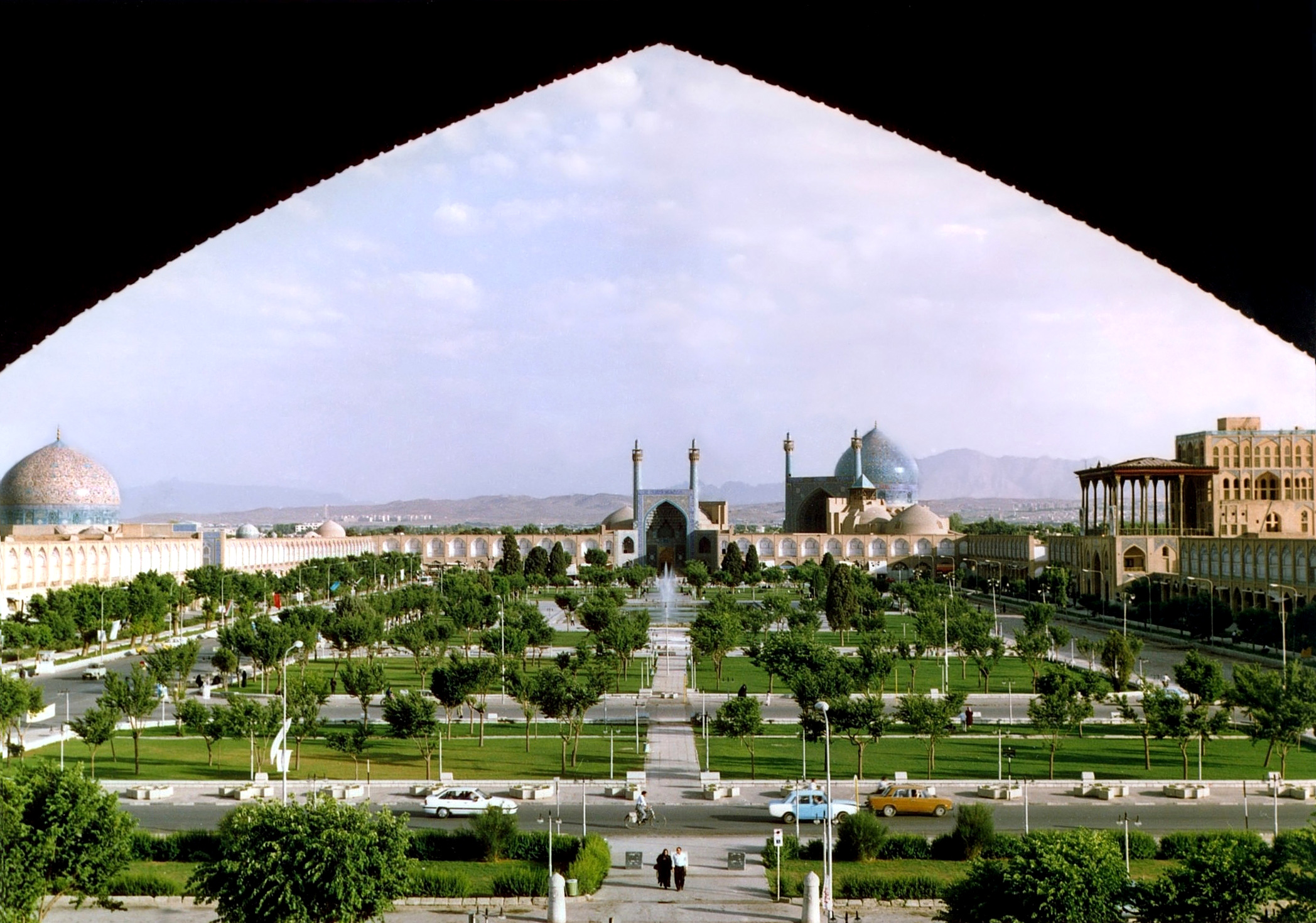
Naghsh-e-Jahan Square

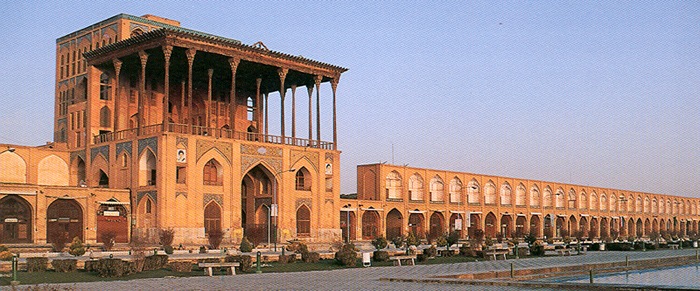
Ali Qapu Palace

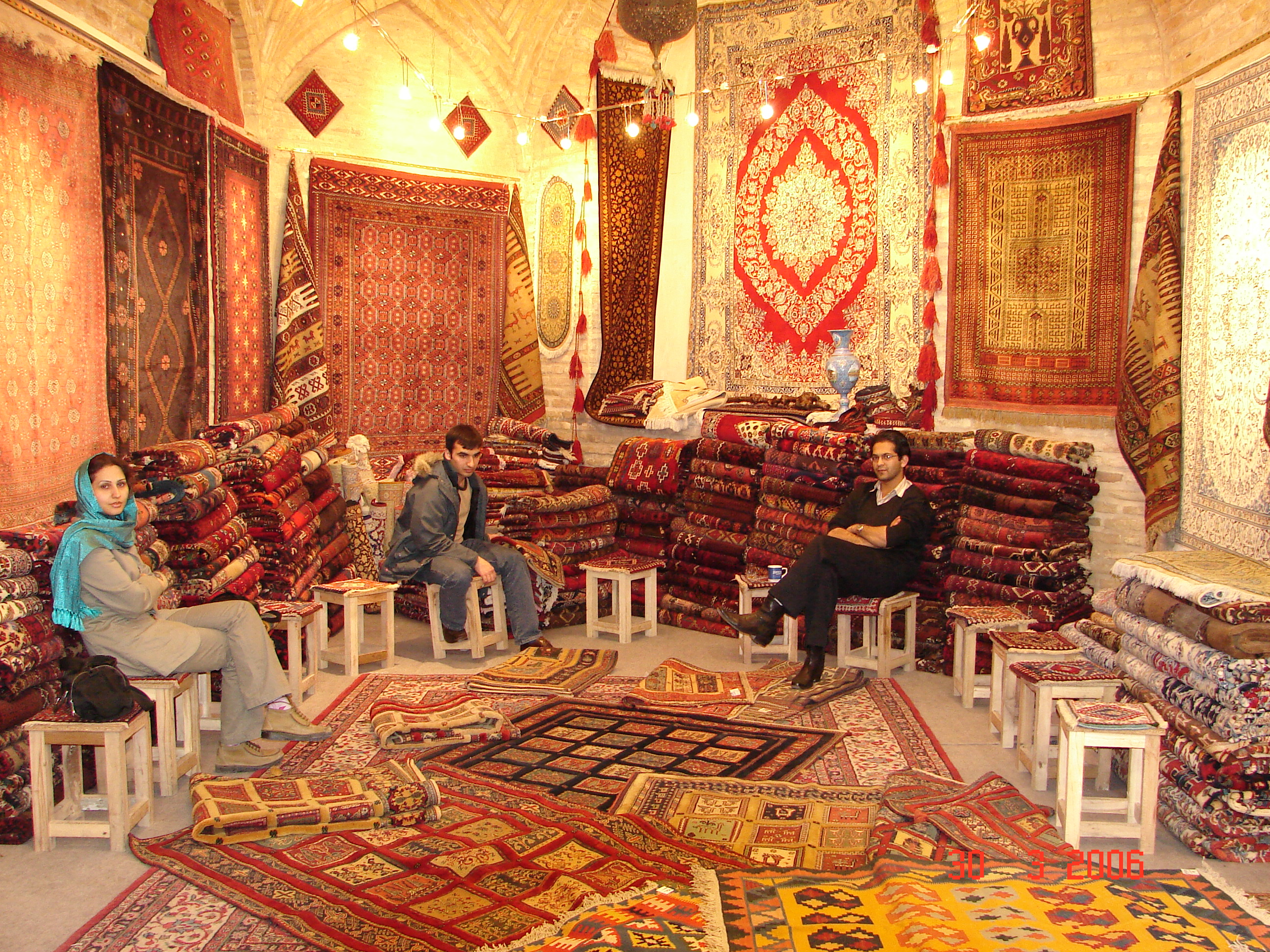
A carpet shop in Grand Bazaar, Isfahan

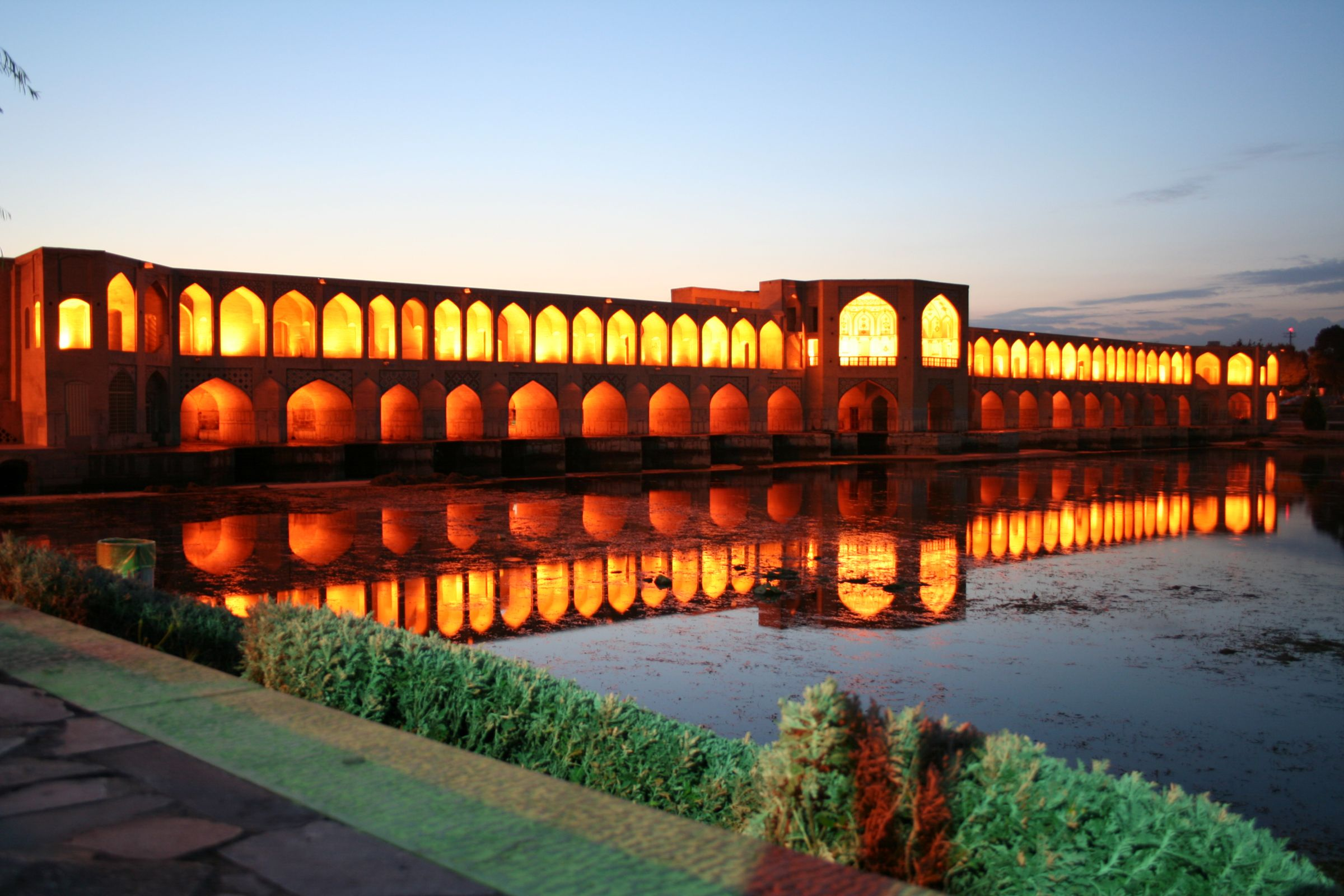
Khaju Bridge

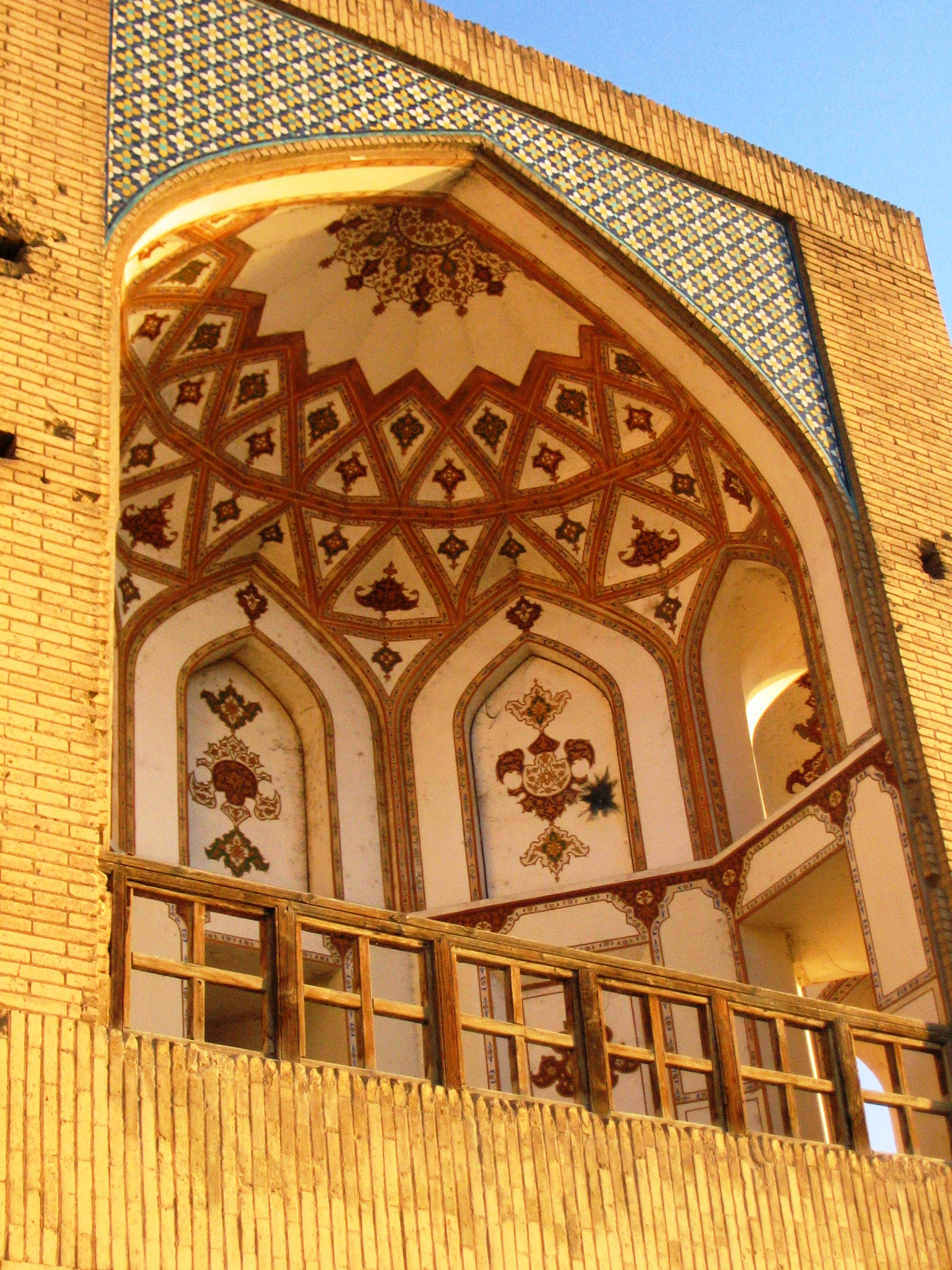
Detail of Khaju Bridge

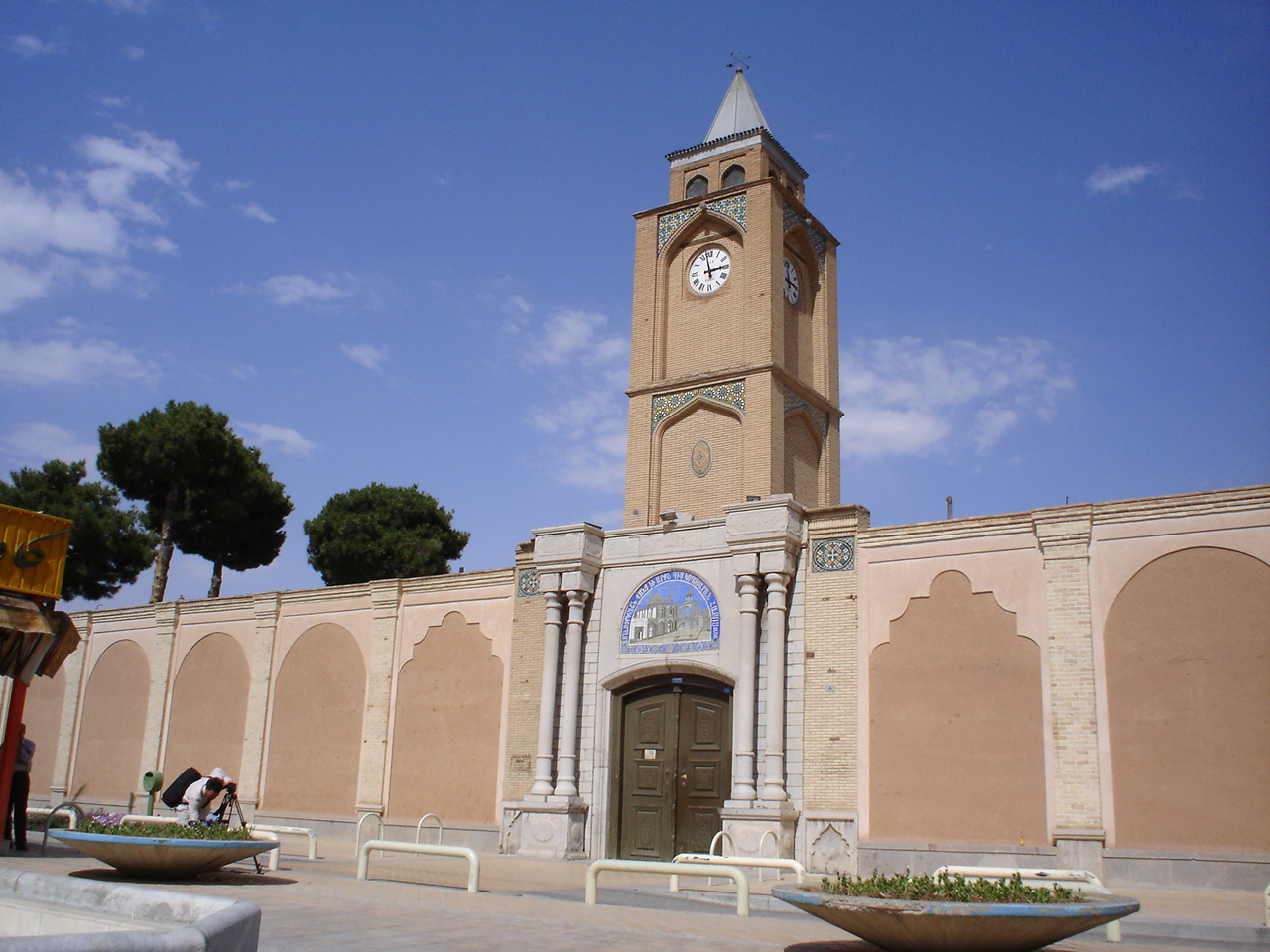
Armenian Vank Cathedral

The city centre consists of an older section centered around the Jameh Mosque and the Safavid expansion around Naqsh-e Jahan Square, with nearby palaces, bazaars, and places of worship This area is called Seeosepol, after the bridge of the same name.

=== Baths ===
Ancient baths include the Jarchi hammam, the Ali Gholi Agha hammam, and the Garmabeh-e-shaykh. The latter was built by Baha' al-din al-'Amili, and for many years was provided hot water to the public without any visible heating system, which would usually need tons of wood. The Khosro Agha hammam was demolished by unknown persons in 1992. Chardin writes that there were 273 baths in Isfahan in the Safavid era.

=== Bazaars ===
The Grand Bazaar, Isfahan, and its entrance, the Qeysarie Gate, were built in the 17th century. Opium dens and coffeehouses, clustered around the Chahar bagh and the Chehel Sotoun, served as social hubs. The best-known traditional coffeehouse is Qahva-ḵāna-ye Golestān.

=== Cemeteries ===
The Bagh-e Rezvan Cemetery is one of the largest and most advanced in the country. Other cemeteries include the New Julfa Armenian Cemetery and the Takht-e Foulad.

=== Gardens and parks ===
The Pardis Honar Park, in District 6, had cost 30 billion toman as of 2018. Some other zoological gardens and parks include the Bird Garden of Isfahan, Flower Garden of Isfahan, Nazhvan Recreational Complex, Dream Land Isfahan, and the East Park of Isfahan.

=== Historical houses ===
The Alam's House in Isfahan was historically owned by Qajar aristocrats. It has a central courtyard entirely surrounded by residential parts. The Amin's House, another Qajar-era house, contains many decorations such as stucco, mirror decorations and marquetry doors

Other historical houses in Isfahan include the Malek Vineyard, Qazvinis' House, Sheykh ol-Eslam's House, and the Constitution House of Isfahan.

=== Mausoleums and tombs ===
Mausoleums and tombs in Isfahan include the Al-Rashid Mausoleum, Baba Ghassem Mausoleum, Mausoleum of Safavid Princes, Nizam al-Mulk Tomb, Saeb Mausoleum, Shahshahan mausoleum, and Soltan Bakht Agha Mausoleum.

=== Minarets ===
Menar Jonban, built in the 14th century has an iwan measuring 10 metres (33 ft) high. Other minarets include the Ali minaret, Bagh-e-Ghoushkhane minaret, Chehel Dokhtaran minaret, Dardasht minarets, Darozziafe minarets, and Sarban minaret.

=== Museums ===
Museums in Isfahan include the Museum of Contemporary Art, Isfahan City Center museum, Museum of Decorative Arts, and the Natural History Museum of Isfahan.

=== Palaces ===
Palaces located in Isfahan include Ali Qapu, Chehel Sotoun, Hasht Behesht, and Talar-e-Ashraf.

=== Squares and streets ===
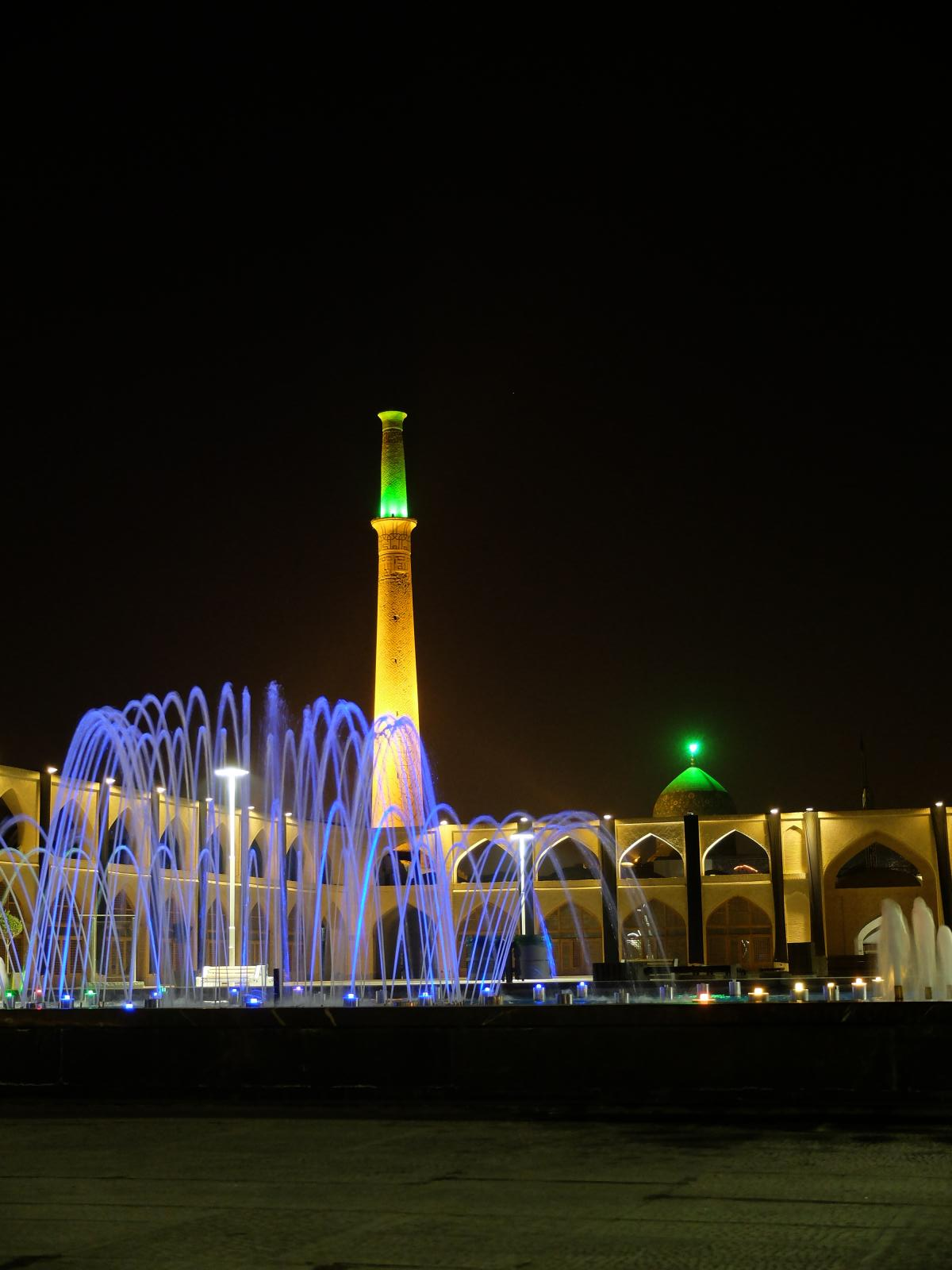
Meydan Kohne at night

Significant squares and streets in Isfahan include Chaharbagh Boulevard, Chaharbagh-e-khajou Boulevard, Meydan Kohne, Naqsh-e Jahan Square (also known as Shah Square or Imam Square), Amadegah, and Taleghani Street (also known as Shah Street).

=== Other sites ===
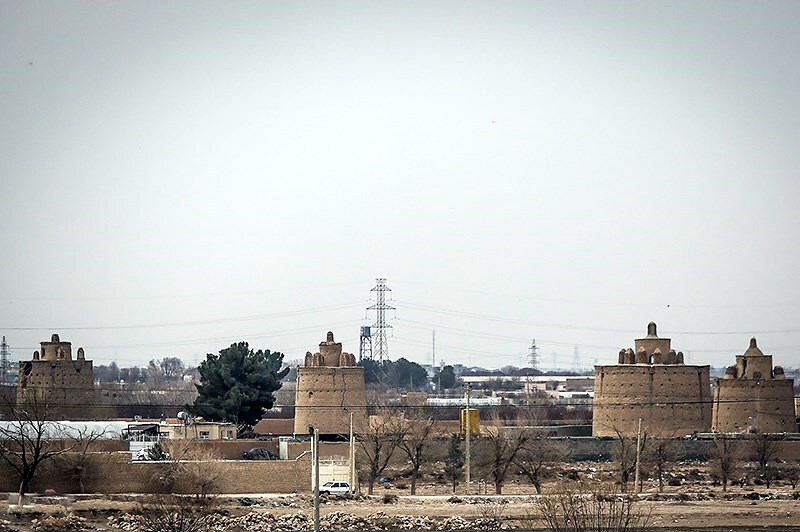
Gavart village pigeon towers

Other cultural sites include the Atashgah of Isfahan, a Zoroastrian fire temple; Isfahan Observatory; and Asarkhane Shahi.

Ancient pigeon towers are found across the city, with 22 towers in Gavart alone.

== International relations ==
Since 1994, Isfahan has been a member of the League of Historical Cities and a full member of Inter-City Intangible Cultural Cooperation Network.

There are plans to create a diplomatic district next to the Imam Khamenei International Convention Center where foreign countries would locate their consulates. China has expressed readiness to be the first country to open a consulate in the zone.

The building housing the General Consulate of the Russian Federation in Isfahan is a registered cultural heritage site.

The Isfahan municipality created a citizen diplomacy service program to encourage connections with sister cities around the world.

=== Twin towns – sister cities ===
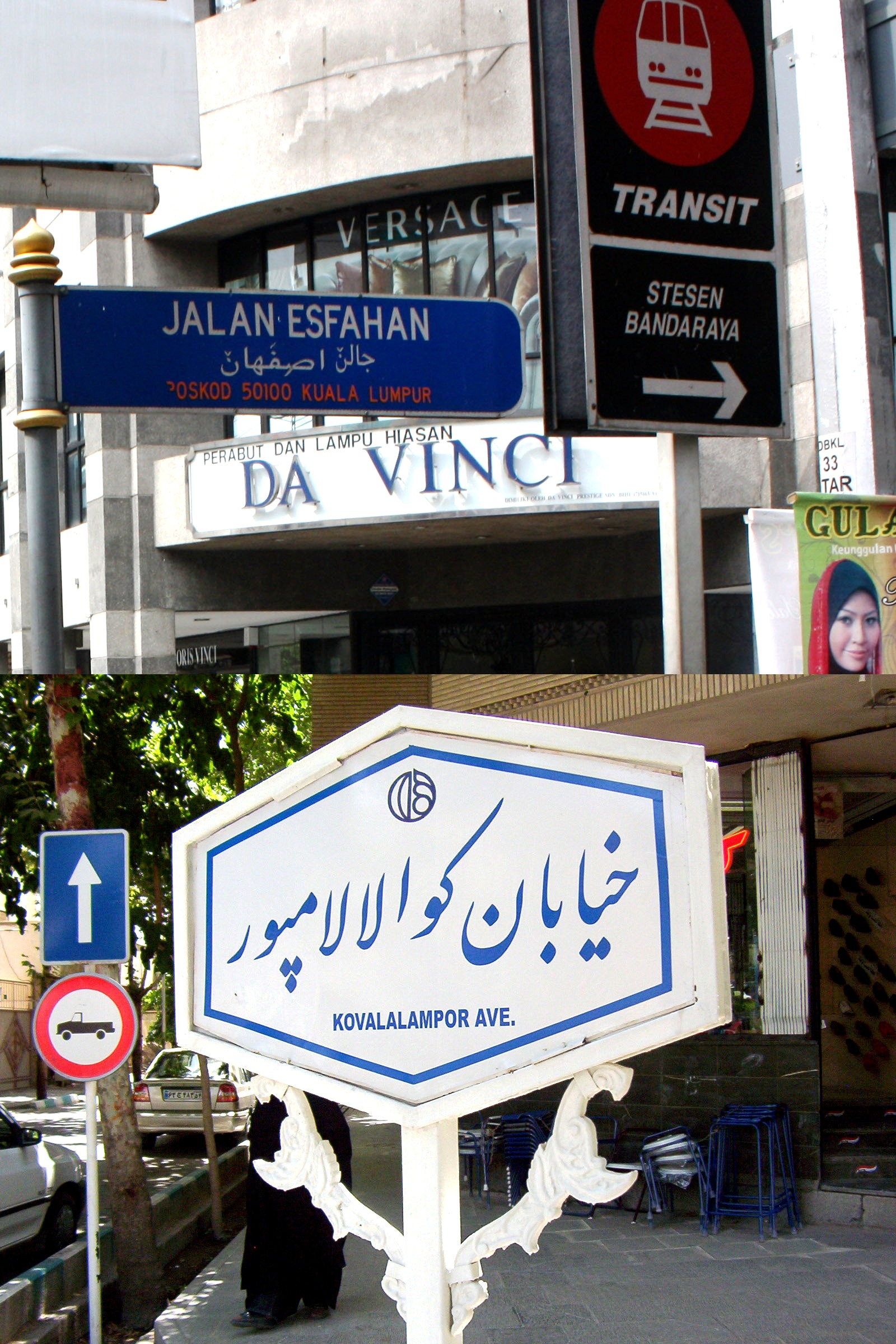
Esfahan Street in Kuala Lumpur, and Kualalampur Avenue in Isfahan

Isfahan is twinned with:

1. Xi'an, Shaanxi, China (1989)
2. Kuala Lumpur, Malaysia (1997)
3. Florence, Italy (1998)
4. Iași, Romania (1999)
5. Barcelona, Spain
6. Yerevan, Armenia (2000)
7. Freiburg im Breisgau, Germany (2000)
8. Kuwait City, Kuwait (2000)
9. Havana, Cuba (2001)
10. Lahore, Pakistan (2004)
11. Saint Petersburg, Russia (2004)
12. Dakar, Senegal (2009)
13. Baalbek, Lebanon (2010)
14. Samarkand, Uzbekistan since July 2021
15. Porto, Portugal since July 2021
16. Kazan, Russia 2025
17. Gyeongju, South Korea (2013)

=== Cooperation agreements ===
Isfahan cooperates with:

- Barcelona, Spain (2000)

In addition, the New Julfa quarter of Isfahan has friendly relations with:

- Issy-les-Moulineaux, France (2018)

== Notable people ==
Music

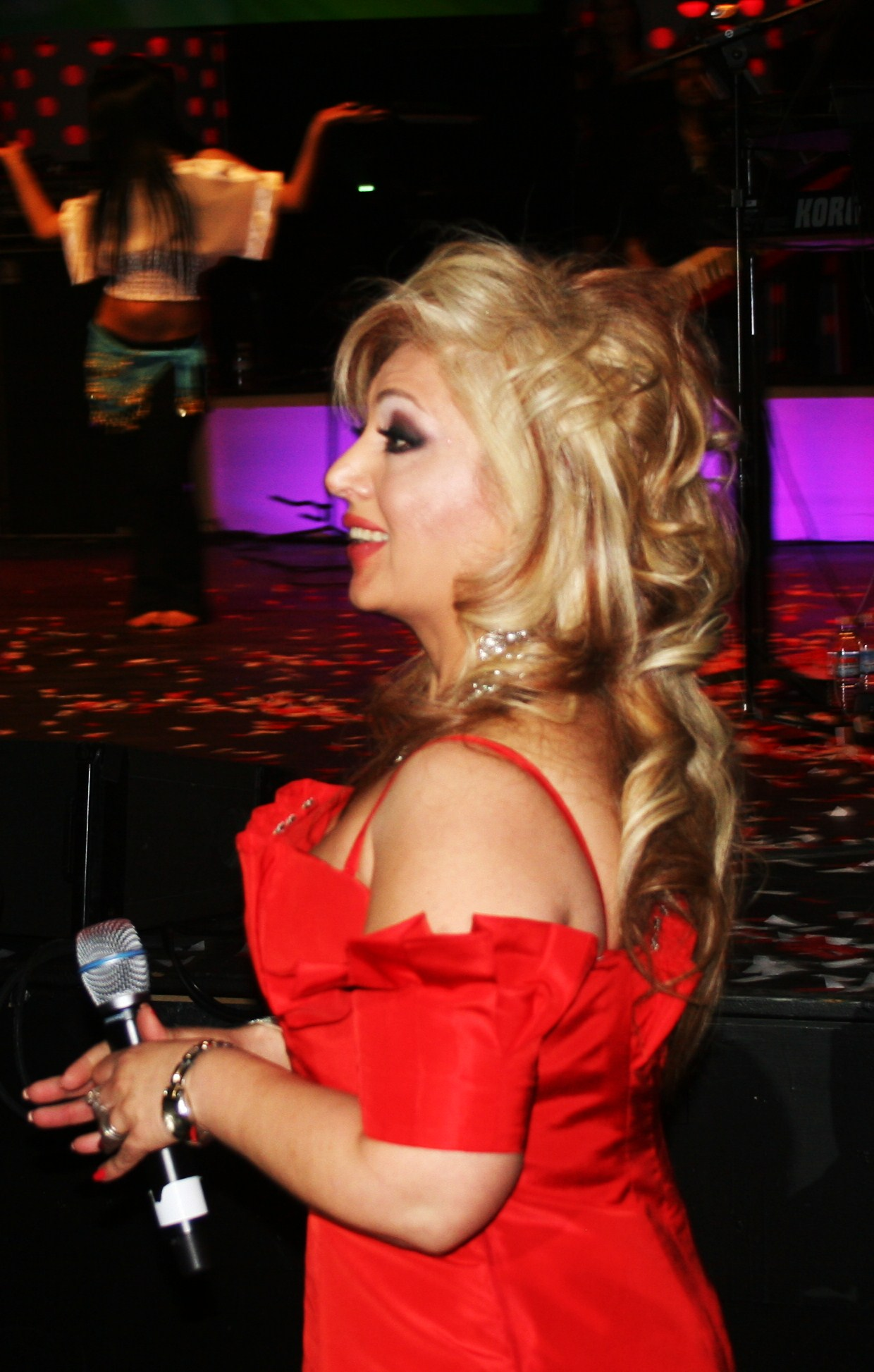
Leila Forouhar

- Alireza Eftekhari (1956–), singer
- Leila Forouhar (1959–), pop singer
- Hassan Kassai (1928–2012), musician
- Saeidi brothers (1981–), traditional singers
- Hassan Shamaizadeh (1943–), singer-songwriter
- Jalil Shahnaz (1921–2013), Tar soloist

Film

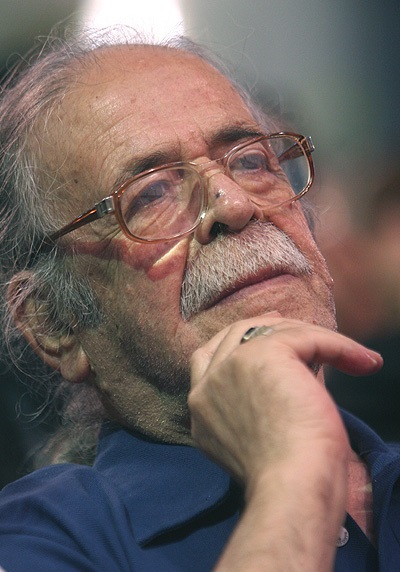
Mohammad-Ali Keshavarz

- Rasul Sadr Ameli (1953–), director
- Sara Bahrami (1983–), actor
- Homayoun Ershadi (1947–), Hollywood actor and architect
- Soraya Esfandiary-Bakhtiari (1956–2001), former princess of Iran and actress
- Bahman Farmanara (1942–), director
- Jahangir Forouhar (1916–1997), actor and father of Leila Forouhar
- Mohamad Ali Keshvarz (1930–2020), actor
- Mahdi Pakdel (1980–), actor
- Nosratollah Vahdat (1925–2020), actor

Craftsmen and painters

- Mahmoud Farshchian (1930–2025), painter and miniaturist
- Bogdan Saltanov (1630s–1703), Russian icon painter of Isfahanian Armenian origin

Political figures

- Ahmad Amir-Ahmadi (1906–1965), military leader and cabinet minister
- Ayatollah Mohammad Beheshti (1928–1981), cleric, chairman of the Council of Revolution of Iran
- Nusrat Bhutto (1929–2011), chairman of Pakistan Peoples Party from 1979 to 1983; wife of Zulfikar Ali Bhutto; mother of Benazir Bhutto
- Meir Ezri (1924–2015), Israeli ambassador to Tehran
- Hossein Fatemi, Ph. D (1919–1954), politician and foreign minister
- Mohammad-Ali Foroughi (1875–1942), politician and Prime Minister of Iran in the World War II era
- Dariush Forouhar (1928–1998), a founder and leader of the Hezb-e Mellat-e Iran (Nation of Iran Party)
- Hossein Kharrazi (1957–1987), chief of the army in the Iran–Iraq War
- Mohsen Nourbakhsh (1948–2003), economist and governor of the Central Bank of Iran
- Mohammad Javad Zarif (1960–), minister of foreign affairs and former ambassador to the United Nations

Religious figures

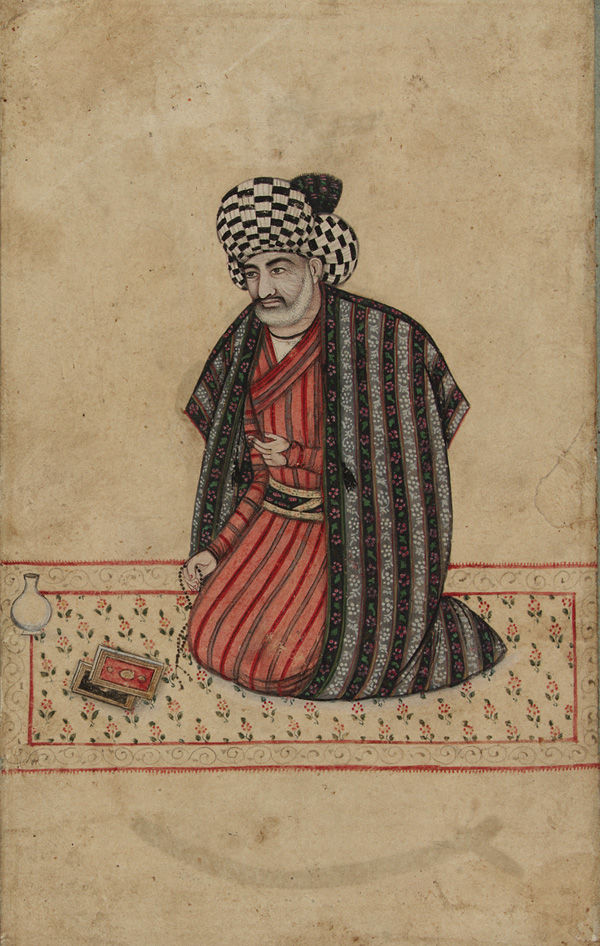
Allamah Majlisi

- Lady Amin (1886–1983), female jurisprudent, theologian, Muslim mystic ('arif), and Mujtahideh
- Seyyed Ali Qazi Askar (1954–), Iran's supreme leader representative in Hajj
- Ayatollah Mohammad Beheshti (1928–1981), cleric and chairman of the Council of Revolution of Iran
- Fethullah Qa'ravi Isfahani (1850–1920), Qajar cleric and anti-British rebel
- Allamah al-Majlisi (1616–1698), Safavid cleric and sheikh ul-Islam
- Amina Begum Bint al-Majlisi, female Safavid mujtahideh.
- Muhammad Ibn Manda (d. 1005 / AH 395), historian and Sunni Hanbali scholar of hadith
- Salman the Persian (c. 568–652), religious scholar and [[Companions of the Prophet}|companion of Muhammad]]
- Abu Nu'aym Al-Ahbahani Al-Shafi'i (d. 1038 / AH 430), Sunni Shafi'i scholar

Sportspeople

- Mohammad-Ali Asgari (1954–), football administrator
- Milad Beigi (1991–), Olympic taekwondo bronze medalist and world champion
- Abdolali Changiz (1957–), Esteghlal FC football player
- Mansour Ebrahimzadeh (1956–), Sepahan S.C. football player and head coach of Zobahan F.C.
- Ghasem Haddadifar (1983–), captain of Zobahan F.C.
- Sina Karimian (1988–), K-1 cruiserweight kickboxing champion
- Arsalan Kazemi (1990–), forward for the Oregon Ducks men's basketball team and the Iran national basketball team
- Rasoul Korbekandi (1953–), goalkeeper of the Iranian National Team
- Sohrab Moradi (1988–), Olympic weightlifting gold medalist and 105 kg category world record holder
- Moharram Navidkia (1982–), captain of Sepahan S.C.
- Mohammad Talaei (1973–), world champion wrestler
- Mahmoud Yavari (1939–2020), football player and coach of Iranian National Team

Writers and poets

- Jaleh Esfahani (1921–2007), poet
- Hatef Esfehani, Afsharid era moral poet
- Mohammad-Ali Jamālzādeh Esfahani (1892–1997), author
- Kamal ed-Din Esmail (late 12th century – early 13th century)
- Houshang Golshiri (1938–2000), writer and editor
- Jajarmi, 14th century poet and anthologist
- Hamid Mosadegh (1939–1998), poet and lawyer
- Mirza Abbas Khan Sheida (1880–1949), poet and publisher
- Shahla Sherkat (born 1956), writer, publisher, editor; a pioneer of the women's movement in modern Iran
- Saib Tabrizi (1592–1676), poet

Others

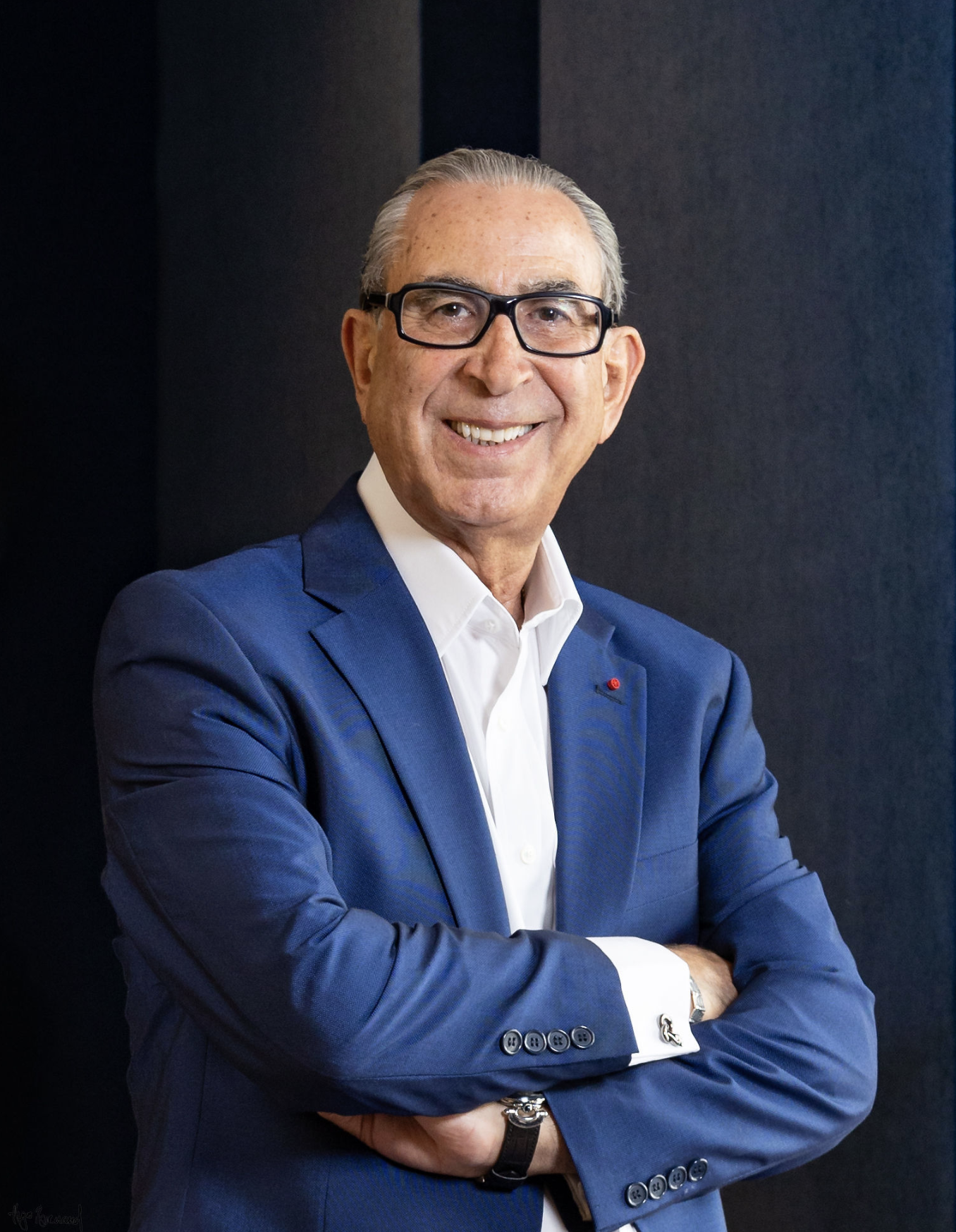
David Khalili

- Ali Abdi (1985–), human and women's rights activist
- Abd-ol-Ghaffar Amilakhori, 17th-century noble
- Adib Boroumand (1924–2017), poet, politician, lawyer, and leader of the National Front
- George Bournoutian, American-Iranian professor, historian and author
- Ispahani family, Perso-Bangladeshi business family
- Sediqeh Dowlatabadi (1882–1961), feminist activist, journalist, educator and one of the pioneering figures in the Persian women's movement
- Mahlagha Jaberi (born 1989), influencer and Instagram model
- Nasser David Khalili (1945–), British property developer, art collector and philanthropist
- Alexander Kostellow (1897–1954), Iranian-American industrial designer
- Jack Mahfar (1931–), businessman
- Arthur Upham Pope (1881–1969), American archaeologist and art historian, buried near Khaju Bridge
- Alexandre de Rhodes (1591–1660), French Jesuit and designer of Vietnamese alphabet, buried in the city's Armenian cemetery

== 2025 ammunition factory explosion ==
On 29 April 2025, an explosion occurred at a company warehouse of Ava Nar, a Persian gunpowder manufacturer, located in central Isfahan. In the explosion two people were killed and two others were injured. The cause of the explosion is yet to be known. This event took place only three days after the explosion at the Shahid Rajaee port.

== Gallery ==
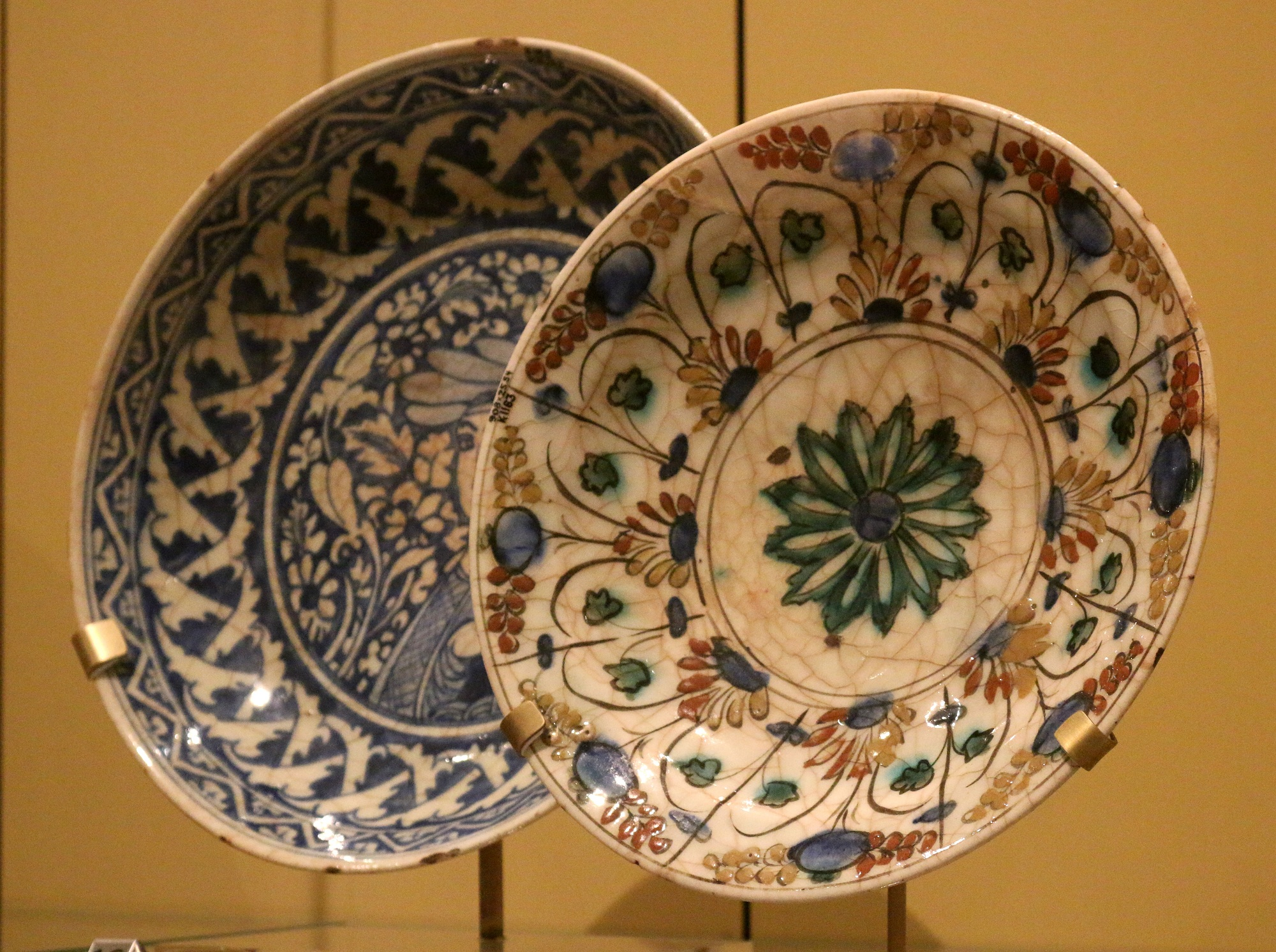
Persian pottery from the city of Isfahan, 17th century

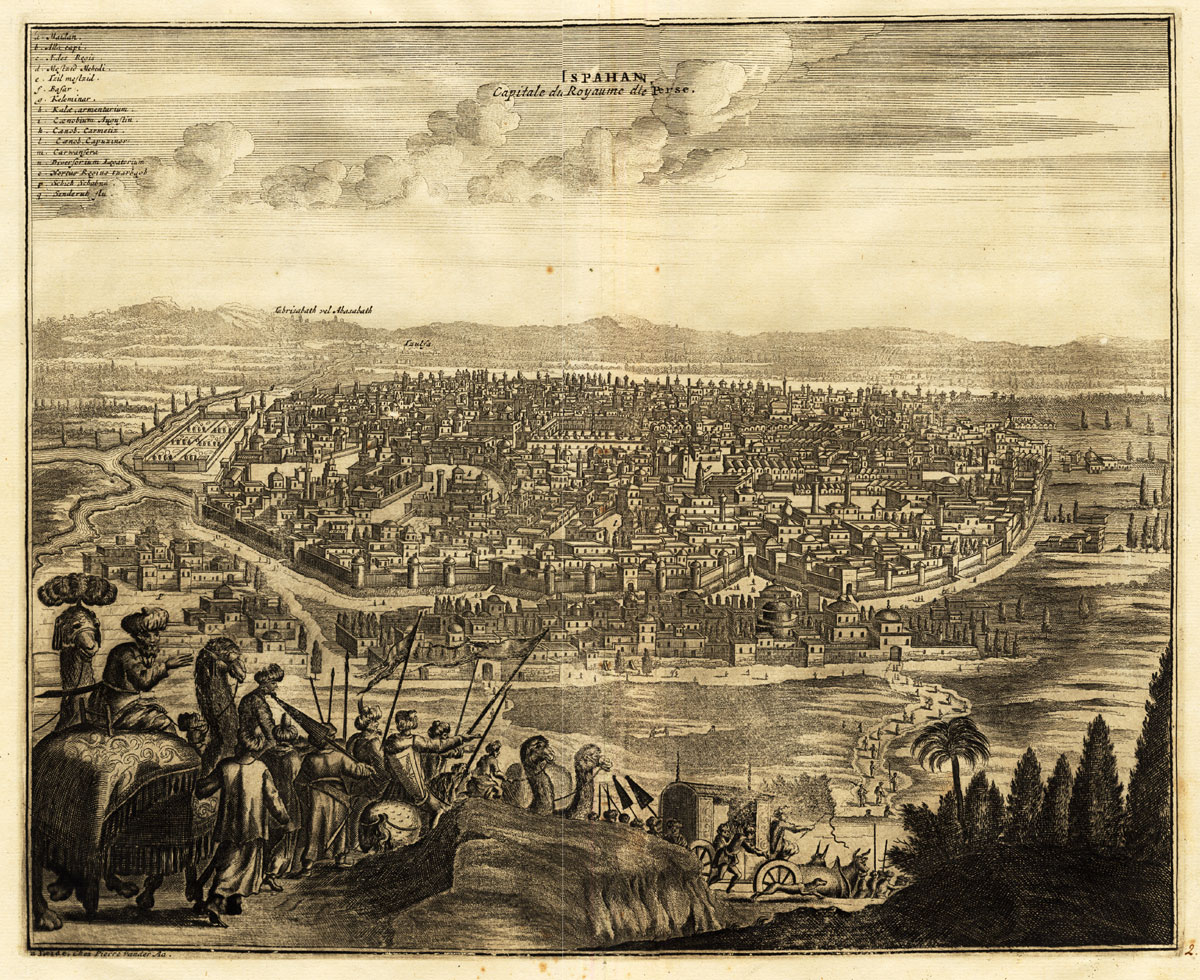
Isfahan, capital of the Kingdom of Persia

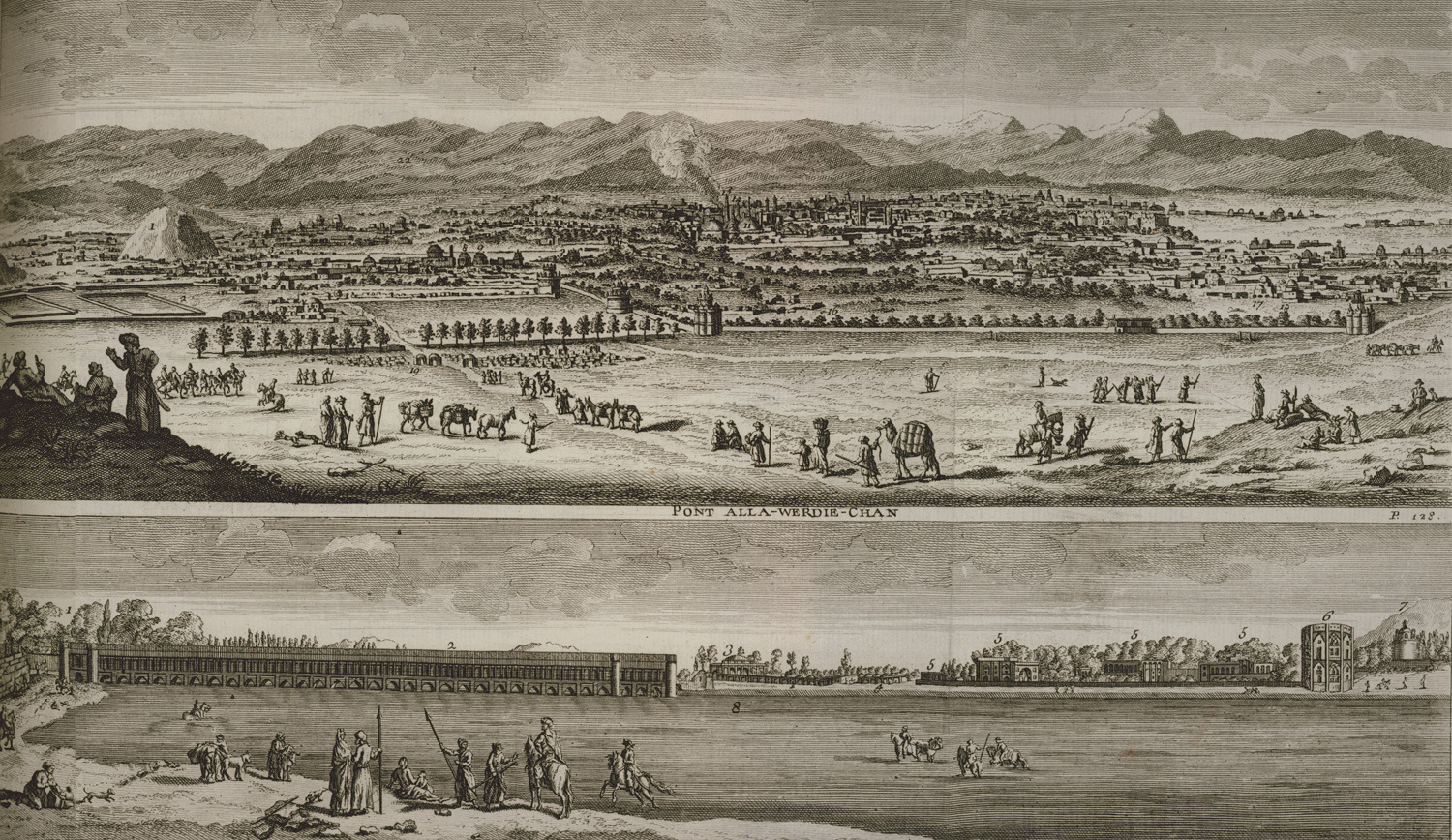
Si-o-se-pol Bridge by Cornelis de Bruijn, 1705

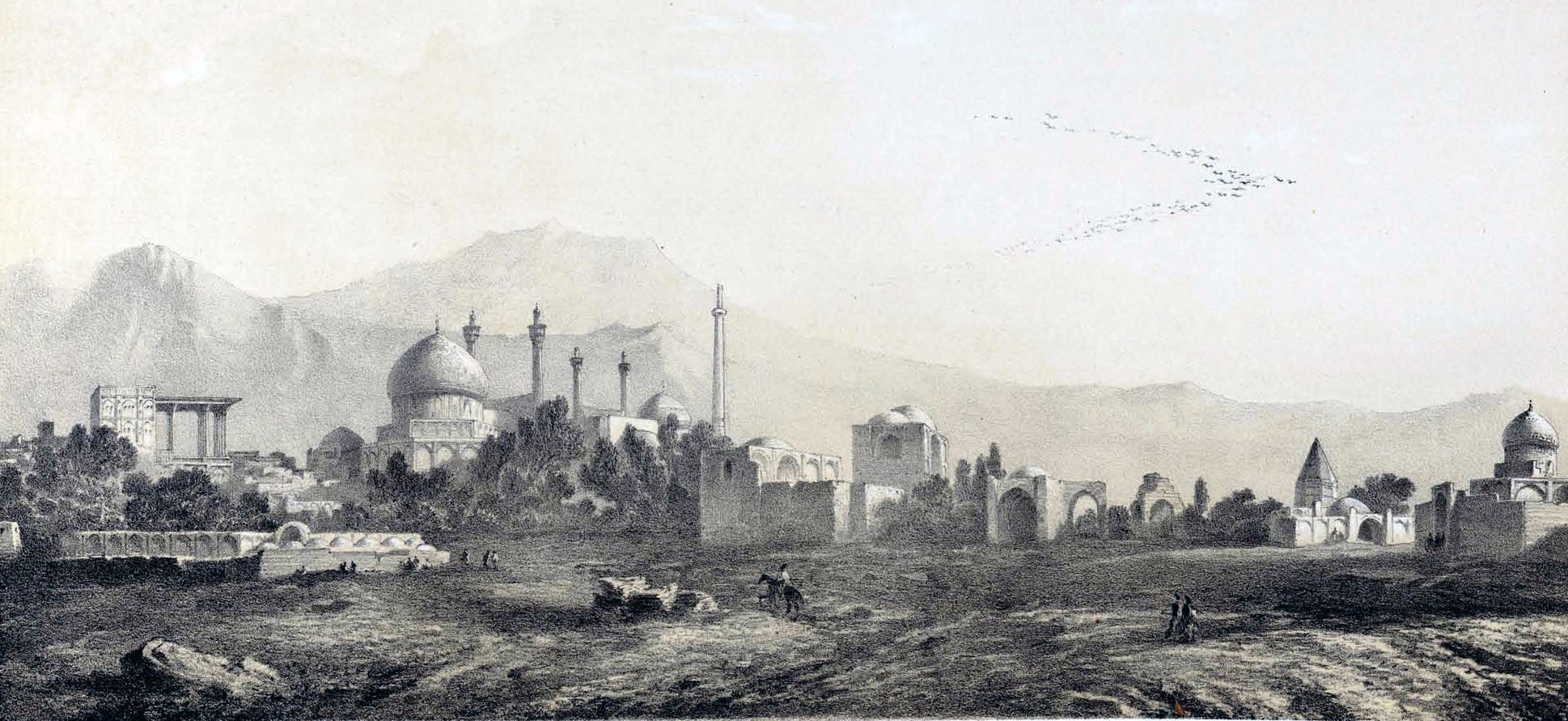
Isfahan to the south side, drawing by Eugène Flandin

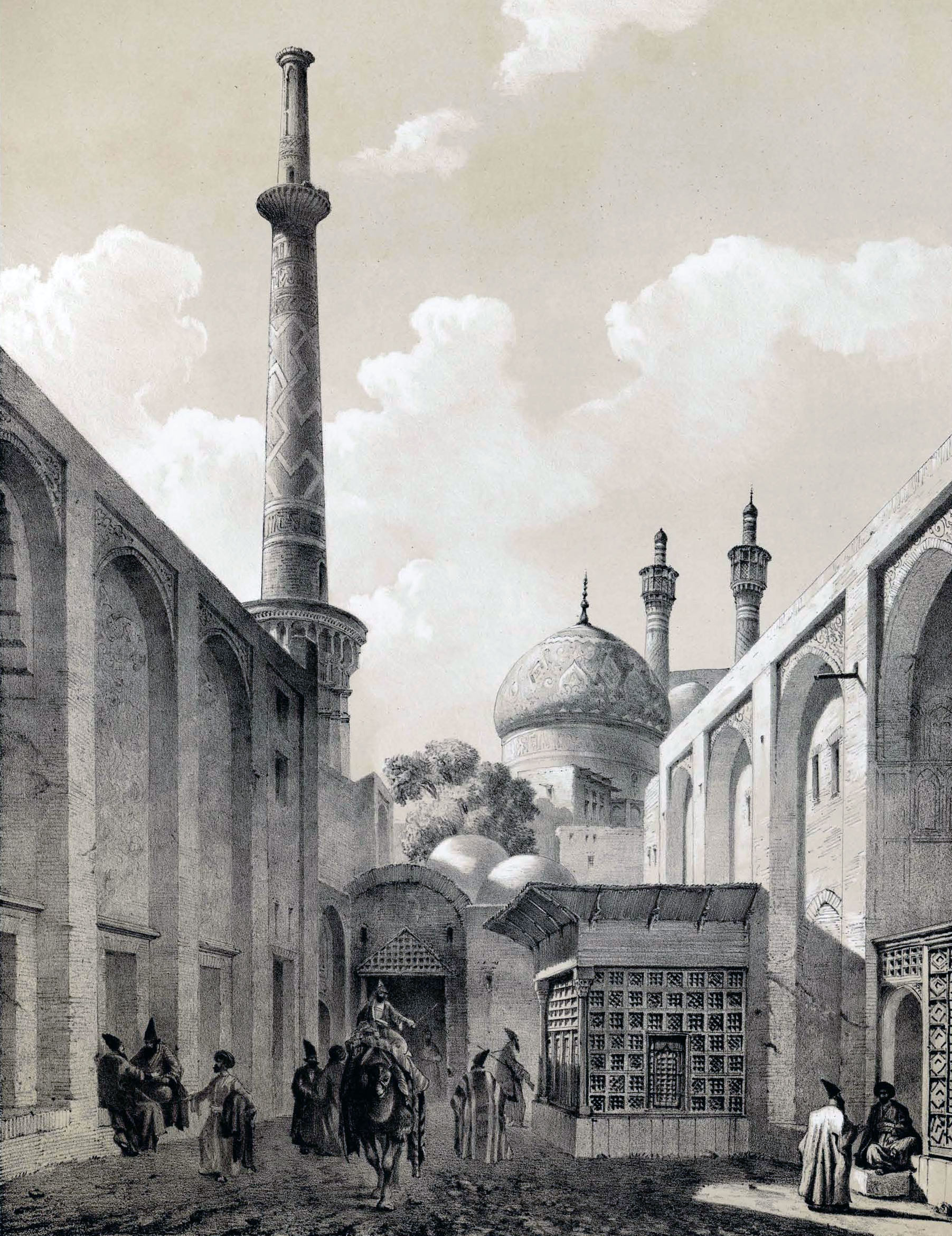
Ali minaret, 1840, drawing by Eugène Flandin

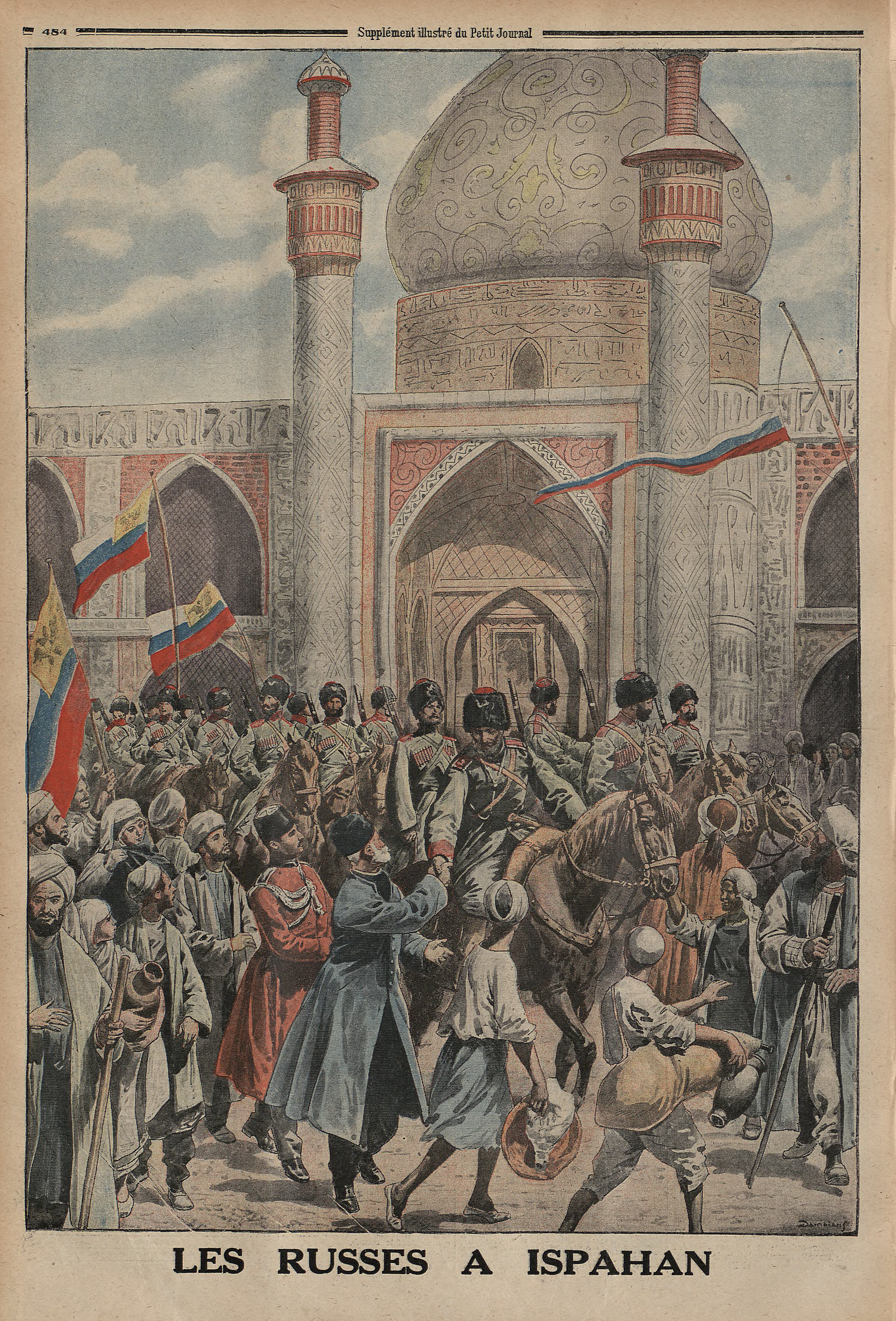
Russian army in Isfahan in the 1890s

== See also ==
- 15861 Ispahan
- Acid attacks on women in Isfahan
- Courts of Isfahan
- Isfahan National Holy Association
- Isfahan Quran
- Isfahan Seminary
- Islamic City Council of Isfahan
- Isfahan Zoo
- List of the historical structures in the Isfahan province
- Prix d'Ispahan

== Notes ==
Preceded by Rey	Capital of Seljuq Empire (Persia); 1051–1118	Succeeded by Hamadan (Western capital); Merv (Eastern capital)
Preceded by Qazvin	Capital of Iran (Persia); 1598–1736	Succeeded by Mashhad
Preceded by Qazvin	Capital of Safavid dynasty 1598–1722	Succeeded by -
