= List of historical structures in Isfahan province =

This is a list of historical structures in Isfahan Province, Iran.

== Bazaars ==
	Structure	Location	County	Era	Century	Style	Picture
1	Bazaar of Isfahan	Isfahan	Isfahan	Safavid dynasty	16	Isfahani	
2	Qeysarie Bazaar	Isfahan	Isfahan	Safavid dynasty	17	Isfahani	
3	Qeysarie Gate	Isfahan	Isfahan	Safavid dynasty	17	Isfahani	

== Bridges ==
	Structure	Location	County	Era	Century	Style	Picture
1	Joubi Bridge	Isfahan	Isfahan	Safavid dynasty	17	Isfahani	
2	Khaju Bridge	Isfahan	Isfahan	Safavid dynasty	17	Isfahani	
3	Marnan Bridge	Isfahan	Isfahan	Safavid dynasty	16	Isfahani	
4	Shahrestan bridge	Isfahan	Isfahan	Seljuq dynasty	11	Razi	
5	Si-o-se Pol	Isfahan	Isfahan	Safavid dynasty	17	Isfahani	

== Caravanserais ==
	Structure	Location	County	Era	Century	Style	Picture
1	Abbasi Hotel	Isfahan	Isfahan	Safavid dynasty	17	Isfahani	
2	Abbasi Caravanserai of Gaz	Gaz-e Borkhar	Shahinshar va Meymeh	Safavid dynasty	17	Isfahani	

== Churches ==
	Structure	Location	County	Era	Century	Style	Picture
1	Bedkhem Church	Isfahan	Isfahan	Safavid dynasty	17	Isfahani	
2	St. Georg Church	Isfahan	Isfahan	Safavid dynasty	17	Isfahani	
3	St. Mary Church	Isfahan	Isfahan	Safavid dynasty	17	Isfahani	
4	Vank Cathedral	Isfahan	Isfahan	Safavid dynasty	17	Isfahani	

== Fire temples ==
	Structure	Location	County	Era	Century	Style	Picture
1	Fire temple of Isfahan	Isfahan	Isfahan	Sasanian Empire	3rd	Parthian	

== Gardens ==
	Structure	Location	County	Era	Century	Style	Picture
1	Fin Garden	Kashan	Kashan	Safavid and Qajar dynasty	17 until 19	Isfahani	

== Hammams ==
	Structure	Location	County	Era	Century	Style	Picture
1	Ali Gholi Agha hammam	Isfahan	Isfahan	Safavid dynasty	18	Isfahani	
2	Jarchi hammam	Isfahan	Isfahan	Safavid dynasty	17	Isfahani	
3	Shah Ali hammam	Isfahan	Isfahan	Safavid dynasty	16 or 17	Esfahani	
4	Shaykh Bahai hammam	Isfahan	Isfahan	Safavid dynasty	17	Esfahani	

|

== Houses ==
	Structure	Location	County	Era	Century	Style	Picture
1	Abbāsi House	Kashan	Kashan	Qajar dynasty	18	Isfahani	
2	Alam's House	Isfahan	Isfahan	Qajar dynasty	18	Isfahani	
3	Amin's House	Isfahan	Isfahan	Qajar dynasty	19	non-traditional	
4	Borujerdis House	Kashan	Kashan	Qajar dynasty	19	non-traditional	
5	Malek Vineyard	Isfahan	Isfahan	Afsharid dynasty	18	Isfahani	
6	Qazvinis' House	Isfahan	Isfahan	Qajar dynasty	19	non-traditional	
7	Sheykh ol-Eslam's House	Isfahan	Isfahan	Qajar dynasty	19	non-traditional	
8	Tabātabāei House	Kashan	Kashan	Qajar dynasty	19	non-traditional	
9	Adib Boroumand Cultural Center	Gaz-e Borkhar	Shahin Shar va Meymeh	Qajar dynasty	19	non-traditional	

== Imamzadehs ==
	Structure	Location	County	Era	Century	Style	Picture
1	Emamzadeh Ahmad	Isfahan	Isfahan	Safavid dynasty	16	Isfahani	
2	Emamzadeh Ebrahim	Kashan	Kashan	Qajar dynasty	19	not-traditional	
3	Emamzadeh Esmail	Isfahan	Isfahan	Seljuq and Safavid dynasty	11 & 16	Razi and Isfahani	
4	Emamzadeh Soltan Mir Ahmad	Kashan	Kashan	Seljuq and Safavid dynasty	16	Isfahani	
5	Emamzadeh Mir Neshaneh	Kashan	Kashan	Safavid dynasty	16	Esfahani	
6	Emamzadeh Haroun-e-Velayat	Isfahan	Isfahan	Safavid dynasty	16	Isfahani	
7	Emamzadeh Jafar	Isfahan	Isfahan	Ilkhante	14	Azari	
8	Emamzadeh Panje Shah	Kashan	Kashan	Seljuq dynasty	11 or 12	Razi	
9	Emamzadeh Pir Davoud	Ghamsar	Kashan	Safavid dynasty	16 or 17	Isfahani	
10	Emamzadeh Shah Yalan	Kashan	Kashan	Aq Qoyunlu	15	Azari	
11	Emamzadeh Shah Zeyd	Isfahan	Isfahan	Safavid dynasty	16	Isfahani	
12	Emamzadeh Taher and Mansour	Kashan	Kashan	Safavid dynasty	16	Isfahani	
13	Emamzadeh Shah Nematollah	Gaz-e Borkhar	Shahinshar va Meymeh	Safavid dunsty	16	Isfahani	

== Khanqah ==
	Structure	Location	County	Era	Century	Style	Picture
1	Tohidkhaneh	Isfahan	Isfahan	Safavid dynasty	16	Isfahani	

== Libraries ==
	Structure	Location	County	Era	Century	Style	Picture
1	Sarouyeh	Isfahan	Isfahan	Achaemenid Empire	6 or 5 B.C	Parsian	

== Mausoleums ==
	Structure	Location	County	Era	Century	Style	Picture
1	Ali ebn-e Sahl mausoleum	Isfahan	Isfahan	Abbasid Caliphate	9	Khorasani	
2	Al-Rashid Mausoleum	Isfahan	Isfahan	Seljuq dynasty	12	Razi	
3	Baba Ghassem Mausoleum	Isfahan	Isfahan	Ilkhanate	14	Azari	
4	Chehel Dokhtaran mausoleum	Kashan	Kashan	Ilkhanate	13 or 14	Azari	
5	Khaje Taj od-Din mausoleum	Kashan	Kashan	Timurid dynasty	15	Azari	
6	Mausoleum of Safavid Princes	Isfahan	Isfahan	Safavid dynasty	17	Isfahani	
7	Mausoleum of Shah Abbas I	Kashan	Kashan	Safavid dynasty	17	Isfahani	
8	Pir Bakran mausoleum	Pir Bakran	Falavarjan	Ilkhanate	13	Azari	
9	Shahshahan mausoleum	Isfahan	Isfahan	Timurid dynasty	15	Azari	
10	Soltan Bakht Agha Mausoleum	Isfahan	Isfahan	Muzaffarids	14	Azari	

== Minarets ==
	Structure	Location	County	Era	Century	Style	Picture
1	Ali minaret	Isfahan	Isfahan	Buyid dynasty	11	Razi	
2	Bagh-e-Ghoushkhane minaret	Isfahan	Isfahan	Muzaffarids	14	Azari	
3	Chehel Dokhtaran minaret	Isfahan	Isfahan	Seljuq dynasty	12	Razi	
4	Dardasht minarets	Isfahan	Isfahan	Muzaffarids	14	Azari	
5	Darozziafe minarets	Isfahan	Isfahan	Ilkhanate	14	Azari	
6	Golpayegan minaret	Golpayegan	Golpayegan	Sejuq dynasty	11	Razi	
7	Menar Jonban	Karladan village	Isfahan	Safavid dynasty	16	Isfahani	
8	Rahrovan minaret	Rahrovan village	Isfahan	Seljuq dynasty	12	Razi	
9	Sarban minaret	Isfahan	Isfahan	Seljuq dynasty	12	Razi	
10	Zeyn od-Din minaret	Kashan	Kashan	Timurid dynasty	15	Azari	
11	Ziyar minaret	Ziyar village	Isfahan	Seljuq dynasty	12	Razi	

== Mosques ==
	Structure	Location	County	Era	Century	Style	Picture
1	Agha Nour mosque	Isfahan	Isfahan	Safavid dynasty	17	Isfahani	
2	Barsian mosque and minaret	Barsian village	Isfahan	Seljuq dynasty	11 & 12	Razi	
3	Darvazeh No mosque	Isfahan	Isfahan	Qajar dynasty	19	non-traditional	
4	Dashti mosque	Dashti village	Isfahan	Ilkhanate	13	Azari	
5	Gar mosque and minaret	Gar village	Isfahan	Seljuq dynasty	12	Razi	
6	Hafshuye mosque	Hafschuye village	Isfahan	Seljuq dynasty	11 or 12	Razi	
7	Hakim Mosque	Isfahan	Isfahan	Safavid dynasty	17	Isfahani	
8	Ilchi mosque	Isfahan	Isfahan	Safavid dynasty	17	Isfahani	
9	Imam Mosque Isfahan	Isfahan	Isfahan	Safavid dynasty	17	Isfahani	
10	Jameh mosque of Golpayegan	Golpayegan	Golpayegan	Seljuq dynasty	12	Razi	
11	Jameh Mosque of Isfahan	Isfahan	Isfahan	Samanid, Buyid and Seljuq dynasty	9 until 11	Razi	
12	Jameh Mosque of Kashan	Kashan	Kashan	Seljuq dynasty	11	Razi	
13	Jameh mosque of Meymeh	Meymeh	Shahin Shahr and Meymeh	Safavid dynasty	17	Isfahani	
14	Jarchi mosque	Isfahan	Isfahan	Safavid dynasty	17	Isfahani	
15	Kaj mosque	Kaj village	Isfahan	Ilkhanate	14	Azari	
16	Khozan mosque	Khomeyni Shahr	Khomeyni Shahr	Timurid dynasty	15	Azari	
17	Lonban mosque	Isfahan	Isfahan	Safavid dynasty	17	Isfahani	
18	Maghsoudbeyk Mosque	Isfahan	Isfahan	Safavid dynasty	17	Isfahani	
19	Mesri mosque	Isfahan	Isfahan	Safavid dynasty	17	Isfahani	
20	Meydan mosque	Kashan	Kashan	Seljuq dynasty and Ilkhanid	11 or 12	Razi	
21	Mohammad Jafar Abadei mosque	Isfahan	Isfahan	Qajar dynasty	19	non-traditional	
22	Rahim Khan mosque	Isfahan	Isfahan	Qajar dynasty	19	non-traditional	
23	Roknolmolk mosque	Isfahan	Isfahan	Qajar dynasty	20	non-traditional	
24	Safa mosque	Isfahan	Isfahan	Qajar dynasty	19	non-traditional	
25	Seyyed mosque	Isfahan	Isfahan	Qajar dynasty	19	non-traditional	
26	Sheikh Lotfollah Mosque	Isfahan	Isfahan	Safavid dynasty	17	Isfahani	
27	Tabriziha Mosque	Kashan	Kashan	Qajar dynasty	19	non-traditional	
28	Jame mosque of Gaz	Gaz-e Borkhar	Shahinshar va Meymeh	Selijuk synasty	11	Isfahani	

== Museums ==
	Structure	Location	County	Era	Century	Style	Picture
1	Contemporary Arts Museum Isfahan	Isfahan	Isfahan	Safavid dynasty	16 or 17	Isfahani	
2	Museum of Decorative Arts	Isfahan	Isfahan	Safavid dynasty	16 or 17	Isfahani	
3	Natural History Museum of Isfahan	Isfahan	Isfahan	Timurid dynasty	15	Azari	

== Palaces ==
	Structure	Location	County	Era	Century	Style	Picture
1	Ālī Qāpū	Isfahan	Isfahan	Safavid dynasty	16	Isfahani	
2	Chehel Sotoun	Isfahan	Isfahan	Safavid dynasty	17	Isfahani	
3	Hasht Behesht	Isfahan	Isfahan	Safavid dynasty	17	Isfahani	

== Schools ==
	Structure	Location	County	Era	Century	Style	Picture
1	Chaharbagh School	Isfahan	Isfahan	Safavid dynasty	17 & 18	Isfahani	
2	Emamieh school	Isfahan	Isfahan	Ilkhante	14	Azari	
3	Emam school	Kashan	Kashan	Qajar dynasty	19	Isfahani	
4	Kassegaran school	Isfahan	Isfahan	Safavid dynasty	17	Isfahani	
5	Nimavar school	Isfahan	Isfahan	Safavid dynasty	17	Isfahani	
6	Sadr school	Isfahan	Isfahan	Qajar dynasty	19	Isfahani	

== Strongholds ==
	Structure	Location	County	Era	Century	Style	Picture
1	Gouged stronghold	Gouged	Golpayegan	Safavid dynasty	16	Isfahani	
2	Jalali castle	Kashan	Kashan	Seljuq dynasty	11	Razi	

== Towers ==
	Structure	Location	County	Era	Century	Style	Picture
1	Seven Towers of Kharun	Najafabad	Najafabad	Safavid dynasty	16 or 17	Isfahani	

== Bibliography ==
- Sussan Babaie (2012). "Isfahan: Monuments: Bibliography". Encyclopædia Iranica.
