= Chehel Dokhtaran Mausoleum =

Mausoleum in Kashan, Isfahan, Iran

- (آرامگاه) چهل‌دختران
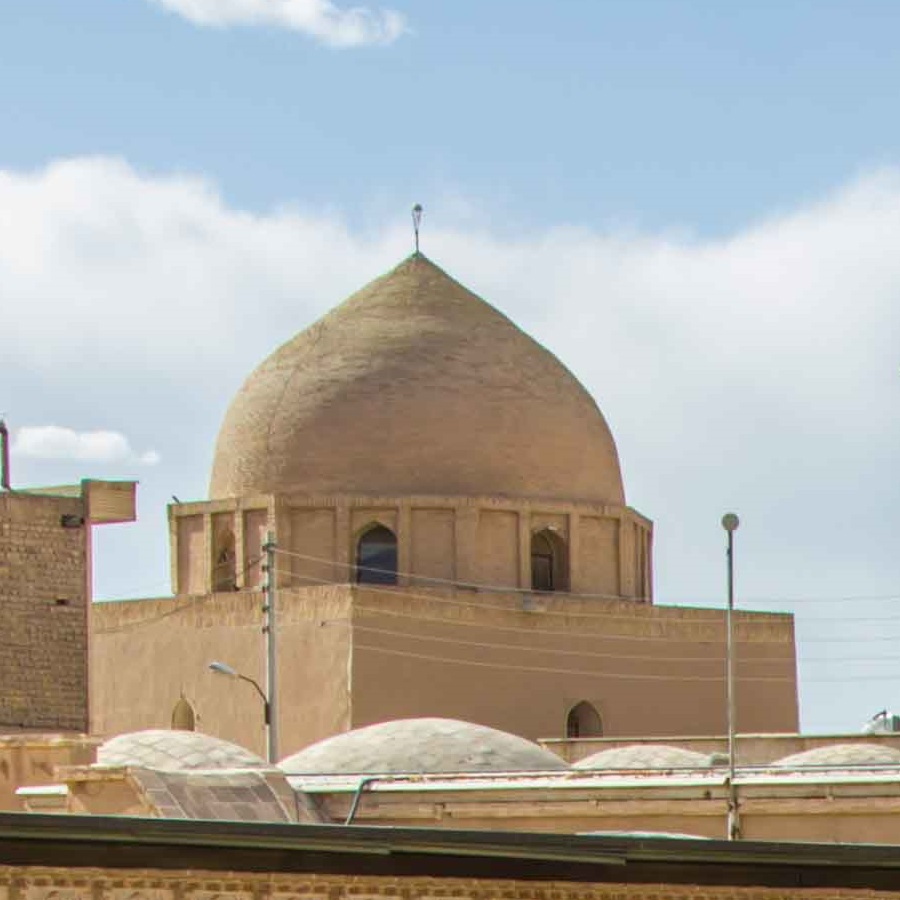
- Mausoleum as seen from Tabatabai House

- Location of the complex in Iran

Religion
- Affiliation: Islam
- Ecclesiastical or organisational status: Mausoleum
- Status: Active

Location
- Location: Kashan, Isfahan province
- Country: Iran
- Interactive map of Chehel Dokhtaran Mausoleum
- Coordinates: 33°58′30″N 51°26′17″E

Architecture
- Type: Islamic architecture
- Style: Azari; Ilkhanid
- Completed: 13th century CE

Specifications
- Length: 10.4 m (34 ft)
- Width: 10.4 m (34 ft)
- Dome: One
- Materials: Bricks; plaster; tiles; cob

Iran National Heritage List
- Official name: Chehel Dokhtaran Mausoleum
- Type: Built
- Designated: 30 September 1967
- Reference no.: 768
- Conservation organization: Cultural Heritage, Handicrafts and Tourism Organization of Iran

The Chehel Dokhtaran Mausoleum (Persian: (آرامگاه) چهل‌دختران" Arabic: ضريح جهل دختاران) is a mausoleum complex, located in Kashan, in the province of Isfahan, Iran. The complex is located to the west of Emamzadeh Soltan Mir Ahmad. The mausoleum was built in the 13th century CE, during the Ilkhanid era. Its high simple unadorned dome is the hallmark of Ilkhanid architecture.

The complex was added to the Iran National Heritage List on 30 September 1967, administered by the Cultural Heritage, Handicrafts and Tourism Organization of Iran.

== Etymology ==
Chehel Dokhtaran means forty girls in the Persian language, but it is unknown for what reason this name has been given to the building. Some people believe that this building had been a mosque and school special to women just like Chehel Dokhtaran minaret and it was built like the minaret in 1112.

== See also ==
- List of the historical structures in the Isfahan province
- List of mausoleums in Iran
- Islam in Iran
