= Raran minaret =

Minaret in Isfahan, Iran

Raran Minaret
- منار راران
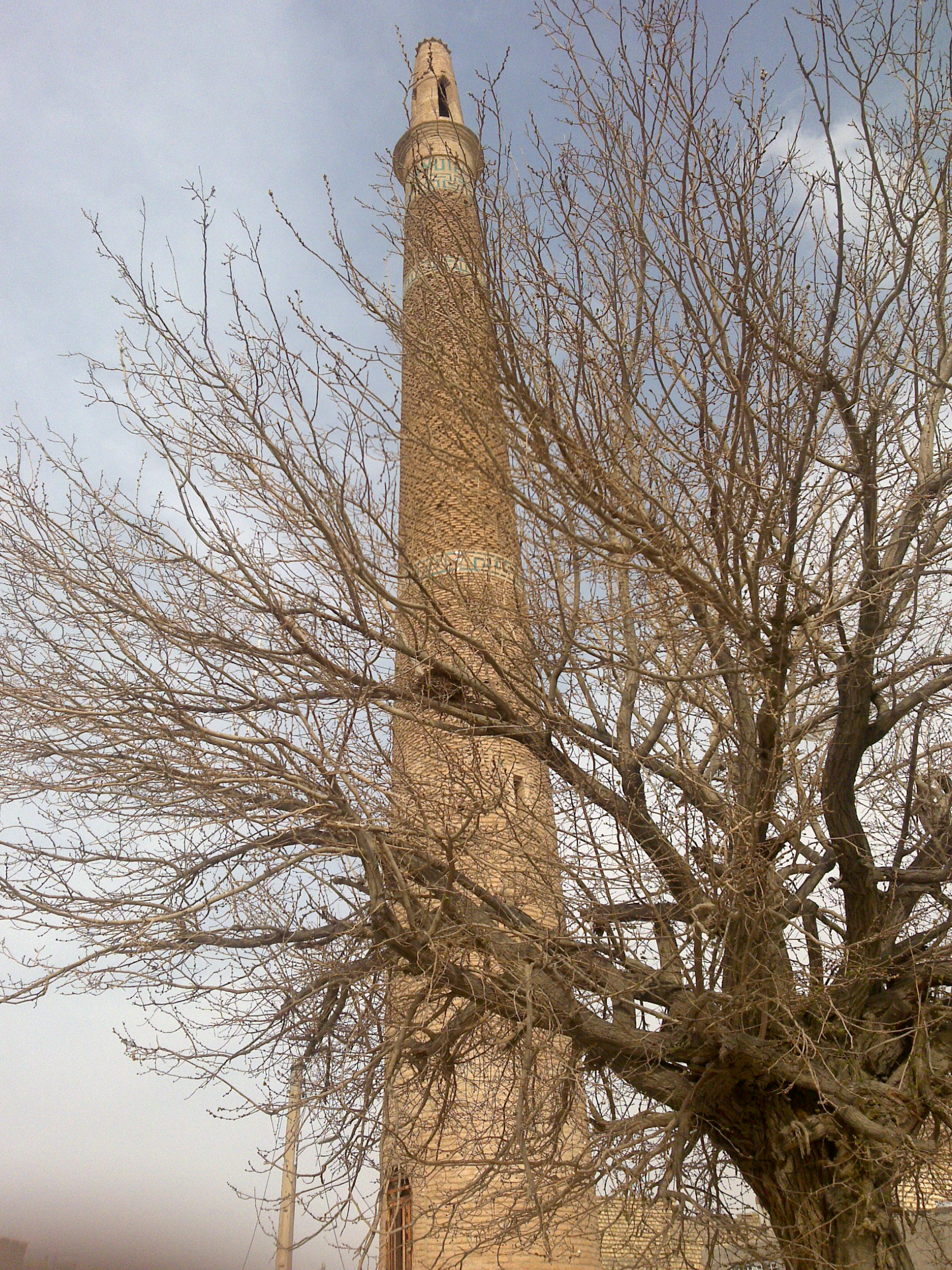
- The minaret in winter 2014

- Location within Iran
- Alternative names: Rahrovan minaret; Manar-i Rahrovan

General information
- Status: Active lighthouse
- Type: Minaret
- Architectural style: Islamic architecture: Razi
- Location: Raran village, Esfahan, Isfahan province, Iran
- Coordinates: 32°40′37″N 51°45′17″E
- Completed: 1159 CE

Height
- Height: 30 m (98 ft)

Technical details
- Material: Bricks, mortar

Iran National Heritage List
- Official name: Raran Minaret
- Type: Minaret
- Designated: 1935
- Reference no.: 233
- Conservation organization: Cultural Heritage, Handicrafts and Tourism Organization of Iran

The Raran minaret, also known as the Rahrovan minaret (Persian: منار راران, romanized: Manar-i Rahrovan) and the Rarun minaret, is a 30-metre-high (98 ft) minaret, located in Raran village, 6 kilometres (3.7 mi) northeast of Esfahan, in the province of Isfahan, Iran.

The minaret was added to the Iran National Heritage List on 7 December 1935, administered by the Cultural Heritage, Handicrafts and Tourism Organization of Iran.

== Overview ==
The minaret was completed in 1159 CE, during the Seljuq era and is believed to have served as a lighthouse. The minaret has a rectangular base with four flanges at the corners. The diameter of the shaft decreases smoothly over the height of the minaret with no break until the top. The minaret has almost kept its original shape; however its inscriptions have been damaged severely. Its decorations are simple, featuring a stripe of rhombic shapes around the minaret, in which the names of Mohammad and Ali are repeated. On the top of the minaret, there is a window for muezzin and signal fire for orientation of caravans and passengers in the desert.

It is the fourth oldest minaret in Isfahan province after the Ali minaret, Sarban minaret and Ziyar minaret.

== See also ==
- Islam in Iran
- List of historical structures in Isfahan province
