= Safa Mosque =

The Safa Mosque may refer to:

- Safa Mosque, Goa, in India
- Safa Mosque, Isfahan, in Iran
- Safa Camii, in Turkey
