= Qazvinis' House =

Historic house in Isfahan, Iran

- خانه قزوینی ها
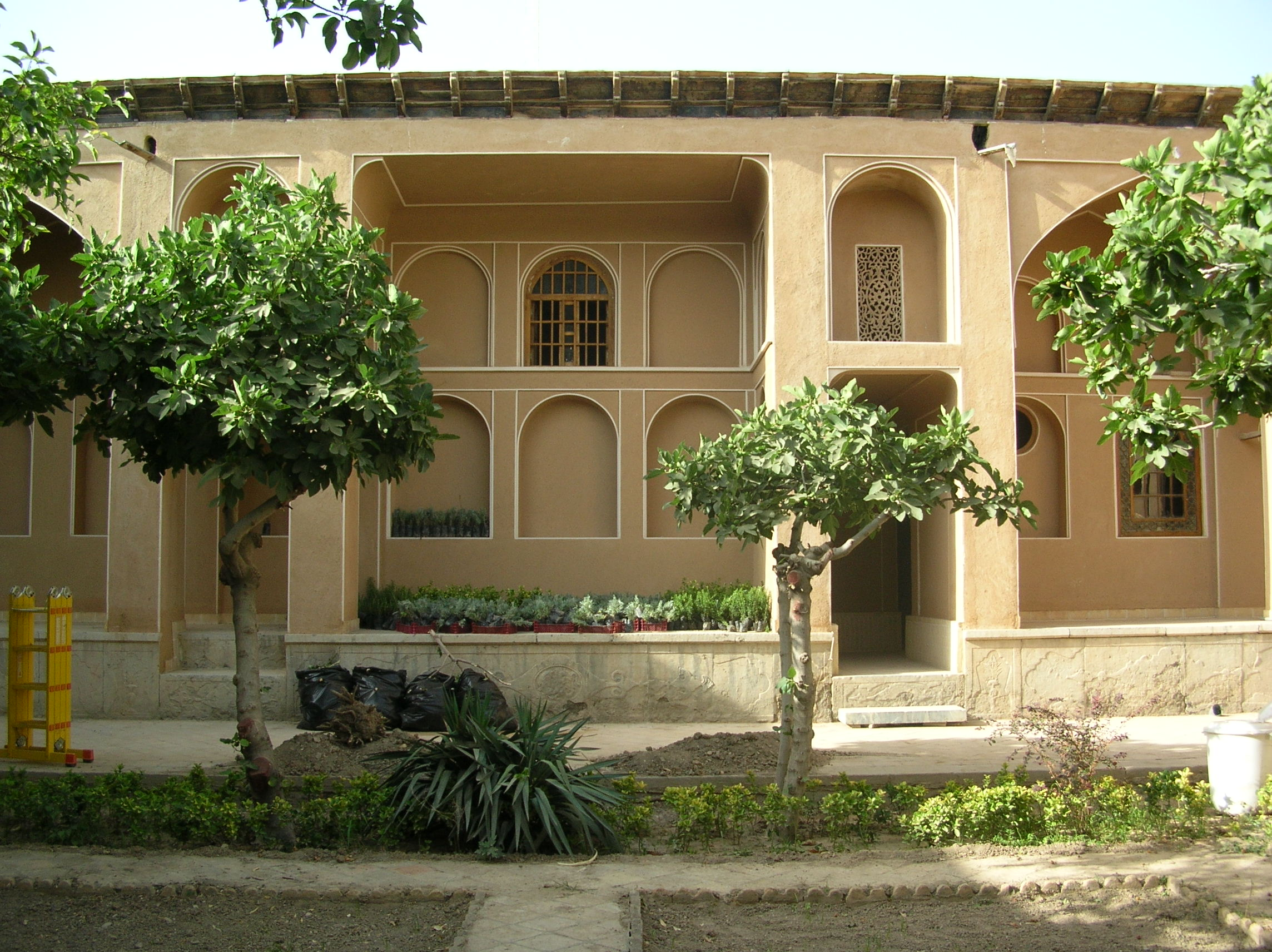

- Location within Iran

General information
- Status: Cultural
- Type: house
- Architectural style: Qajar style
- Location: Shahshahan quarter, Isfahan, Iran
- Coordinates: 32.6731°N 51.6841°E

The Qazvinis' House is a historic house constructed during the reign of Naser al-Din Shah Qajar in Isfahan, Iran.

Although there are many historic houses in Isfahan, few of them are open for tourists. Qazvinis' house is one of these few houses. The house has a beautiful structure and masterly plan. It has multiple yards, which are surrounded by many rooms. The northern part of each yard is higher and is more important than the other parts. The notable exterior parts of the structure are the following:

- a dais, decorated by an exquisite muqarnas
- doors of the dais with painted glasses, which connect the dais to different rooms.
- a reception hall on the western side, decorated by stucco and cut mirrors.
- on the eastern side there are a reception hall, some smaller rooms, big verandas and some covered vestibules and service parts.

Interior parts are on the eastern side of the main yard. There are some halls and offices in this part.

Stables and the living places of servants are in the southern parts of the house.

The house is open for visitors every day from 8:30 to 14:15, except on Fridays and public holidays.

At present, the office of Cultural Heritage, Handcrafts and Tourism Organization is located in this house.

== Gallery ==
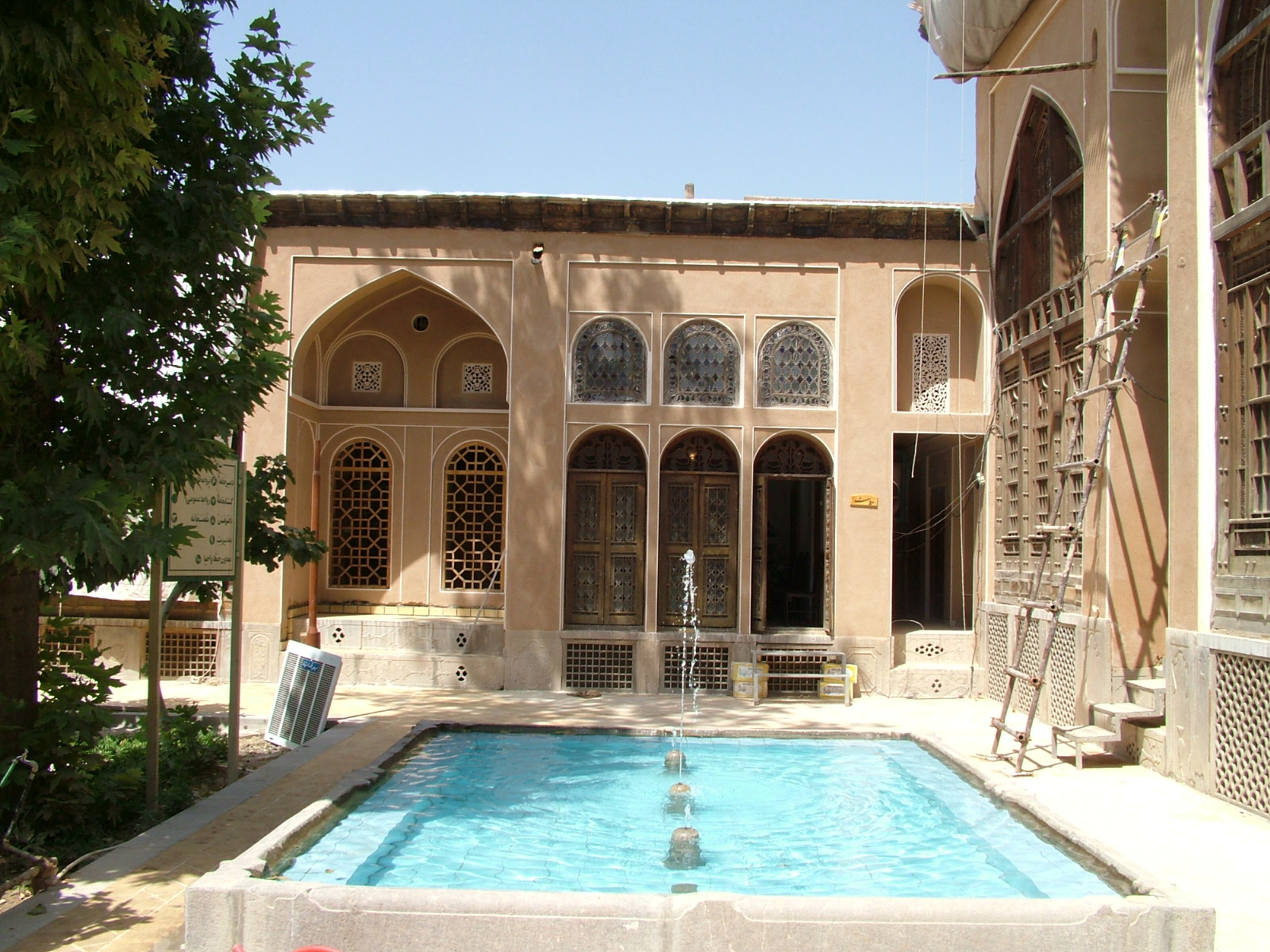

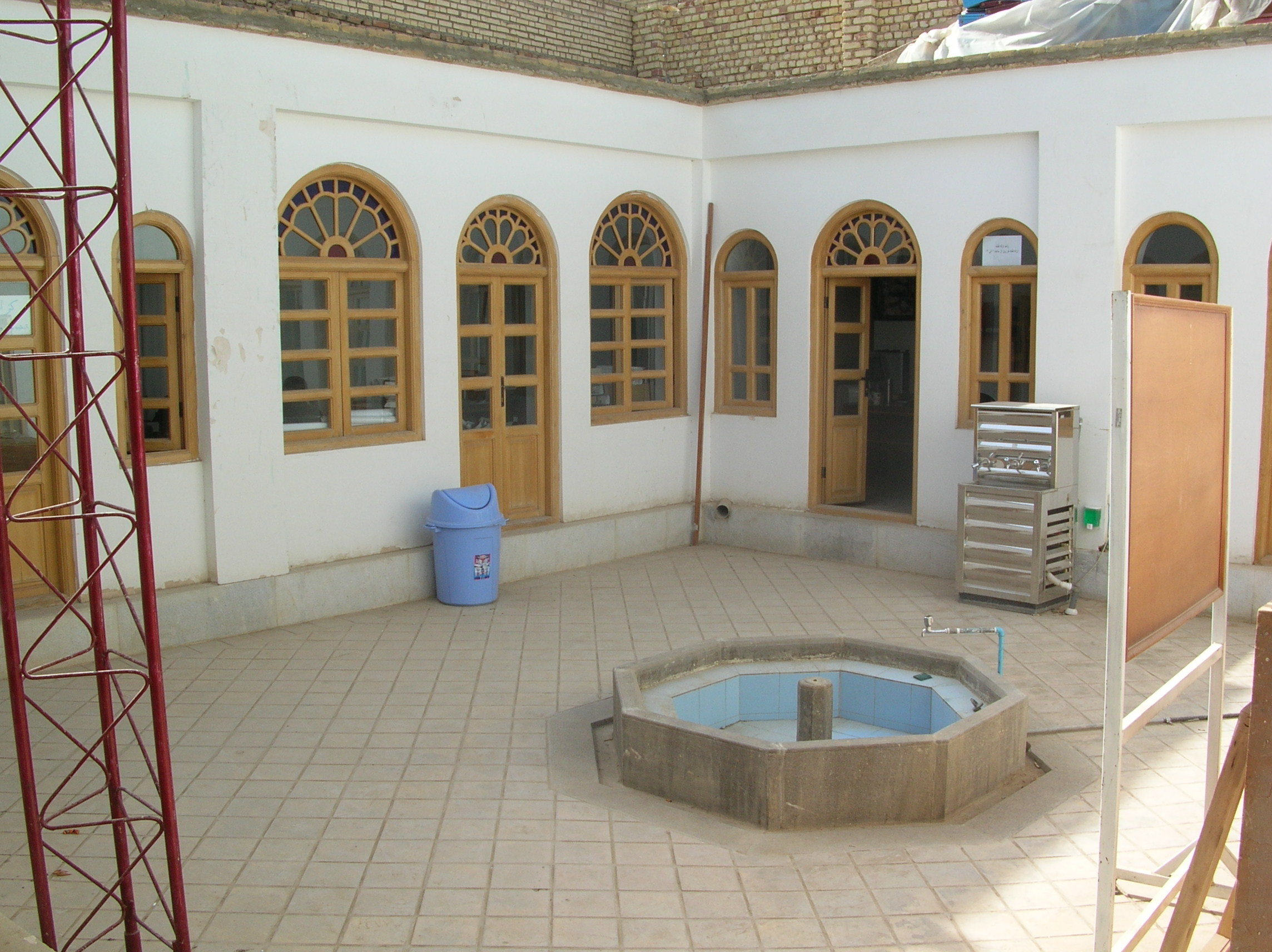

== See also ==
- List of historical structures in Isfahan province
