= Darozziafe minarets =

Dar oz-Ziafeh Minarets مناره های دارالضیافه
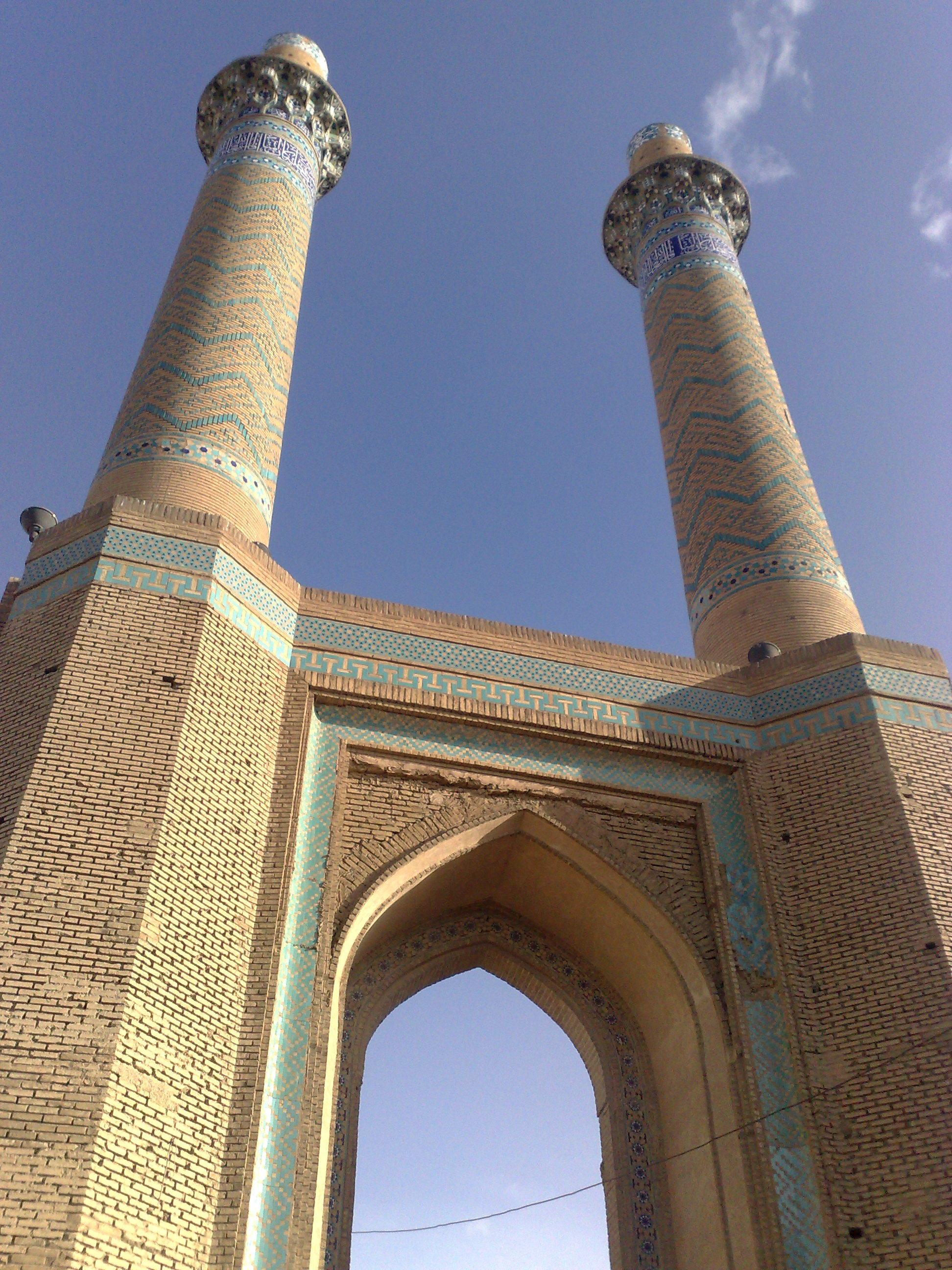

- Location within Iran

Religion
- Affiliation: Islam
- Province: Isfahan

Location
- Location: Jouybareh district, Isfahan, Iran
- Municipality: Isfahan
- Coordinates: 32.668794°N 51.693125°E

Architecture
- Type: Minaret
- Style: Azari
- Designated as NHL

Iran National Heritage List
- Official name: Dar oz-Ziafeh Minarets
- Type: Minaret
- Designated: 1937
- Reference no.: 272
- Conservation organization: Cultural Heritage, Handicrafts and Tourism Organization of Iran

Darozziafe minarets (Persian: مناره های دارالضیافه) are two historical minarets in Isfahan, Iran. The minarets are located in the old Jouybareh district on the Ebn-e-Sina street. These 14th century minarets are built on both sides of a portal. There is an inscription with white script on the ultramarine background under the above muqarnas. Only three Arabic words و من دخله have been remained, which mean someone, who enters.

== See also ==
- List of the historical structures in the Isfahan province
