= Seven Towers of Kharun =

- هفت برج خارون
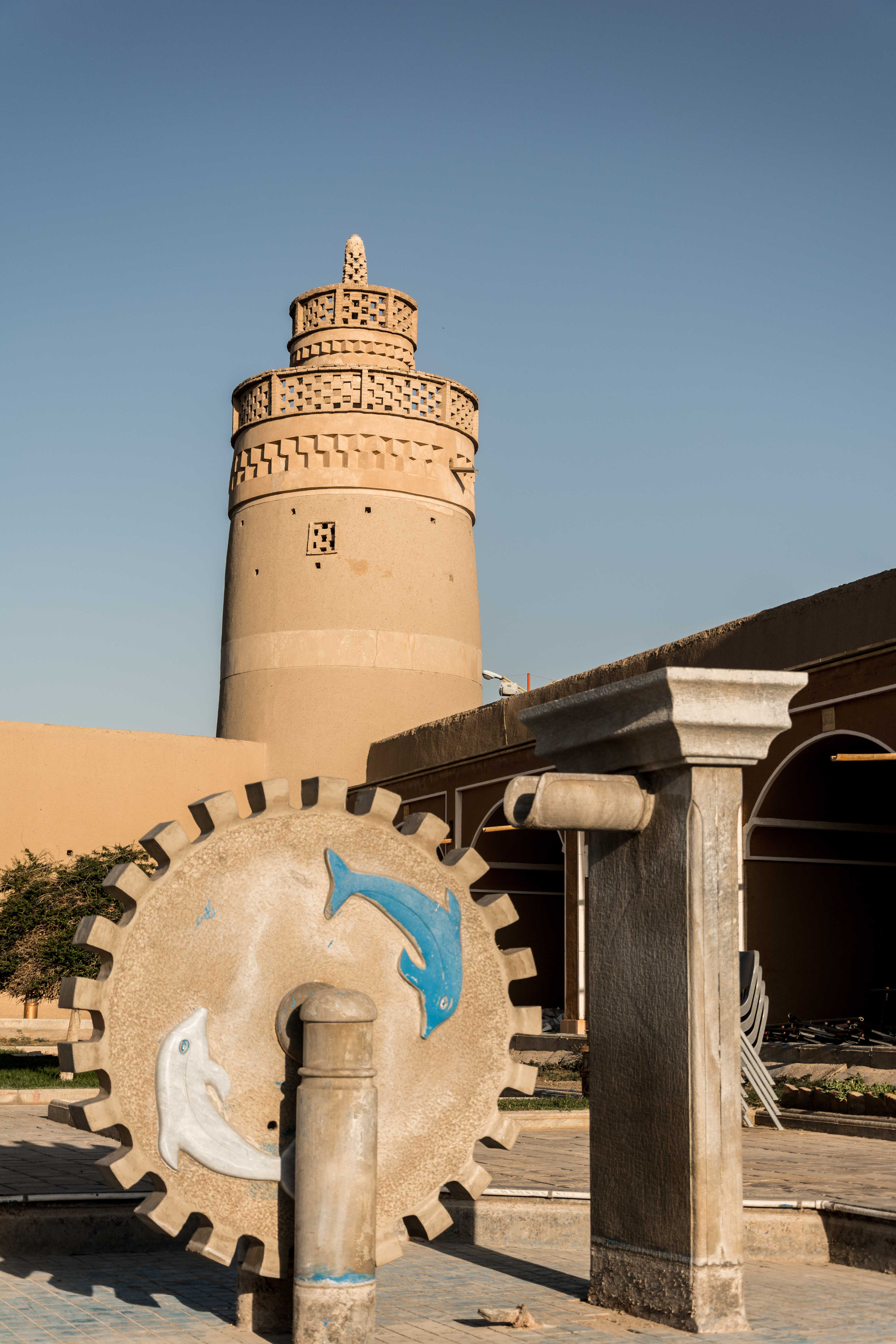

- Location within Iran
- Alternative names: Shaykh Bahāʾī citadelle

General information
- Status: Cultural
- Type: Dovecote
- Architectural style: Isfahani
- Location: Najafabad, Iran
- Coordinates: 32.6213°N 51.3569°E

Height
- Height: 14 m (46 ft)

The Seven towers of Kharoun are located in the south-east of Najafabad in the Isfahan province, Iran. They are the largest recreational center in the west of the Isfahan province.

== Characteristics ==
The seven towers of Kharoun are surrounded by a garden with an area of 3000 m². Six of the seven towers are dovecotes. The towers are 14 m in height and are connected with each other by a cob wall with the height of 4 m. After the conversion of towers to a recreational center, some facilities have been added to them. These facilities and equipments include a fountain, a traditional coffeehouse an entertainment area, a space for cultural activities and a park.

The seven towers of Kharoun have been built in the safavid era for providing manure and for agricultural purposes.

They have been repaired in 2003 by the local government of Najafabad.

== See also ==
- List of the historical structures in the Isfahan province
