= Emamzadeh Mir Neshaneh =

Islamic burial site

- Location within Iran

Religion
- Affiliation: Shia Islam
- Province: Isfahan

Location
- Location: Kashan, Iran
- Municipality: Kashan
- Coordinates: 33.982374°N 51.451367°E

Architecture
- Type: Imamzadeh
- Style: Isfahani
- Dome: 1

Emamzadeh Mir Neshaneh is the burial place of Hassan ibn-e Musa al-Kadhim, the Musa al-Kadhim's son. The emamzadeh has a conical turquoise dome. Its inner walls are decorated with tile mosaic. On the grave, there is a carved sepulcher, on the inscriptions of which it is written some verses of Koran. The wooden door of emamzadeh belongs to the 16th century. Beside the sepulcher, there is a basement, which is called Ghadamgah (footprint). In the basement, there is a water well. The walls and ceiling of the basement are decorated with colorful paintings. On the small door of the basement it is written the name Ganjali, which seems to be the bestower's name of the construction. The emamzadeh has also a mosque of the same name.

== See also ==
- List of the historical structures in the Isfahan province
