= Rahim Khan Mosque =

Shia mosque in Isfahan, Iran

- مسجد رحیم خان
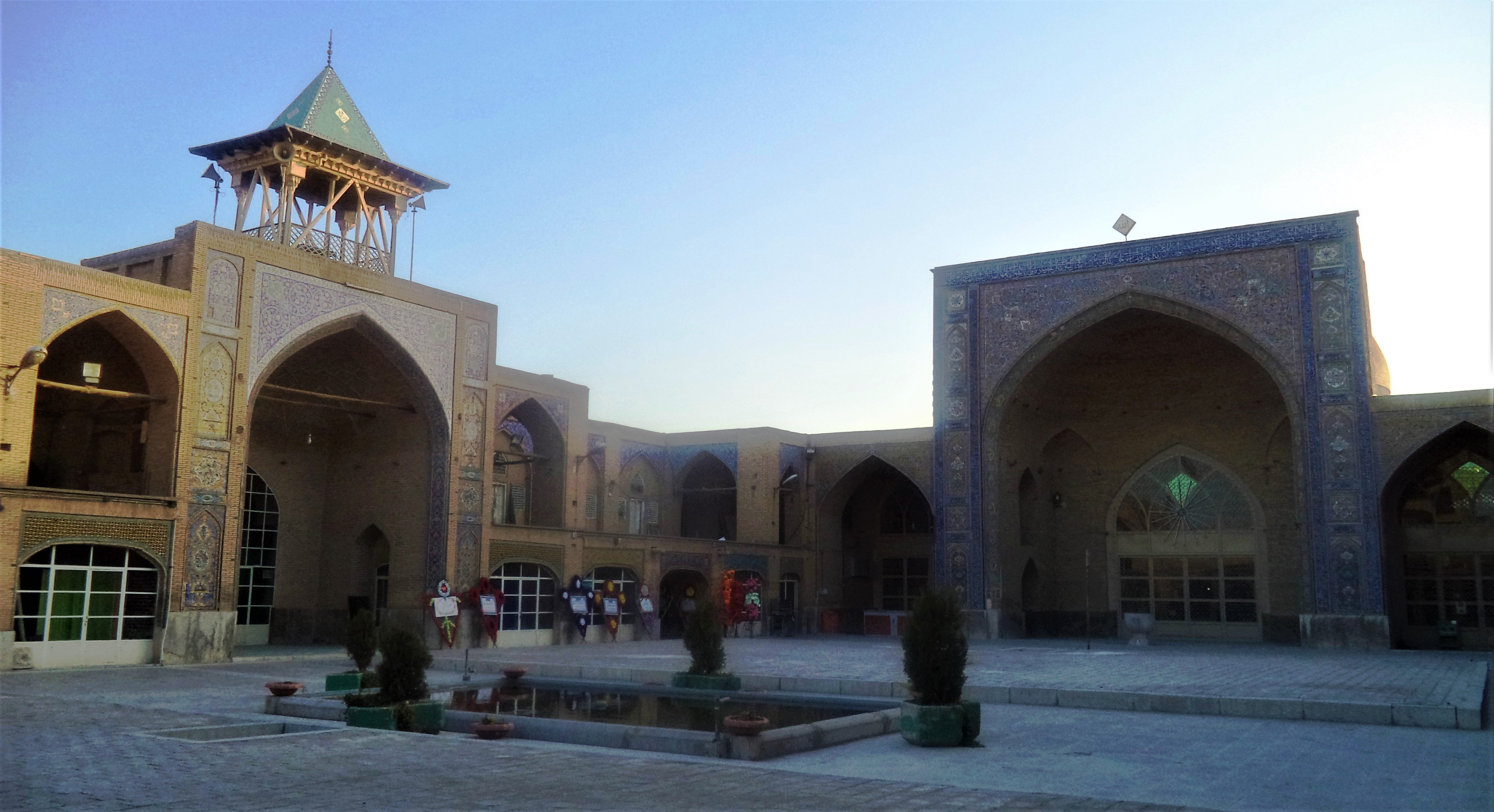
- The mosque in 2016

- Location of the mosque in Iran

Religion
- Affiliation: Shia Islam
- Ecclesiastical or organizational status: Mosque
- Status: Active

Location
- Location: Esfahan, Isfahan Province
- Country: Iran
- Interactive map of Rahim Khan Mosque
- Coordinates: 32°39′33″N 51°39′46″E

Architecture
- Type: Mosque architecture
- Style: Qajar
- Completed: 1873 (west); 1877 (iwan, south); 1878 (entrance, east); 1884 (entrance, east); 1887 (mihrab, iwan, south); 1959 (façade, north)

Specifications
- Dome: One
- Materials: Brick; mortar; tiles

Iran National Heritage List
- Official name: Rahim Khan Mosque
- Type: Built
- Designated: 4 October 1998
- Reference no.: 2124
- Conservation organization: Cultural Heritage, Handicrafts and Tourism Organization of Iran

The Rahim Khan Mosque (Persian: مسجد رحیم خان; Arabic: مسجد رحيم خان) is a Shi'ite mosque, located in Esfahan, in the province of Isfahan, Iran. Completed between 1873 and 1887, with further additions in 1959, the mosque has an unusual combination of styles in architectural decorations. The shabestan of this mosque is one of the biggest shabestans in Isfahan. The shabestan, portal, iwan and outer surface of the mosque's dome have been rebuilt.

The mosque was added to the Iran National Heritage List on 4 October 1998, administered by the Cultural Heritage, Handicrafts and Tourism Organization of Iran.

== See also ==
- Shia Islam in Iran
- List of mosques in Iran
- List of historical structures in Isfahan
