= Jameh Mosque of Meymeh =

Mosque in Meymeh, Isfahan, Iran

Jāmeh Mosque of Meymeh
- مسجد جامع میمه
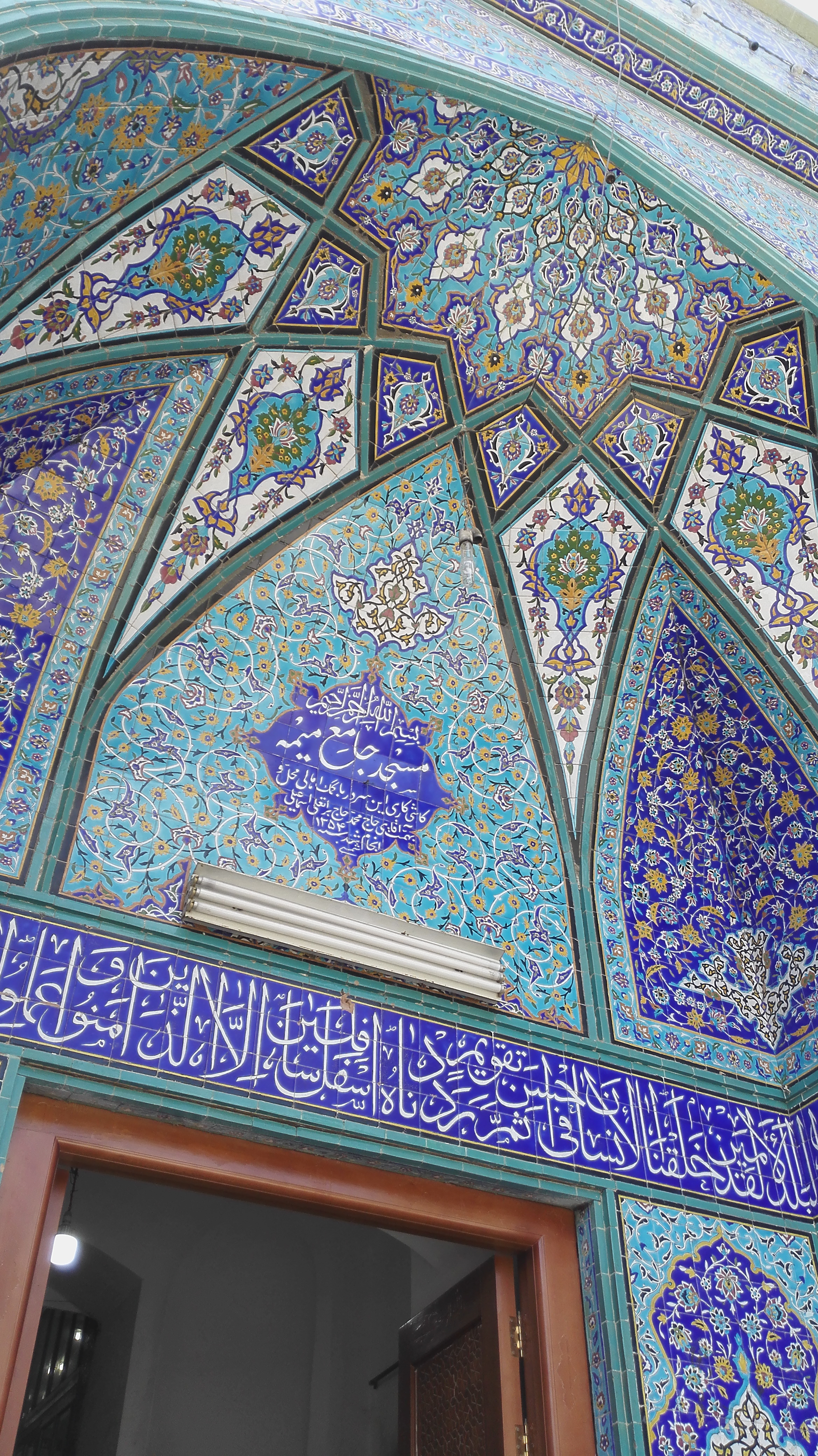
- The mosque iwan in 2017

- Location of the mosque in Iran

Religion
- Affiliation: Shia Islam
- Ecclesiastical or organizational status: Friday mosque
- Status: Active

Location
- Location: Meymeh, Isfahan province
- Country: Iran
- Interactive map of Jāmeh Mosque of Meymeh
- Coordinates: 33°26′38″N 51°09′59″E

Architecture
- Type: Mosque architecture
- Style: Isfahani / Safavid

Iran National Heritage List
- Official name: Jāmeh Mosque of Meymeh
- Type: Built
- Designated: 5 November 1972
- Reference no.: 934
- Conservation organization: Cultural Heritage, Handicrafts and Tourism Organization of Iran

The Jāmeh Mosque of Meymeh (Persian: مسجد جامع میمه; Arabic: جامع ميمة) is a Shi'ite Friday mosque (jāmeh), located in Meymeh, in the province of Isfahan, Iran.

The mosque was built during the Safavid era, and was added to the Iran National Heritage List on 5 November 1972, administered by the Cultural Heritage, Handicrafts and Tourism Organization of Iran.

== Gallery ==
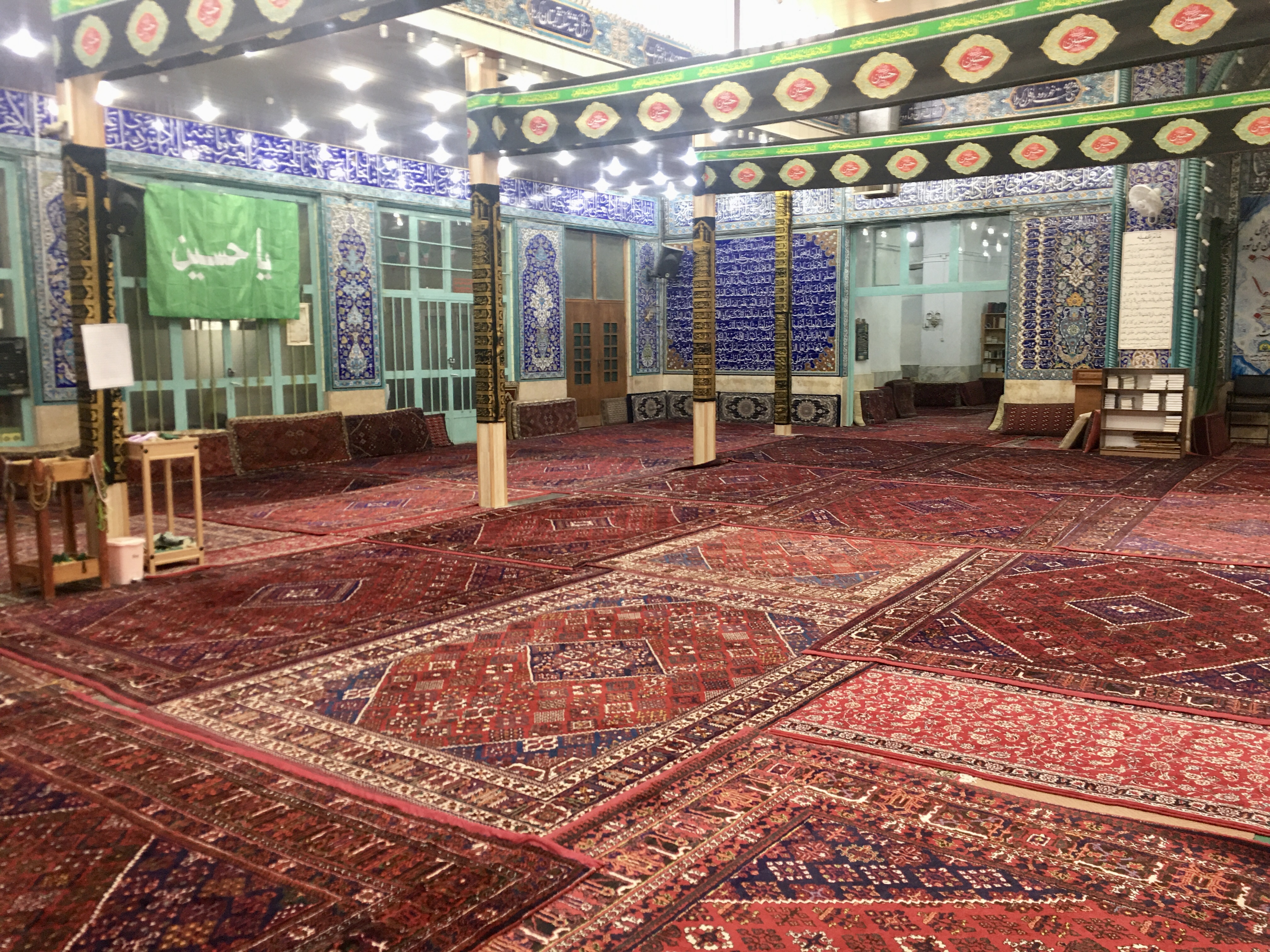
Interior of the mosque prayer hall

== See also ==
- Shia Islam in Iran
- List of mosques in Iran
- List of historical structures in Isfahan province
