= Emamzadeh Shah Yalan =

- Location within Iran

Religion
- Affiliation: Shia Islam
- Province: Isfahan

Location
- Location: Kashan, Iran
- Municipality: Kashan
- Coordinates: 33.983164°N 51.446784°E

Architecture
- Type: Imamzadeh
- Completed: 1498

Emamzadeh Shah Yalan is a historical structure in Kashan, Iran. It dates back to 1498. It is located in the bazaar of Kashan. On the carved wooden chest on the tomb, the date 951 of the Islamic calendar (1544 in the Gregorian calendar) has been written.

== See also ==
- List of the historical structures in the Isfahan province
