= Shah Ali hammam =

Historic bathhouse in Isfahan, Iran

- حمام شاه علی
- Location within Iran

General information
- Status: Cultural
- Type: Hammam
- Architectural style: Isfahani
- Location: Isfahan, Iran
- Coordinates: 32.6682°N 51.6651°E

Technical details
- Floor area: 1200 m

The Shah Ali hammam is a hammam in Isfahan, Iran. The hammam belongs to the Safavid era.

== See also ==
- List of historical structures in Isfahan province
