= Emamzadeh Taher and Mansour =

- Location within Iran

Religion
- Affiliation: Shia Islam
- Province: Isfahan

Location
- Location: Kashan, Iran
- Municipality: Kashan
- Coordinates: 33.986598°N 51.457491°E

Architecture
- Type: Imamzadeh
- Completed: 1536

Emamzadeh Taher and Mansour is a historical structure in Kashan, Iran. The construction of the building was completed in 1536, which is mentioned on the door of the tomb under the name of twelve shiites Imams. The Emamzadeh has a turquoise dome and minaret and also a wooden shrine.

== See also ==
- List of the historical structures in the Isfahan province
