= Darvazeh No Mosque =

Mosque in Isfahan, Iran

- مسجد دروازه نو
- Location of the mosque in Iran

Religion
- Affiliation: Shia Islam
- Ecclesiastical or organisational status: Mosque
- Status: Active

Location
- Location: Sonbolestan St, Esfahan, Isfahan Province
- Country: Iran
- Coordinates: 32°40′5″N 51°40′28″E

Architecture
- Type: Mosque architecture
- Style: Qajar

Iran National Heritage List
- Official name: Darvazeh No Mosque
- Type: Built
- Designated: 2 August 1997
- Reference no.: 1905
- Conservation organization: Cultural Heritage, Handicrafts and Tourism Organization of Iran

The Darvazeh No Mosque (Persian: مسجد دروازه نو) is a Shi'ite mosque, located in Esfahan in the province of Isfahan, Iran.

Completed in the Qajar era, the mosque was added to the Iran National Heritage List on 2 August 1997, administered by the Cultural Heritage, Handicrafts and Tourism Organization of Iran.

== See also ==
- Shia Islam in Iran
- List of mosques in Iran
- List of historical structures in Isfahan
