= Emamzadeh Panje Shah =

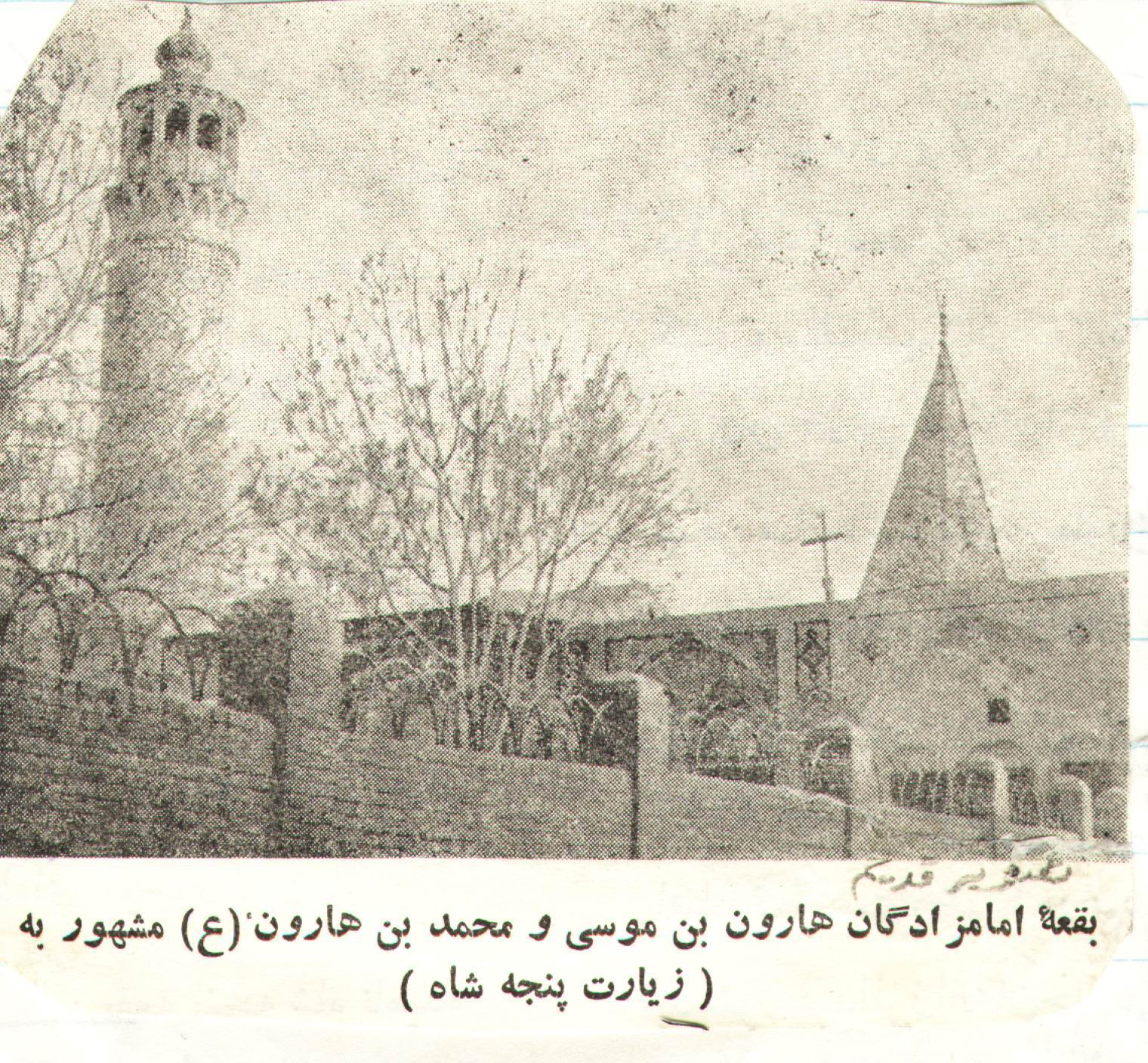

- Location within Iran

Religion
- Affiliation: Shia Islam
- Province: Isfahan

Location
- Location: Kashan, Iran
- Municipality: Kashan
- Coordinates: 33.985038°N 51.444897°E

Architecture
- Type: Imamzadeh

The Emamzadeh Panje Shah is an imamzadeh in Kashan, Iran. The imamzadeh has been a sacred place since the early islamic centuries. It was also in the past one of the safest sanctuary places and if a criminal had taken sanctuary in the imamzadeh, nobody dared to take him out by force. The Emamzadeh Panje Shah belongs to the Seljuq era, but its internal decorations belong mostly to the Qajar era. this structure is apparently the buried place of one of the Musa al-Kadhim's son. It has a conical dome, a yard, an iwan, several porticoes and a big wooden sepulcher.

There is a minaret beside the northern portal of the yard. The entrance of the tomb has an marbly inscription. On the inscription, it has been written an ode for praising the buried Imamzadeh. There are also other old graves in the structure. Two of them are on the both sides of the portico. It is said that one of the graves belongs to the Malik al-Ashtar's daughter, Safieh Khatun.

== See also ==
- List of the historical structures in the Isfahan province
