= Ilchi Mosque =

Shi'ite mosque in Isfahan, Iran

- مسجد ایلچی
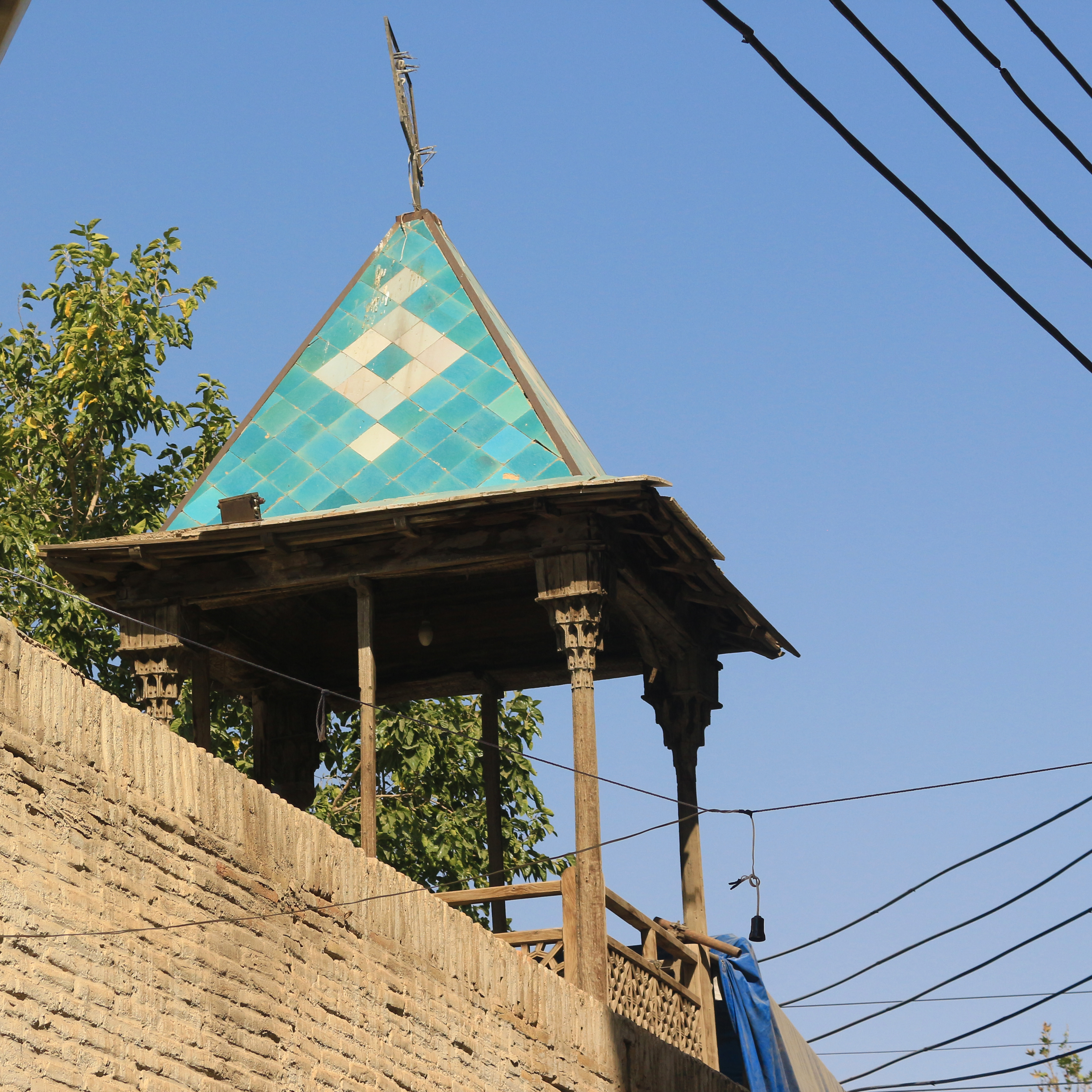
- The mosque turret spire

- Location of the mosque in Iran

Religion
- Affiliation: Shia Islam
- Ecclesiastical or organisational status: Mosque
- Status: Active

Location
- Location: Esfahan, Isfahan Province
- Country: Iran
- Coordinates: 32°39′44″N 51°41′37″E

Architecture
- Architect: Mohammad Ali ben Ostad ALibeyk
- Type: Mosque architecture
- Style: Isfahani / Safavid
- Founder: Saheb Soltan Beigom
- Completed: 1686 CE

Specifications
- Spire: One (turret)
- Materials: Bricks; mortar; tiles

Iran National Heritage List
- Official name: Ilchi Mosque
- Type: Mosque
- Designated: 1937
- Reference no.: 271
- Conservation organization: Cultural Heritage, Handicrafts and Tourism Organization of Iran

The Ilchi Mosque (Persian: مسجد ایلچی; Arabic: مسجد إيلجي) is a Shi'ite mosque in Esfahan, in the province of Isfahan, Iran. The founder of this small and simple mosque was Saheb Soltan Beigom, the daughter of a courtier in Shah Suleiman's court. In Azeri, the word Ilchi (elçi) means messenger. The mosque was built in 1686 CE under the supervision of Mohammad Ali ben Ostad ALibeyk.

The mosque was added to the Iran National Heritage List on 3 March 1937, administered by the Cultural Heritage, Handicrafts and Tourism Organization of Iran.

== See also ==
- Shia Islam in Iran
- List of mosques in Iran
- List of historical structures in Isfahan
