= Zeyn od-Din minaret =

Historic minaret in Kashan, Iran

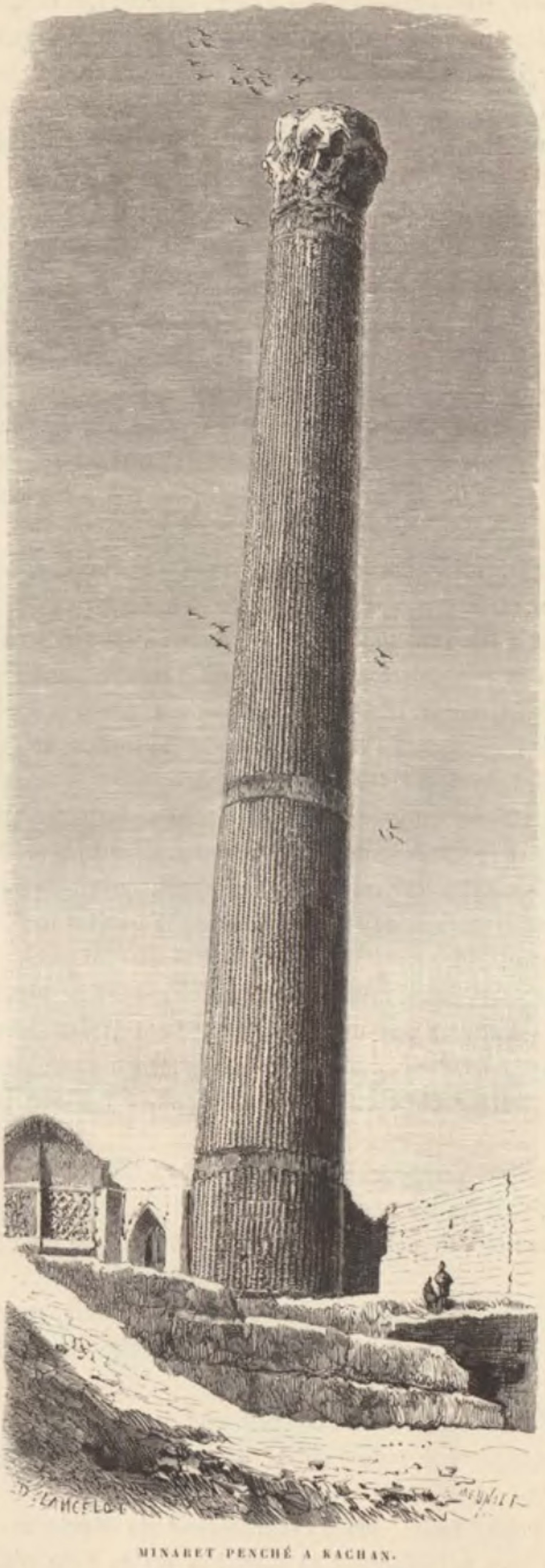
- مناره زین‌الدین

- Location within Iran

Religion
- Province: Isfahan

Location
- Location: Kashan, Iran
- Municipality: Kashan
- Coordinates: 33.977746°N 51.448103°E

Architecture
- Type: Minaret
- Style: Azari
- Iran National Heritage List
- Official name: Zeyneddin Minaret
- Type: Minaret
- Designated: 1932
- Reference no.: 118
- Conservation organization: Cultural Heritage, Handicrafts and Tourism Organization of Iran

The Zeyn od-Din minaret (Persian: مناره زین الدین) is a historic minaret in Kashan, Iran. The founder of the minaret, Khaje Zeyn od-Din, was one of the dignitaries of the Timurid era in the 15th century. He also built a khanqah beside the minaret. It seems that minaret was originally 47 m high, but more than half of it was destroyed in 1931 by the decision of the governor and mayor of Kashan. Strong earthquakes during the centuries made the minaret lean.

== See also ==
- List of the historical structures in the Isfahan province
