= Shaykh Bahai hammam =

Historic bathhouse in Isfahan, Iran

Sheikh Bahai's Bathhouse
- حمام شیخ بهایی
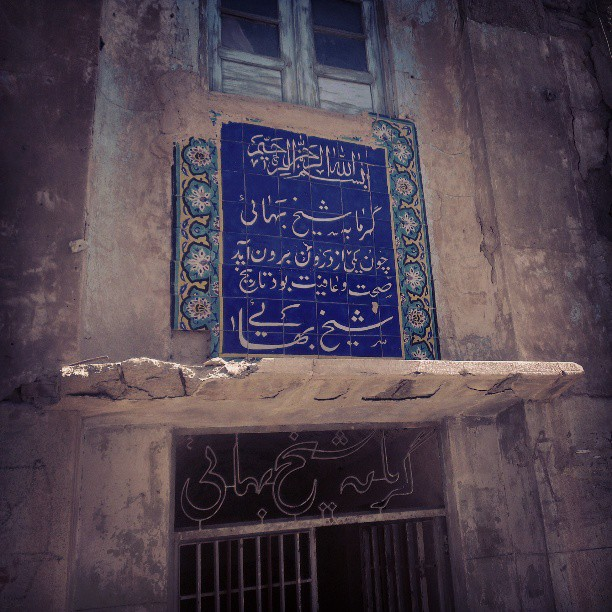

- Location within Iran
- Alternative names: Sheikh Bahai's Hamam

General information
- Status: Cultural
- Type: hammam
- Architectural style: Isfahani
- Location: Isfahan, Iran
- Coordinates: 32.654826°N 51.657738°E

The Sheikh Bahai's Bathhouse is a Bathhouse (hammam) in Isfahan, Iran. The hammam belongs to the Safavid era. It was built in the year 1616 CE. It is located in the Shaykh Bahai alley in the Abd or-Razagh street. The bathhouse was operating with one single candle.

== Fuel of Garmkhaneh (hothouse) ==
The most realistic theory about the fuel of the Garmkhaneh is that there was an underground ceramic piping system between the public toilet of the Jameh mosque and the hammam and probably gases like methane and sulfur oxides led to the torch of heated pool by the natural suction method and methane and sulfur oxides burned directly as the heating source in torch, or these gases were used from the wastes of hammam. According to old residents in the neighborhood, there was a marsh behind the Garmkhaneh and wastewater flew in the marsh and needed gas was obtained from this marsh.

Until 20 years ago, Shaykh Bahai hammam was used as a hammam. Then it was closed and after 10 years it came in the possession of the Cultural Heritage, Handcrafts and Tourism Organization. Since 2007, the Garmkhaneh of the hammam has been being repaired by this organization.

== See also ==
- List of historical structures in Isfahan province
