= Amin's House =

Historic house in Isfahan, Iran

- خانه امین
- Location within Iran

General information
- Type: house
- Location: Isfahan, Iran, Iran
- Coordinates: 32.6661°N 51.6710°E

The Amin's house is a Qajar era historic house in Isfahan, Iran. It features stucco decorations, ayeneh-kari, and marquetry doors.

== See also ==
- List of the historical structures in the Isfahan province
