= Jarchi hammam =

Historic site in Isfahan, Iran

- حمام جارچی
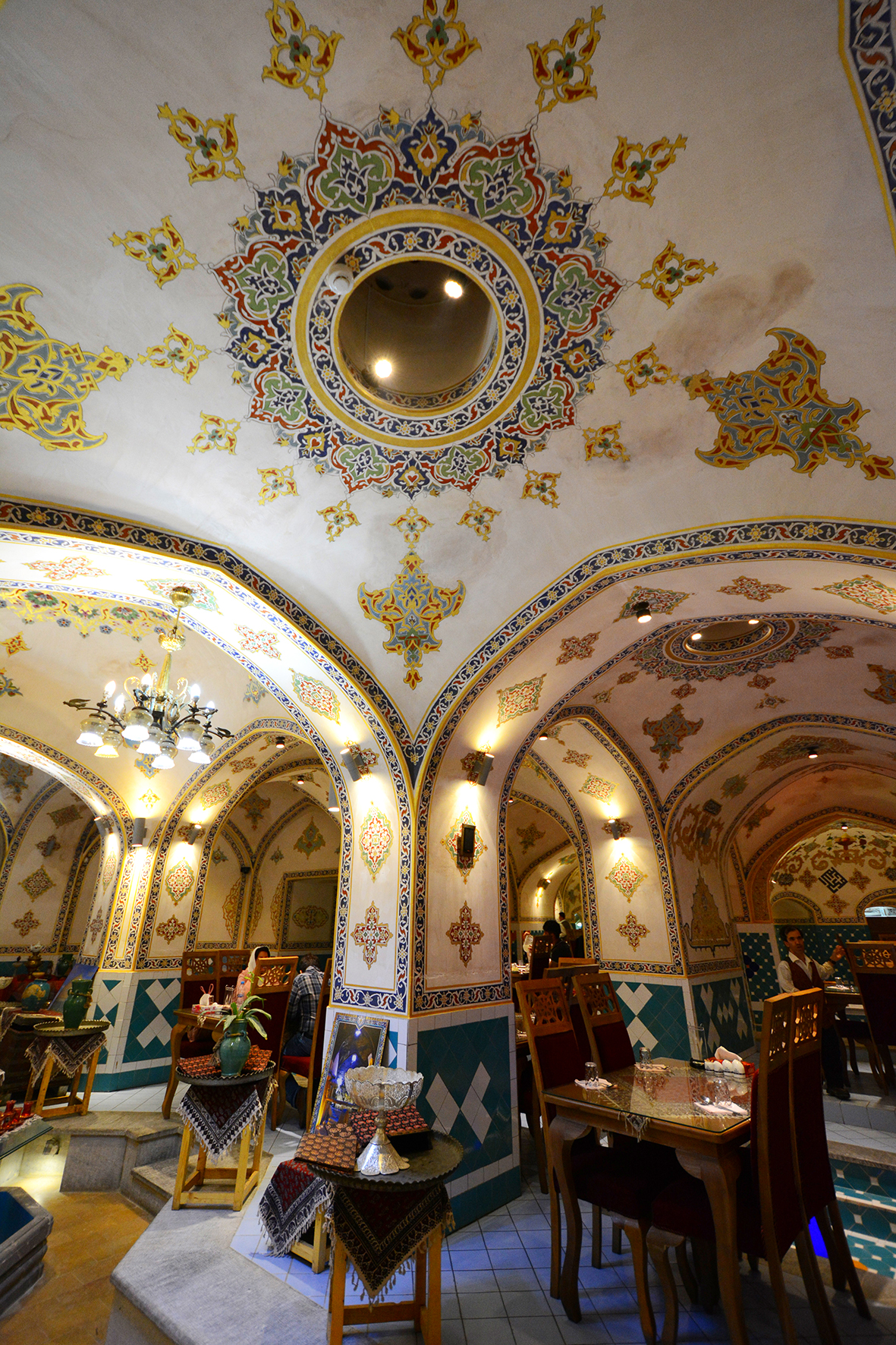
- Jarchi hammam in 2015

- Location within Iran
- Alternative names: Jarchibashi hammam

General information
- Status: Cultural
- Type: hammam
- Architectural style: Isfahani
- Location: Isfahan, Iran
- Coordinates: 32.6636°N 51.6751°E

Technical details
- Floor area: 1640 sq m

The Jarchi hammam (Persian: حمام جارچی) or Jarchibashi hammam (Persian: حمام جارچی‌باشی) is a historic structure in Isfahan, Iran. The hammam belongs to the Safavid era. It is located in the Hakim street.

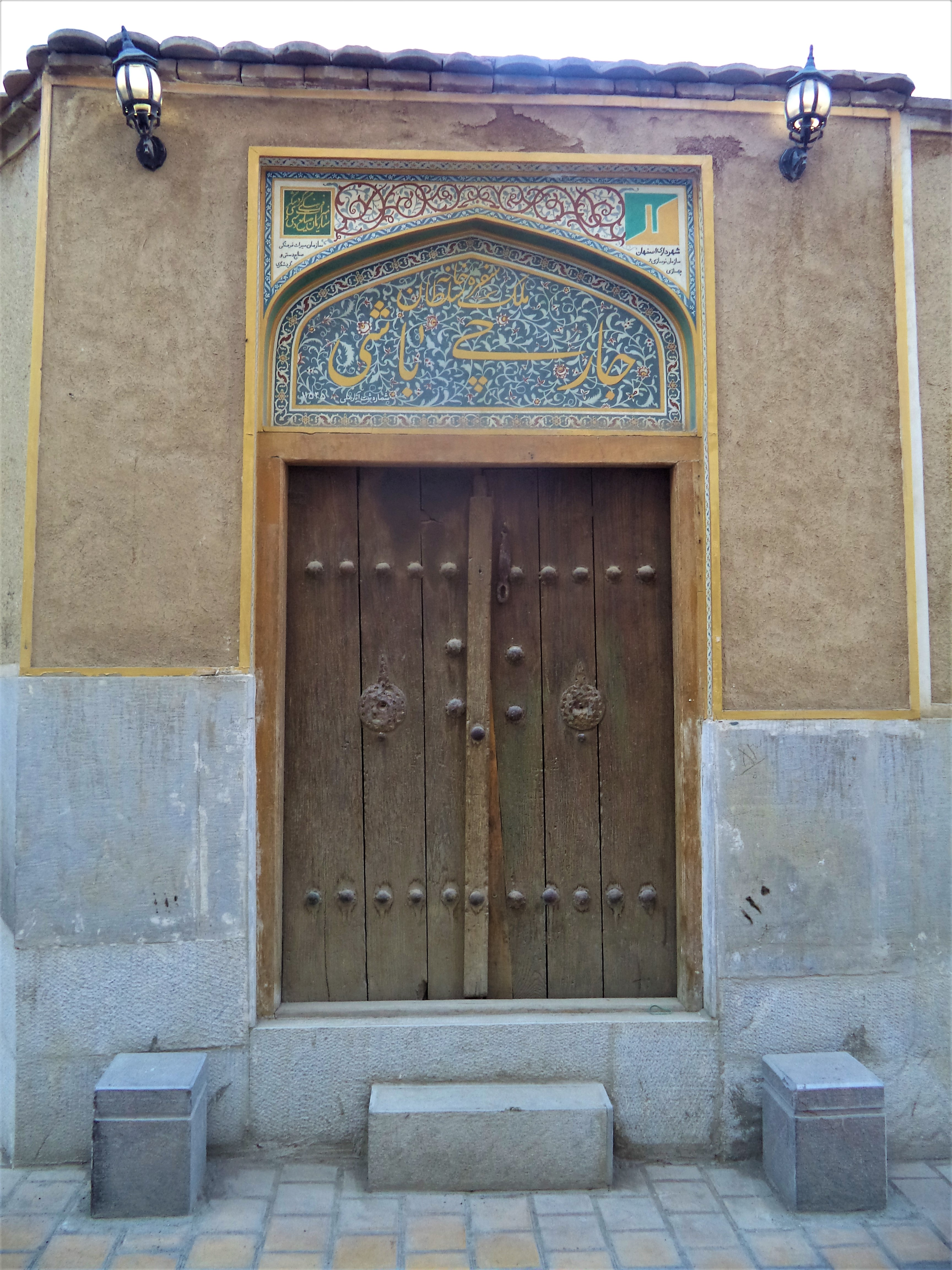
The entrance to the bathhouse, 2015

== See also ==
- List of the historical structures in the Isfahan province
