= Alam's House =

Historic house in Isfahan, Iran

- خانه اعلم
- Location within Iran

General information
- Status: Cultural
- Type: house
- Location: Isfahan, Iran
- Coordinates: 32.6664°N 51.6748°E

Technical details
- Floor area: 1,118 m²

The Alam's house is a historic house in Isfahan, Iran. The owner of the house was a Qajar aristocrat.

The house has a central courtyard, surrounded from every side by residential rooms. The northern part is distinguished by a columned veranda and has a reception hall. There are two rooms on the two sides of the reception hall. In this hall, there are stucco and ayeneh-kari decorations. The hall faces the veranda by seven sash windows and leads to the rooms by khatamkari doors. The southern part of the house is a narrow and long dining room, which has painted windows. The eastern and western sides have identical plans. Both of them have reception halls, which lead to smaller rooms. All parts of the house have been decorated by brickwork, tiles, stucco and gilding. The courtyard features a stone howz.

== See also ==
- List of the historical structures in the Isfahan province
