= Dashti Mosque =

Mosque in Isfahan, Iran

- مسجد دشتی
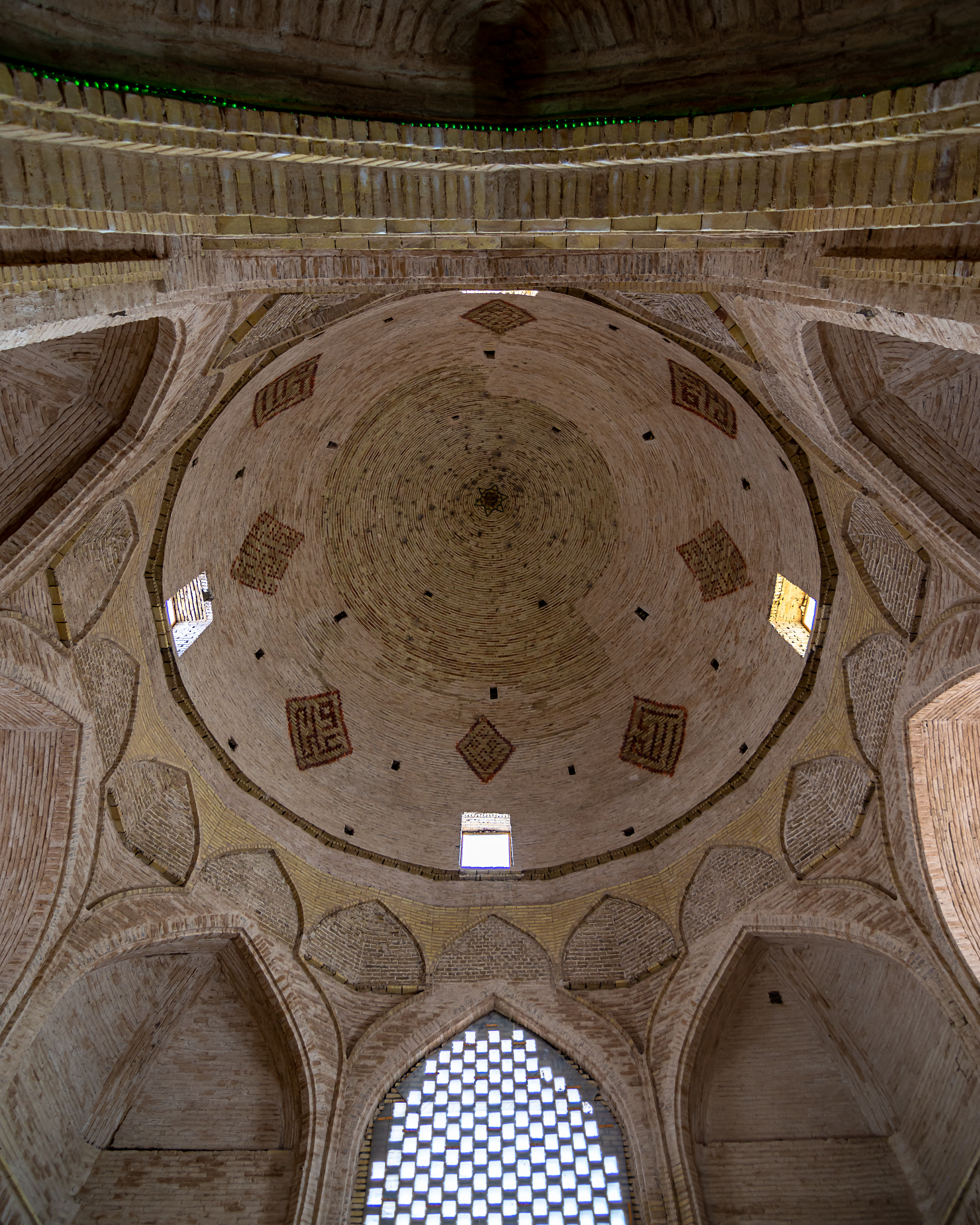
- Interior of the mosque's dome

- Location of the mosque in Iran

Religion
- Affiliation: Shia Islam
- Ecclesiastical or organisational status: Mosque
- Status: Active

Location
- Location: Dashti village, Esfahan, Isfahan province
- Country: Iran
- Coordinates: 32°31′40″N 51°47′28″E

Architecture
- Type: Mosque architecture
- Style: Azari

Specifications
- Dome: One
- Dome dia. (outer): 9.8 m (32 ft)
- Minarets: Unknown number (since destroyed)

Iran National Heritage List
- Official name: Dashti Mosque
- Type: Mosque
- Designated: 1942
- Reference no.: 347
- Conservation organization: Cultural Heritage, Handicrafts and Tourism Organization of Iran

The Dashti Mosque (Persian: مسجد دشتی; Arabic: مسجد دشتي), also known as the Dashti Dome, is a Shi'ite mosque, located in the Dashti village, approximately 18 kilometres (11 mi) from Esfahan, in the province of Isfahan, Iran.

The mosque was added to the Iran National Heritage List on 10 June 1942, administered by the Cultural Heritage, Handicrafts and Tourism Organization of Iran.

== Overview ==
The mosque is located in southern shore of Zayandeh Rood and its design is similar to Azarin and Ka’aj mosques. The mosque includes a 14-square-metre (150 sq ft) prayer room within a balcony that is 10 metres (33 ft) wide and 5.4 metres (18 ft) deep. The square shaped prayer room has three arched gateway in north, east and west sides and also a bricked mihrab in south side. The base of dome also is square shaped within eight big arches in down part and sixteen windows in up part. There had been some minarets in northern corners of the mosque which were subsequently destroyed.

The mosque is one of the most famous structures of the Ilkhanid era. There is no inscription in or on the mosque, on which the construction year and the architect's name has been mentioned.

== See also ==
- Shia Islam in Iran
- List of mosques in Iran
- List of historical structures in Isfahan province
