= Emam school =

Soltani Madrasah مدرسه سلطانی

- Location within Iran

Religion
- Affiliation: Islam
- Province: Isfahan

Location
- Location: Kashan, Iran
- Municipality: Kashan
- Coordinates: 33.982817°N 51.447567°E

Architecture
- Type: Theological school
- Style: Isfahani
- Designated as NHL

Iran National Heritage List
- Official name: Soltani Religious School
- Type: Religious School
- Designated: 1936
- Reference no.: 251
- Conservation organization: Cultural Heritage, Handicrafts and Tourism Organization of Iran

The Emam school is a historical school in Kashan, Iran. The school belongs to the Fath Ali Shah's era.

The Emam school was built between 1806 and 1814 on the order of Hossein Khan Sadr-e Azam and under the supervision of Mirza Abolghassem Esfahani. The portal of the school has beautiful tiles. Its vast courtyard is rectangular and there are 52 chambers around it. On the northern and southern sides of the courtyard, there are two large halls for teaching and discussing of seminarians. Each hall has a separate corridor, which leads to backyard. Each backyard has three chambers with basement and high windcatchers. On the west side of the yard and opposite the portal, there is a vast splendid iwan. From the inscription on the ceiling of the iwan to its floor, it is decorated with Haft-rang tiles. The brick dome of the mosque is two-layered. The inside layer of the dome is 27 m high.

== See also ==
- List of the historical structures in the Isfahan province
