= Emamzadeh Pir Davoud =

Imamzadeh in Ghamsar, Iran

- امامزاده پیرداوود

Religion
- Affiliation: Shia Islam
- Province: Isfahan

Location
- Location: Ghamsar, Iran
- Municipality: Ghamsar

Architecture
- Type: Imamzadeh
- Style: Isfahani

The Emamzadeh Pir Davoud (Persian: امامزاده پیرداوود) is an Imamzadeh in Ghamsar, Iran. It is said that it is the burial place of Davoud, Ali's grandson. The Imamzadeh is located in a pleasant and verdant spot in the north of Ghamsar adjacent to dense gardens. The structure was built in the Safavid era. The structure has a conical dome, which is decorated by turquoise tiles. The grave of the Imamzadeh is located in a wooden housing.

== See also ==
- List of historical structures in Isfahan Province
