= Safa Mosque, Isfahan =

Shi'ite mosque in Isfahan, Iran

Safa Mosque
- Location of the mosque in Iran

Religion
- Affiliation: Shia Islam
- Ecclesiastical or organizational status: Mosque
- Status: Active

Location
- Location: Esfahan, Isfahan province
- Country: Iran
- Interactive map of Safa Mosque
- Coordinates: 32°40′28″N 51°41′02″E

Architecture
- Type: Mosque architecture
- Style: Isfahani
- Founder: Mohammad Golestaneh
- Completed: 1290 AH (1873/1874 CE)

The Safa Mosque is a Shi'ite mosque, located near the Shahshahan mausoleum, in Esfahan, in the province of Isfahan, Iran. The mosque was built by Mohammad Golestaneh in 1290 AH (1873/1874 CE), during the Qajar era.

According to its inscription in white Thulth font on dark blue tiles, the mosque was built by Sayyed Mohammad Ali Golestaneh in 1290 AH (1873/1874 CE). The calligrapher of this inscription was Mohammad Taghi Ben mohammad Ibrahim.

== See also ==
- Shia Islam in Iran
- List of mosques in Iran
- List of historical structures in Isfahan
