= Museum of Decorative Arts, Isfahan =

Museum in Isfahan

Museum of Decorative Arts
- موزه ی هنرهای تزئینی
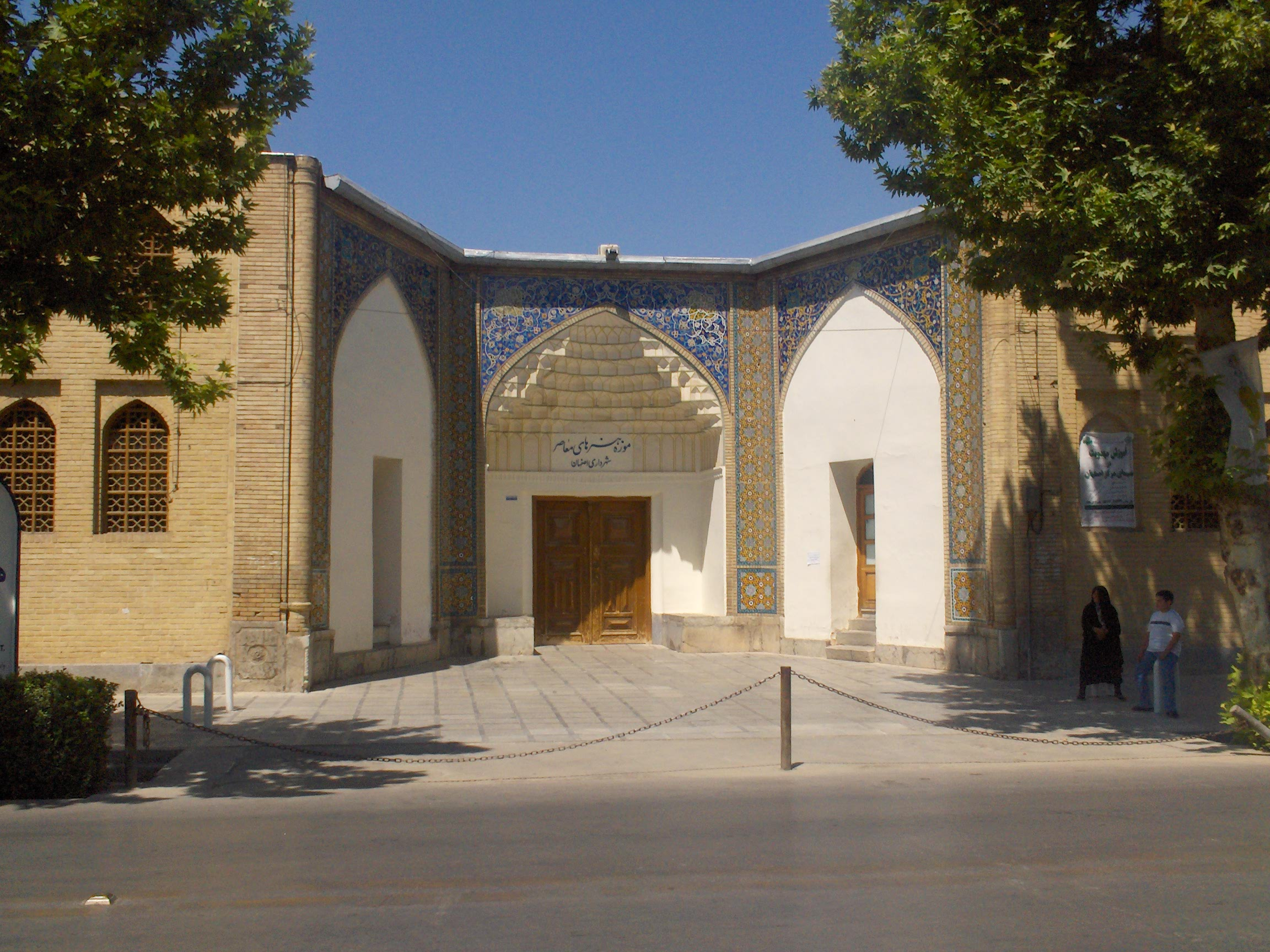

- Location within Iran

General information
- Status: Cultural
- Type: museum
- Architectural style: Isfahani
- Location: Isfahan, Iran
- Coordinates: 32.6580°N 51.6741°E
- Owner: Cultural Heritage, Handcrafts and Tourism Organization

Technical details
- Floor area: 1200 m²

The museum of decorative arts in Isfahan was founded in 1995. More than 3000 artworks from the Safavid and Qajar eras are kept in the museum.

The building of the museum was constructed during the reign of Abbas I as a part of the Charbagh Palace. There is a Qajar era multi-storey tower beside the museum which was originally used as a watchtower and later as a jail. The tower does not have any kind of decorations, but is regarded as a notable relic of Safavid architecture.

== Gallery ==
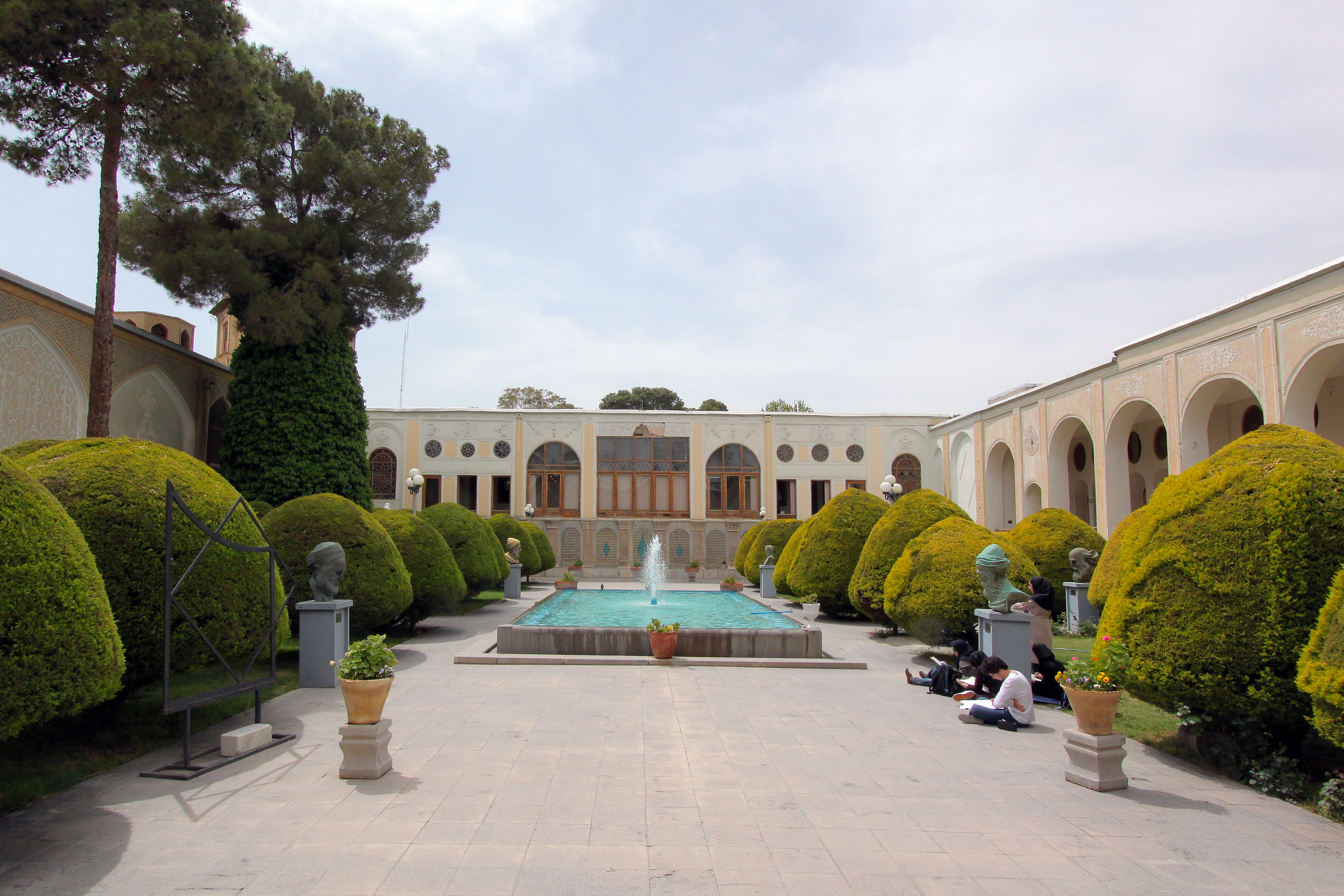

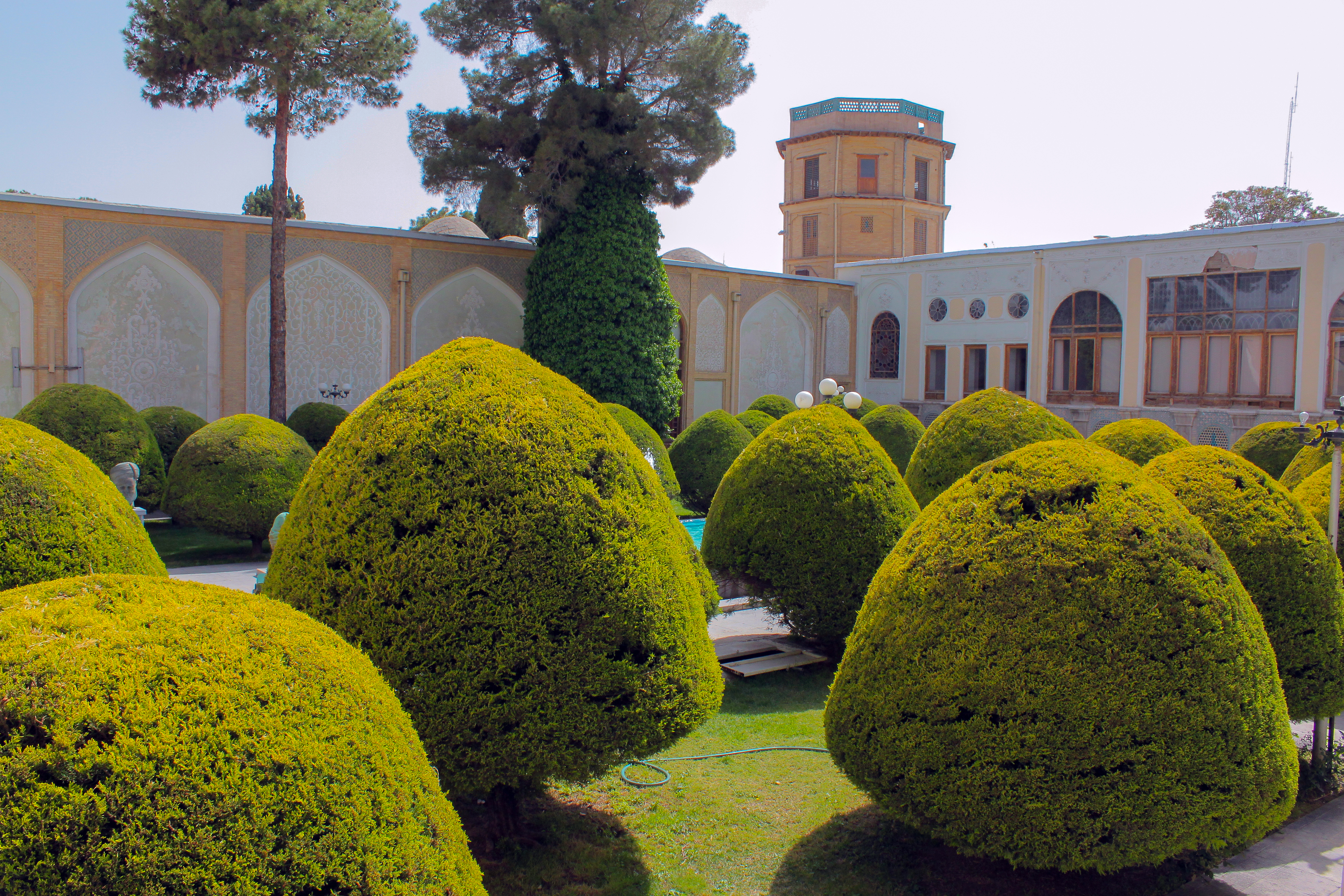

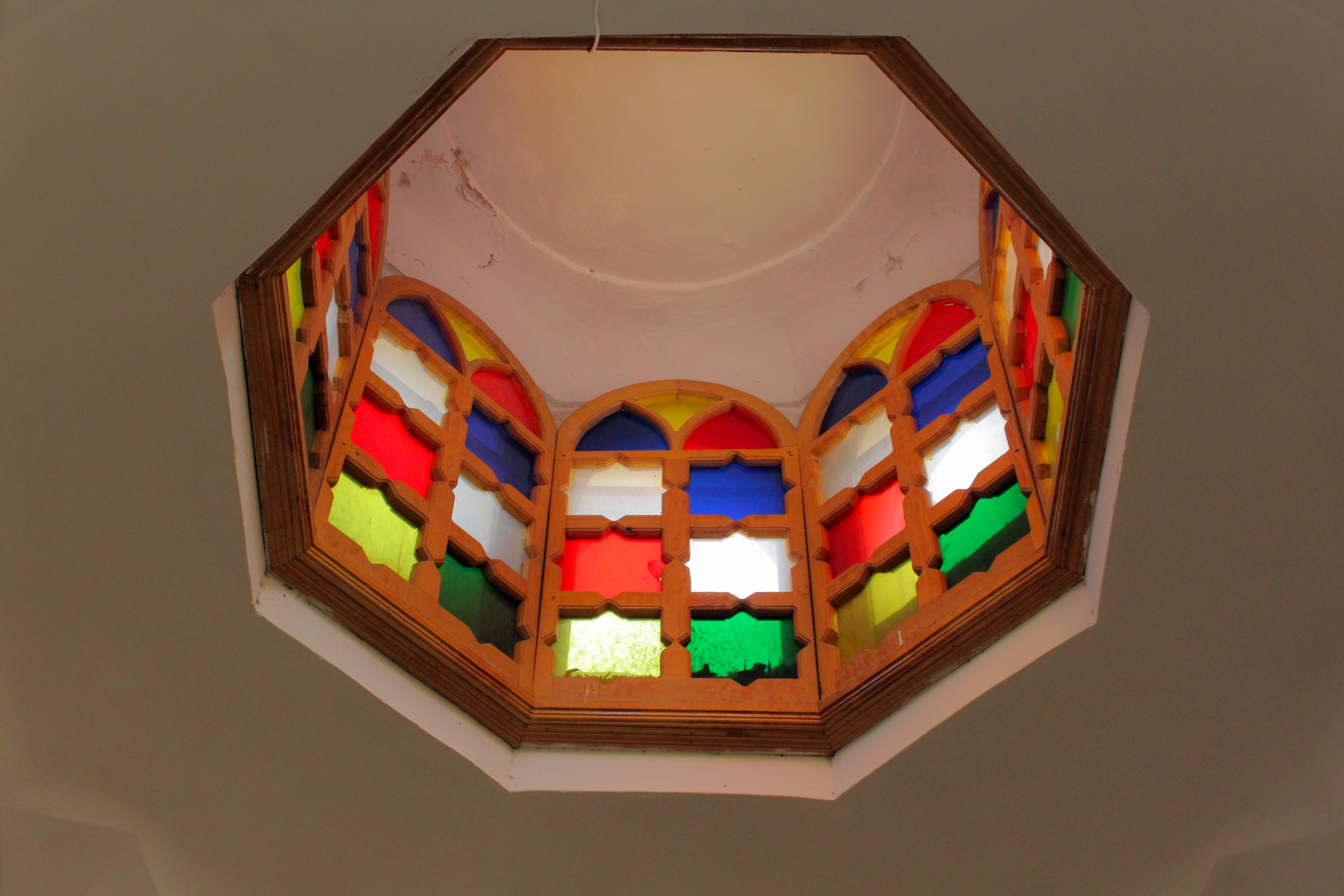
