= Ziyar minaret =

Historic minaret in Iran

Ziyar Minaret مناره زیار
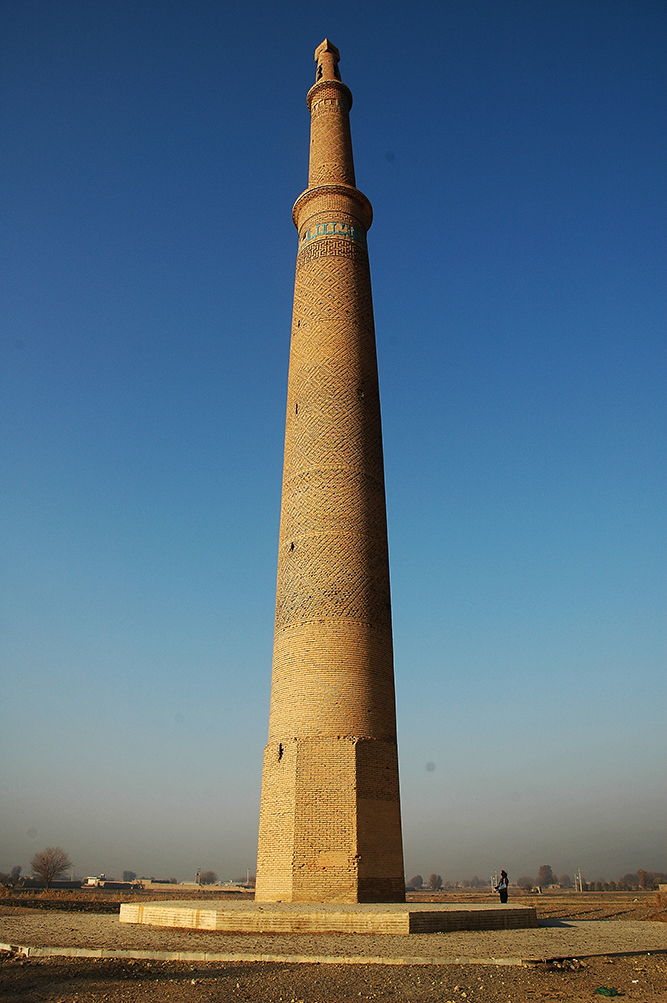

- Location within Iran

Religion
- Affiliation: Islam
- Province: Isfahan

Location
- Location: Ziyar village, Iran
- Coordinates: 32.51285°N 51.957583°E

Architecture
- Type: Minaret
- Style: Razi
- Height (max): 51 m (167 ft)
- Designated as NHL

Iran National Heritage List
- Official name: Ziyar Minaret
- Type: Minaret
- Designated: 1937
- Reference no.: 285
- Conservation organization: Cultural Heritage, Handicrafts and Tourism Organization of Iran

The Ziyar minaret (Persian: مناره زیار) is a historic minaret in Isfahan province, Iran. The minaret is located 33 km to the east of the city of Isfahan near Ziyar on the southern side of Zayanderud. At 51m high, it is the second highest historic minaret in the province after the Sarban minaret. It is also the only three-storey minaret in the province, the height of which has not decreased in the course of time. No construction dates have been mentioned in its kufic inscriptions, but because of its similarity to the minarets of Seljuk era, it is estimated that it was built in the 12th century. The crown of the minaret has turquoise tiles.

The spiral staircase of the minaret still exists and can be mounted. From the third floor, the Barsian mosque and minaret can be seen.

== See also ==
- List of the historical structures in the Isfahan province
