= Mohammad Jafar Abadei Mosque =

Shi'ite mosque in Isfahan, Iran

- مسجد محمد جعفر آباده‌ای
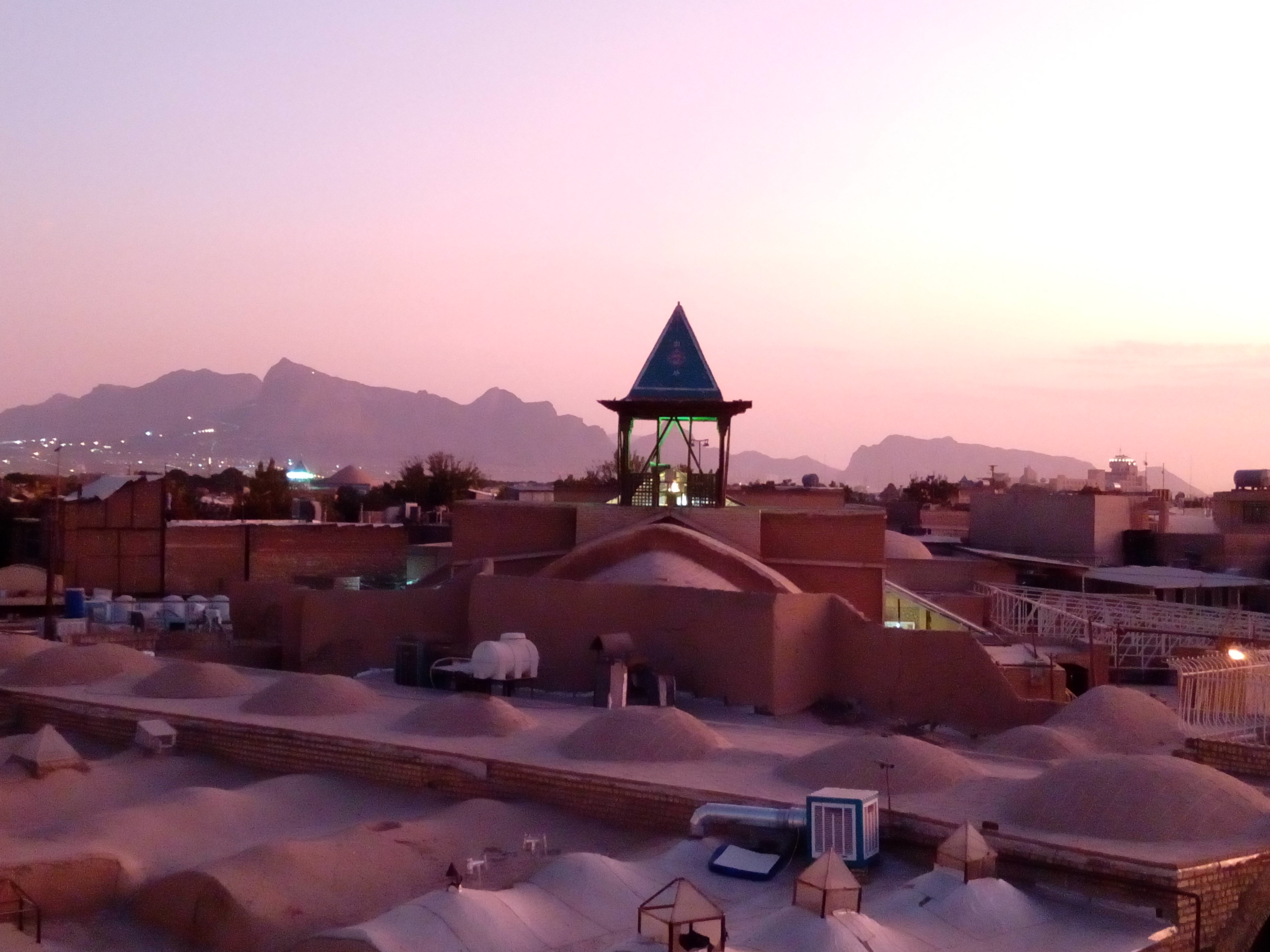
- The mosque turret spire

- Location of the mosque in Iran

Religion
- Affiliation: Shia Islam
- Ecclesiastical or organisational status: Mosque
- Status: Active

Location
- Location: Esfahan, Isfahan Province
- Country: Iran
- Coordinates: 32°39′58″N 51°40′33″E

Architecture
- Type: Mosque architecture
- Style: Qajar
- Founder: Mohammad Jafar Abadei
- Completed: 1878 CE

Specifications
- Spire: One (turret)
- Materials: Bricks; mortar; tiles

Iran National Heritage List
- Official name: Abadei Tekyeh
- Type: Mosque/Tekyeh
- Designated: 1951
- Reference no.: 388
- Conservation organization: Cultural Heritage, Handicrafts and Tourism Organization of Iran

The Mohammad Jafar Abadei Mosque (Persian: مسجد محمد جعفرآباده‌ای), or more simply known as the Abadei Mosque, is a Shi'ite mosque, located in Esfahan, in the province of Isfahan, Iran.

The mosque was built in 1878 by the famous clergyman of the Qajar era, Mohammad Jafar Abadei. The mosque is famous because of its tiles and its architecture.

The mosque was added to the Iran National Heritage List on 20 June 1979, administered by the Cultural Heritage, Handicrafts and Tourism Organization of Iran.

== See also ==
- Shia Islam in Iran
- List of mosques in Iran
