= Emamzadeh Soltan Mir Ahmad =

- Fin Garden امامزاده سلطان میراحمد
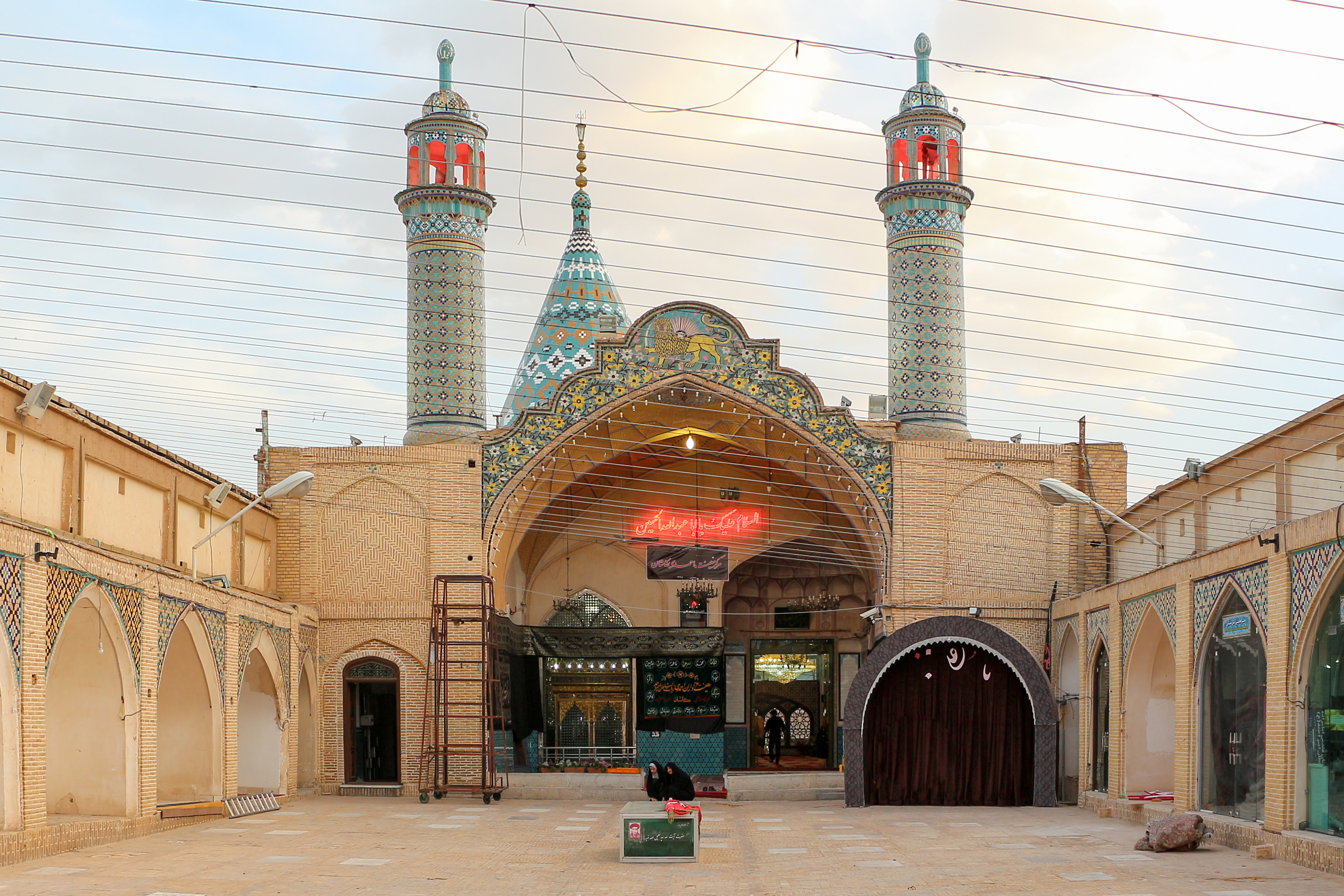

- Location within Iran

Religion
- Affiliation: Shia Islam
- Province: Isfahan

Location
- Location: Kashan, Iran
- Municipality: Kashan
- Coordinates: 33.974961°N 51.439617°E

Architecture
- Type: Imamzadeh
- Designated as NHL

Iran National Heritage List
- Official name: Emamzadeh Soltan Mir Ahmad
- Type: Emamzadeh
- Designated: 1942
- Reference no.: 352
- Conservation organization: Cultural Heritage, Handicrafts and Tourism Organization of Iran

Emamzadeh Soltan Mir Ahmad is an Emamzadeh in Kashan, Iran. The tiling in front of the larger iwan and the two minarets of the building were repaired and rebuilt in the Qajar era. The emamzadeh includes a large courtyard, an iwan and a shrine. It has a conical dome and big porticoes.

== See also ==
- List of the historical structures in the Isfahan province
