= Golpayegan minaret =

Historical minaret in Iran

- مناره گلپایگان
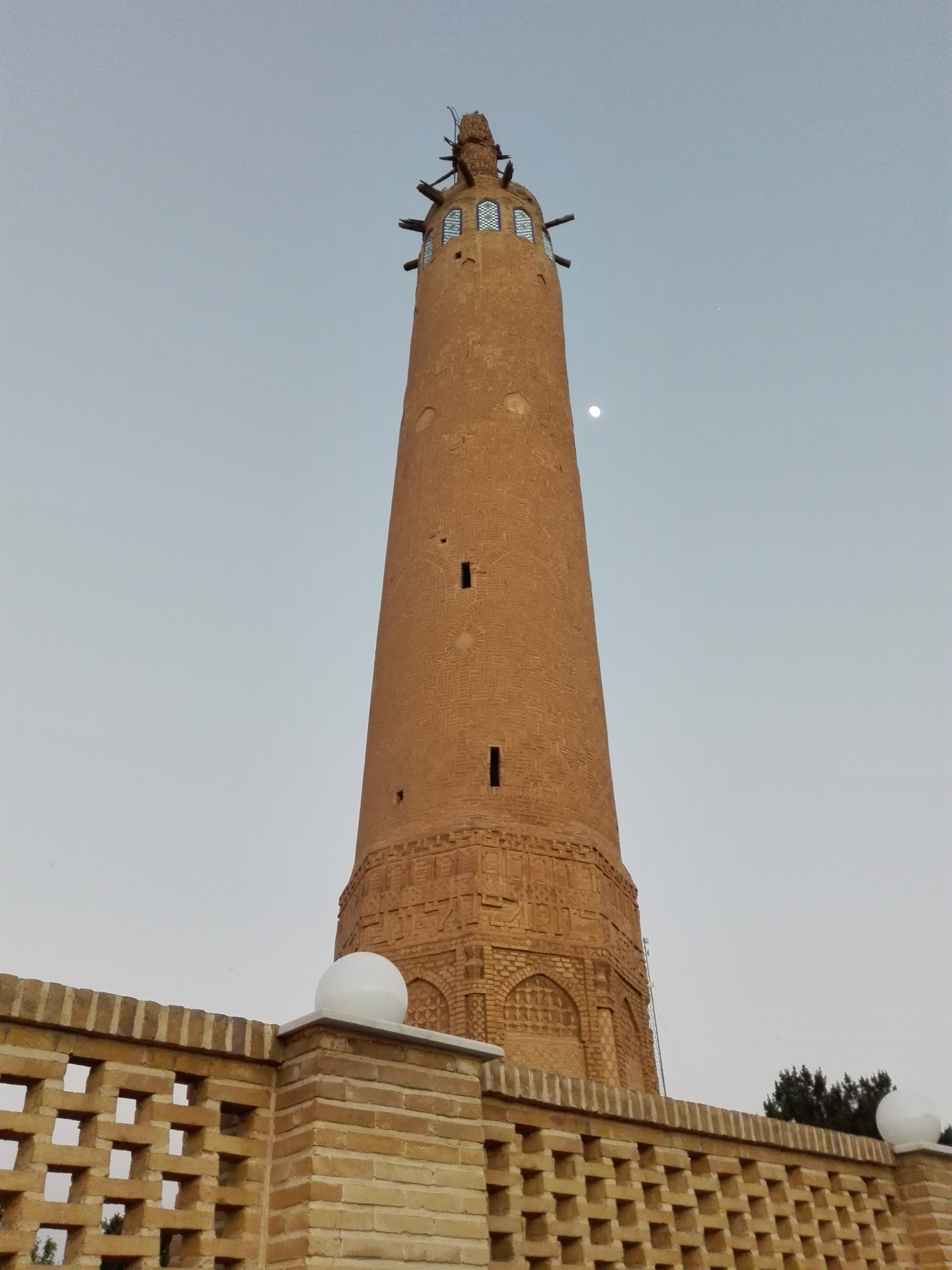

- Location within Iran

Religion
- Affiliation: Islam
- Province: Isfahan

Location
- Location: Golpayegan, Iran
- Municipality: Golpayegan
- Coordinates: 33.452420°N 50.291123°E

Architecture
- Type: Minaret
- Style: Razi
- Height (max): 18 m

Iran National Heritage List
- Official name: Golpaygan Minaret
- Type: Minaret
- Designated: 1936
- Reference no.: 250
- Conservation organization: Cultural Heritage, Handicrafts and Tourism Organization of Iran

The Golpayegan minaret (Persian: مناره گلپایگان), also known as the Golpayegan tower, is a historical minaret in the city of Golpayegan in Iran. It is one of the highest eleventh century minarets. The minaret is located in the Emam Khomeini street, Ayatollah Taleghani intersection, opposite the Fanous park.

== Structure ==
The minaret has two doors. Inside the minaret, there is a staircase. Upper and lower parts of the minaret has a brick Kufic inscription. There are no dates on the inscriptions. The inscription text includes some verses from Koran. The Golpayagan minaret is 900 years old and has resisted by now against natural phenomenons like earthquake, wind, rain, cold and heat. It is one of the highest minarets in Iran and has two circular staircases with 64 steps, which lead to the top of the minaret.

This minaret dates back to the Seljukid era and it is probably as old as Jameh mosque of Golpayegan and Chahar Sough bazaar.

It is said that the minaret was used for guiding caravans and a light was lit on top of the minaret for this purpose. The southern gate of Chahar Sough bazaar was located in front of the minaret.
