= Kassegaran Madrasa =

Madrasa in Isfahan, Iran

- Location within Iran

Religion
- Province: Isfahan

Location
- Location: Isfahan, Iran
- Municipality: Isfahan
- Coordinates: 32°40′16″N 51°41′8″E

Architecture
- Type: Madrasa
- Style: Isfahani
- Completed: 1694
- Designated as NHL

Iran National Heritage List
- Official name: Kassegaran Religious School مدرسه کاسه گران
- Type: Religious School
- Designated: 1951
- Reference no.: 386
- Conservation organization: Cultural Heritage, Handicrafts and Tourism Organization of Iran

Kassegaran Madrasa (Persian: مدرسه کاسه گران) is a historical madrasa in Isfahan, Iran. It belongs to the era of the Safavid King Suleiman. According to the thuluth inscription above its portal, it was built in 1694 by the order and under supervision of Amir Mohammad Mehdi Hakimolmolk Ardestani.
