= Malek Vineyard =

Historic house in Isfahan, Iran

- انگورستان ملک
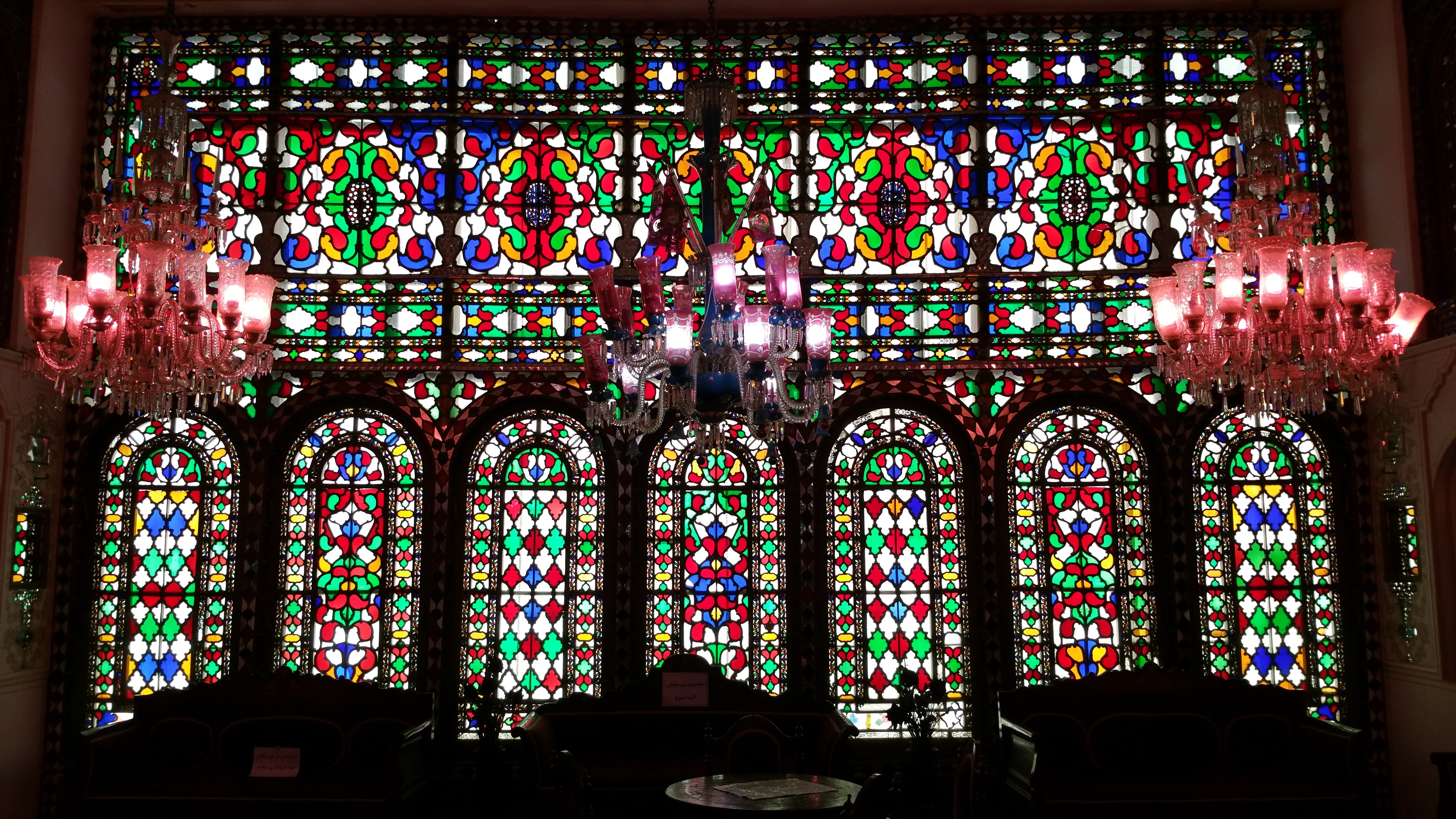

- Location within Iran

General information
- Type: house
- Location: Isfahan, Iran
- Coordinates: 32.6541°N 51.686456°E

Website
- https://angourestanmalek.com

The Malek vineyard is a historic house in Isfahan, Iran. The house had been taken as tax from the people in the era of Nader Shah and was for a long time a part of assets of a rich man in the city, Haj Malek. He was one of the Persians in Bahrain who immigrated to Isfahan during Nader Shah's reign.

During the reign of Naser al-Din Shah Qajar, Malek vineyard was confiscated by the shah. Naser al-Din Shah's successors declared it as a public asset and a part of national treasury. In Mohammad Ali Shah's era, a Hussainiya was built in the garden and its administration was handed over to an Isfahanian businessman called Malek ot-Tojar. Parts of the vineyard and its building has been destroyed during the expansion and development of the city. The remaining parts include a central yard and a dining room. Presently Malek vineyard is used as Hussainia and a permit is needed for visiting.

== Gallery ==
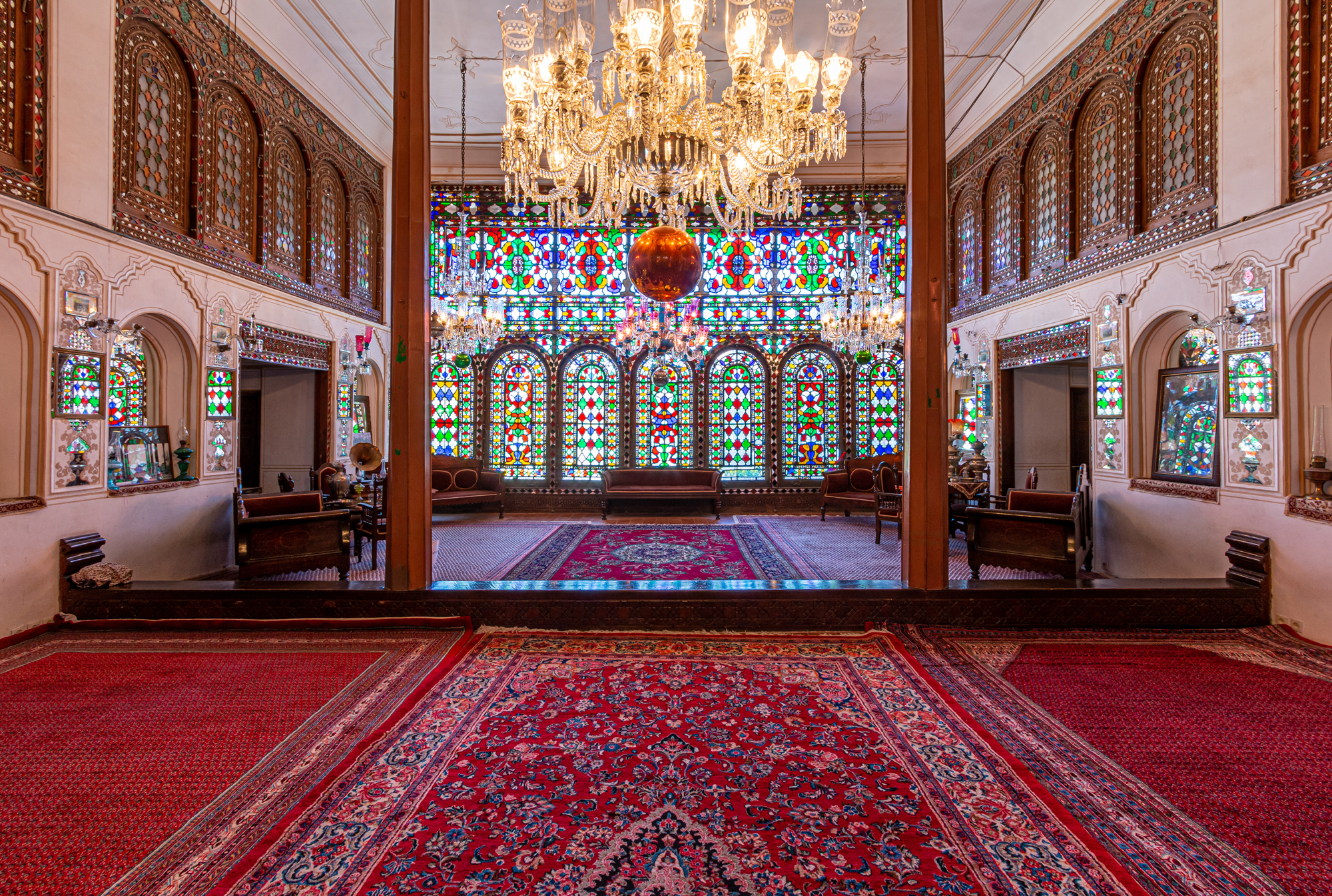

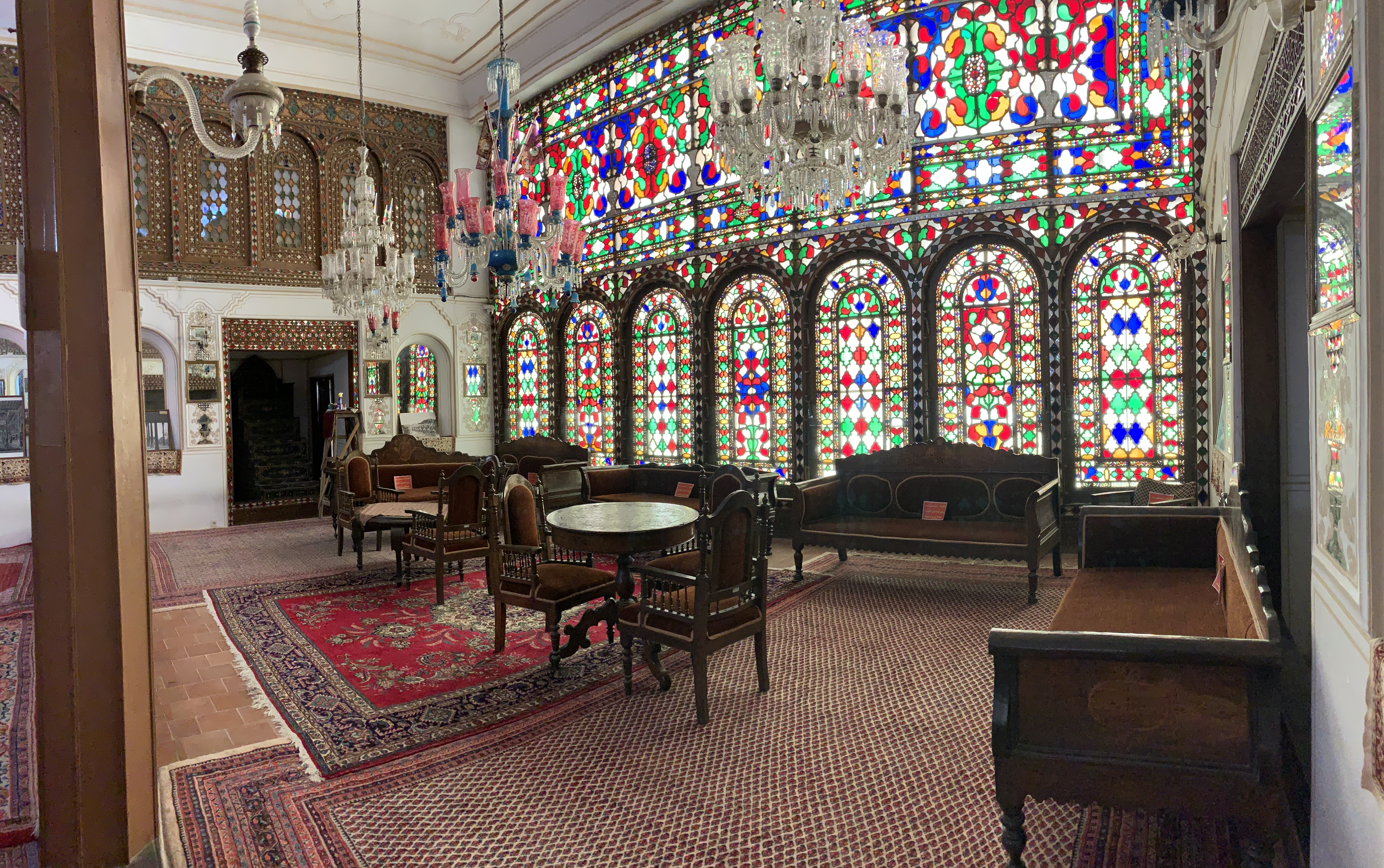

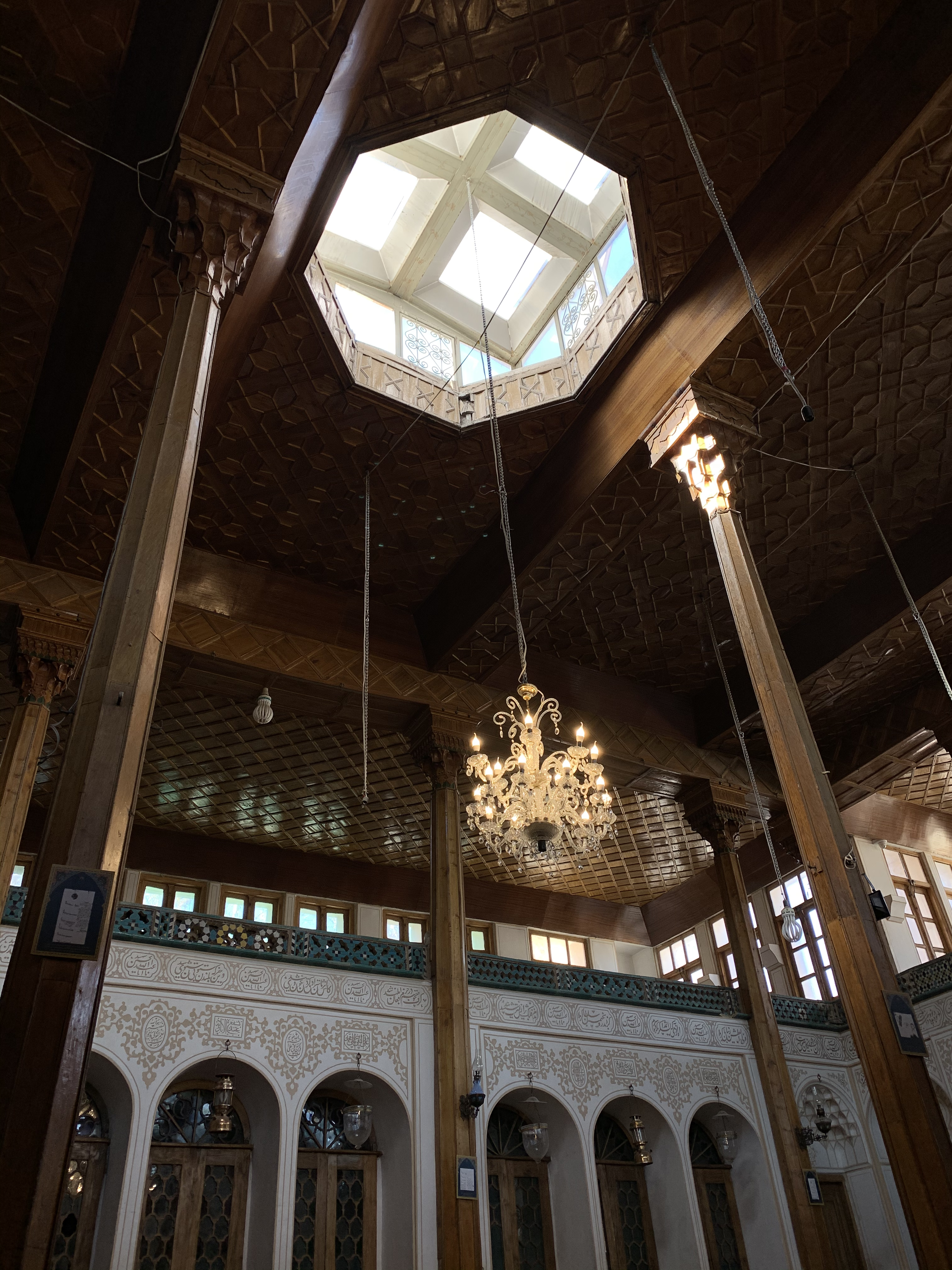

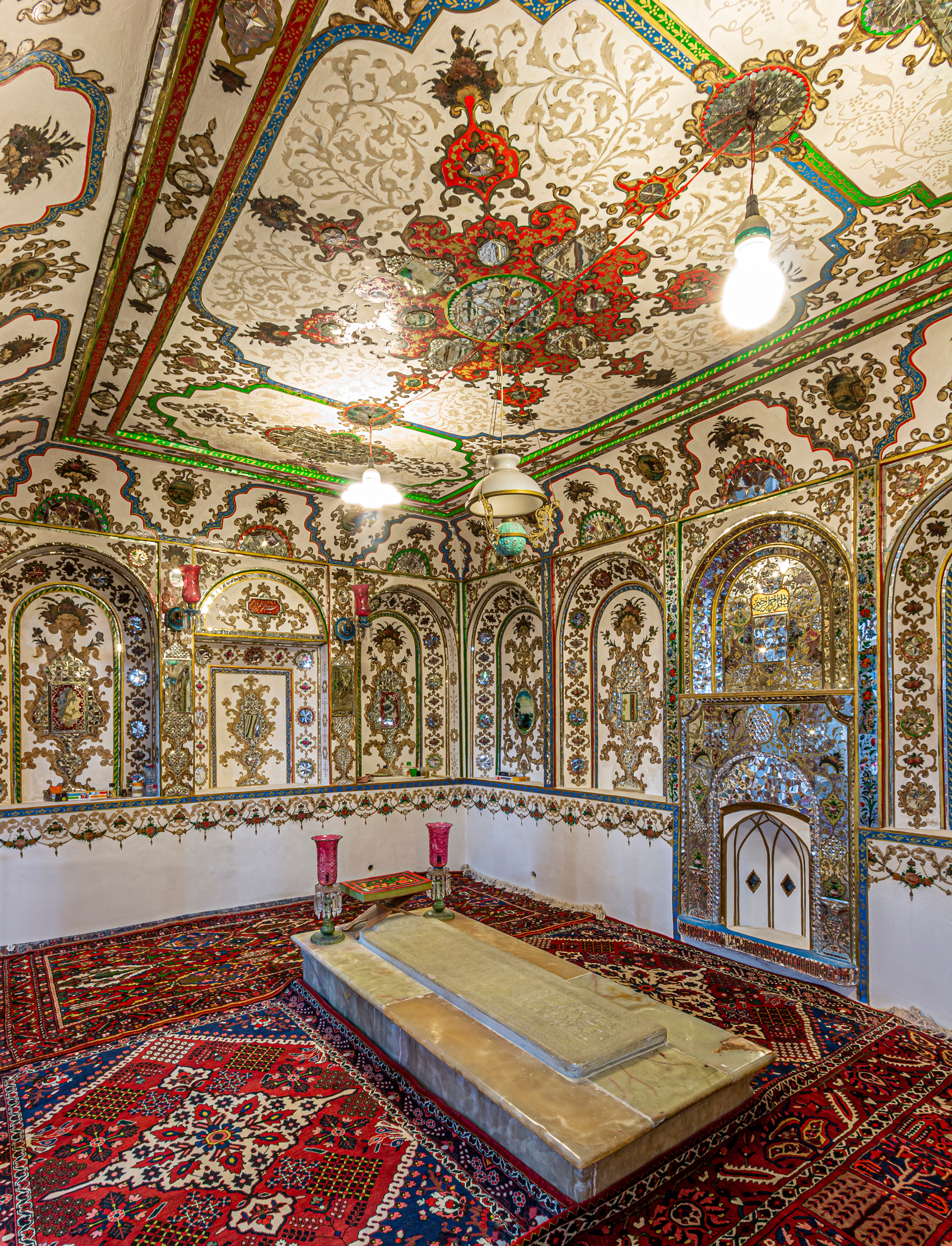
