= Bannai script =

Islamic calligraphy script

Bannai script, Qeysarie Gate, Isfahan, 17th century. with a poem from the introductory of the Saadi's Gulistan

Bannai, Isfahan 15th/16th century, Koran-Sura 112 al-Ikhlāṣ

Bannai is a form of Islamic calligraphy. It is a kind of angular Kufic script, which has geometric forms like square, rhombus, rectangular, parallel and crossed lines. It was used primarily in Iran in building inscriptions. The foundation of Bannai is the horizontal and vertical directions of the lines, which have equal thickness and completely fill the geometrical form.

== See also ==
- Labyrinth
- Maze
- Nine-fold seal script
- Space-filling curve
- Square Kufic
