= Qeysarie Gate =

Historic gate in Isfahan, Iran

Qeysarieh Gate
- سردر قیصریه
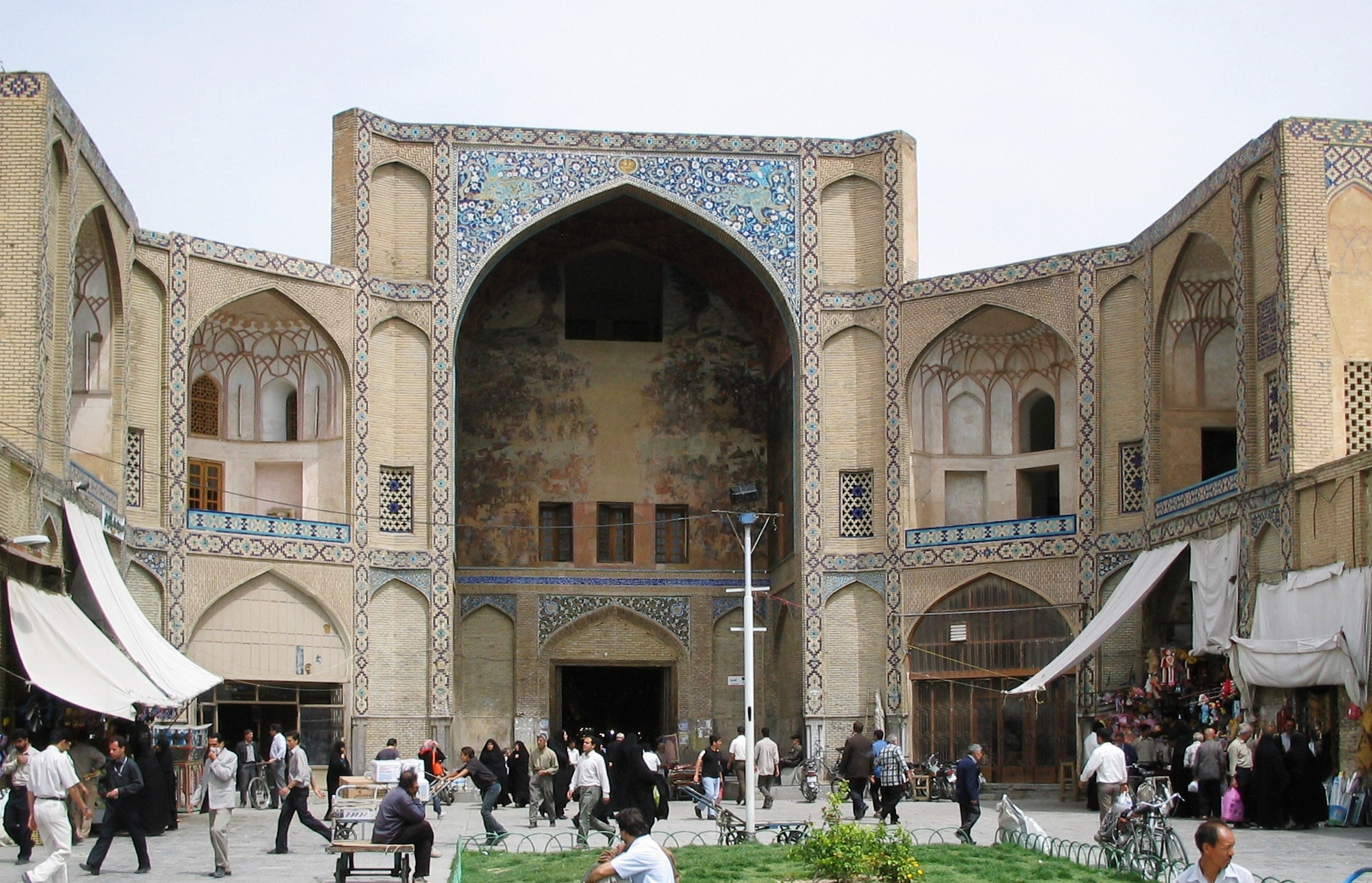

- Location within Iran

General information
- Status: Cultural
- Type: Gate
- Location: Isfahan, Iran
- Coordinates: 32.6603°N 51.6767°E

Iran National Heritage List
- Official name: Qeysarieh Gate
- Type: Gate
- Designated: 1932
- Reference no.: 103
- Conservation organization: Cultural Heritage, Handicrafts and Tourism Organization of Iran

The Qeysarie gate is a historic gate in the main entrance of the Grand Bazaar of Isfahan (or Qeysarie Bazaar) in Isfahan, Iran. The gate originally had 3 floors, but the third floor was destroyed later. The destroyed third floor had been a Naqqarekhane. The gate was built in the 17th century during the Safavid era

== History ==
The Qeysarie gate may be named after Alexandria in Egypt.

== Gallery ==
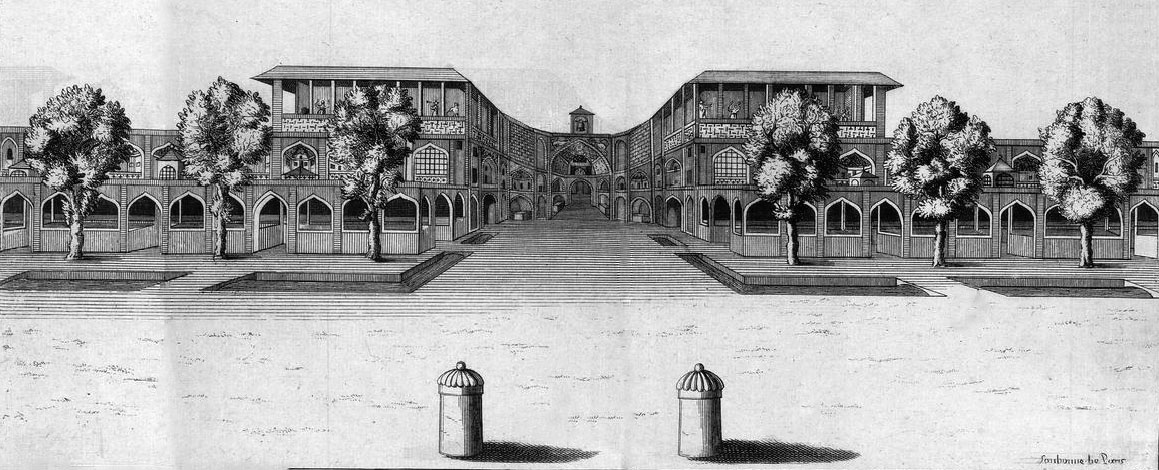
An illustration of Qesariye gate by Jean Chardin, 1705

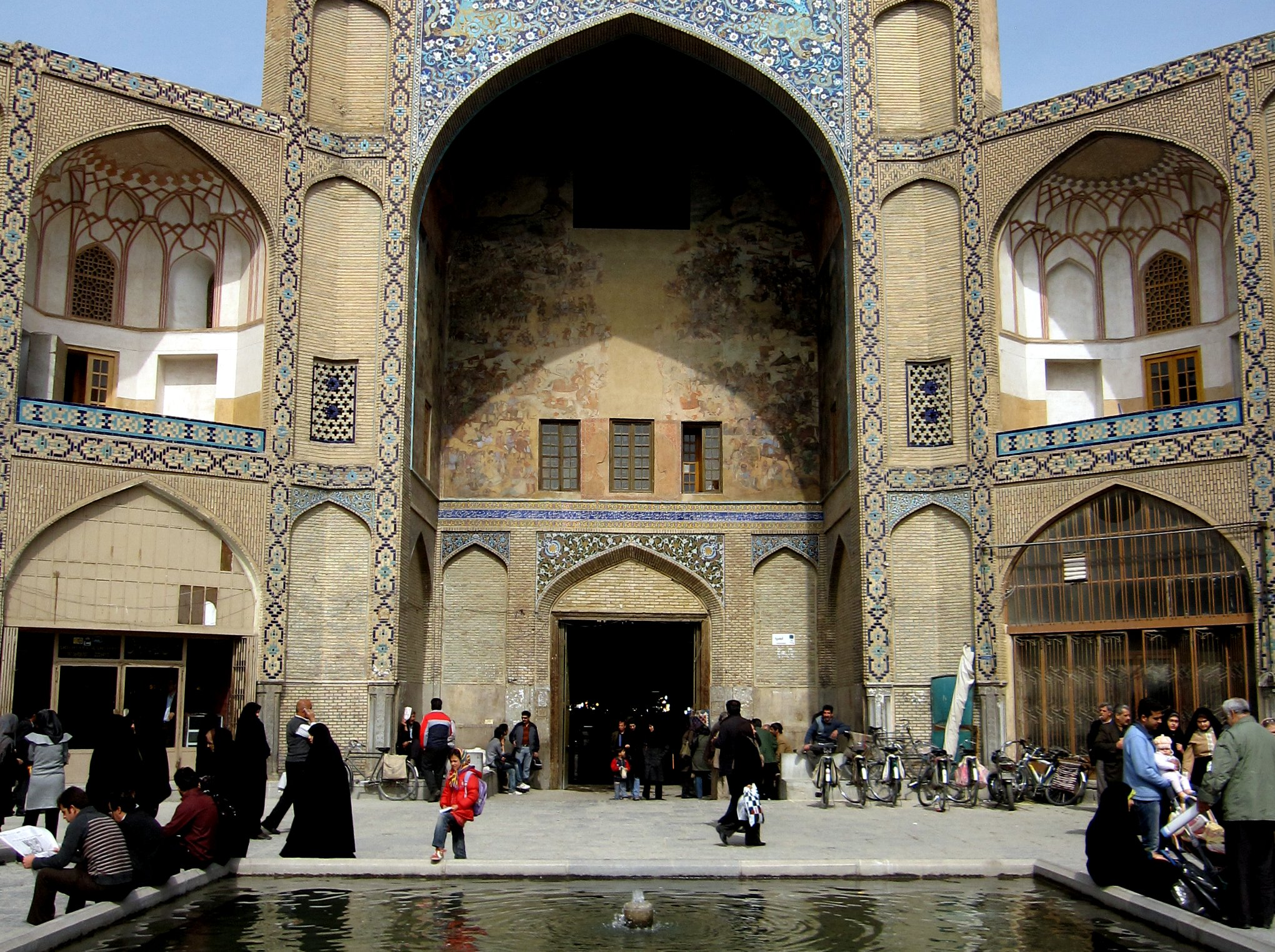
Exterior view, 2011

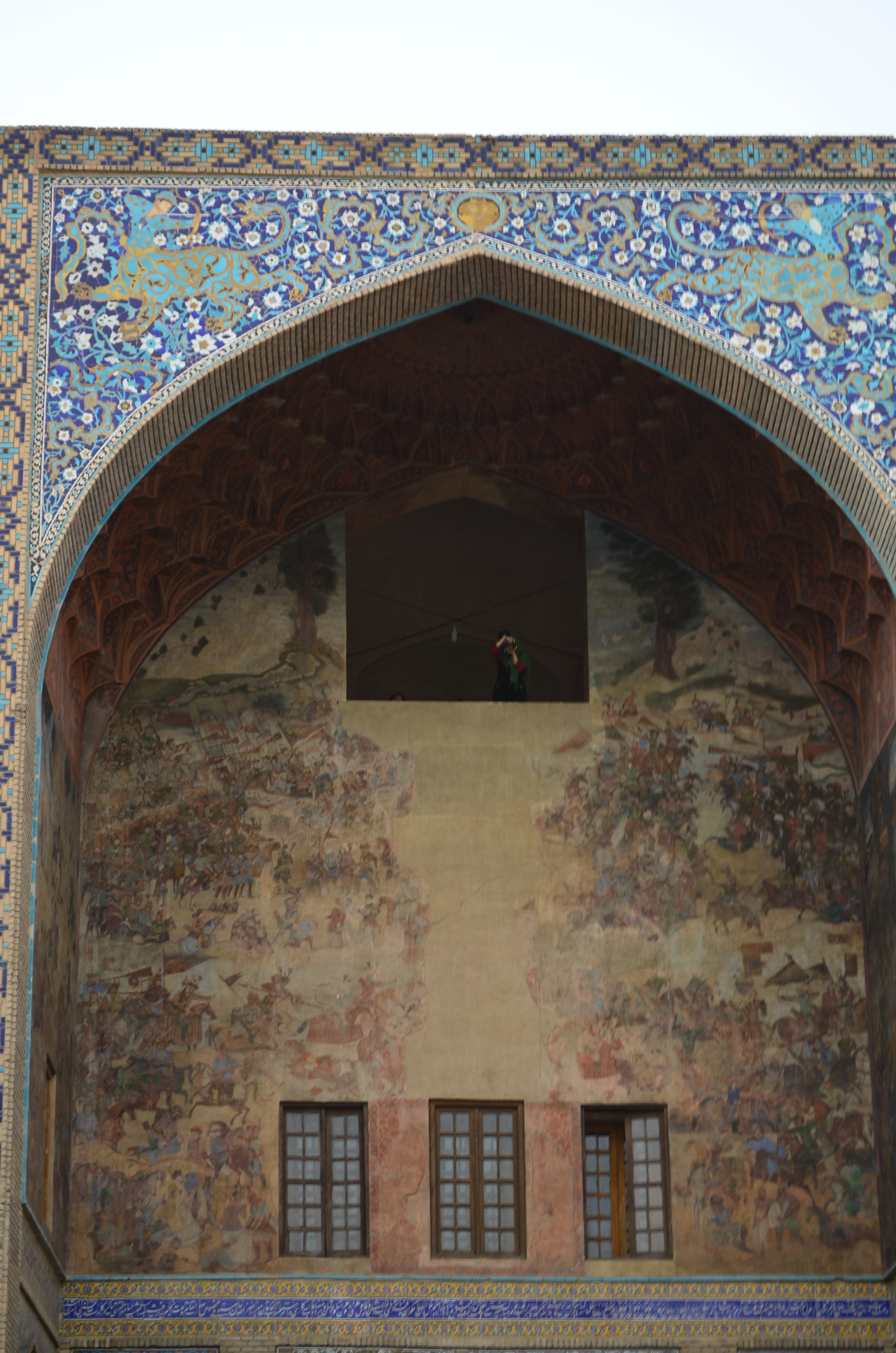
Exterior view, 2015

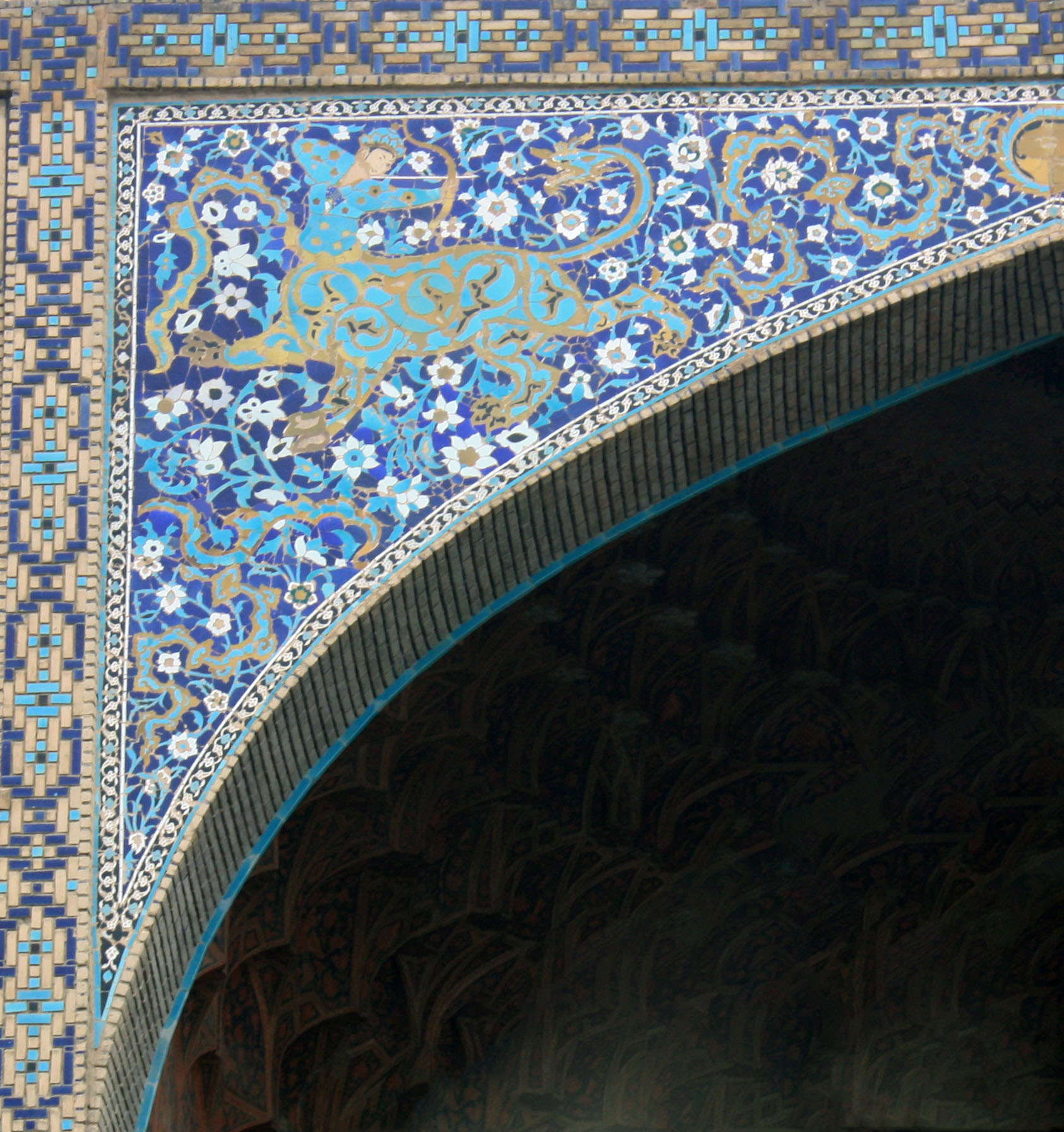
Tilework on the gate, 2012

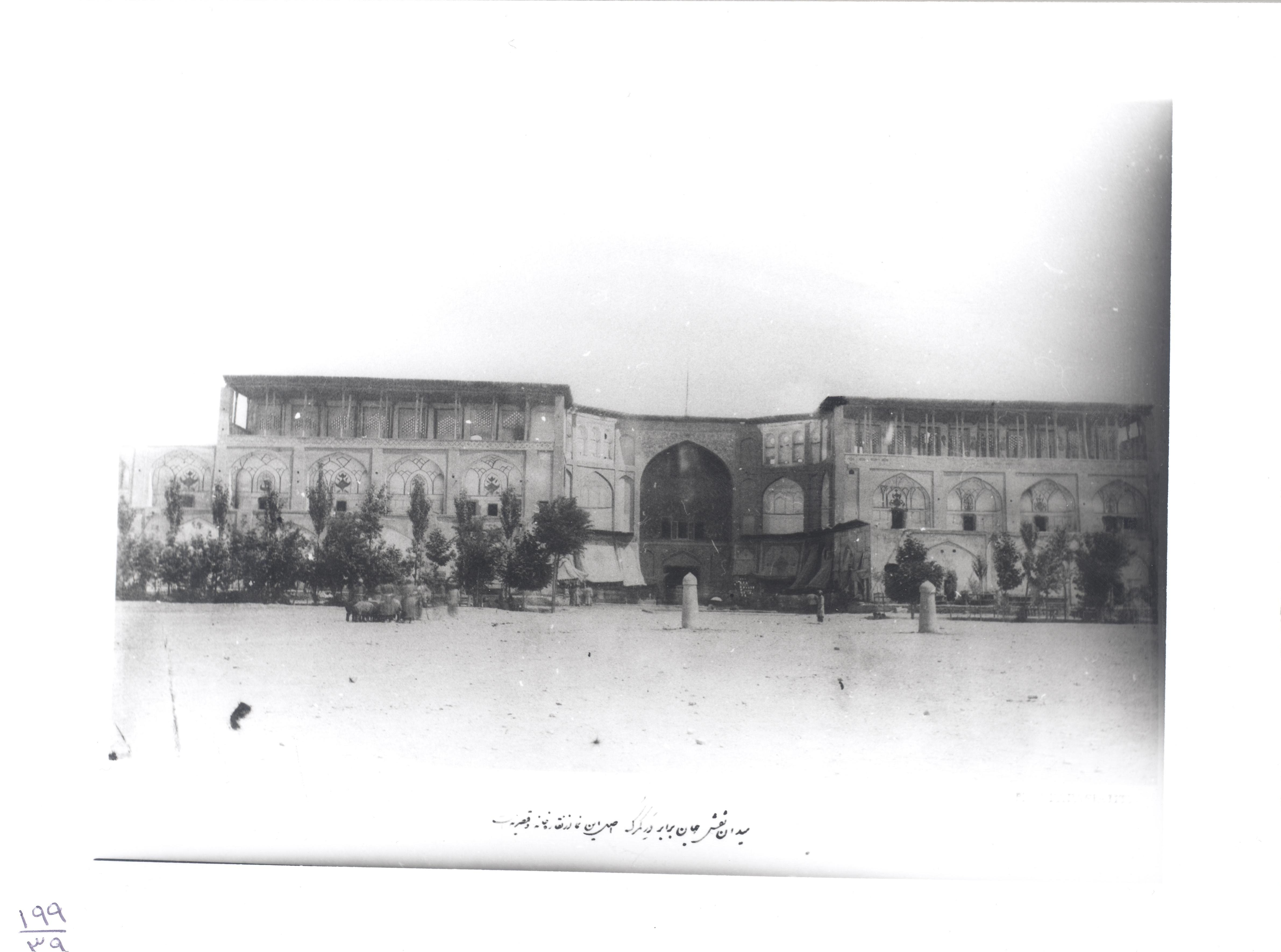
Qeysarieh gate by Joseph Papasian, 19th century

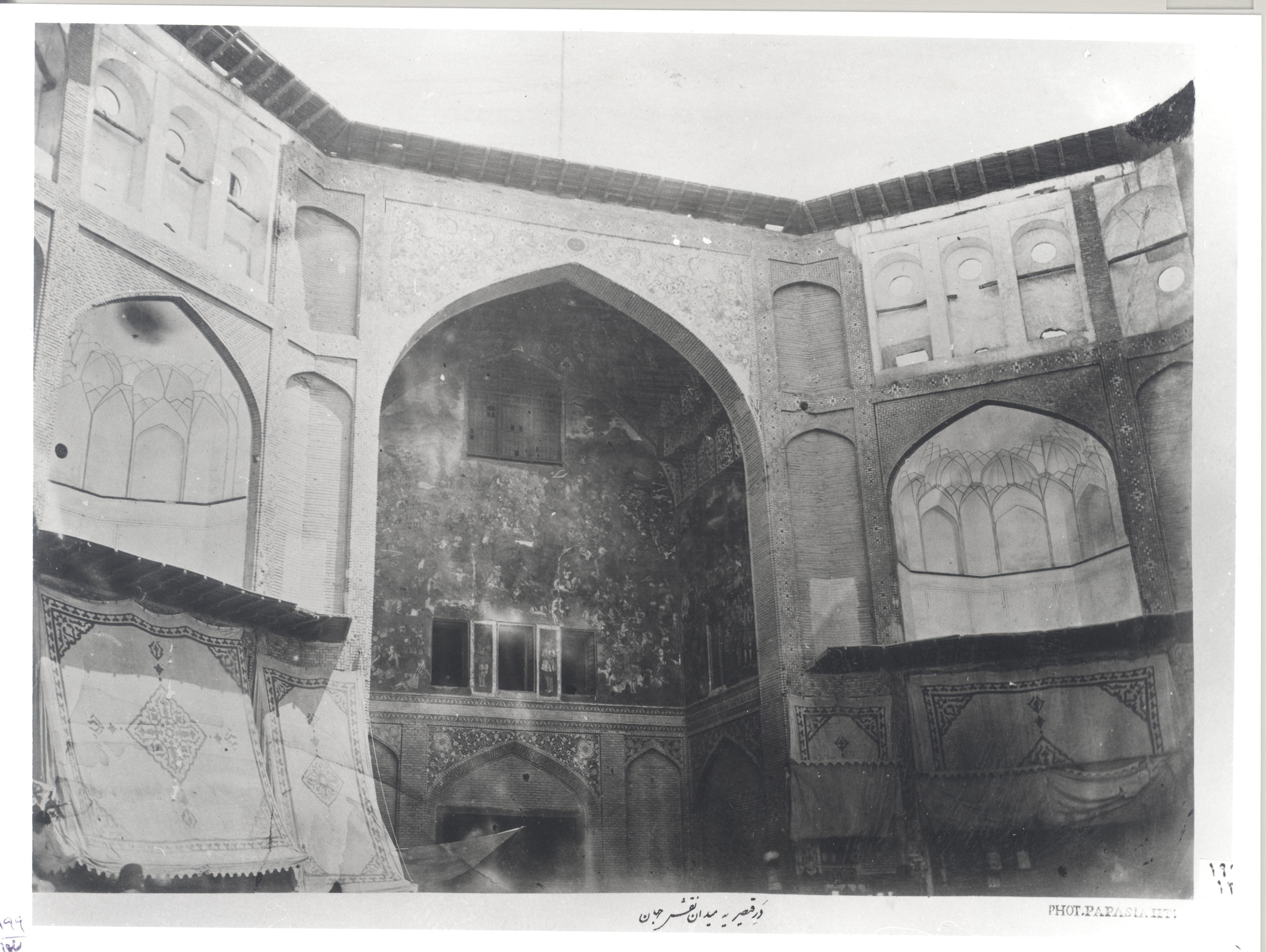
Qeysarieh gate by Joseph Papasian, 19th century

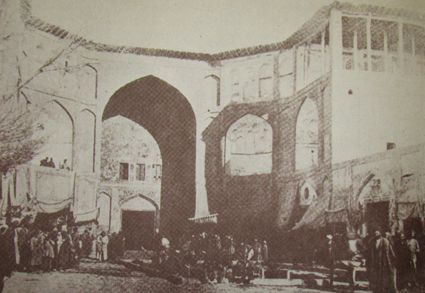
Old photograph of the gate

Bannai script, Qeysarie Gate, Isfahan, 17th century. with a persian poem from the introductory of the Saadi's Gulistan

== See also ==
- List of the historical structures in the Isfahan province
