= List of bazaars in Iran =

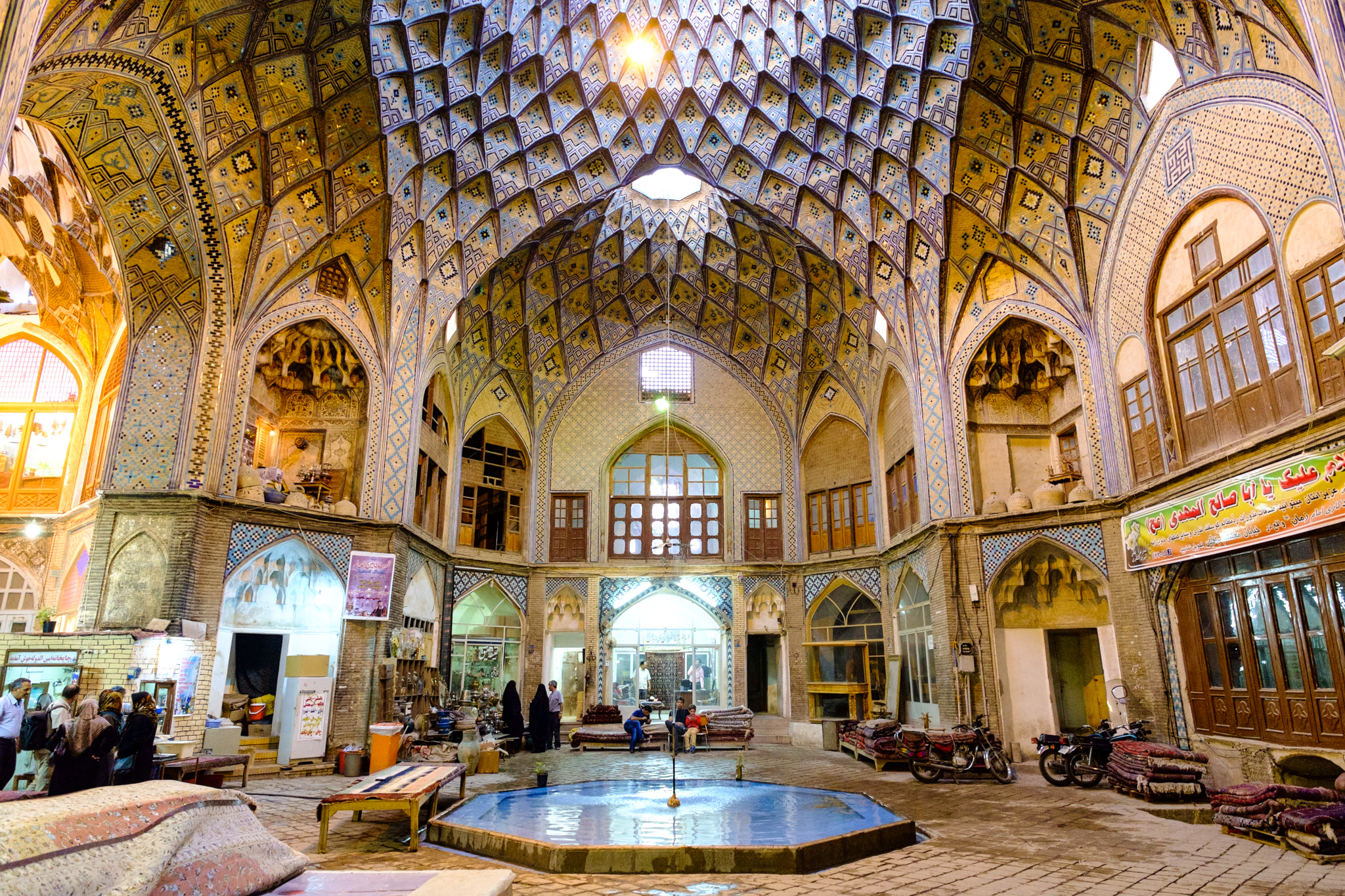
The Bazaar of Kashan

A bazaar or souk, is a permanently enclosed marketplace or street where goods and services are exchanged or sold.

The term bazaar originates from the Persian word bāzār. The term bazaar is sometimes also used to refer to the "network of merchants, bankers and craftsmen" who work in that area. Although the word "bazaar" is of Persian origin, its use has spread and now has been accepted into the vernacular in countries around the world.

The term souk (Arabic: سوق suq, Hebrew: שוק shuq, Syriac: ܫܘܩܐ shuqa, Armenian: շուկա shuka, Spanish: zoco, also spelled souq, shuk, shooq, soq, esouk, succ, suk, sooq, suq, soek) is used in Western Asian, North African and some Horn African cities (Amharic: ሱቅ sooq).

== List of bazaars ==
| Building | Location | Image | Notes |
|---|---|---|---|
| Ardabil Bazaar | Ardabil | | Ardabil Bazaar was built during Safavid dynasty in Ardabil, north-western Iran. In the 4th century historians described the bazaar as a building in the shape of the cross with a domed ceiling. It was constructed during the Safavid dynasty from the 16th to 18th century and renovated through the Zand dynasty in the 18th century. |
| Bazaar of Borujerd | Borujerd | | Located in the centre of the city, the bazaar consists of many Rasteh Bazaars and Caravanserais. A Rasteh Bazaar is a lane with covered roof usually with shops and workshops of a particular profession. Some of the important Rasteh Bazaars of Borujerd are: Rassa or shoe makers and shoe shops bazaar which is the largest Rasteh; Bazaare Mesgarha for coppersmiths; Bazaare Chelengarha for blacksmiths; Bazaare Ghofl Sazha for locksmiths; Bazaare Kaftar Forushha for birds and pigeons; Bazaare Yahoodiha or Jews Bazaar; Caravansaries have been used for trading as well as accommodation of business people. Today, caravansaries of Borujerd are important centre of wholesale or regional, national or international trading of Persian rug and other handicrafts. |
| Grand Bazaar | Isfahan | | It was originally constructed during the 11th century, on the southwest wing of Jameh Mosque and Kohneh Square but various arcades and rooms were later added to it. The present remnant dates from the Safavid period, during which the Qaysariya Bazaar was built on the north wing of Naqsh-e Jahan Square, a square which was developed as a substitute for Kohneh Square. The bazaar, one of the oldest and largest bazaars in the Middle East, dates to Saljuqid and Safavid era and is the longest roofed market in the world. The site has been destroyed several times and the contemporary bazaar dates to the 17th century. The bazaar is a vaulted two-kilometre street linking the old city with the new. |
| Bazaar of Kashan | Kashan | | The old bazaar is located in the center of the city. It is thought to have been built in the Seljuk era with renovations during the Safavid period. The bazaar has a famous architecture, especially at its Timche-ye Amin od-Dowleh section, where a grand light well was built in the 19th century. The bazaar is still in use and is a few miles in total length. In the bazaar's complex beside the main bazaars, there are several mosques, tombs, plazas, arcades, baths, and water reservoirs that each were constructed in a different period. |
| Bazaar of Saqqez | Saqqez | | Located in the centre of the city and consists of many smaller bazaars and Caravanserais. |
| Bazaar of Shahrud | Shahrud | | Shahrood market is dated from the Qajar era and is located in the old texture of the city. |
| Saraye Moshir | Shiraz | | Saraye Moshir is traditional bazaar in the south of Iran. It was founded more than 250 years ago under the order of government general of Fars province in Shiraz named Mirza Abolhassan MoshirolMolk. It was made as bazaar in the first days of its establishment. In some days this place was used as a museum and also as a traditional restaurant and tea-serving center. After the revolution in Iran, it was closed for some years and then became a place for making handcrafts and artful goods until now. |
| Vakil Bazaar | Shiraz | | Vakil Bazaar is the main bazaar of Shiraz, located in the historical center of the city. It is thought that the market originally was established by the Buwayhids in the 11th century CE, and was completed mainly by the Atabaks of Fars, and was renamed after Karim Khan Zand only in the 18th century. The bazaar has beautiful courtyards, caravansarais, bath houses, and old shops which are deemed among the best places in Shiraz to buy Persian rugs, spices, copper handicrafts and antiques. Like other Middle Eastern bazaars, there are a few mosques and Imamzadehs constructed beside or behind the bazaar. |
| Bazaar of Tabriz | Tabriz | | The Bazaar of Tabriz is a historical market situated in the city center. It is one of the oldest bazaars in the Middle East and the largest covered bazaar in the world. It is a UNESCO World Heritage Site. |
| Grand Bazaar | Tehran | | The area around Tehran has been settled since at least the 6th millennium BCE, and while bazaar-like constructions in Iran as a whole have been dated as far back as the 4th millennium BCE, Tehran's bazaar is not that old. It is hard to say exactly when the bazaar first appeared, but in the centuries after the Muslim conquest of Iran, travelers reported the growth of commerce in the area now occupied by the current bazaar. The Grand Bazaar is thus a continuation of this legacy. Research indicates that a portion of today's bazaar predated the growth of the village of Tehran by the time of the Safavid Empire, although it was during and after this period that the bazaar began to grow gradually. Western travelers reported that, by 1660 CE and beyond, the bazaar area had still been largely open and only partially covered. |
