= Asarkhane Shahi =

Historic oil mill in Isfahan, Iran

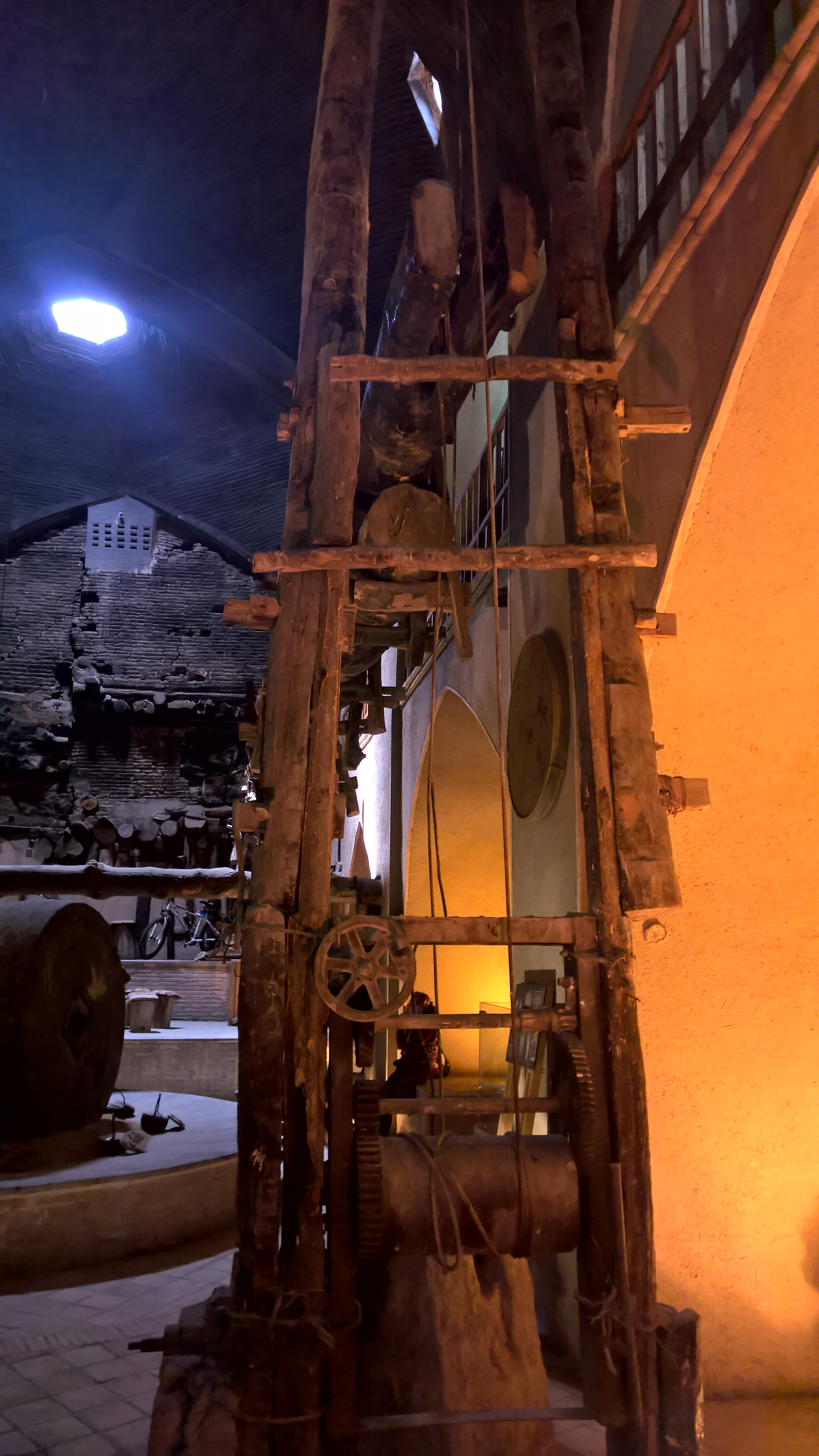
- Interactive map of the Asarkhane Shahi area

General information
- Type: Oil mill
- Coordinates: 32°39′39″N 51°40′40″E
- Client: Shah Abbas I

Asarkhane Shahi (Persian: عصارخانه شاهی, lit. 'Imperial oil mill') is a Safavid era oil mill constructed during the reign of Shah Abbas I at the same time as the Grand bazaar of Isfahan and Molla Abdollah School. The main area of the Asarkhane Shahi was about 1,800 square, but now it is 380 square meters. The only remaining oil mill in the city, it was registered as national heritage of Iran in 1976.
