= Kohneh Square =

Historic square in Isfahan, Iran

Coordinates: 32.6676°N 51.6858°E

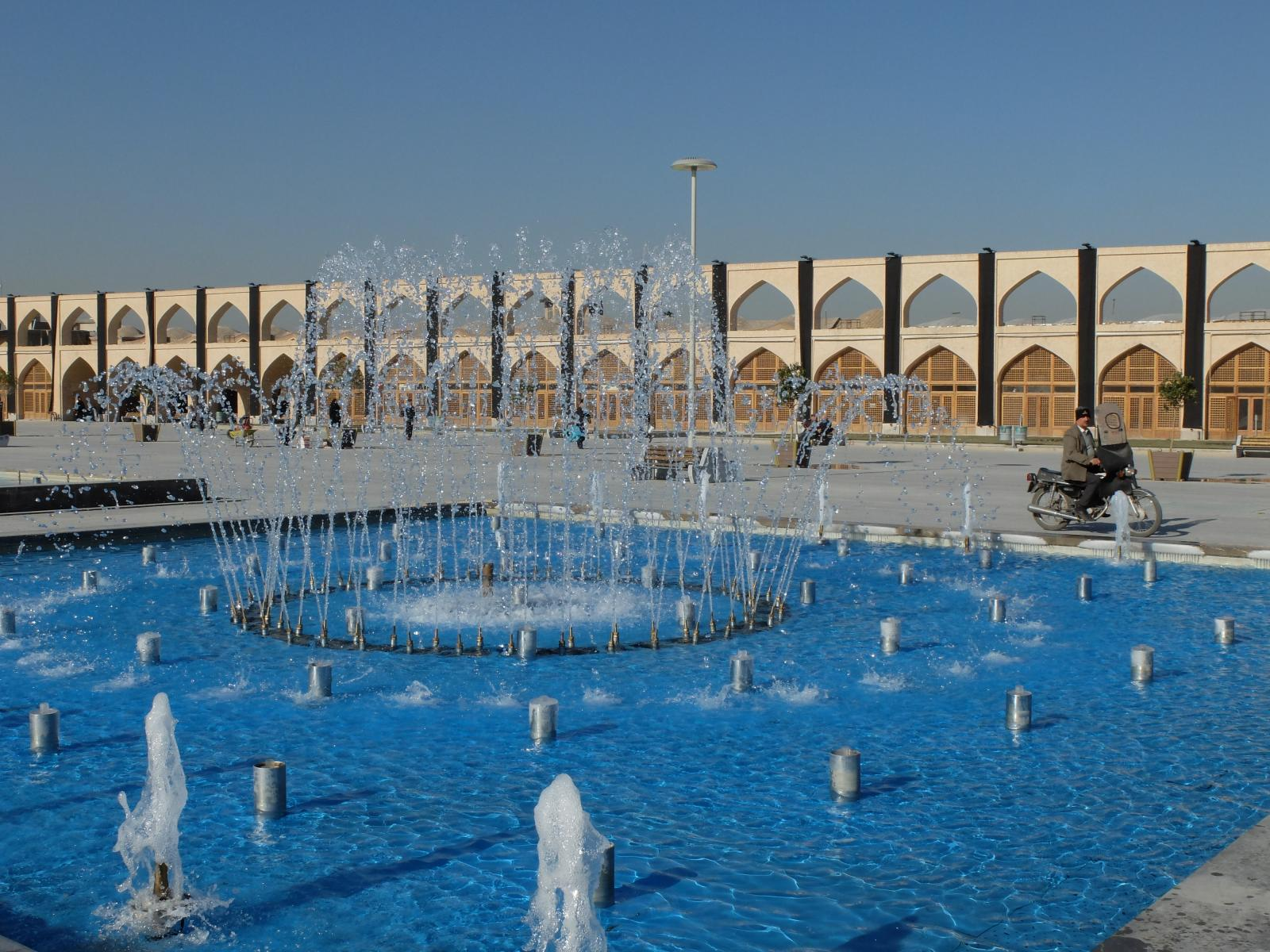
A view of Kohneh Square in Isfahan

Kohneh Square (Persian: میدان کهنه, romanized: Maidān-e Kohneh) is a city square which has been active for centuries in the city of Isfahan, Iran, serving cultural, religious and economic functions. It was once the city's main square. The complex is located near the Grand Bazaar, and the Jameh Mosque. It has also been known as the Atiq Square, Atigh Square, and Imam Ali Square.

== History ==
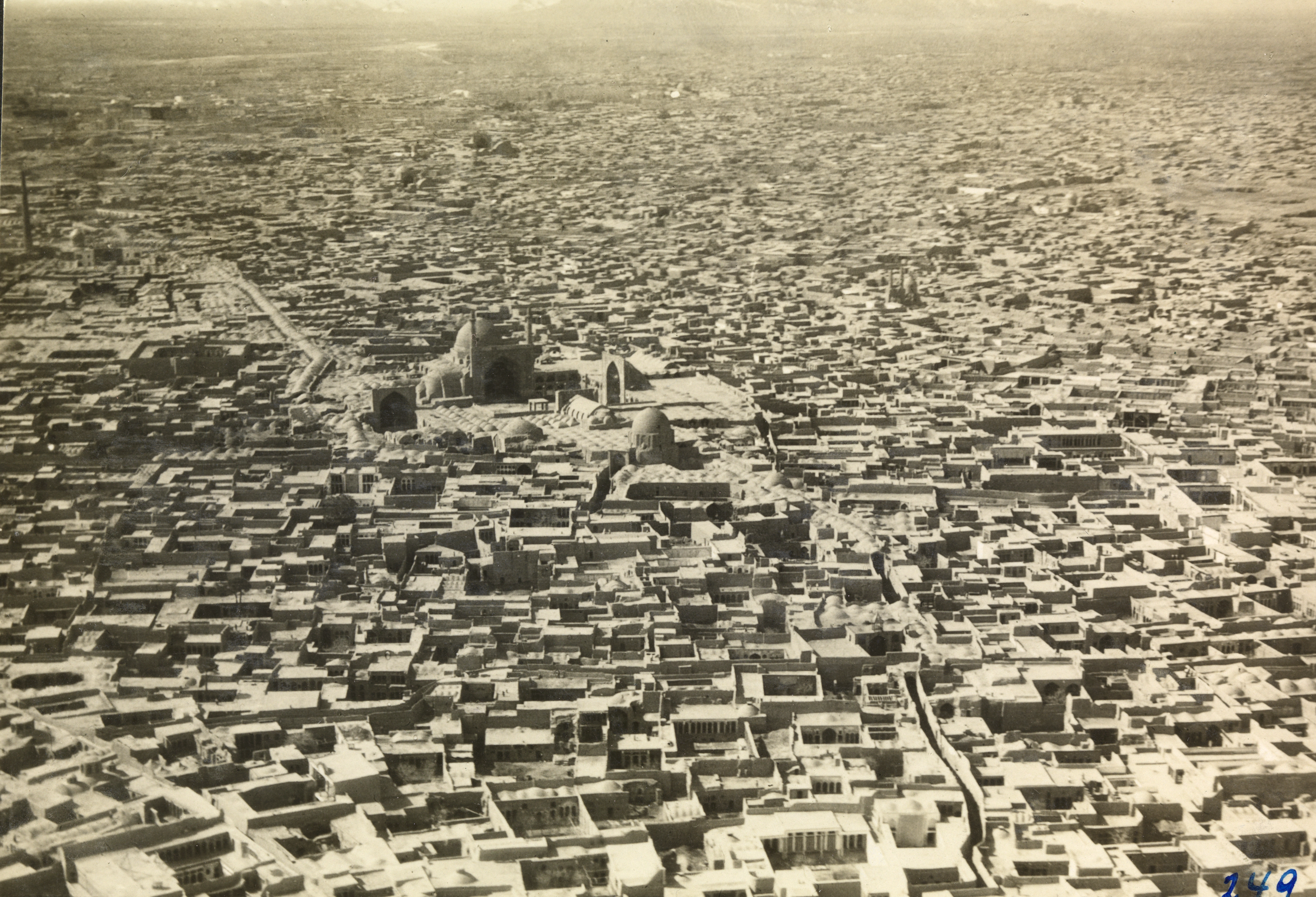
Aerial photo of Kohneh Square by Walter Mittelholzer, 1925

In the 11th century when Isfahan was the capital of the Seljuk Empire, it was the main square and the chief center of the business and social life of the city. It was an important central focus of the city until Naqsh-e Jahan Square was laid out in the 17th century. However, even then, the Kohneh Square preserved its importance as the center of the city's minor activities. With the Jameh Mosque to the north, Grand Bazaar to the west, Harun Velayat Mausoleum and the Ali Mosque to the south, and the Seljuk palaces to the east, the Kohneh Square served as a prototype for the majestic Naqsh-e Jahan Square, which Shah Abbas I created in its vicinity. In 2012, it went through a revitalization by the Municipality of Isfahan.

== Gallery ==
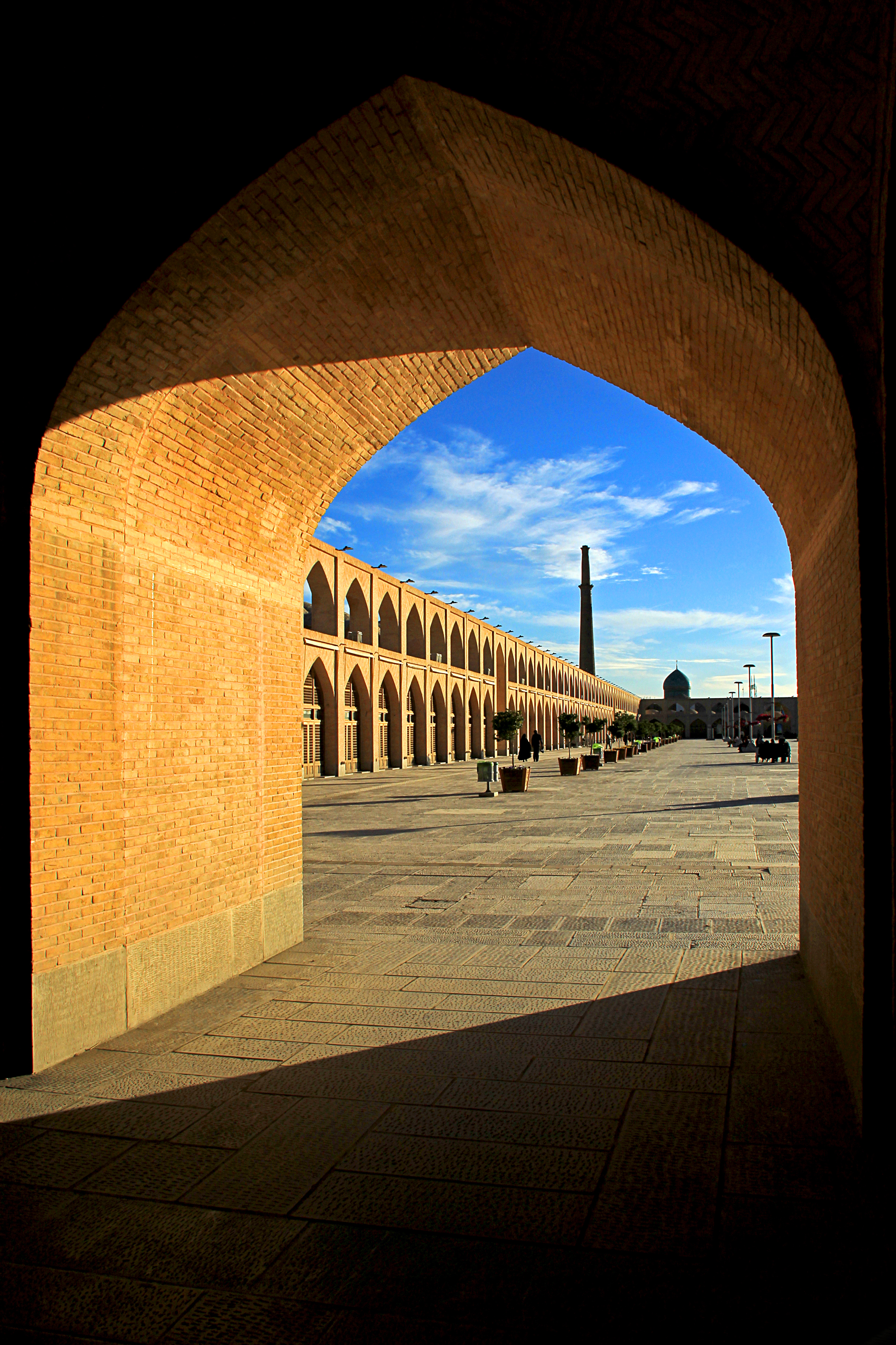

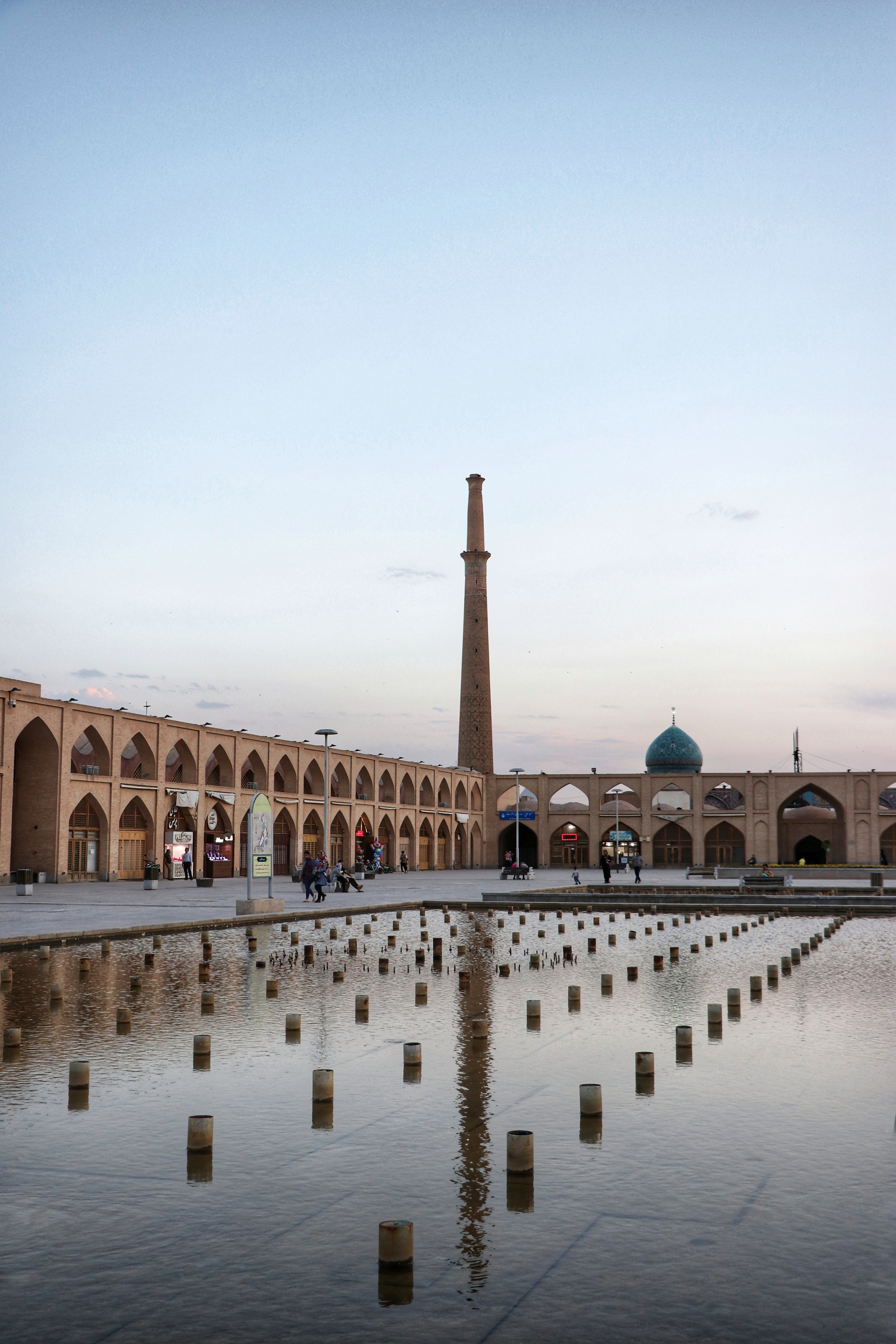
