= Bazaar of Shahrud =

Bazaar in Shahrud, Iran

- بازار شاهرود
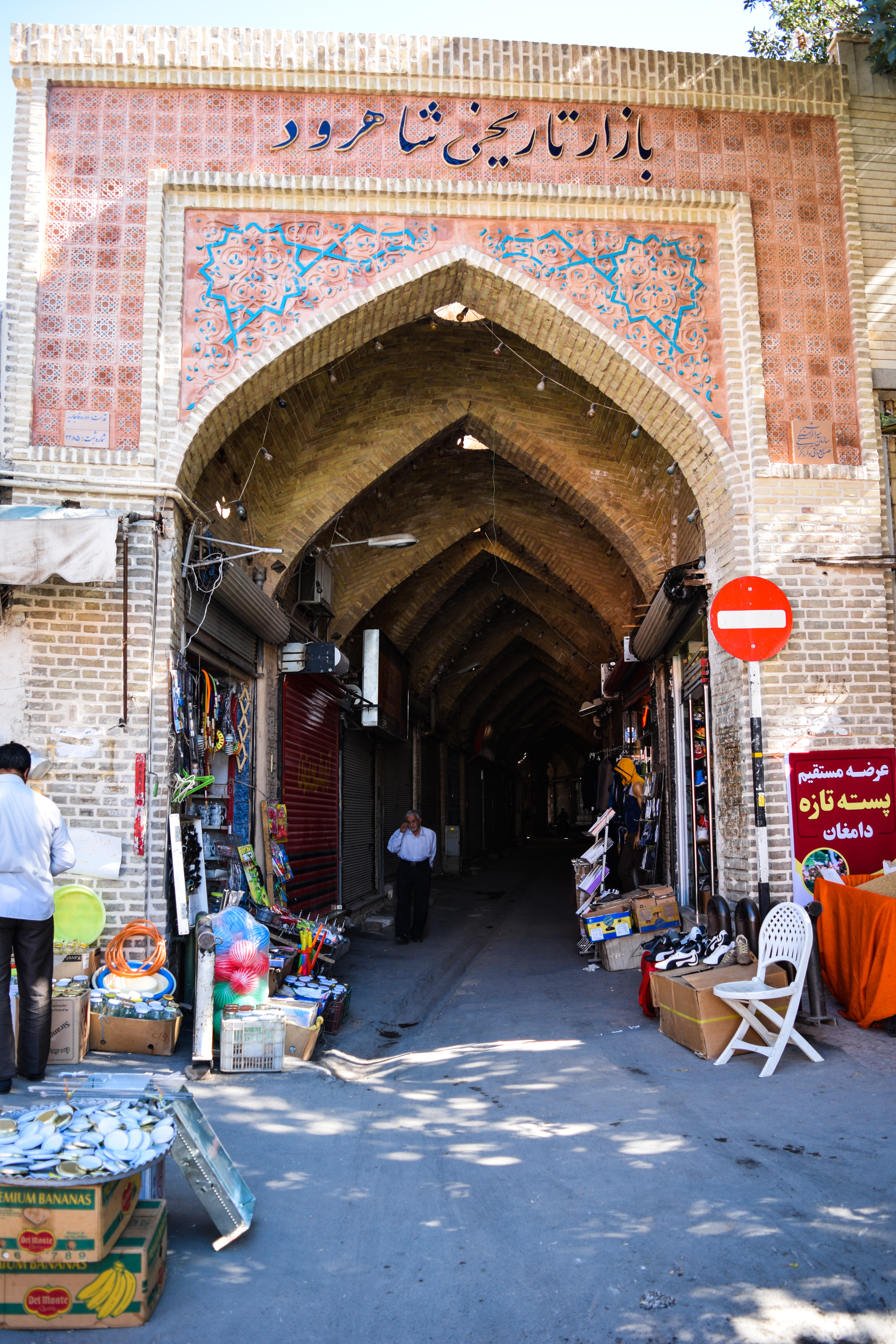
- Entrance to the bazaar in 2015
- Interactive map of the Bazaar of Shahrud area

General information
- Type: Bazaar
- Architectural style: Qajar
- Location: Shahrud, Semnan Province, Iran
- Coordinates: 36°25′22″N 54°57′48″E
- Year built: 19th century

Iran National Heritage List
- Official name: Bazaar of Shahrud
- Type: Built
- Designated: 29 March 1999
- Reference no.: 2285
- Conservation organization: Cultural Heritage, Handicrafts and Tourism Organization of Iran

The Bazaar of Shahrud (Persian: بازار شاهرود), sometimes spelled as the Bazaar of Shahrood, is a bazaar located in the historical part of Shahrud, in Semnan Province, Iran.

The bazaar was completed during the Qajar era, and was added to the Iran National Heritage List on 29 March 1999, administered by the Cultural Heritage, Handicrafts and Tourism Organization of Iran.

== See also ==
- Economy of Iran
- Iranian architecture
