= Grand Bazaar, Isfahan =

Marketplace in Isfahan, Iran

Qeysarie Bazaar
- بازار قیصریه
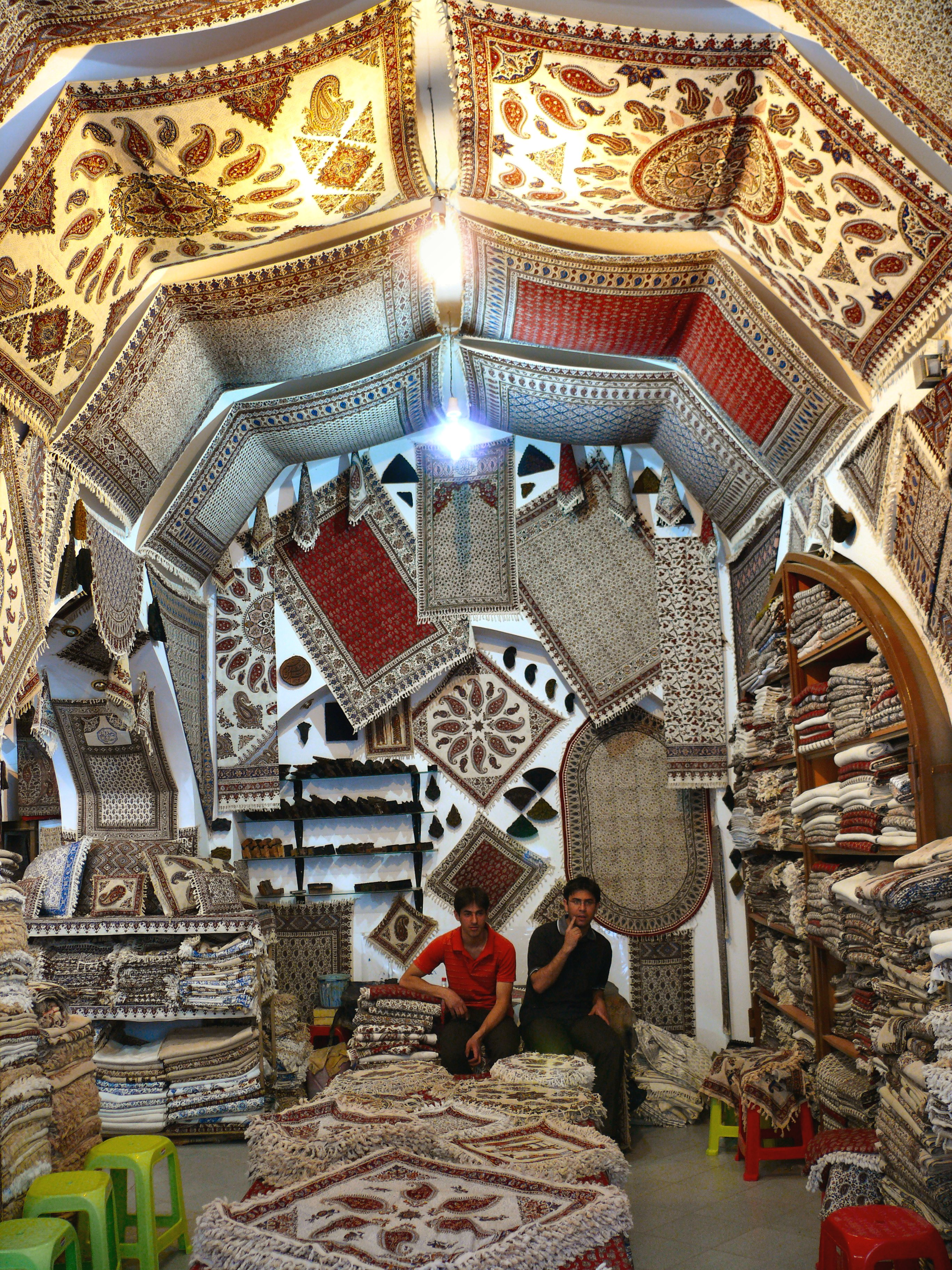

- Location within Iran
- Alternative names: Soltani bazaar

General information
- Status: Cultural
- Type: bazaar
- Architectural style: Isfahani
- Location: Isfahan, Iran
- Coordinates: 32.6631°N 51.6753°E
- Completed: 1620

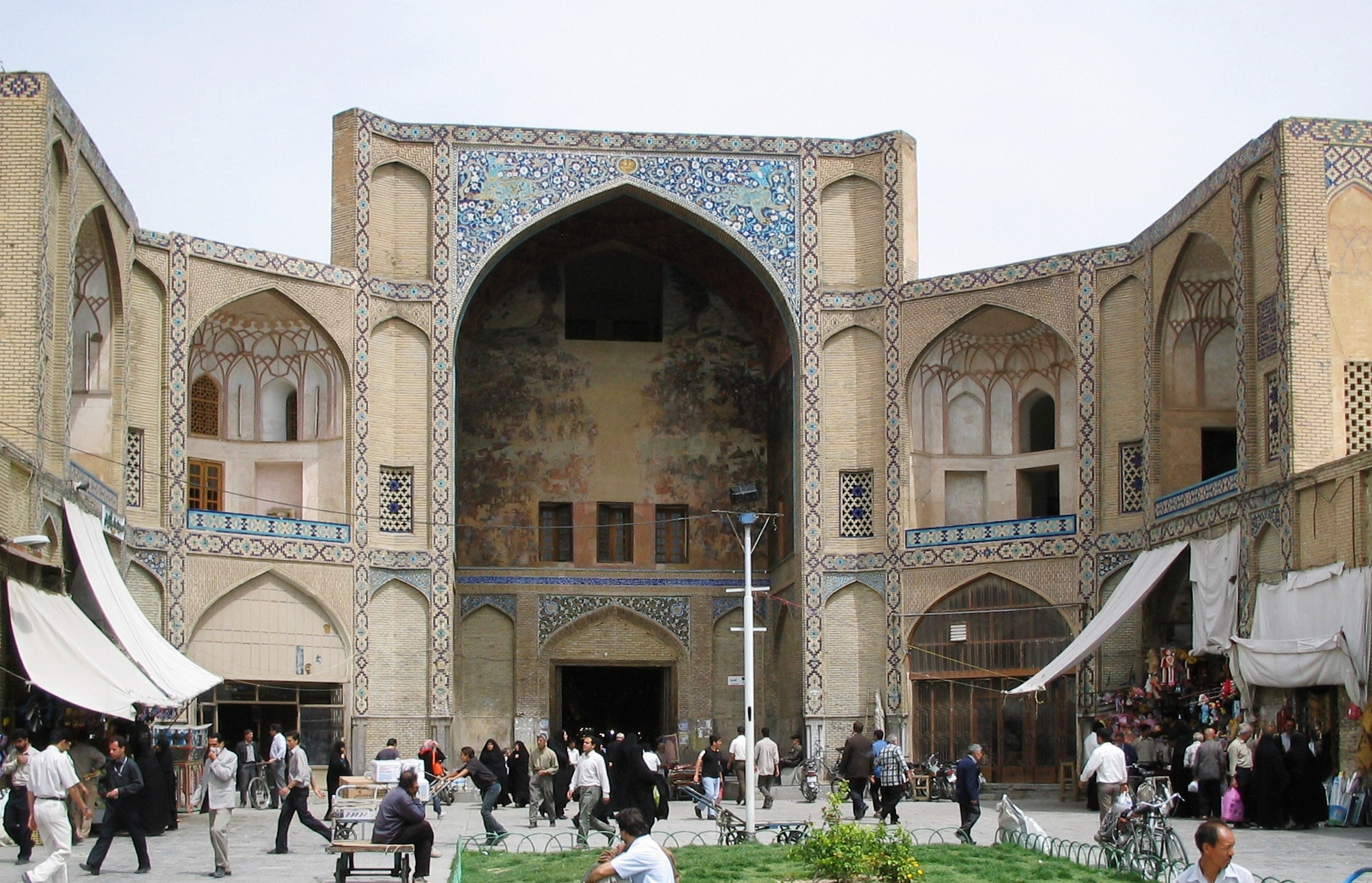
Main entrance of the Isfahan Bazaar

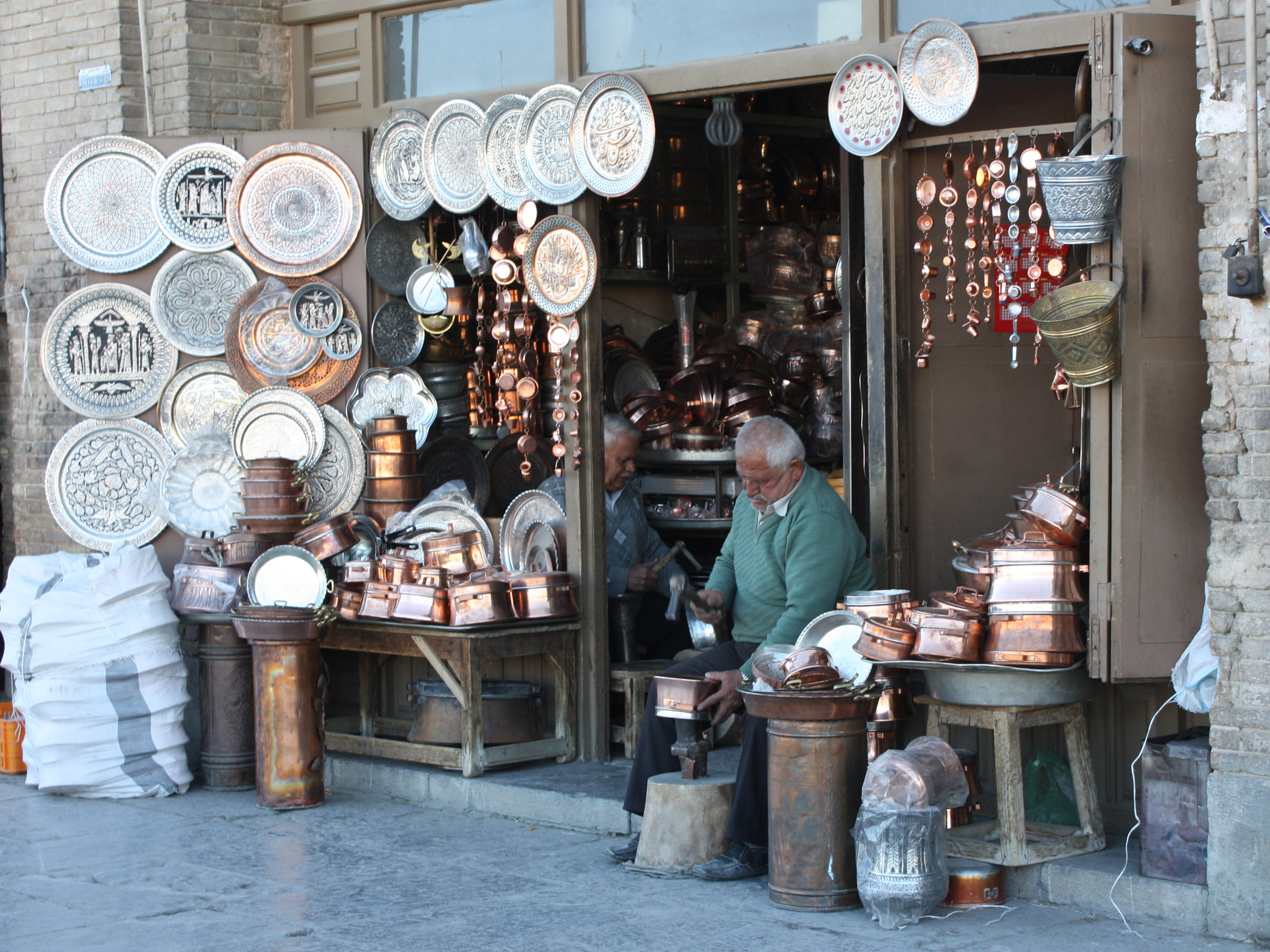
A handicraft-maker-seller

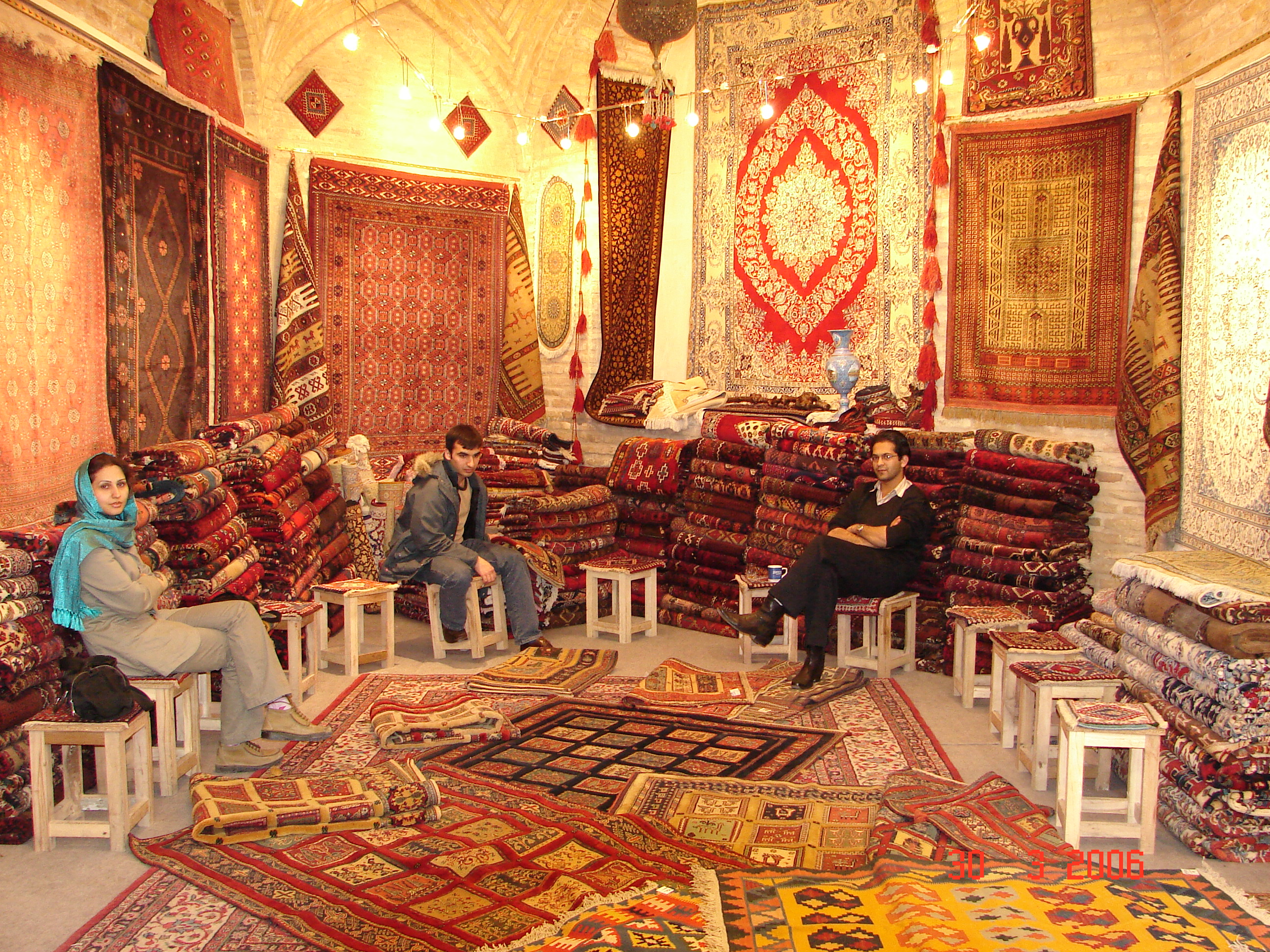
A carpet shop in the Grand Bazaar

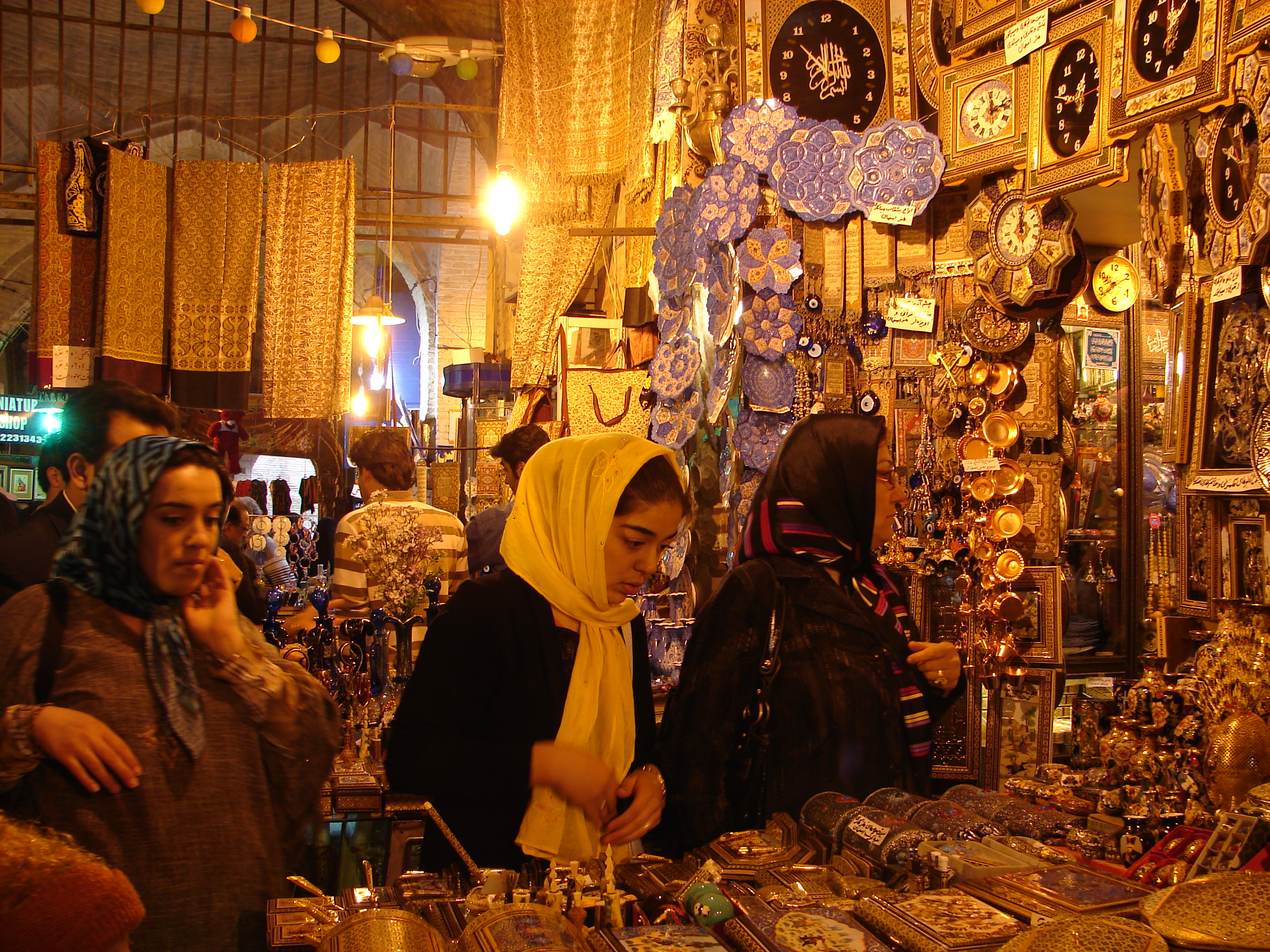
Shoppers in the Grand Bazaar

The Grand Bazaar (Persian: بازار بزرگ, romanized: Bāzār-e Bozorg) also known as the Qeysarriyeh Bazaar (Persian: بازار قیصریه, romanized: Bāzār-e Qeysarriyeh), Qeysarie bazaar or Soltani bazaar is a market located in Isfahan, Iran.

The bazaar was one of the greatest and most luxurious trading centers during the Safavid era. It was built in 1620 on the northern side of Naqsh-e Jahan Square. It connects the Naqsh-e Jahan Square to the Kohneh Square and the Seljuk part of Isfahan.

== History ==
It was originally constructed during the 11th century on the southwest wing of the Jameh Mosque and Kohneh Square, but various arcades and rooms were later added.

The bazaar, one of the oldest and largest in the Middle East, dates to Seljuk and Safavid eras and is the longest roofed market in the world. The site has been destroyed several times before the current bazaar was constructed in the 17th century. The bazaar is a vaulted two-kilometre street linking the old city with the new.

In the Middle-East, bazaars were typically situated in close proximity to the mosque and the Isfahan Bazaar is no exception. The Bazaar of Isfahan is located in downtown old Isfahan, in the northern section of the Naqsh-e Jahan Square. The main entrance called Qeisarieh stretches through to Jameh Mosque, the oldest mosque in Isfahan, and one of the oldest in Iran.

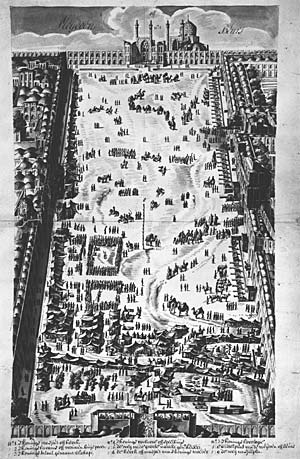
19th-century drawing of Naqsh-e Jahan Square, Isfahan, by French architect Xavier Pascal Coste, who traveled to Iran in 1839.

== Gallery ==
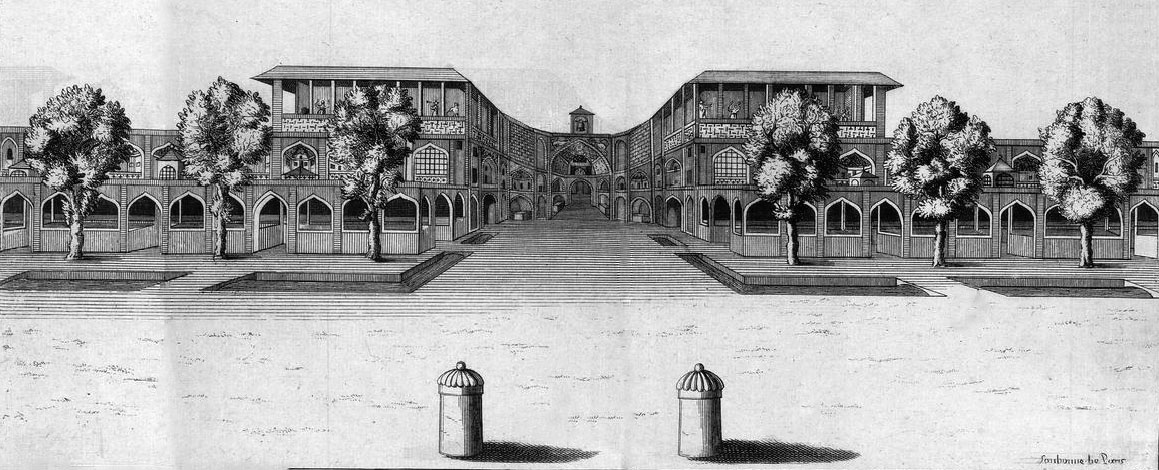
Qeysarieh gate by Jean Chardin, 1705

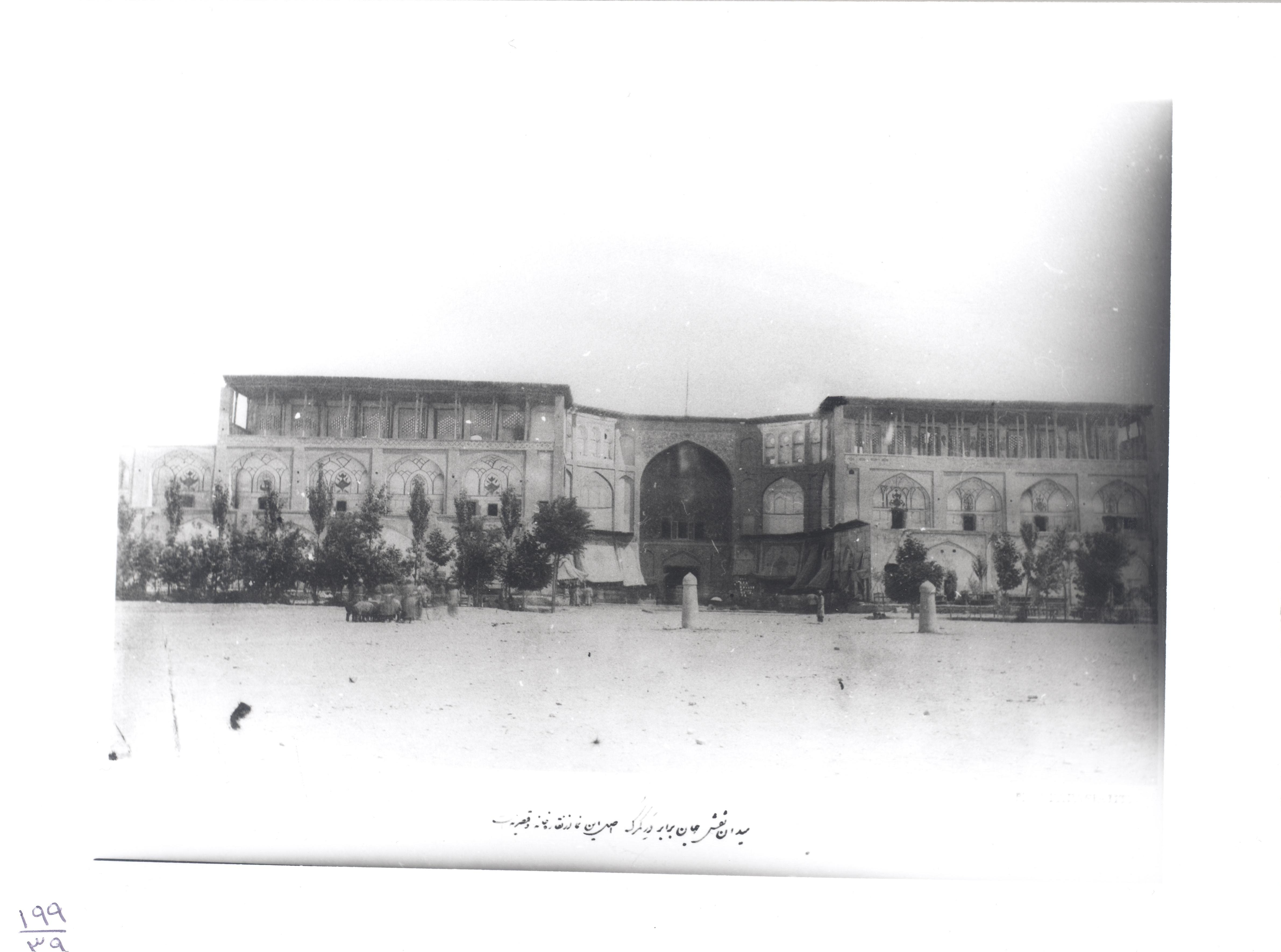
Qeysarieh gate by Joseph Papasian, 19th century

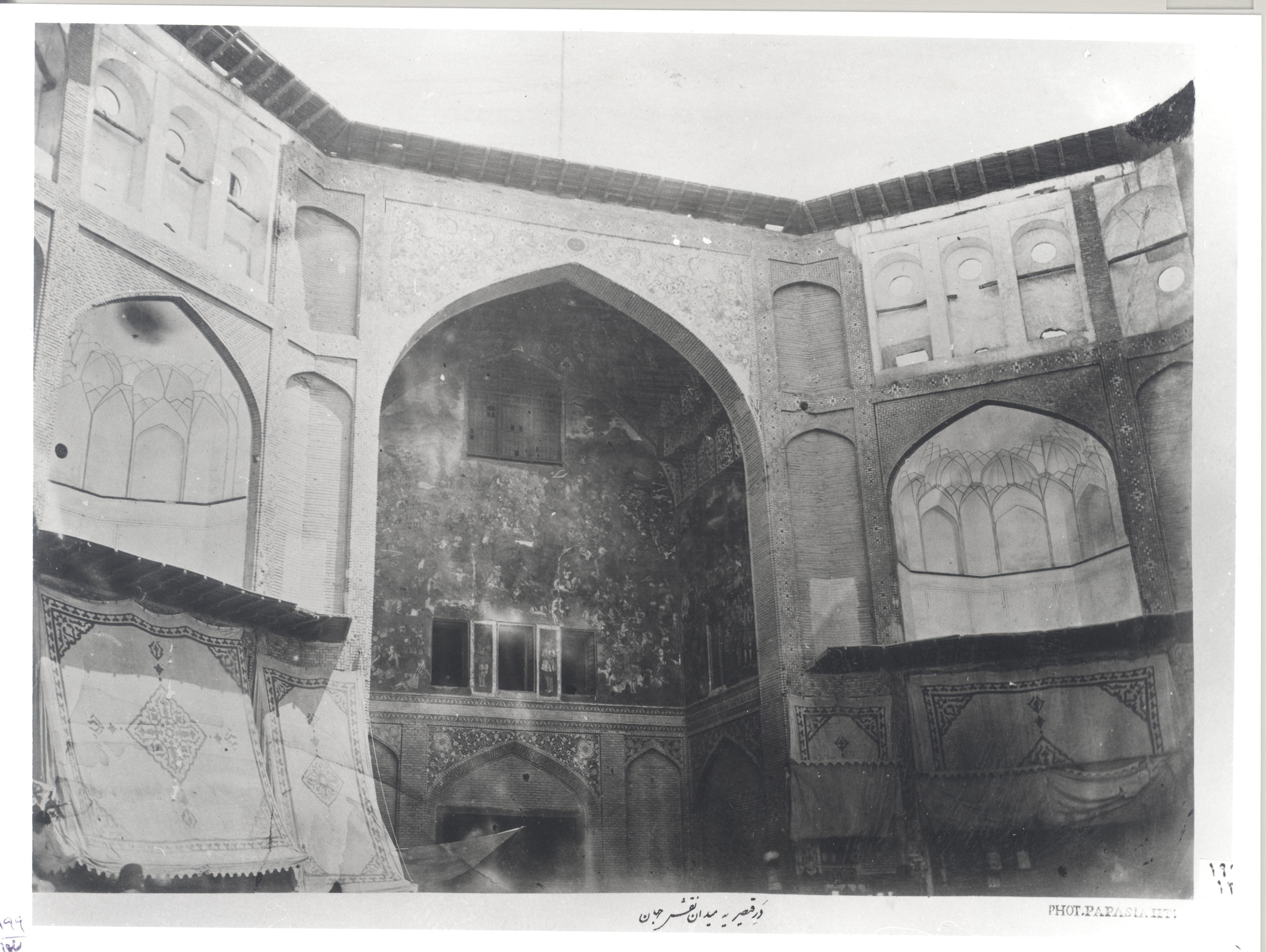
Qeysarieh gate by Joseph Papasian, 19th century

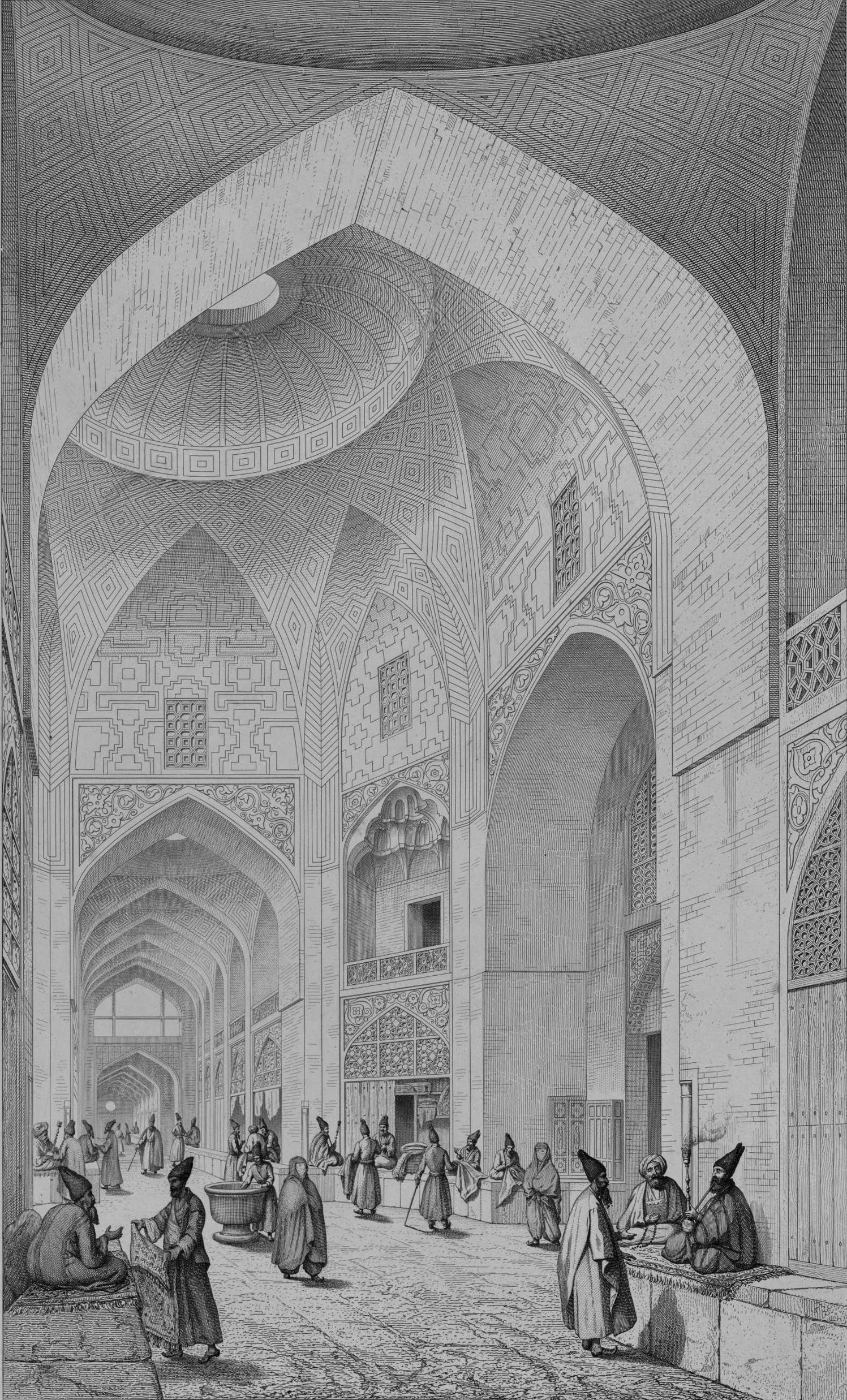
The bazaar by Pascal Coste, 1840

== See also ==
- List of historical structures in Isfahan province

== Bibliography ==
- A. Bakhtiar: ‘The Royal Bazaar of Isfahan’, Studies on Isfahan, ed. R. Holod, 2 vols, Iran. Stud., vii (1974), pp. 320–47
- H. Gaube and E. Wirth: Der Bazar von Isfahan (Wiesbaden: Reichert, 1978) ISBN 9783882260113
- Dehbashi, Ali (2003), Isfahan, Tehran: Gooya House of Culture & Art, ISBN 964-7610-01-7
