= Naqsh-e Jahan Square =

Historical town square in Isfahan, Iran

Naqsh-i Jahan Square
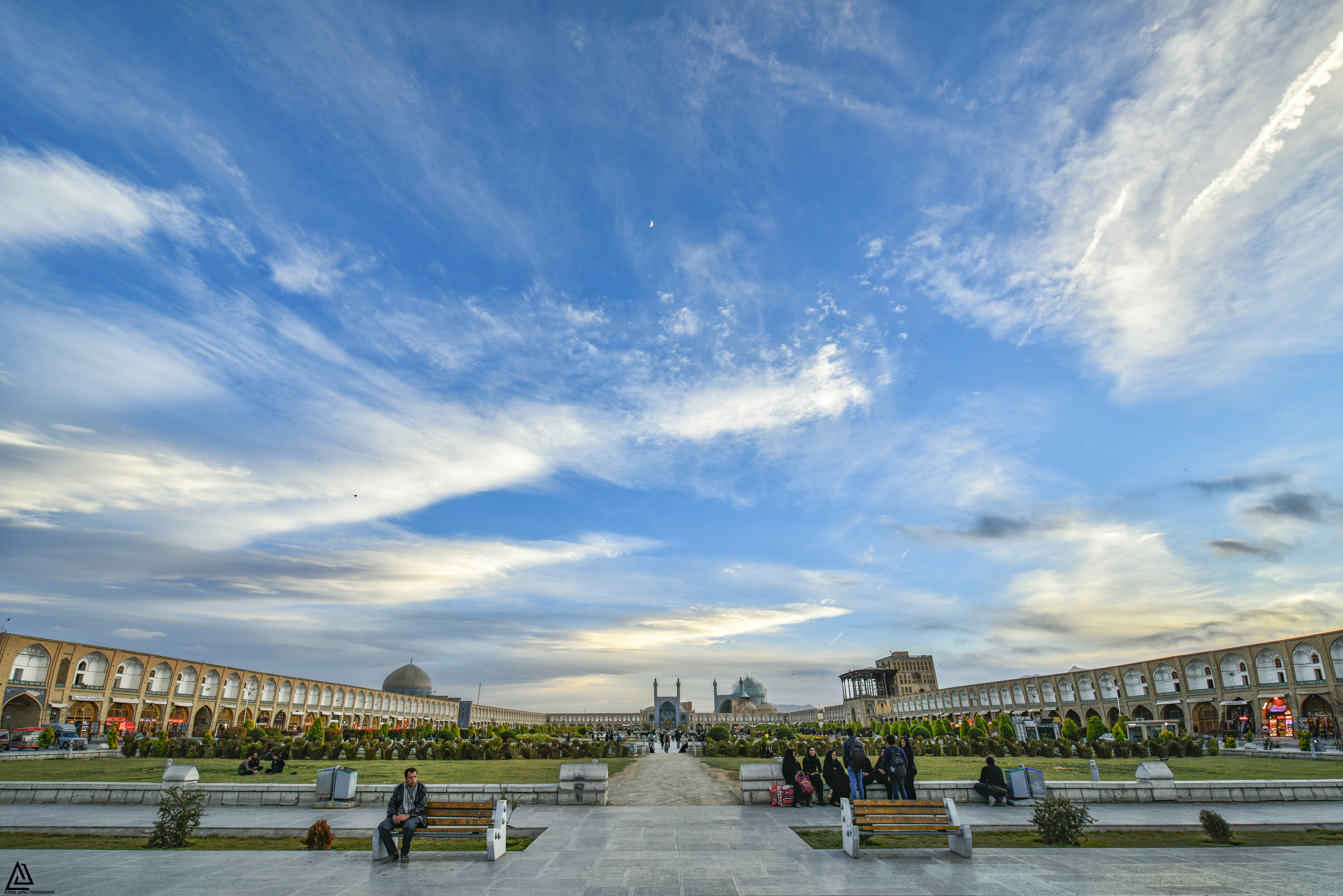

- Location within Iran
- 32°39′27″N 51°40′40″E
- Location: Isfahan, Isfahan Province, Iran

UNESCO World Heritage Site
- Official name: Naqsh-i Jahan Square
- Type: Cultural
- Criteria: i,v, vi
- Designated: 1979 (3rd session)
- Reference no.
- Region: Asia-Pacific

Iran National Heritage List
- Official name: Naqsh-e Jahan Square
- Type: Plaza
- Designated: 1932
- Reference no.: 102
- Conservation organization: Cultural Heritage, Handicrafts and Tourism Organization of Iran

The Naqsh-e Jahan Square (Persian: میدان نقش جهان, romanized: Maidān-e Naqsh-e Jahān, lit. 'Image of the World Square'), also known as the Shah Square (میدان شاه) prior to 1979, and sometimes known as the Imam Square, is a square situated at the center of Isfahan, Iran. Constructed between 1598 and 1629, it is now an important historical site, and one of UNESCO's World Heritage Sites. It is 160 metres (520 ft) wide by 560 metres (1,840 ft) long – an area of 89,600 square metres (964,000 sq ft). The square is surrounded by buildings from the Safavid era. The Shah Mosque is situated on the south side of this square. On the west side is the Ali Qapu Palace. Sheikh Lotfollah Mosque is situated on the eastern side of this square and at the northern side Qeysarie Gate opens into the Isfahan Grand Bazaar. Today, Namaaz-e Jom'eh (the Muslim Friday prayer) is held in the Shah Mosque.

The square is depicted on the reverse of the Iranian 20,000 rials banknote. Stores are owned by trust of Ostandari Isfahan.

== History ==
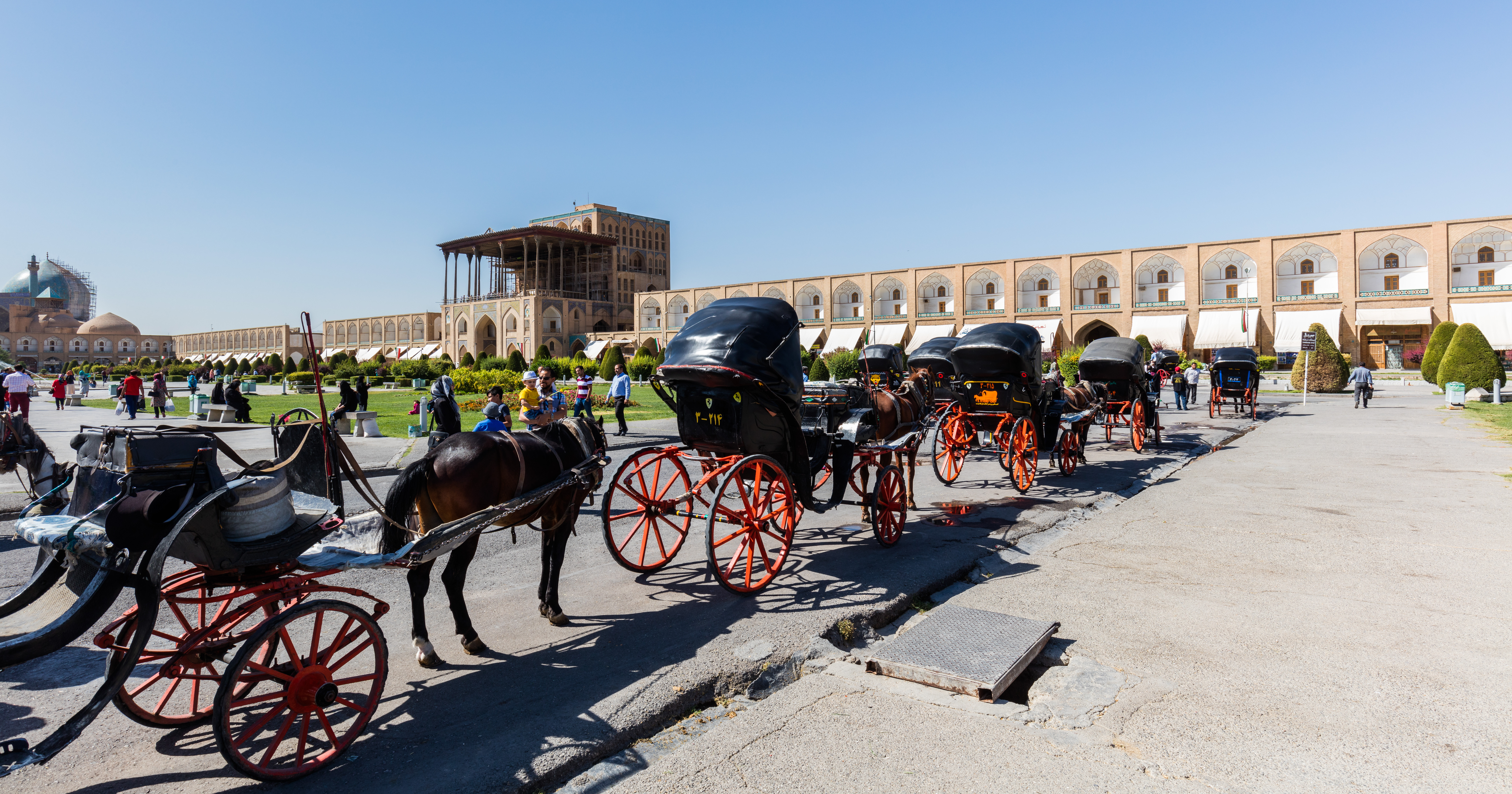
Carriages in the square, 2016

Gerard Hofsted van Essen: Meijdoen or market. Bazaar of Isfahan, bird's-eye view drawing. Leiden University Library, 1703.

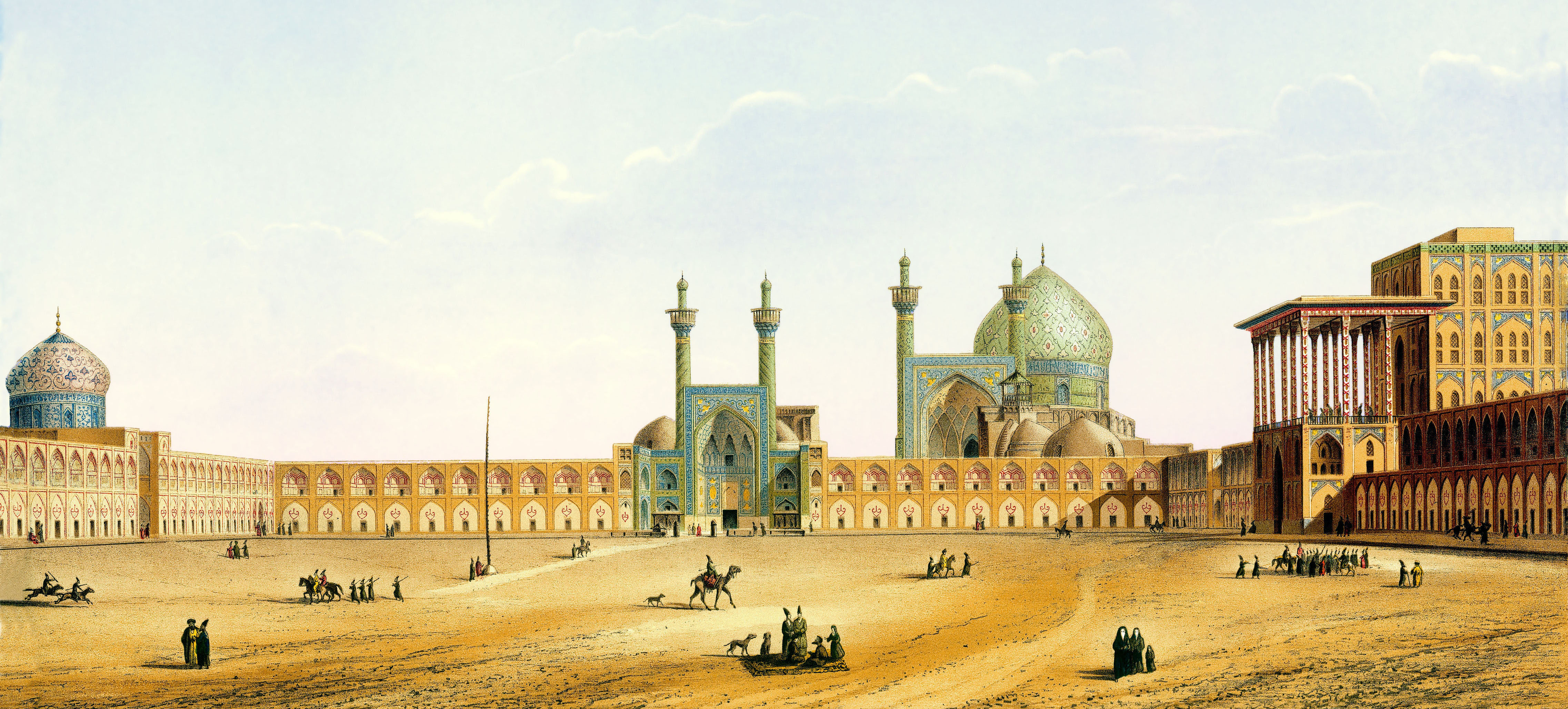
19th-century drawing of Naqsh-e Jahan Square by French architect Xavier Pascal Coste, who traveled to Iran in 1839, 1867

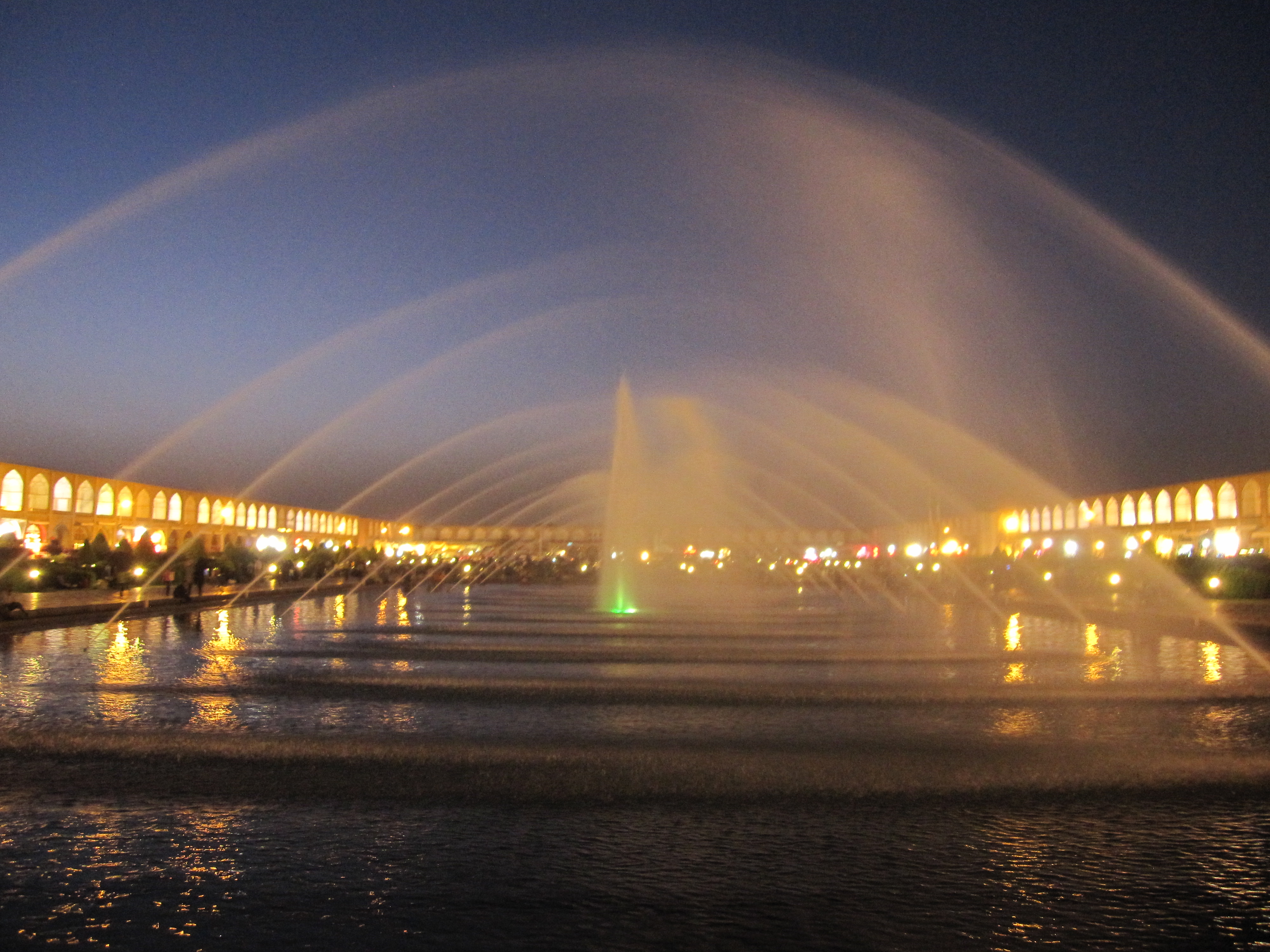
Naqsh-e Jahan at night, 2010

In 1598, when Abbas the Great decided to move the capital of his empire from the north-western city of Qazvin to the central city of Isfahan, he initiated what would become one of the greatest programmes in Iranian history: the complete remaking of the city. By choosing the central city of Isfahan, with the Zāyande roud ("The life-giving river"), lying as an oasis of intense cultivation in the midst of a vast area of arid landscape, he distanced his capital from any future assaults by the Ottomans, the arch rival of the Safavids, and the Uzbeks, and at the same time gained more control over the Persian Gulf, which had recently become an important trading route for the Dutch and British East India Companies.

The chief architect of this colossal task of urban planning was Shaykh Bahai (Baha' ad-Din al-'Amili), who focused the programme on two key features of Shah Abbas's master plan: the Chaharbagh avenue, flanked at either side by all the prominent institutions of the city, such as the residences of all foreign dignitaries, and the Naqsh-e Jahan Square ("Exemplar of the World"). Prior to the shah's ascent to power, Iran had a decentralised power-structure, in which different institutions battled for power, including both the military (the Qizilbash) and governors of the different provinces making up the empire. Abbas wanted to undermine this political structure, and the recreation of Isfahan, as a Grand capital of Iran, was an important step in centralising the power.

== Maidan – The Royal Square ==
The Maidan was where the shah and the people met. During the day, much of the square was occupied by the tents and stalls of tradesmen, who paid a weekly rental to the government. There were also entertainers and actors. For the hungry, there were readily available cooked foods or slices of melon, while cups of water were handed out for free by water-carriers paid for by the shop-keepers. At the entrance to the Imperial Bazaar, there were coffee-houses, where people could relax over a cup of fresh coffee and a water-pipe. These shops can still be found today, although the drink in fashion for the past century has been tea, rather than coffee. At dusk, the shop-keepers packed up, and the huzz and buzz of tradesmen and eager shoppers bargaining over the prices of goods would be given over to dervishes, mummers, jugglers, puppet-players, acrobats and prostitutes.

When Italian traveler Pietro Della Valle visited Isfahan in 1617, he described the square as "without doubt superior to everything in Constantinople or wheresoever in Christendom," recording its appearance towards the end of its construction in his travelogue:

"[The Maidan] is completely surrounded by finely designed symmetrical buildings, uninterrupted either by streets or anything else, made with large porticoes and floors underneath for shops with diverse merchandise set out in order from place to place; and above, with balconies and windows, filled with a thousand pretty ornaments. This harmony of architecture on so large a scale is so agreeable to the eye that, though the houses of Piazza Navona are higher and more richly decorated in our way, ... I dare to place [the Maidan] before the Piazza Navona. Around the Maidan, on all four sides, not far from the porticoes, flows a big channel of water, beautifully straight, lined with parapets, and accompanied on the inside by a very smooth promenade made of stone. And beyond the flowing water, towards the porticoes, extends a very dense and even row of green trees, which, when they put forth their foliage in a few days' time, will I believe be the most beautiful sight in the world."

— Pietro Della Valle, Travels of Pietro Della Valle

Every now and then the square would be cleared off for public ceremonies and festivities. One such occasion would be the annual event of Nowruz, the Persian New Year. Also, the national Persian sport of polo could be played in the maidan, providing the Shah, residing in the Ali Qapu palace, and the busy shoppers with some entertainment.

Under Abbas, Isfahan became a very cosmopolitan city, with a resident population of Turks, Georgians, Armenians, Indians, Chinese and a growing number of Europeans. Abbas brought in some 300 Chinese artisans to work in the royal workshops and to teach the art of porcelain-making. The Indians were present in very large numbers, housed in the many caravanserais that were dedicated to them, and they mainly worked as merchants and money-changers. The Europeans were there as merchants, Roman Catholic missionaries, artists and craftsmen. Even soldiers, usually with expertise in artillery, would make the journey from Europe to Iran to make a living. The Portuguese ambassador, De Gouvea, once stated that:

"The people of Isfahan are very open in their dealings with foreigners, having to deal every day with people of several other nations."

— García de Silva Figueroa

Also, many historians have wondered about the peculiar orientation of the maidān. Unlike most buildings of importance, this square did not lie in alignment with Mecca, so that when entering the entrance-portal of the Shah Mosque, one makes, almost without realising it, the half-right turn which enables the main court within to face Mecca. Donald Wilber gives the most plausible explanation to this; the vision of Shaykh Bahai was for the mosque to be visible wherever in the maydān a person was situated. Had the axis of the maydān coincided with the axis of Mecca, the dome of the mosque would have been concealed from view by the towering entrance-portal leading to it. By creating an angle between them, the two parts of the building, the entrance-portal and the dome, are in perfect view for everyone within the square to admire.

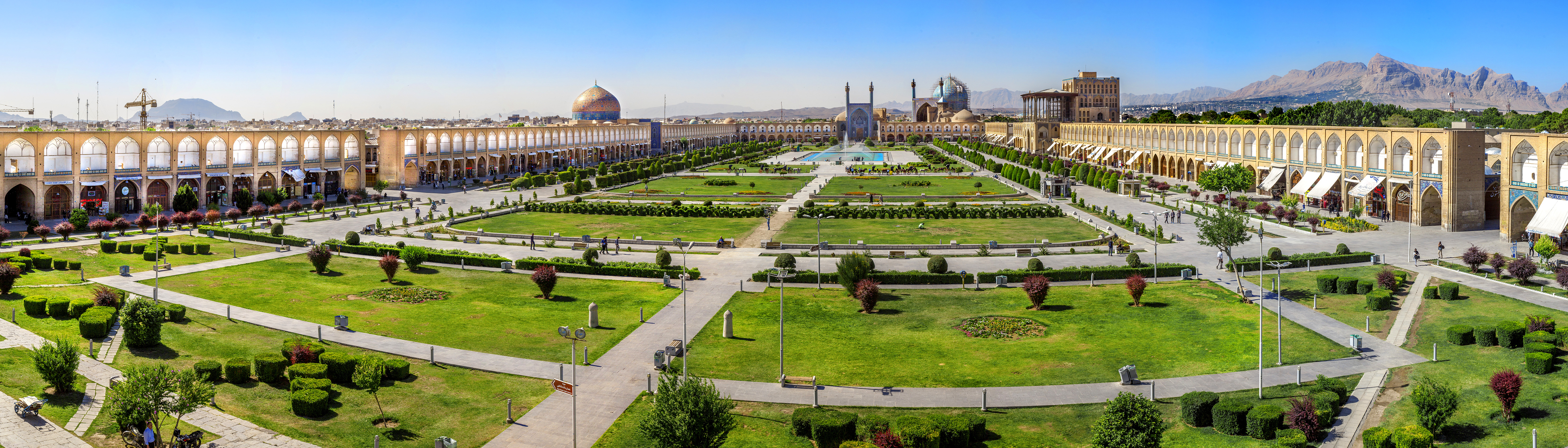
Naqsh-e Jahān Square: Sheikh Lotfollah Mosque (left), Shah Mosque (center) and Ali Qapu Palace (right), 2020
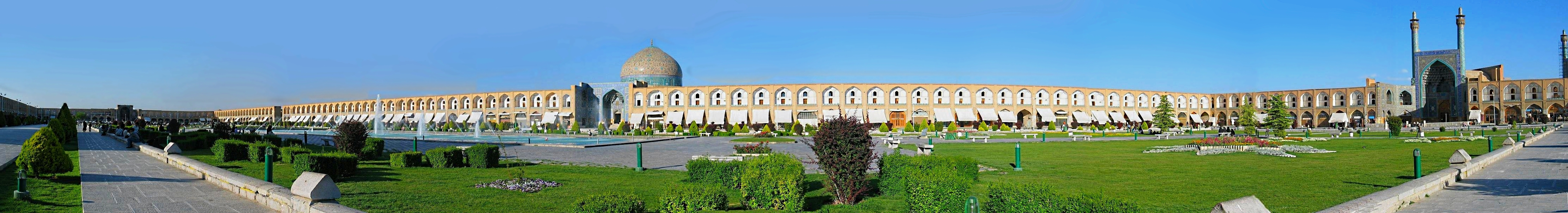
Panoramic view, 2007 or earlier.

The Shah Mosque, 2009

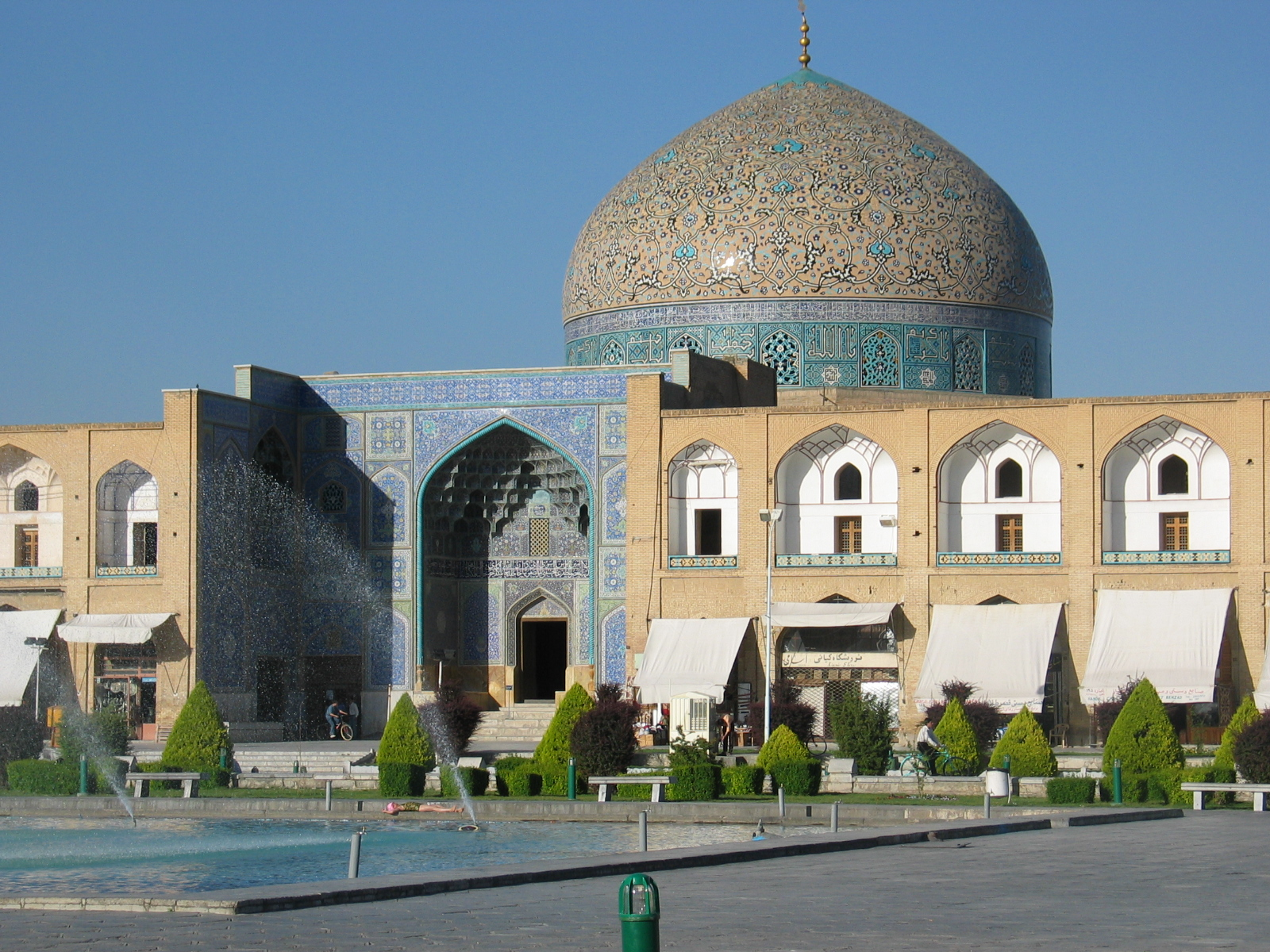
The Lotfollah Mosque had a secret entrance that spanned underneath the Maidan, from the Palace on the opposite side of the square, 2003

=== Masjed-e Shah – The Pinnacle of Safavid Architecture ===
The Crown Jewel in the Naqsh-e Jahan Square was the Masjed-e Shah, which would replace the much older Jameh Mosque in conducting the Friday prayers. To achieve this, the Shah Mosque was constructed not only with vision of grandeur, having the largest dome in the city, but Shaykh Bahai also planned the construction of a religious school and a winter-mosque clamped at either side of it.

=== The Sheikh Lotfollah Mosque ===
Of the four monuments that dominated the perimeter of the Naqsh-e Jahan square, the Lotfollah Mosque, opposite the palace, was the first to be built. The purpose of this mosque was for it to be a private mosque of the royal court, unlike the Masjed-e Shah, which was meant for the public.

=== Ali Qapu Palace ===
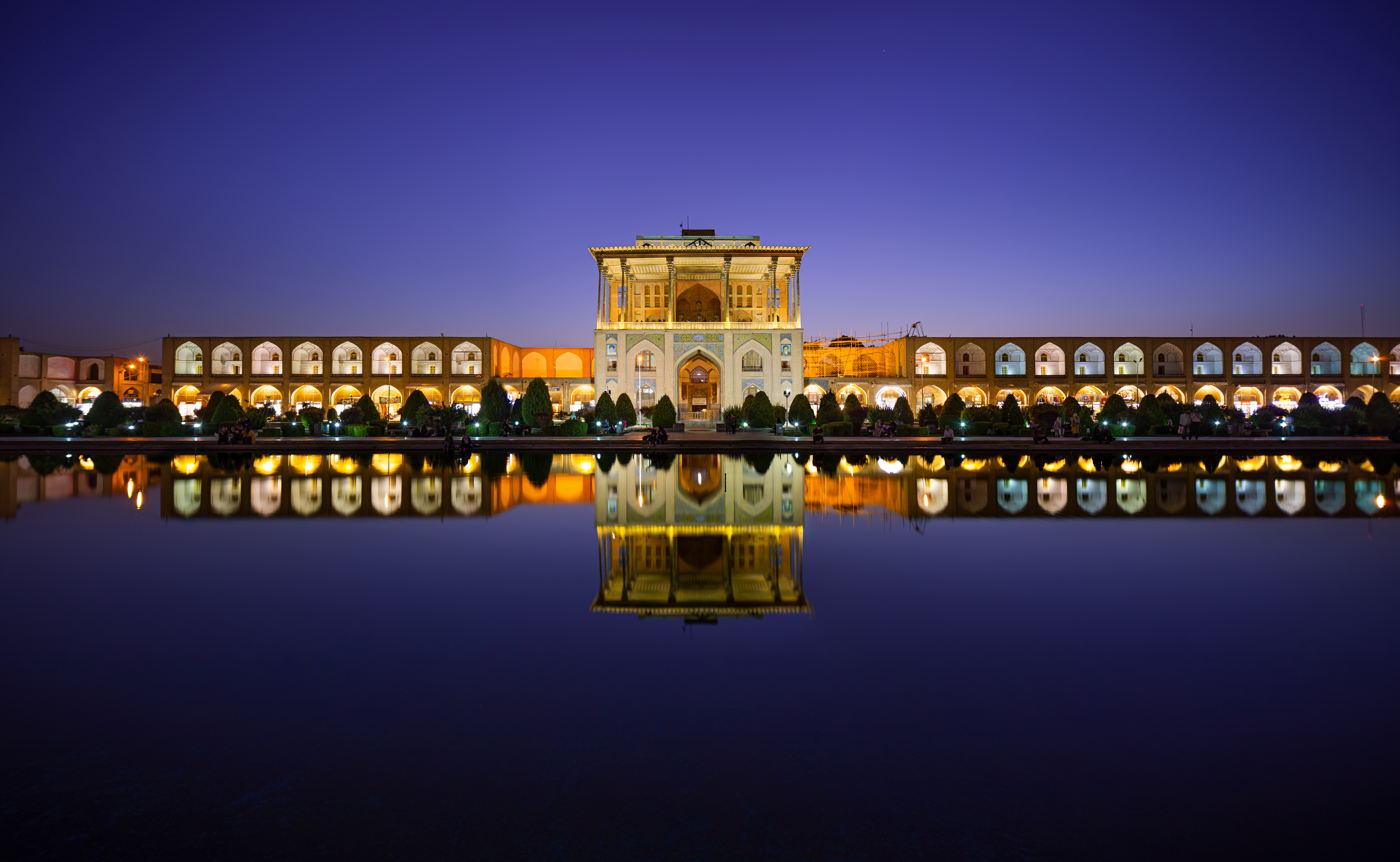
Ālī Qāpū at night, 2019

Ālī Qāpū (IPA: ɑliː qɑpuː) is a pavilion that marks the entrance to the vast royal residential quarter of Safavid Isfahan which stretched from the Maidan Naqsh-e Jahan to the Chahar Bagh Boulevard. The name is made of two elements: "Ali", Arabic for exalted, and "Qapu", Turkic for portal or royal threshold, resulting in the translation "Exalted Porte".

On the sixth floor, the royal reception and banquets were held. The largest rooms are found on this floor. The stucco decoration of the banquet hall abounds in motif of various vessels and cups. The sixth floor was popularly called the music room as it was here that various ensembles performed music and sang songs. From the upper galleries, the Safavid shahs watched polo games, maneuvers and horse-racing below in the Naqsh-e Jahan square.

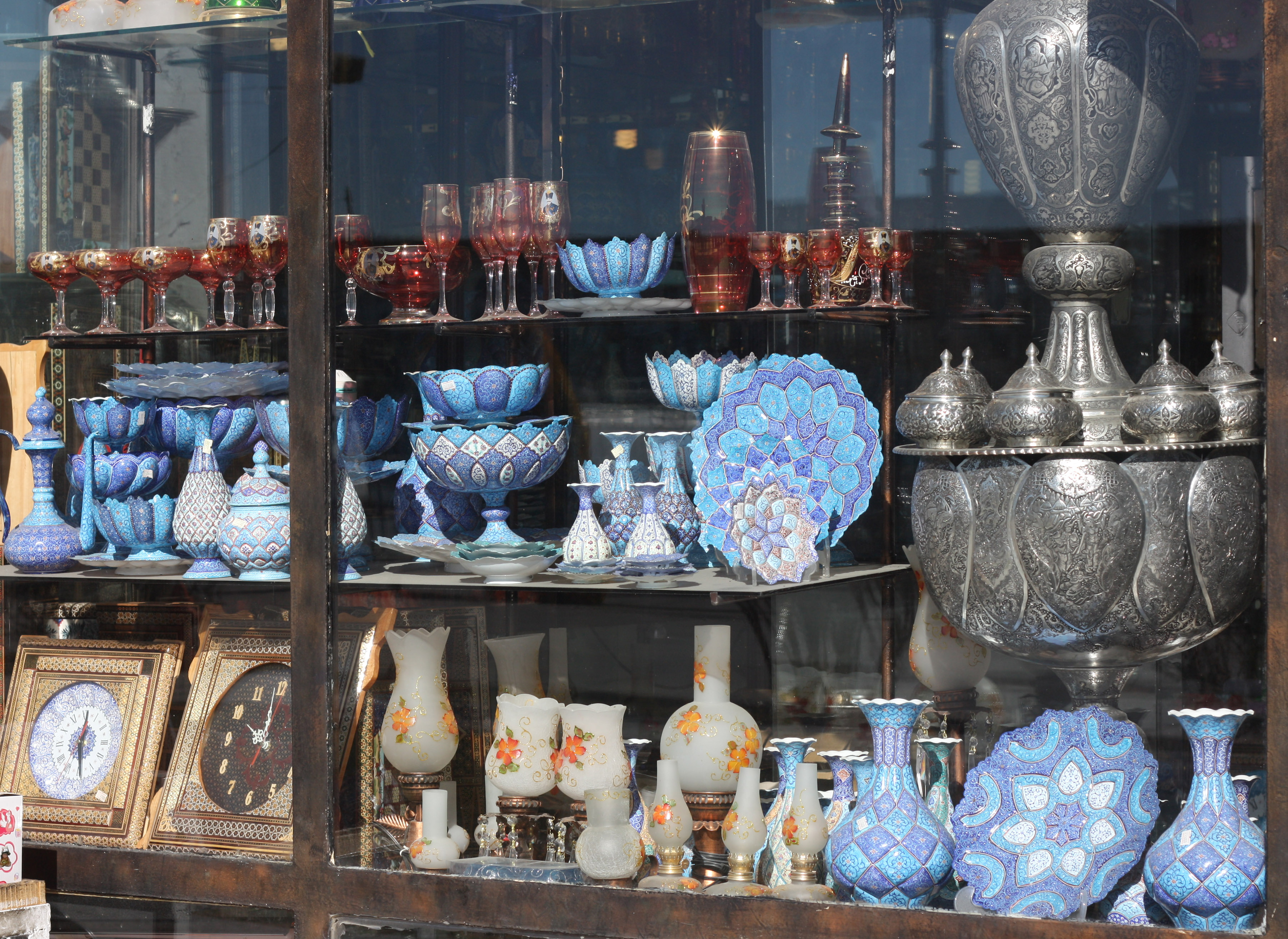
A handicraft shop at bazar, 2012

=== The Imperial Bazaar ===
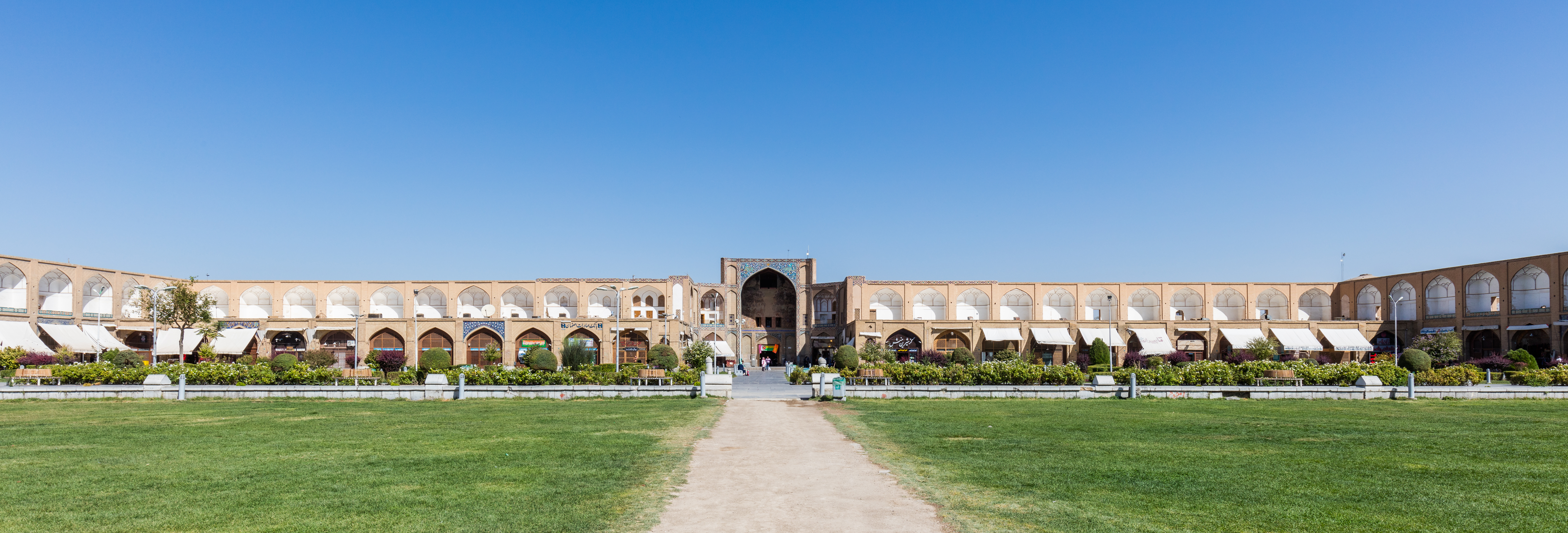
Bazaar entrance (Qeysarriyeh gate), 2016

The Grand Bazaar of Isfahan is a historic market and one of the oldest and largest bazaars in the Middle East. Although the present structure dates back to the Safavid era, parts of it are more than a thousand years old, dating back to the Seljuk era. It is a vaulted, two kilometer street linking the old city with the new.

== UNESCO ==
Naqsh-e Jahan Square is one of UNESCO's World Heritage Sites.

== See also ==
- Ganjali Khan Complex
- Iranian architecture
- List of city squares by size
- Naqsh-e Jahan derby
- Safavid architecture
- List of World Heritage Sites in Iran

== Sources ==
- Galdieri, E.; Orazi, R. (1969). Progetto di sistemazione del Maydan-i Šāh (in Italian). Rome.
- Galdieri, E. (1970). Two Building Phases of the Time of Šāh 'Abbas I in the Maydān-i Šāh of Isfahan: Preliminary Note. Vol. xx. E. & W., n. s. pp. 60–69.
- Galdieri, E. (1987). "Esfahan e la Domus Spectaculi Automatorum". Proceedings of the First European Conference of Iranian Studies (in Italian). Vol. ii. Turin: Societas Iranologica Europaea. pp. 377–88.
- Jabalameli, A. (2000). Meidan Eman en Isfahán. Vol. xix. Patrimonio Mundial. pp. 20–31.
- Luschey, H. (1979). Der königliche Marstall in Iṣfahān und Engelbert Kaempfers Planographia des Palastbezirkes 1712 (in German). Vol. xvii. Iran. pp. 71–9.
- Rothman, E. Nathalie (2015). Brokering Empire: Trans-Imperial Subjects between Venice and Istanbul. Cornell University Press. ISBN 978-0801463129.
