= Yeni Həyat =

Yeni Həyat may refer to:

- Yeni Həyat, Khachmaz, Azerbaijan
- Yeni Həyat, Qusar, Azerbaijan
- Yeni Həyat, Shamkir, Azerbaijan
