= M1 highway (Azerbaijan) =

Highway in Azerbaijan

M1 highway
- M 1 şossesi

Route information
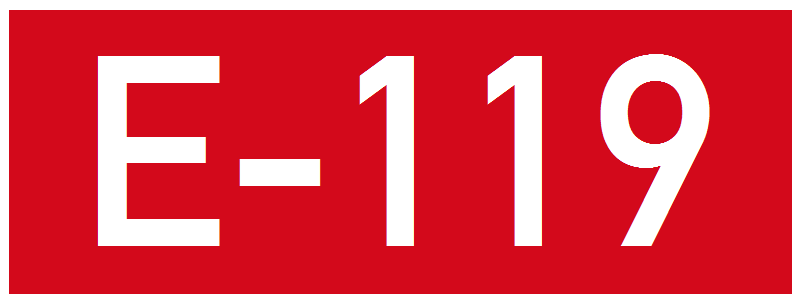
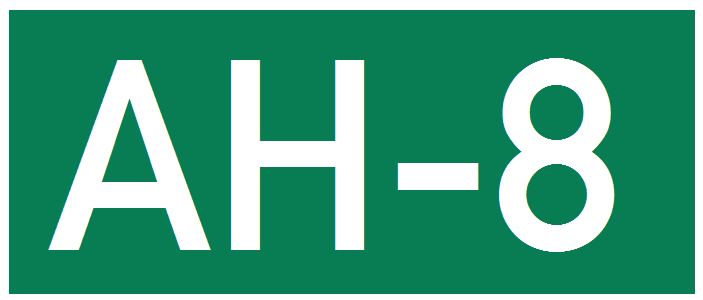
- Part of E119 / AH8
- Length: 203 km (126 mi)

Major junctions
- North end: R 217 at Samur-Yarag-Kazmalyar
- R 5 near Yeni Həyat; R 3 in Qırmızı Qəsəbə; R 4 in Timiryazev; R 1 in Gəndov; R 7 near Sumqayit; R 6 in Sumqayit; R 7 in Sumqayit; M 4 in Baku
- South end: Füzuli Küçəsi in Baku

Location
- Country: Azerbaijan

Highway system
- Roads in Azerbaijan

The M1 is a 203 km (126 mi) long highway running across the Azeri coast. The route runs from the border of Russia to Baku. Near Baku the road is a motorway. The entire route is part of the European route E119 and Asian Highway AH8.
