= European route E591 =

Road in trans-European E-road network

E591

Major junctions
- From: Novorossiysk
- To: Rostov-on-Don

Location
- Countries: Russia

Highway system
- International E-road network; A Class; B Class

E 591 is a European B class road in Russia, connecting Novorossiysk to European route E115 south of Rostov-on-Don.

== Route ==
- A 290: Novorossiysk - Verkhnebakanskiy
- A 146: Verkhnebakanskiy - Krasnodar
- M 4: Krasnodar - Rostov-on-Don
