= Mount Kop Tunnel =

Road tunnel in Turkey

Mount Kop Tunnel Kop Dağı Tüneli
- Interactive map of Mount Kop Tunnel; Kop Dağı Tüneli

Overview
- Location: Kop Pass, Maden, Bayburt-Aşkale, Erzurum, Turkey
- Coordinates: 40°02′15″N 40°29′19″E
- Status: Under construction
- Route: D.915 E97

Operation
- Work began: 23 August 2012
- Opened: End 2015
- Owner: General Directorate of Highways
- Traffic: automotive
- Character: Twin-tube tunnel

Technical
- Length: 6,500 m (21,300 ft)
- Max elevation: 2,050 m (6,730 ft)

Location of Mt. Kop Tunnel in Turkey

Mount Kop Tunnel (Turkish: Kop Dağı Tüneli) is a road tunnel under construction located on the province border of Bayburt and Erzurum as part of the route D.915 E97 between Maden, Bayburt in the northwest and Aşkale, Erzurum in the southeast in Eastern Anatolia region, Turkey.

Situated on the Mount Kop of Pontic Mountains, it is a 6,500 m (21,300 ft)-long twin-tube tunnel. The cost of the construction is estimated to be ₺319 million.

It was built to bypass the Kop Pass at 2,409 m (7,904 ft) elevation with hairpin turns. The tunnel will also eliminate the four-month-long traffic inaccessibility during the winter months due to harsh climatic conditions by heavy snow fall, icing and fog. It will shorten the route about 6 km (3.7 mi) and reduce the travel time to one hour. The tunnel is situated at 2,050 m (6,730 ft) elevation.

The groundbreaking ceremony was held in presence of Minister of Transport, Maritime and Communication Binali Yıldırım on 23 August 2012. Excavation works progress about 20 m (66 ft) daily in each tunnel tube. Opening of the tunnel is scheduled end of 2015.Currently, 150 personnel are at work.
