= AH8 =

Road in Asia

Asian Highway 8
- Map of AH8 in red

Route information
- Length: 4,907 km (3,049 mi)

Major junctions
- North end: Torfyanovka, Russia
- South end: Bandar-e Emam Khomeyni, Iran

Location
- Countries: Russia; Azerbaijan; Iran

Highway system
- Asian Highway Network
← AH7	→ AH9

Asian Highway 8 (AH8) is a road in the Asian Highway Network running 4907 km (3050 miles) from Torfyanovka, Russia to Bandar-e Emam Khomeini, Iran. The route is as follows:

== Russia ==
- A 181 / E18: (Finland E18) - Torfyanovka - Vyborg - Saint Petersburg
- M 10 / E105 (or M 11): Saint Petersburg - Moscow
- M 4 / E119: Moscow - Kashira
- R 22 / E119: Kashira - Tambov-Borisoglesk( E38) - Volgograd (Start of Concurrency E40) - Astrakhan(End Of Concurrency E40)
- R 215 / E119: Astrakhan ( E40) - Kochubey - Kizlyar - Babayurt
- R 217 / E119: Babayurt - Khasavyurt - Mahachkala ( E50) - Yarag-Kazmalyar (border with Azerbaijan)

A little different route from E119 is, that E119 has bypassed Babayurt, but AH8 continue runs through it.

== Azerbaijan ==
- M 1: (border with Russia) Samur - Sumgayit - Baku
- Baku Ring Highway: Baku
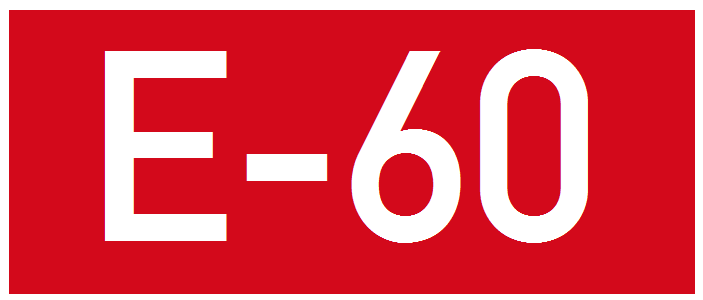
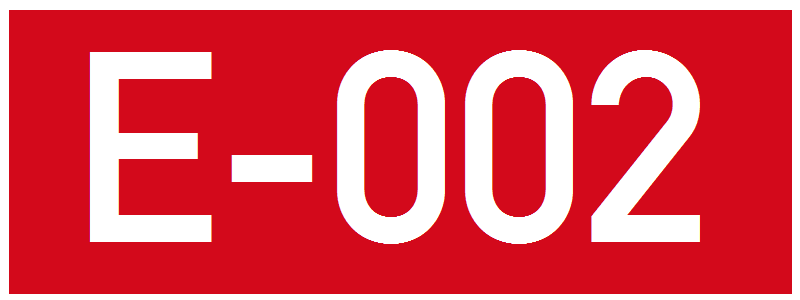
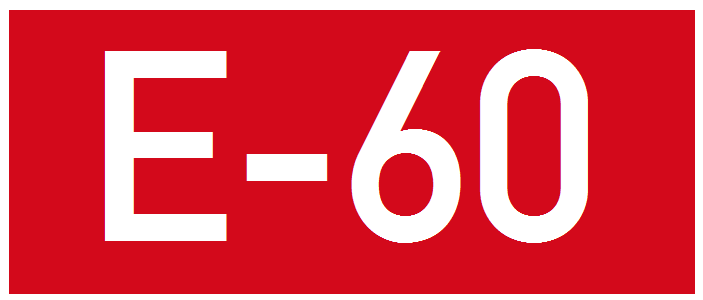
- M 2: Baku (Start of Concurrency with E60) - Ələt ( E002, End of Concurrency with E60)
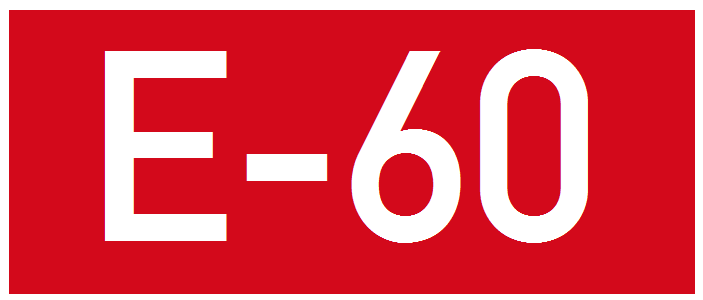
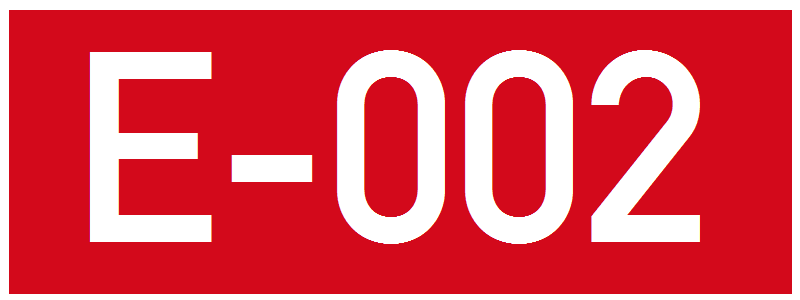
- M 3: Ələt ( E60 E002) - Biləsuvar - Astara (End of Concurrency with European Routes)

== Iran ==
- Road 49 : Astara - Rasht
- Freeway 1: Rasht - Qazvin
- Freeway 2: Qazvin - Tehran
- Freeway 5: Tehran - Saveh - Salafchegan
- Road 56 Road 56: Salafchegan - Arak - Borujerd
- Freeway 5: Borujerd - Khorramabad - Andimeshk
- Road 37 Road 37: Andimeshk - Ahvaz
- Freeway 5: Ahvaz - Bandar-e Emam Khomeyni
- (When sections under construction are completed: Freeway 5: Tehran - Saveh - Salafchegan - Arak - Borujerd - Khorramabad - Andimeshk - Ahvaz - Bandar-e Emam Khomeyni)
