= R217 highway (Russia) =

Road in Russia

Federal Highway R217
- Федеральная автомобильная дорога Р217
- Caucasus Highway
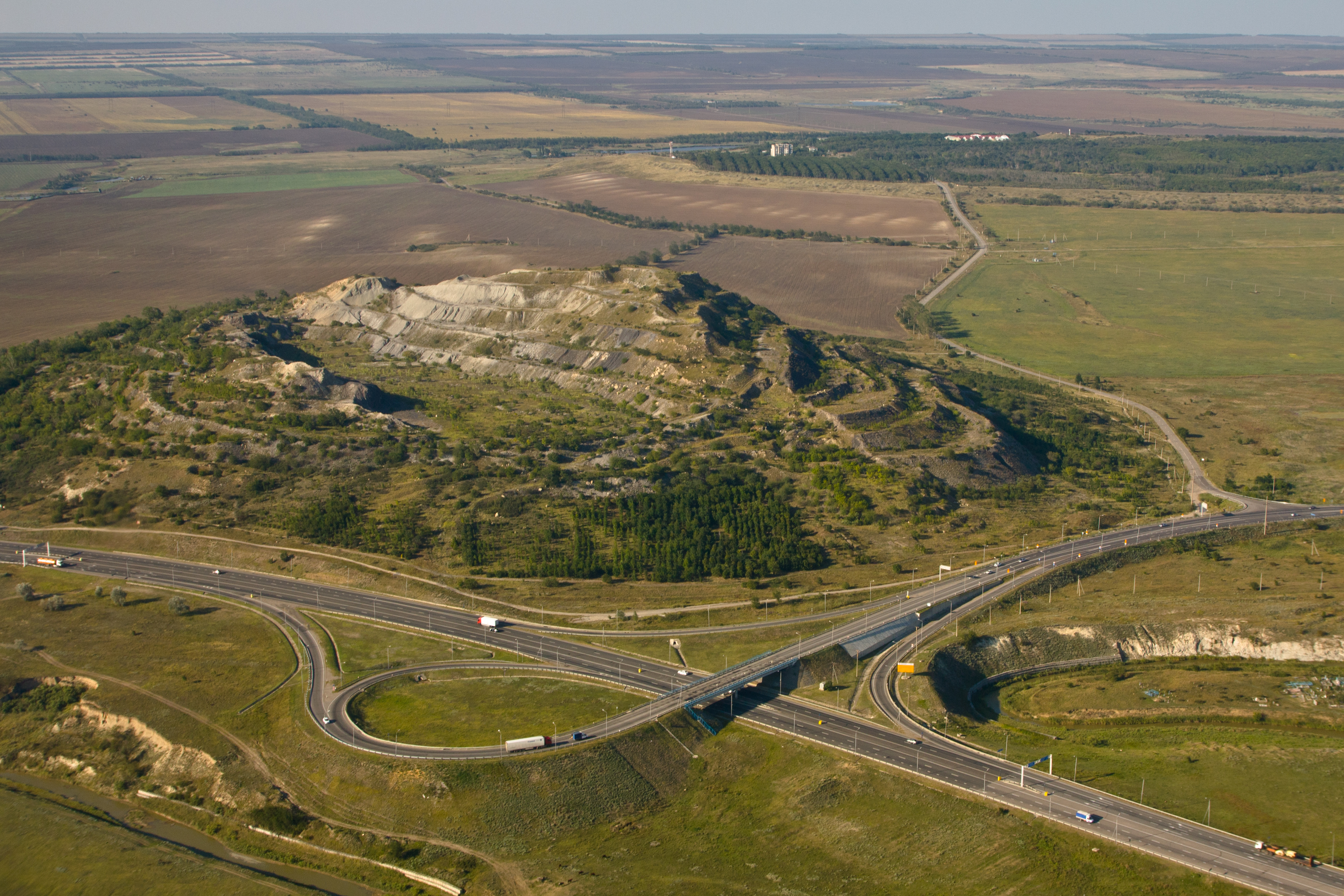

Route information
- Part of E50 E117 E119

- Part of AH8
- Length: 1,118 km (695 mi)
- History: Formerly M29 before 2018

Major junctions
- North end: M 4 near Pavlovskaya
- South end: Azeri border near Yarag-Kazmalyar

Location
- Country: Russia

Highway system
- Russian Federal Highways

The Russian route R217, also known as the Caucasus Highway, is a trunk road that extends from Krasnodar to Chechnya and Dagestan. The route crosses through the federal subjects of Dagestan, Chechnya, Ingushetia, North Ossetia, Kabardino-Balkaria and Stavropol Krai. terminating at Russia's border with Azerbaijan. Its length is 1118 km. The route is part of European route E50 from Pavlovskaya to Makhachkala, European route E117 from Mineralnye Vody to Beslan, and European route E119 from Makhachkala to the Azeri border. The portion from Khasavyurt to the Azeri border is also part of AH8. Before 2018 the route was designated M29.

Major towns along the road include Kropotkin, Nevinnomyssk, Mineralnye Vody, Pyatigorsk, Nalchik, Beslan, Grozny, Gudermes, Khasavyurt, Makhachkala, and Derbent. After skirting the Greater Caucasus, the route continues as the M1 to Baku.

== Route Description ==
Much of the route has been upgraded to a four lane divided highway including most portions that travel through rural areas.

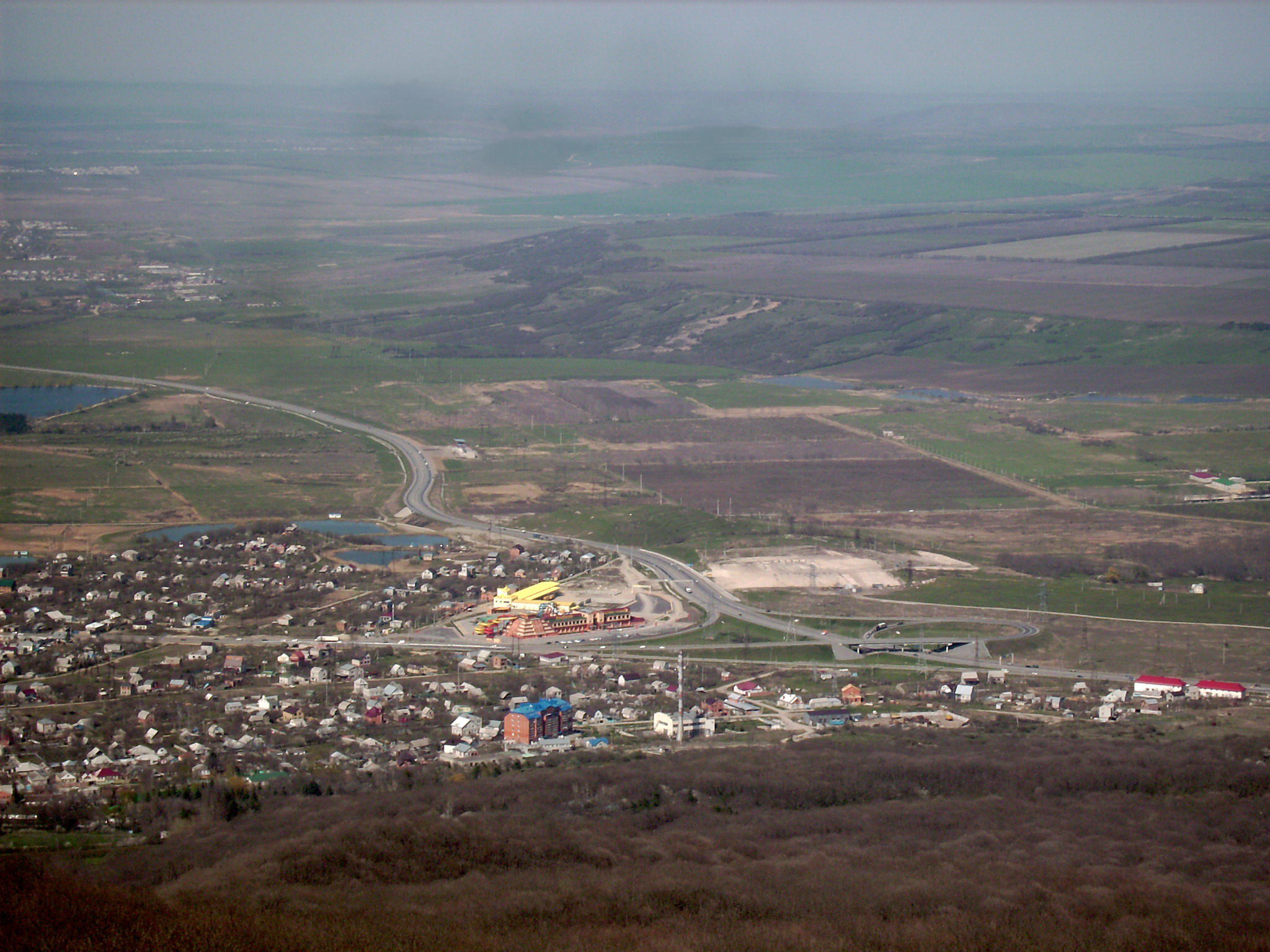
The route near Pyatigorsk as seen from Mount Mashuk
