= A147 highway (Russia) =

Road in Russia

Federal Highway A147
- Федеральная автомобильная дорога А147
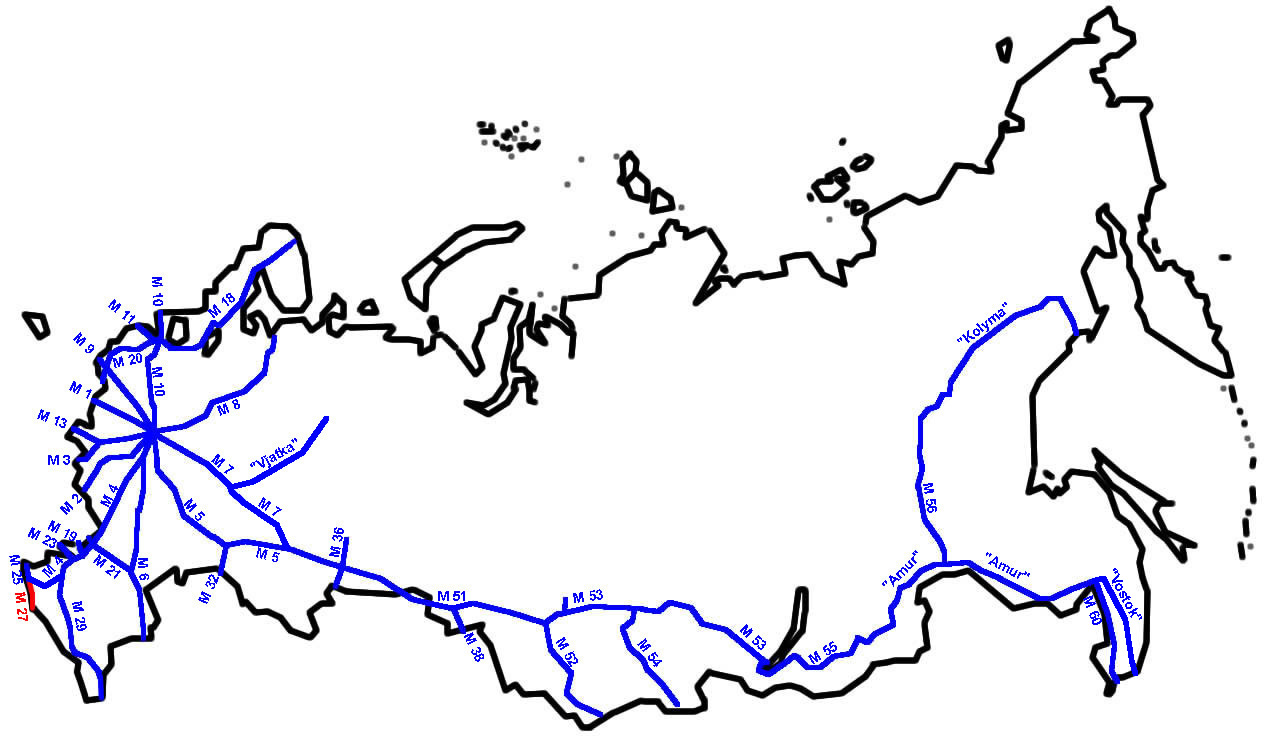

Route information
- Part of E97
- Length: 217 km (135 mi)

Major junctions
- West end: M 4 north of Dzhubga
- East end: Georgian border

Location
- Country: Russia

Highway system
- Russian Federal Highways

The Russian route A147 is a Russian federal highway, a mountain highway that runs along the coast of the Black Sea in Krasnodar Krai from Novorossiysk through Gelendzhik, Tuapse, and Greater Sochi to Adler. The road terminates at Russia's border with Abkhazia/Georgia.

Further south, the route continues as the S1 across Abkhazia to Sukhumi. The Soviet motorway M27 continued even further south, traversing all of Georgia (including the capital Tbilisi) and terminating at Baku, the capital of Azerbaijan.

Until 2018, the A147 was designated as M27.

== Gallery ==
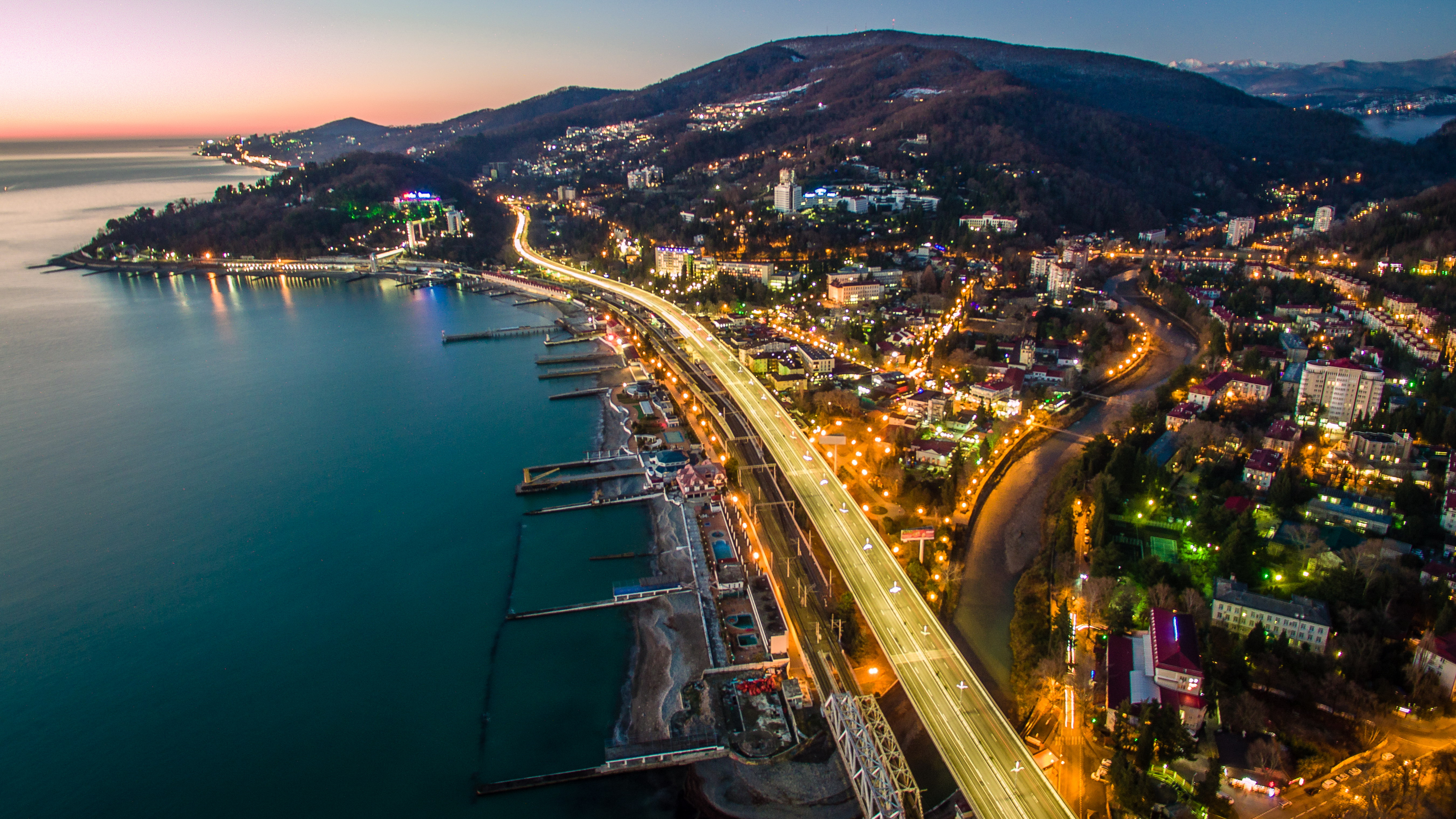

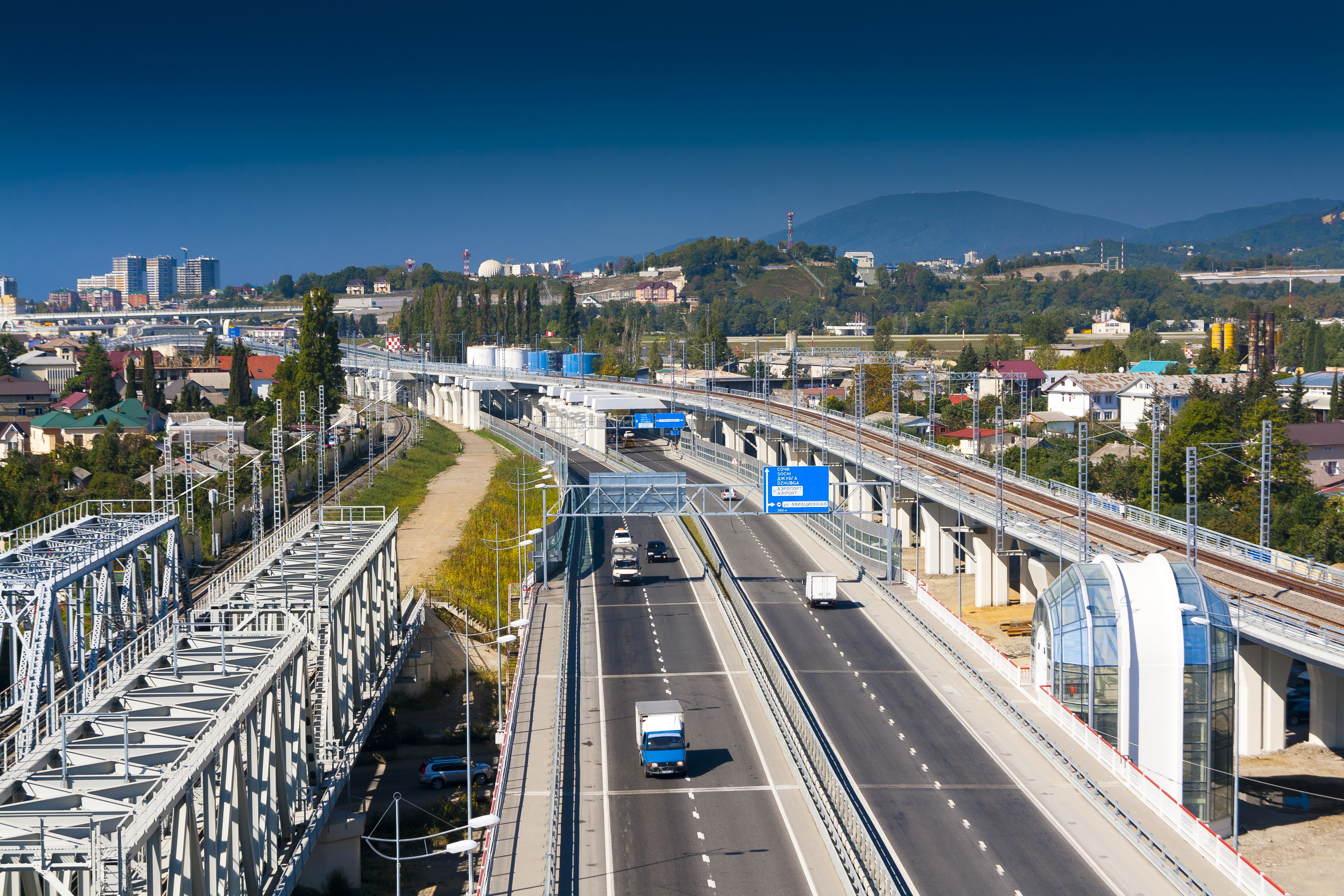

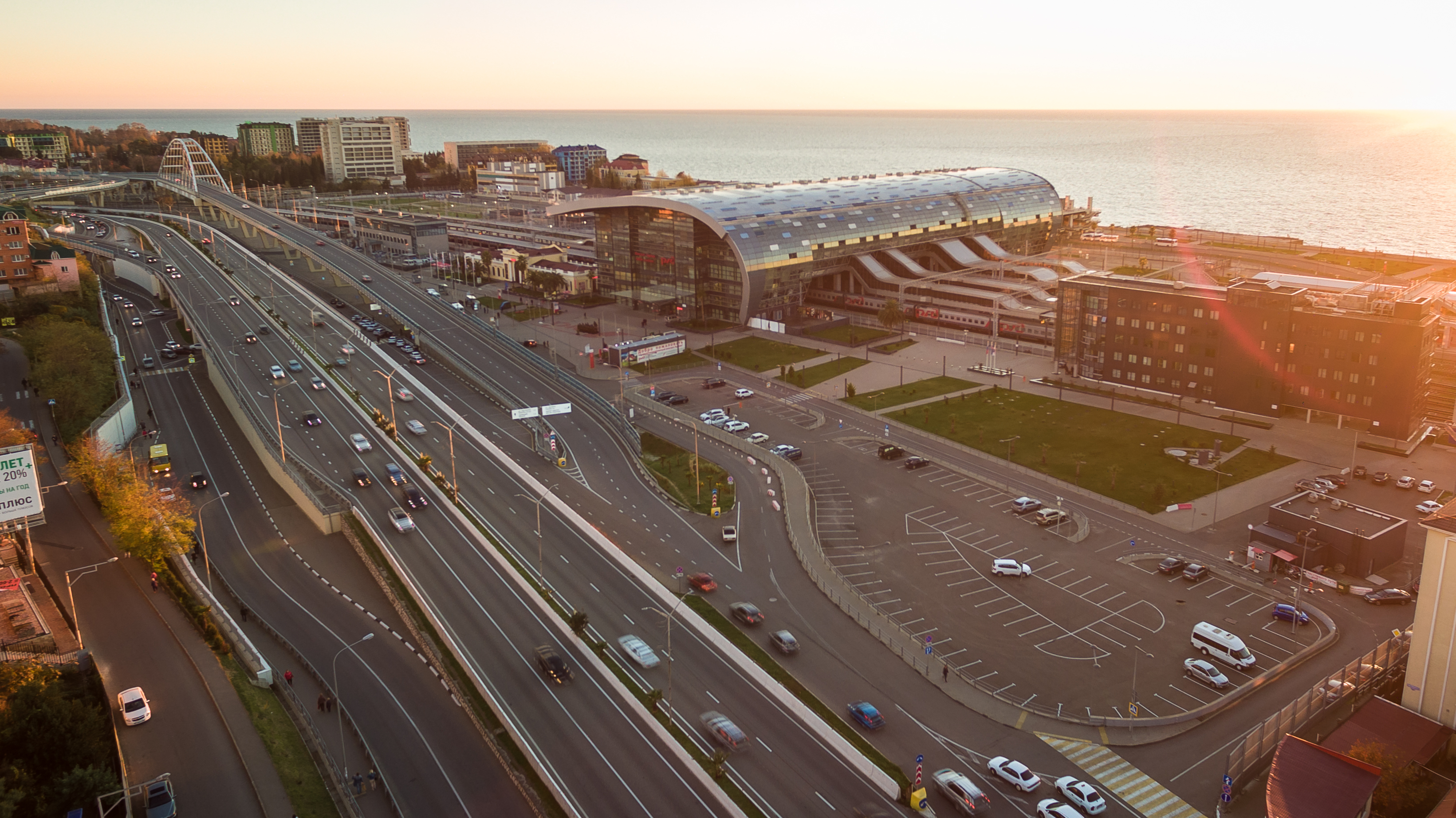

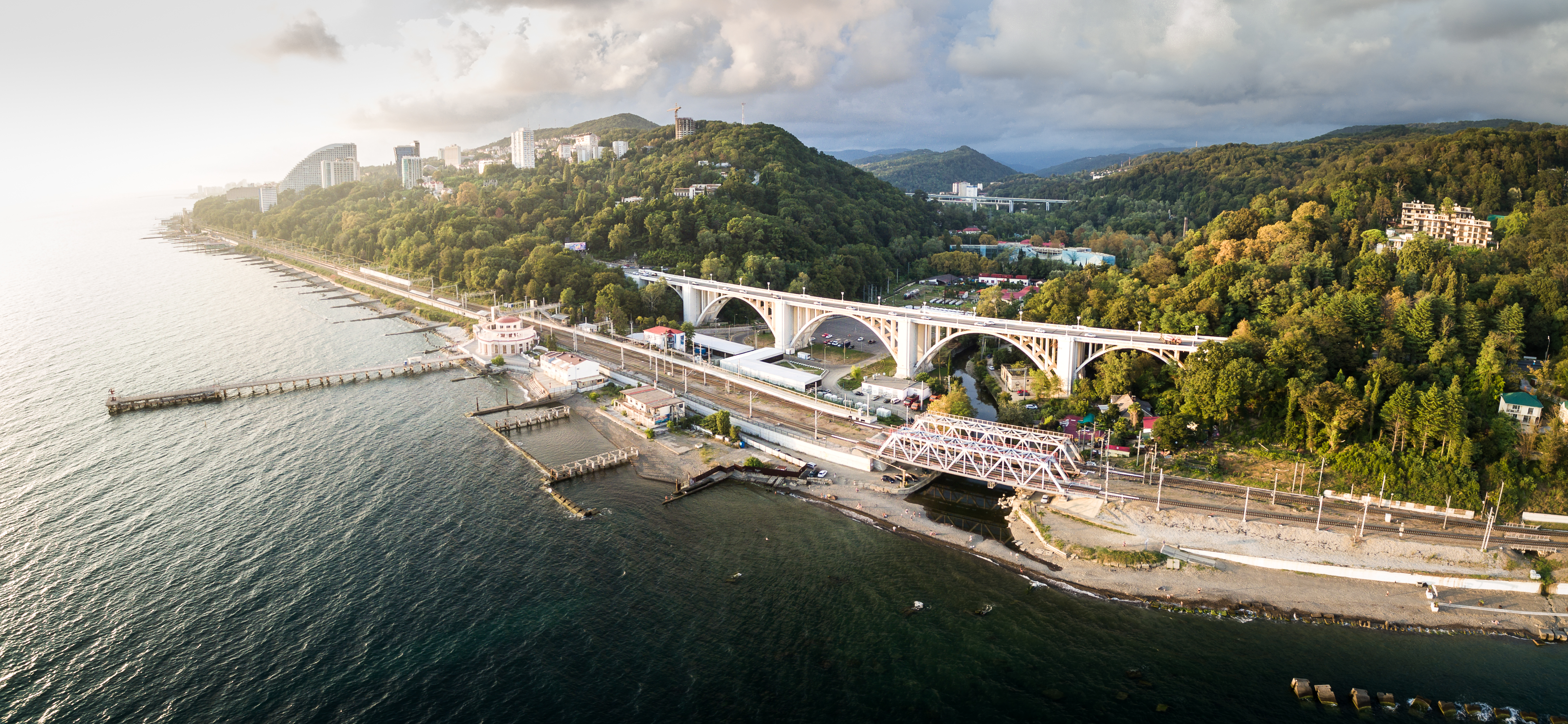
