= HH19 =

HH19, HH-19, HH 19, HH.19, may refer to:

- Sikorsky HH-19, a variant of the Sikorsky H-19 Chickasaw helicopter
- HH19, one of the Hamburger–Hamilton stages in chick development
- DUSP6, dual specificity phosphatase 6, also called "HH19"

== See also ==
- HH (disambiguation)
- H19 (disambiguation)
- H (disambiguation)
