= E119 =

E119 may refer to:

- Ununennium, element 119, a predicted chemical element that has not yet been observed
- European route E119, a road in Russia and Azerbaijan
- E119, a former document type that was replaced by the European Health Insurance Card
