= Putin's Detachments =

Pro-Putin social group

- Отряды Путина
- Named after: Vladimir Putin
- Formation: 2012
- Type: Social movement
- Purpose: Support for Vladimir Putin and fight the opposition
- Location: Krasnodar, Russia
- Leader: Marat Dinaev
- Website: https://www.youtube.com/@otryadyputina

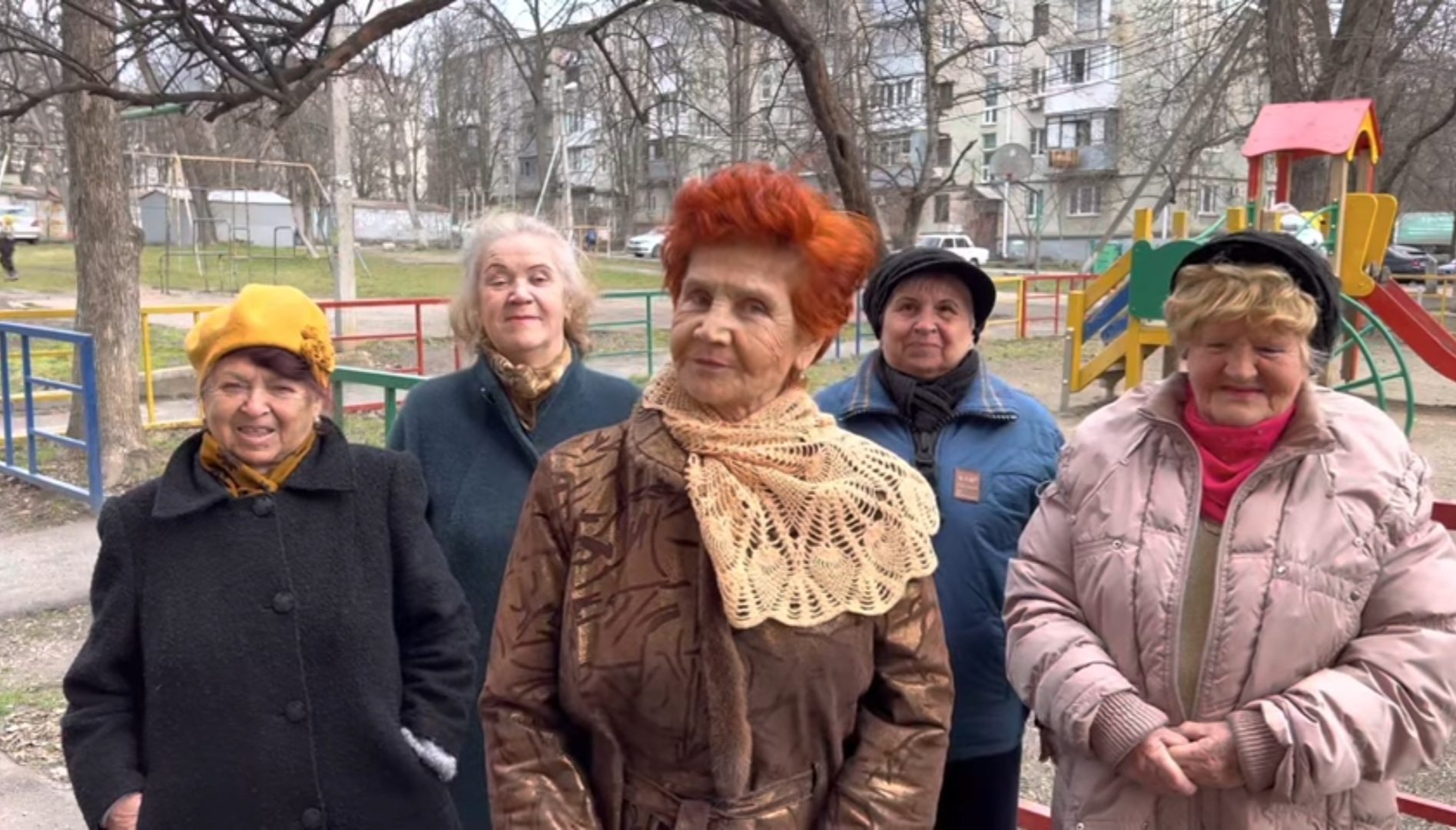
Putin's Detachments address Philipp Kirkorov on March 7, 2023

Putin's Detachments (Russian: Отряды Путина) is a Russian unregistered social movement created by businessman and founder of the Social Justice charitable Fund Marat Dinaev. It is based in Krasnodar and consists mainly of retired grandmothers.

Putin's Detachments proclaim their goal to support Russian President Vladimir Putin and fight the opposition. The movement is best known for its storming of the headquarters of opposition politician Alexei Navalny and the Yabloko party branch. Putin's detachments are also known for their angry appeals to US presidents and burning national flags, dancing to the song "Taet led", the "magic" recipe for COVID-19 and other actions.

Despite its pro-government position, the organization was once almost liquidated at the request of the Russian Ministry of Justice.

== History ==
=== Social Justice ===
In 1996, Marat Dinaev founded the Krasnodar regional social fund for poor and low-income citizens "Social Justice". According to him, the fund helps only children from disadvantaged families, but the elderly are not left out either. As of July 2017, only one Social Justice report for 2016 is available on the information portal of the Ministry of Justice. It lists donations from individuals and legal entities as sources of funding. During the year, the fund spent about 4.5 million rubles on charity and about 850 thousand rubles on taxes, office maintenance and wages. In a similar report for 2014, available on one of the fund's websites, it is noted that 4.35 million rubles were spent on charity, and 335 thousand rubles were spent on additional expenses.

According to Dinaev, the need to create a social movement based on Social Justice arose in 2011, and the name Putin's Detachments appeared in 2015. At the same time, a special banner began to appear in the videos of the movement - a portrait of the President of Russia on a purple flag. The organization itself exists as an interest club without registering as a legal entity.

In September 2013, Krasnodar Mayor Vladimir Yevlanov presented vacation packages in Dzhubga to Social Justice activists as part of the "Older Generation" program. The politician also personally celebrated the 15th and 20th anniversary of the organization. According to the fund's website, in March 2017, the fund distributed food packages to children from low-income families.

According to Dinaev, Social Justice is sponsored by entrepreneurs, and Putin's Detachments themselves exist only with the personal money of the movement's leader. The businessman also claims that Putin's Detachments have nothing to do with the authorities. Sergei Obukhov, a representative of the Krasnodar branch of the Communist Party of the Russian Federation, claimed that Putin's Detachments were funded by the local leadership and that the organization always coordinates applications for its actions before anyone else.

=== Putin's Detachments ===
==== Background ====
Putin's Detachments were created on the basis of the Social Justice charitable fund founded in 1996.

In 2002, the Krasnodar edition of Komsomolskaya Pravda published a critical article about how the governor of the Krasnodar Krai, Alexander Tkachev, was vacationing in the mountain resorts of Austria. After that, a group of pensioners held protests near the editorial office, and then the newspaper, in its article entitled "Mad Grandmothers," described how "a group of old women broke through the security chain and occupied the elevator cabin," and linked the action to the founder of the Social Justice fund, Marat Dinaev. According to Komsomolskaya Pravda, Dinaev bribed elderly people with sausage and peas. At the same time, the protest against the edition was not the first action of the social movement. In the same year, Dinaev tried to run for deputy of the Legislative Assembly of Krasnodar Krai, but the authorities discovered that almost a third of the signatures in support of the candidate were falsified, and removed him from the election campaign. After that, the participants of the movement held a protest against the increase in bread prices on the square near the administration building of the Krasnodar Krai.

Komsomolskaya Pravda reported that Marat Dinaev changed his position after a criminal case was opened against him for beating two people on the street. The businessman confirmed this information and said that he had been on his own recognizance for 6 months on a trumped-up case. According to him, the problem was solved when the activists of Putin's Detachments wrote to the Minister of Internal Affairs, and then the cases were closed.

In 2016, one of the prominent activists of the movement, Lidiya Arkadyevna, died.

==== Idea ====
The founder of the movement, Marat Dinaev, explains the basic idea of Putin's Detachments as follows:

Our main idea since 2012 has been to flood the Internet with viral videos of Putin's Detachments. We are successfully coping with this. Nobody watches boring and gray content. We know the rules of the Internet game. The stronger the resonance, the outrage (and our videos are usually outraged), the more persistently we put pressure on this sore spot. The main thing is that we understand well what is needed. The Internet is a territory where Putin's supporters are not all there. Rather the opposite. <...>
If we take the inner deep motives of activist grandmothers, they worked all their lives, were surrounded by people, and in retirement they were given the role of gradually dying women. We offered them an alternative. We didn't even agitate them. If we had announced this publicly, half of the pensioners would have come to us. They communicate here, for them it is a club of interests, just like in Soviet times. Secondly, it is support for Putin. For these people, as for most Russians, Putin's departure will mean a return to the 1990s.

There is an opinion among the opposition to the movement that Marat Dinaev pursues exclusively commercial goals. Political scientist and blogger Andrey Reshetnikov noted that older women come to the organization to feel in demand again, to be on the team. Grigory Kiselyov, head of the Center for Political Research and Technology, calls Marat Dinaev "a relic of a bygone era <...>. To some extent, his work can be called a form of art, and not even mass, but downright elitist." According to him, the activities of Putin's Detachments can be observed "as an endless happening, devoid of content and existing only for form."

==== Examples of actions ====
On March 29, 2017, a cover of the popular song "Taet led" by the group "Griby" was published on the YouTube channel of Putin's Detachments. In the video, three elderly women and an elderly man talk about how Alexei Navalny wants to appropriate Russia for himself, but he will not succeed. In May, Navalny himself reacted to it and jokingly announced that he was going to retire from politics.

On July 4, Putin's Detachments attacked Alexei Navalny's headquarters in Krasnodar. A group of activists, mostly consisting of retired women, shouted slogans, tore down posters and overturned furniture. Posters in the headquarters were torn down, frames were broken, chairs and tables were overturned. Marat Dinaev said that the situation at Navalny's headquarters in Krasnodar was allegedly provoked by his supporters.

On August 3, activists of Putin's Detachments attacked Alexei Navalny's Krasnodar headquarters.

In June 2020, the court ordered Marat Dinaev to pay 300 thousand rubles for defamation of human rights defender Sergei Tchaikovsky and decided to refute information on the Internet that was not true.

On March 2, 2021, members of the Putin's Detachments movement opposed the Clubhouse social network. According to activists, there is a mess, dens and the collapse of everything on the social network, as well as suicides. They called Clubhouse immorality, which kills young people. At the end of the video, the activists loudly chant "Close it! Close it! Close it!"

On February 16, 2022, Putin's Detachments appealed to US President Joe Biden. In the video, members of the movement commented on Biden's speeches to Russian citizens. The pensioners claimed that they did not believe the politician's words.

== Office ==
The fund's office is located on the territory of a former apartment on the first floor of a five-story building. As noted by Kavkaz.Realii, beige wallpaper from the 1990s is glued to the walls of the office and everywhere there are portraits of Russian President Vladimir Putin - on the flag, banners, leaflets, even on a tea mug. The creator of Putin's Detachments does not like being compared to LDPR leader Vladimir Zhirinovsky.

In 2017, Krasnodar supporters of Alexei Navalny discovered that the office of "Social Justice" was located in a building belonging to the Krasnodar Department of Municipal Property and Urban lands, and despite a court decision in 2015 to terminate the occupation of the office by "Social Justice", the organization continued to occupy it. The Krasnodar administration reported that the office was transferred to Social Justice as a charitable organization and the fund did not receive any money from the city. It was noted: "The members of the organization are actually involved in political actions, and the charitable status becomes to some extent a cover for actions that are not related to the goals and objectives of the organization that received municipal premises."

== See also ==
- Safe Internet League
