= European route E592 =

Road in trans-European E-road network

E592

Route information
- Length: 133 km (83 mi)

Major junctions
- From: Krasnodar
- To: Dzhubga

Location
- Countries: Russia

Highway system
- International E-road network; A Class; B Class

European route E 592 is a European B class road in Russia, connecting the cities Krasnodar and Dzhubga.

== Route ==
- Russia
  - M 4: Krasnodar ( E115) - Dzhubga ( E97)
