= Highway M14 (Ukraine) =

Highway in Ukraine

Highway M14
- Автошлях М14
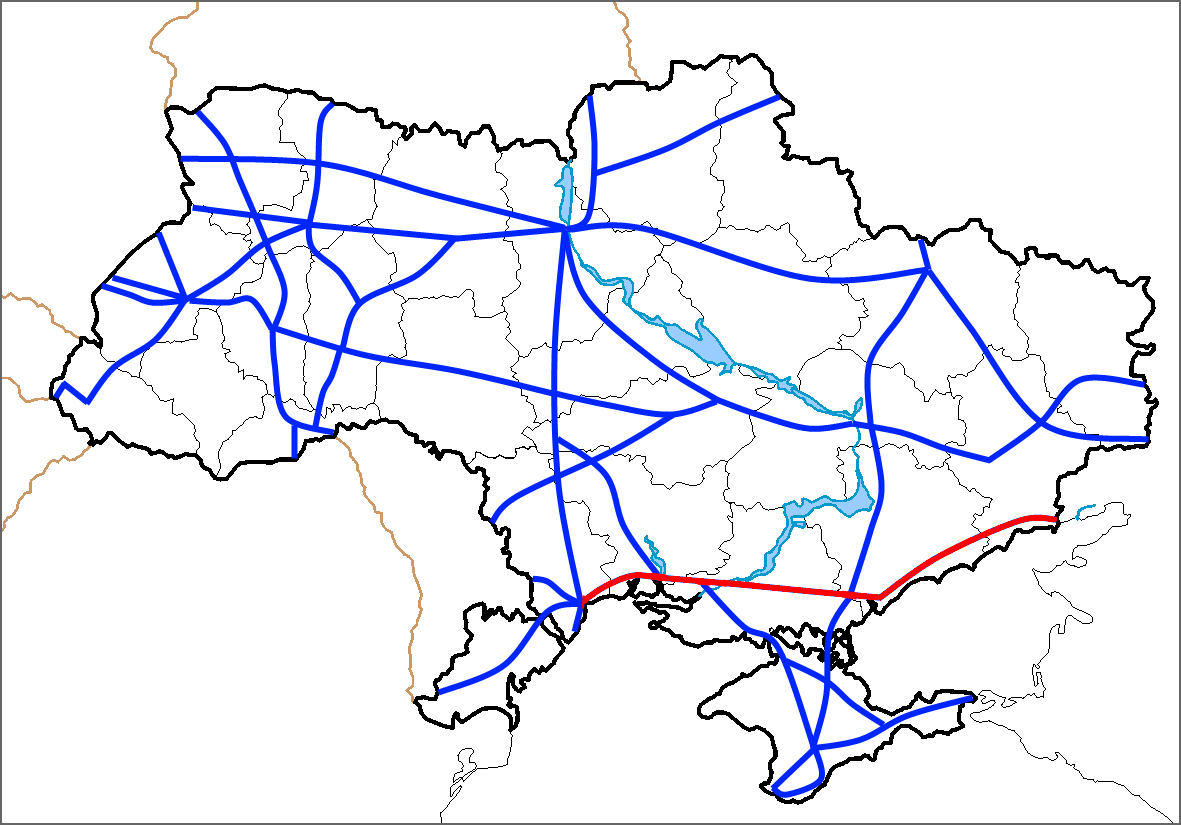

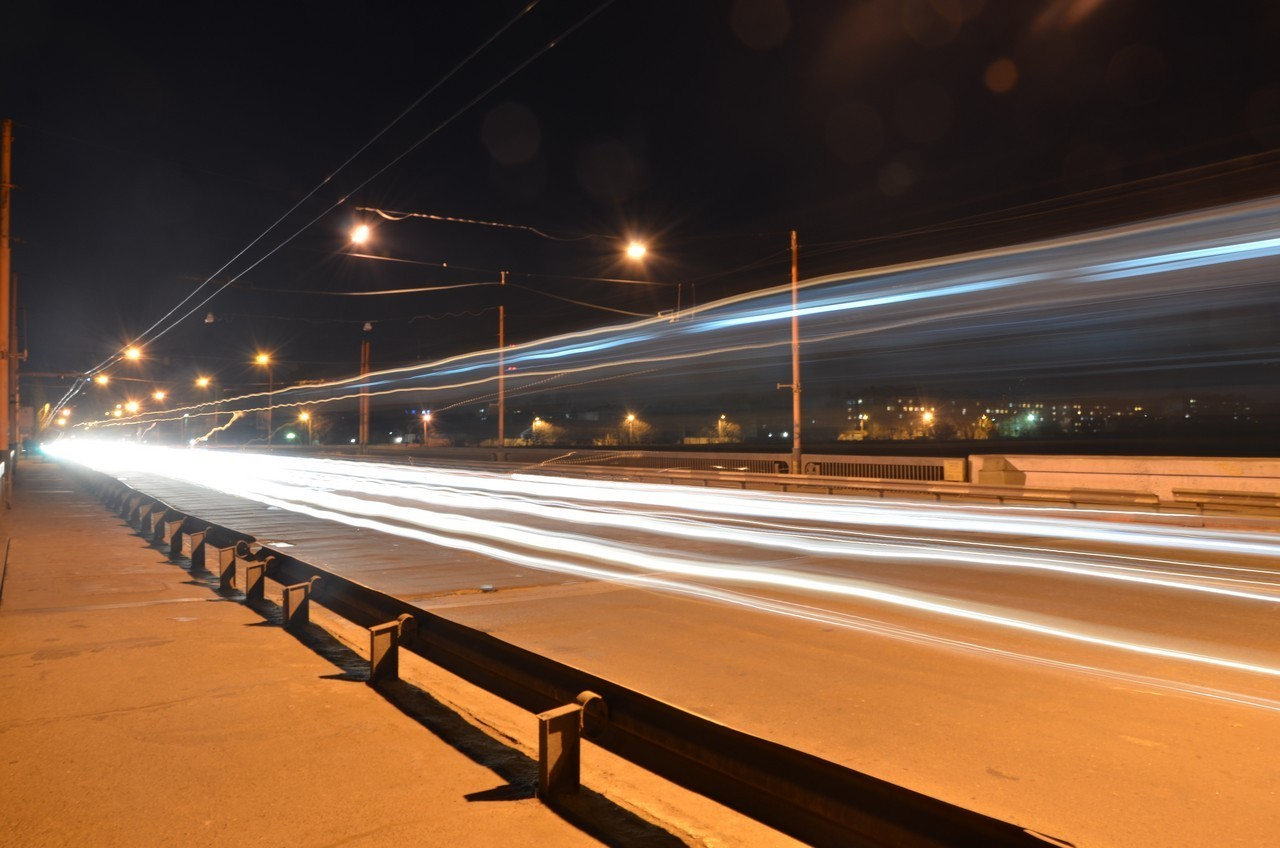

Route information
- Part of E58
- Length: 624.3 km (387.9 mi) 652.5 km (405.4 mi) with access roads

Major junctions
- West end: M 16 in Odesa
- M 17 in Kherson; M 18 in Melitopol
- East end: Russian border at Novoazovsk

Location
- Country: Ukraine
- Oblasts: Odesa, Mykolaiv, Kherson, Zaporizhzhia, Donetsk

Highway system
- Roads in Ukraine; State Highways

Highway M14 is a Ukrainian international highway (M-highway) connecting Odesa to the Russian border east of Mariupol, where it continues into Russia as the A280. The highway stretch between Melitopol and the Russo-Ukrainian border is part of what has been dubbed the Highway of Death in 2026, due to frequent Ukrainian drone strikes on Russian military vehicles.

== General overview ==
The M14 is a major transnational corridor and along with the M16 combines into the southern branch of European route E58 in Ukraine (another one in Zakarpattia). The highway is also part of the Eurasian transportation corridor and the Black-Sea Economic Association transportation corridor (ChES). It runs along the coastal line of Black and Azov seas, connecting two major ports of Ukraine in Odesa and Mariupol. The M14 connects two major European routes: E95 and E105.

Since 2014, a part of the road in eastern Ukraine has been under the control of the separatist Donetsk People's Republic. During the 2022 Russian invasion of Ukraine, Russia took direct control of areas of the road in Donbas, Kherson Oblast and Zaporizhzhia Oblast. As of July 2026, Russia controls the section starting from Dachi to the highway's East end.

== Main route ==
Main route and connections to/intersections with other highways in Ukraine.

Marker	Main settlements	Notes	Highway Interchanges
0 km	Odesa		E58 M 16 • E95( M 05 - Ferry) • E87 M 15 • M 22 • H 04
	Mykolaiv		H 11 • H 14
	Kherson		E97 M 17
	Melitopol		E105 M 18
	Mariupol		H 20
624 km	Novoazovsk / border with Russia		(Russia) E58 A 280

== See also ==
- Roads in Ukraine
- State highways (Ukraine)
- International E-road network
- Pan-European corridors
