= Kop Pass =

- Kop Geçidi
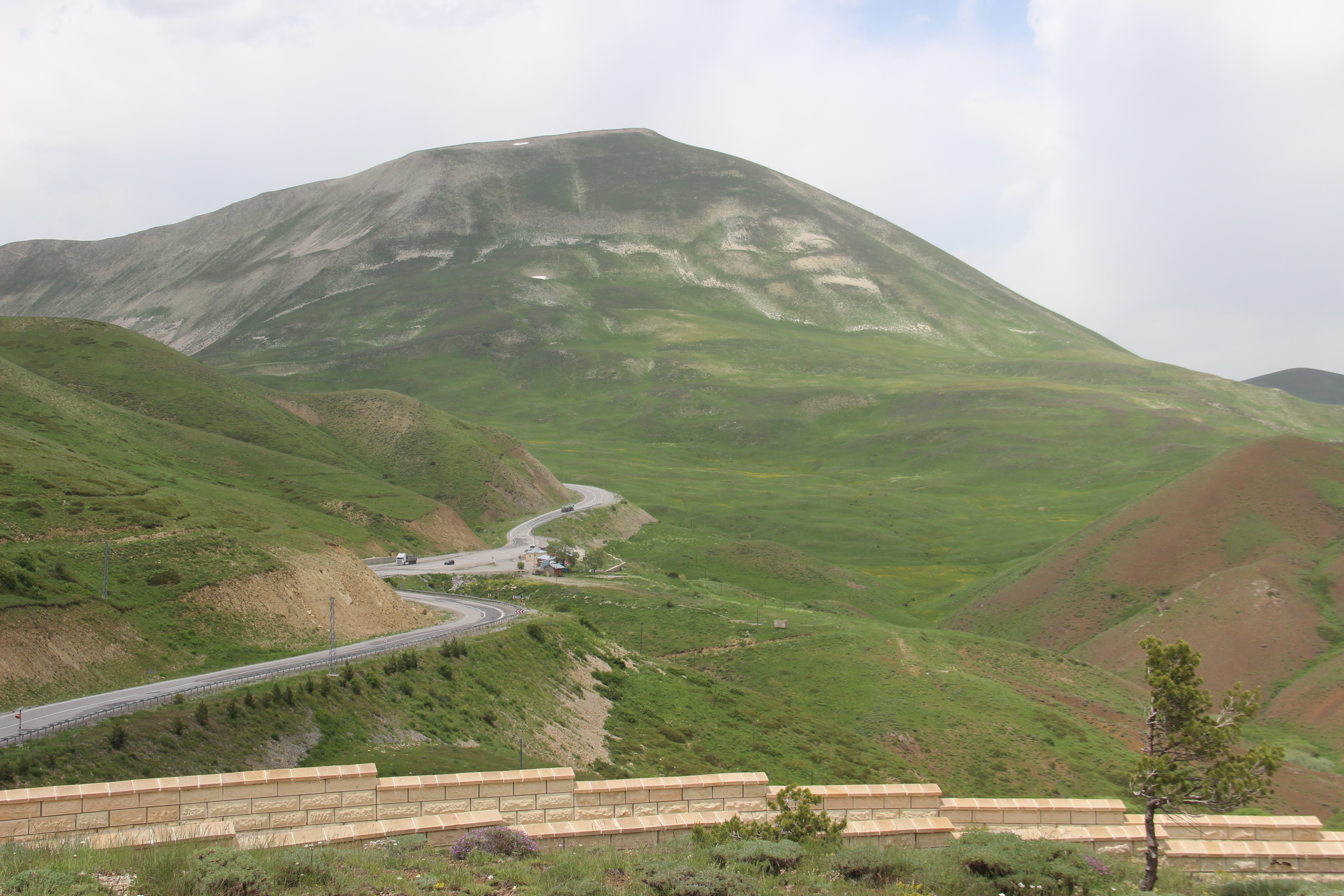
- Highway D.915 at Kop Pass.

- Location within Turkey
- Elevation: 2,409 metres (7,904 ft)
- Traversed by: Route D.915 E97

Third Approach
- Location: Bayburt Province, Turkey
- Range: Mount Kop
- Coordinates: 40°01′36.72″N 40°31′09.3″E

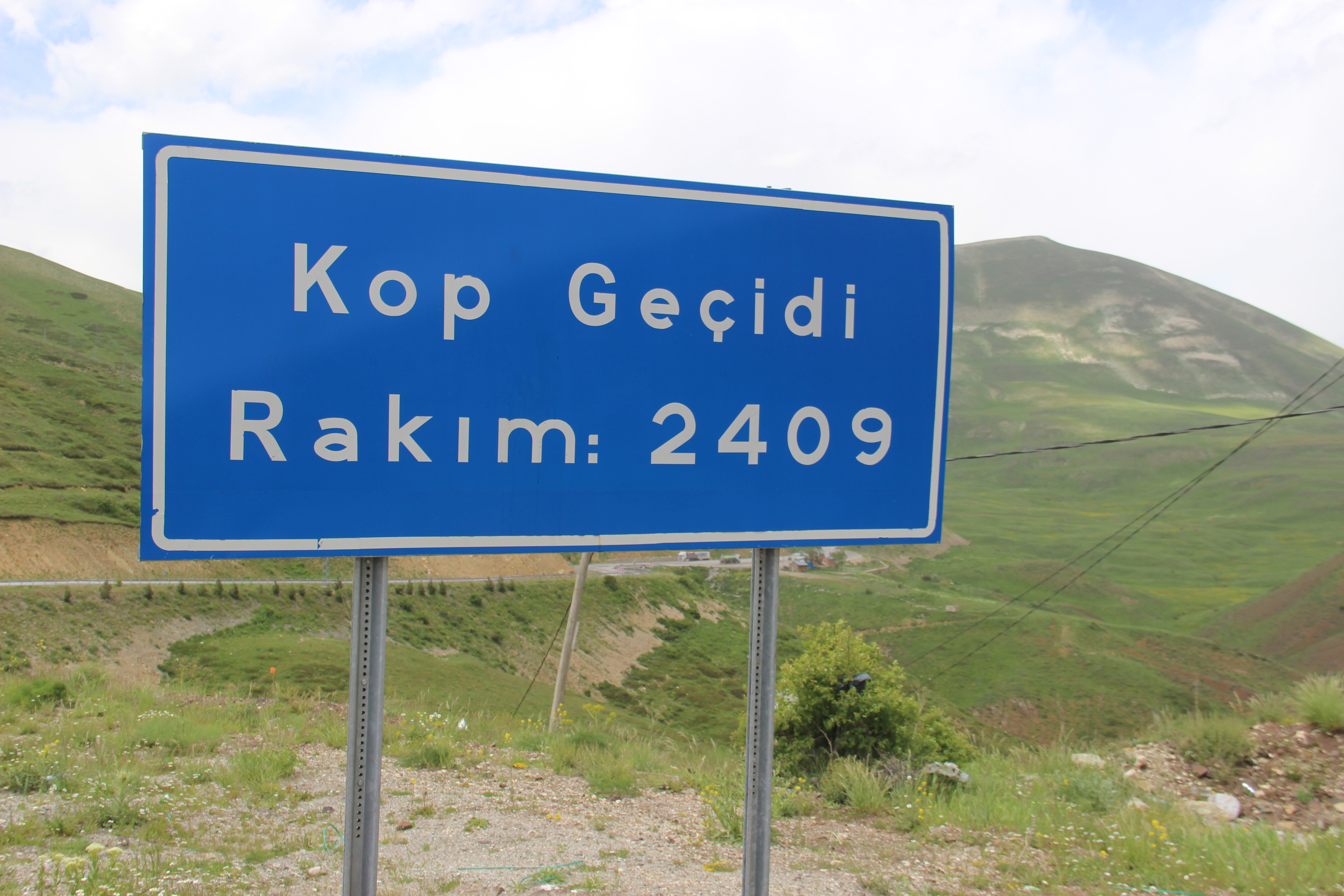
Elevation sign at Kop Pass.

The Kop Pass (Turkish: Kop Geçidi) is a high mountain pass situated on the Mount Kop in Bayburt Province in eastern Turkey. The pass is at 2,409 m (7,904 ft) above sea level. It is on the Bayburt-Erzurum route D.915 E97, connecting eastern Black Sea Region with Eastern Anatolia region, at a distance of 36 km (22 mi) southeast of Bayburt and 72 km (45 mi) northwest of Erzurum.

It is difficult to keep the pass open to traffic in winter time due to snow and fog in harsh weather conditions. The Mount Kop Tunnel, which is being built west of the pass, bypasses the Kop Pass enabling also a shortcut. A monument of the Mount Kop Defense National Historic Park is situated on the summit of the mountain.
