= Langi =

Langi may refer to:

- Ləngi, Azerbaijan
- Langi people, a people of Uganda
- Langi (burial), Tongan burial structures for kings
