= E115 =

E115 may refer to:

- European route E115
- Element 115, moscovium (Mc)
- A battery electric vehicle SUV concept car: Hongqi § Concept cars
