= Tavrida Highway =

Road in Crimea

Federal Highway A291
- Федеральная автомобильная дорога А291

Route information
- Part of E97
- Length: 250.7 km (155.8 mi)

Major junctions
- East end: A 290 in Kerch
- M 18 (35A-002) in Simferopol
- West end: P 27 (67Р-1) near Sevastopol

Location
- Country: Russia
- Republics: Crimea

Highway system
- Russian Federal Highways
← A 290	→ A 295

The Tavrida Highway is a four-lane highway in Crimea, designated as A291 by the Russian administration, with a length of 250.7 km (155.8 mi). Construction of the road began in 2017. The project's costs exceed 150 bln rubles ($2.3 bln). The construction is funded from the federal target program for the development of the Crimea and Sevastopol.

According to OpenStreetMap, the highway is partially concurrent with:

- 35А-001 Граница с Украиной - Джанкой - Феодосия - Керчь, the Russian designation of the Crimean part of Ukrainian Highway M17.
- 35К-003 Симферополь - Феодосия
- 35Р-001 Симферополь - Бахчисарай - Севастополь
- E97

== Gallery ==
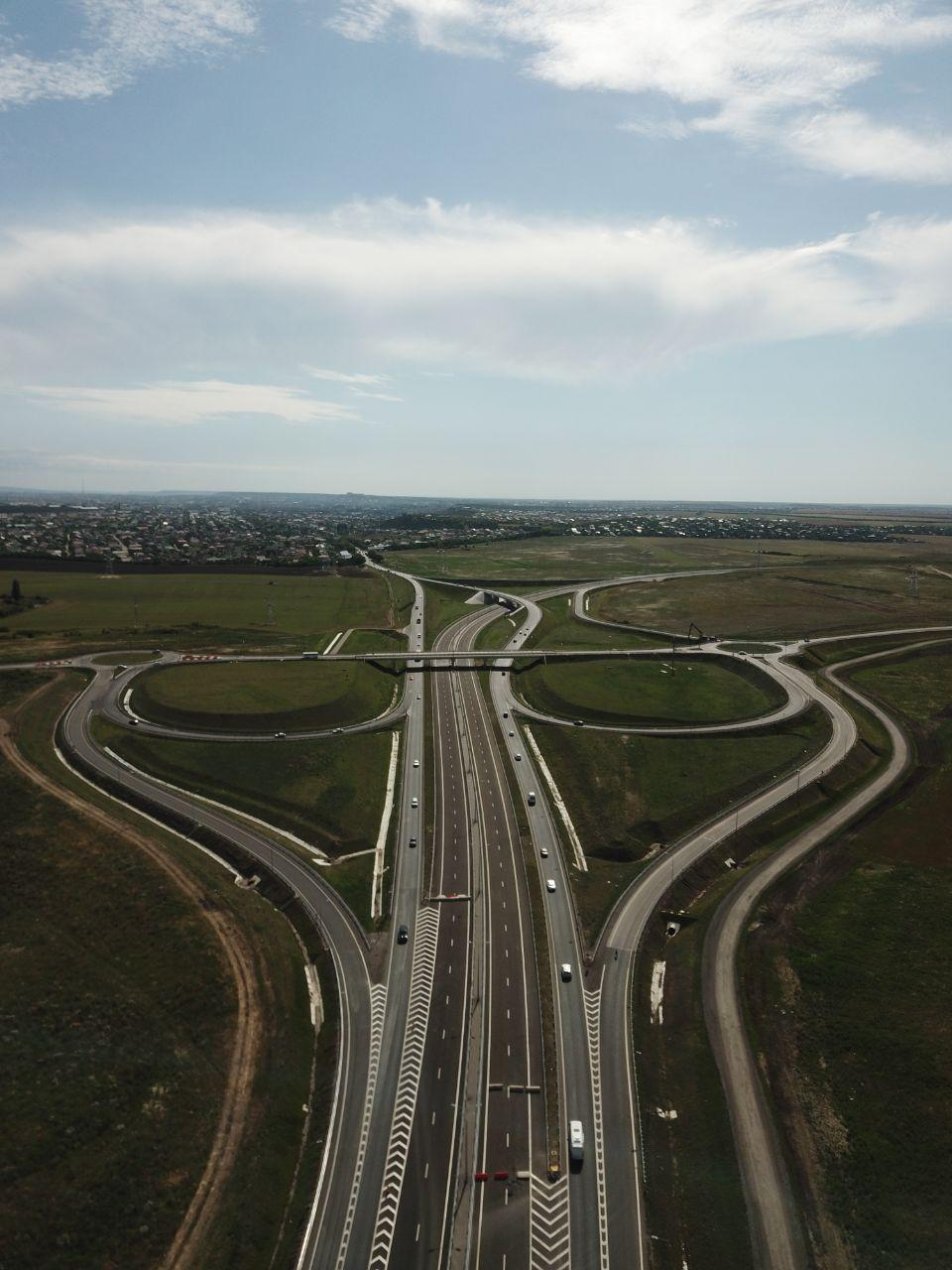

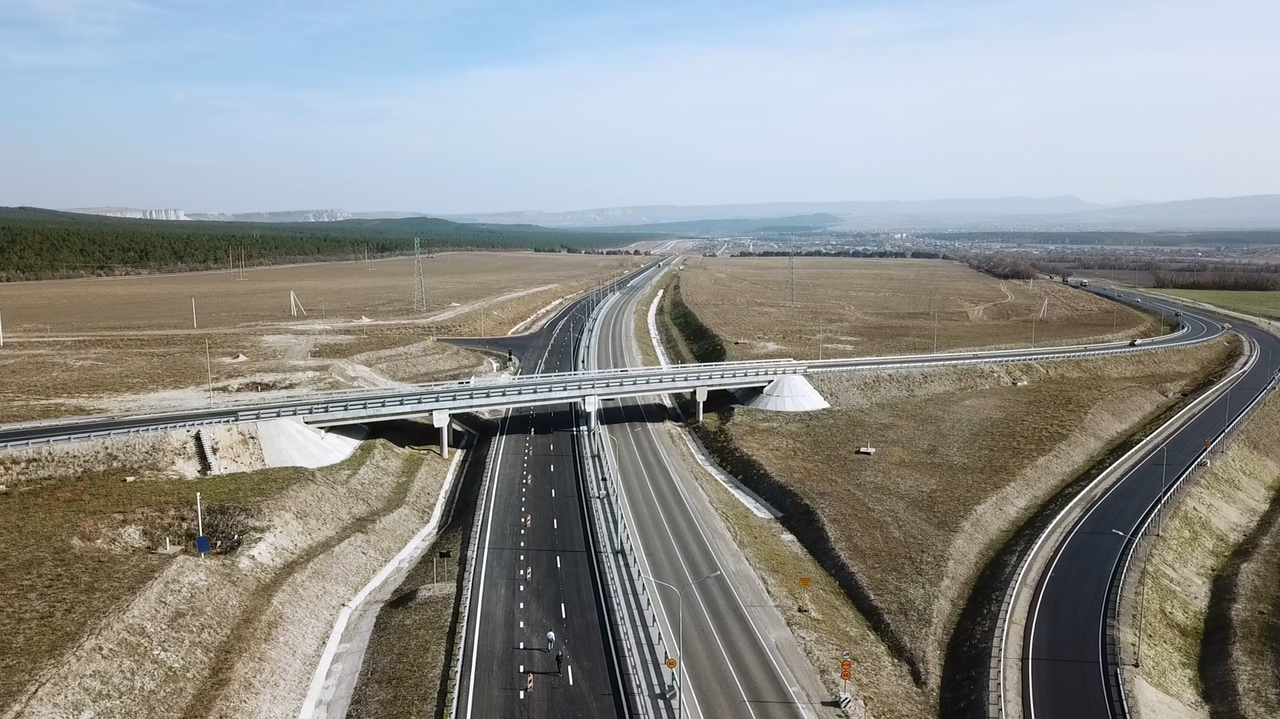

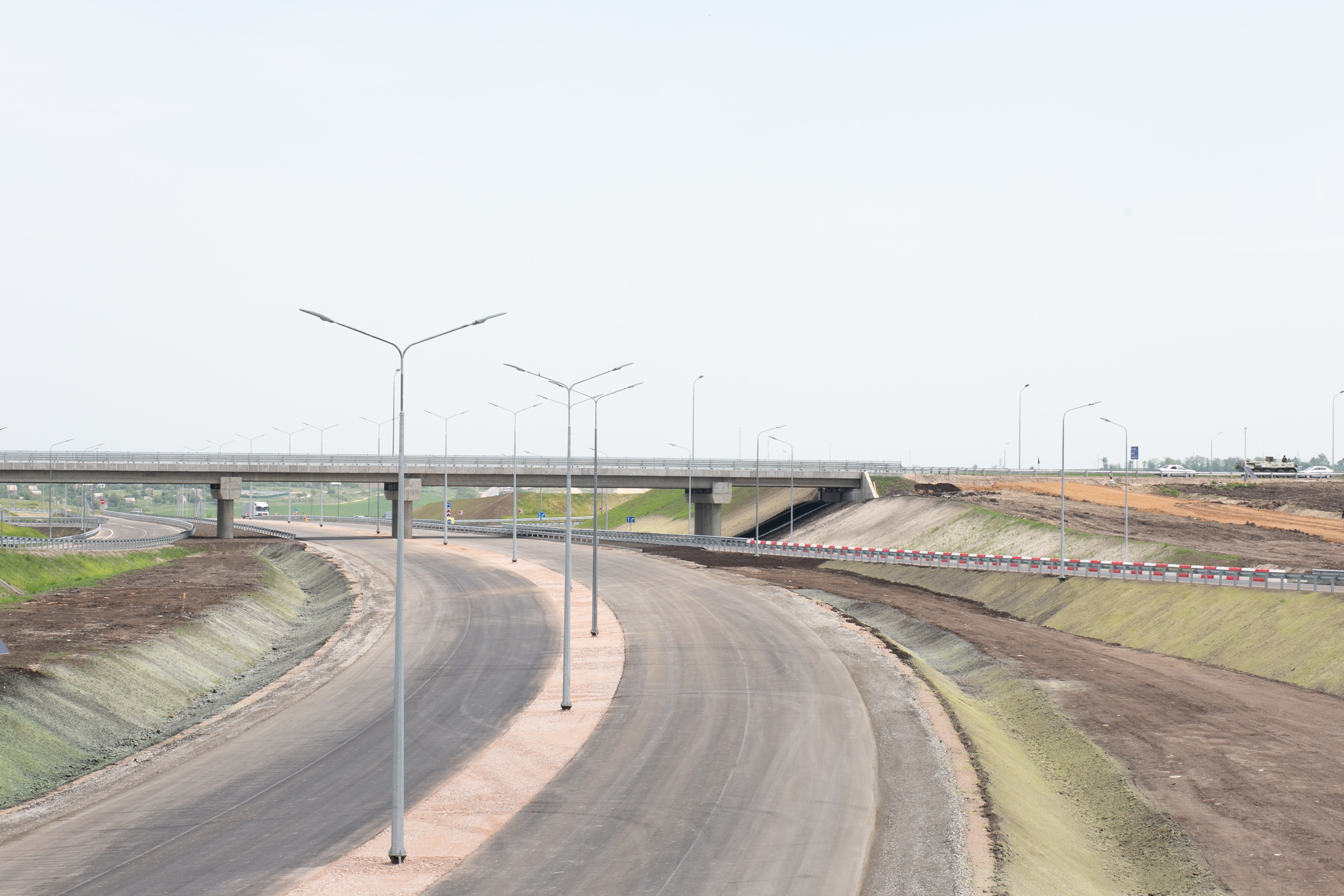
