= State road D.915 (Turkey) =

Highway between Of and Aşkale in Turkey

D.915

Route information
- Part of E96
- Length: 179 km (111 mi)

Major junctions
- North end: Of, Trabzon, D.010 / E70 Jct

- South end: Aşkale, Erzurum, D.100 / E80 Jct

Location
- Country: Turkey

Highway system
- Highways in Turkey; Motorways; List; State Highways; List

D.915 is a north-to-south state road in northeastern Turkey. The 179 km-long (111 mi) road starts at Of, Trabzon on the coast of the Black Sea branching from D.010 and ends in Aşkale, Erzurum joining D.100 running in a high-elevation mountainous terrain. The route is composed of two parts crossed and overlapped by D.050 on a length of 13 km (8.1 mi) north of Bayburt. The northern part, between Of and Bayburt is 107 km (66 mi) long, and the southern part, between Bayburt and Aşkale is 72 km (45 mi). The northern section, which is the Derebaşı curves, is considered one of the most dangerous routes in the world.

The route's northern part runs through the Trabzon Province districts Dernekpazarı and Çaykara, passes by Uzungöl and crosses Mount Soğanlı of the Karadeniz Mountain Range with the Soğanlı Pass at 2,330 m (7,640 ft) AMSL on the province border Trabzon-Bayburt, and crosses over Çoruh River before joining D.050.

Starting on the junction of D.050 in Bayburt, the southern part of the route runs through Maden, crosses Mount Kop of the Otlukbeli Mountains with the Kop Pass at 2,409 m (7,904 ft) AMSL just south of the province border Bayburt-Erzurum, where a highway tunnel is under construction to ease the route with several hairpin turns. It reaches Aşkale on the D.100 (E80). The route from Bayburt to Aşkale is part of European route E87.

== Road from Of to Bayburt ==
Built in 1916 by the Russian soldiers following the Trebizond Campaign, the road from Of to Bayburt runs on Mt. Soğanlı climbing up to an elevation of 2,035 m (6,677 ft) above sea level. The route without guardrails includes 29 steep hairpin turns. While the start and end sections of the route are paved with asphalt, the center part is only gravel. It is difficult to travel particularly in wet and dark conditions or by fog and snow, and it is considered one of the most dangerous roads in the world, even more dangerous than the Death Road in Bolivia.

Named Derebaşı Turns, the most risky part of the route is situated in Çaykara with 13 hairpin turns. Over a stretch of only 5.1 km (3.2 mi), the route's elevation changes from 1,712 to 2,035 m (5,617 to 6,677 ft).
