= Highway M17 (Ukraine) =

Highway in Ukraine

Highway M17
- Автошлях М17
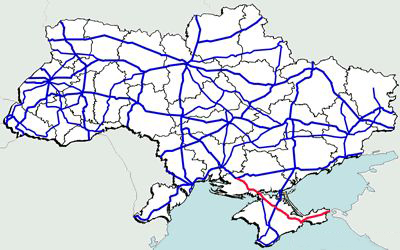

Route information
- Part of E97
- Length: 423.6 km (263.2 mi)

Major junctions
- West end: M 14 in Kherson
- M 18 in Dzhankoy
- West end: A 290 in Kerch

Location
- Country: Ukraine
- Oblasts: Kherson, Crimea

Highway system
- Roads in Ukraine; State Highways

Highway M17 is a Ukrainian international highway (M-highway) connecting Kherson to the Russian border over the Kerch Strait, where it continues into Russia as the A290. The M17 is part of European route E97.

Since 2014 annexation of Crimea by Russia, a part of the road located on the peninsula is de facto operated by Russia, which designated that portion of the highway as two regional routes of the Republic of Crimea: 35A-001 north of the Krasnoperekopsk, and 35K-001 south of that town. The Tavrida Highway is partially concurrent with 35A-001.

During the 2022 Russian invasion of Ukraine, Russia took direct control of areas of the road in Kherson Oblast.

== Main route ==
Main route and connections to/intersections with other highways in Ukraine.

Marker	Main settlements	Notes	Highway Interchanges
0 km	Kherson		M 14
	Krasnoperekopsk		H 05
	Dzhankoy		M 18
423 km	Kerch		A 290

== Gallery ==
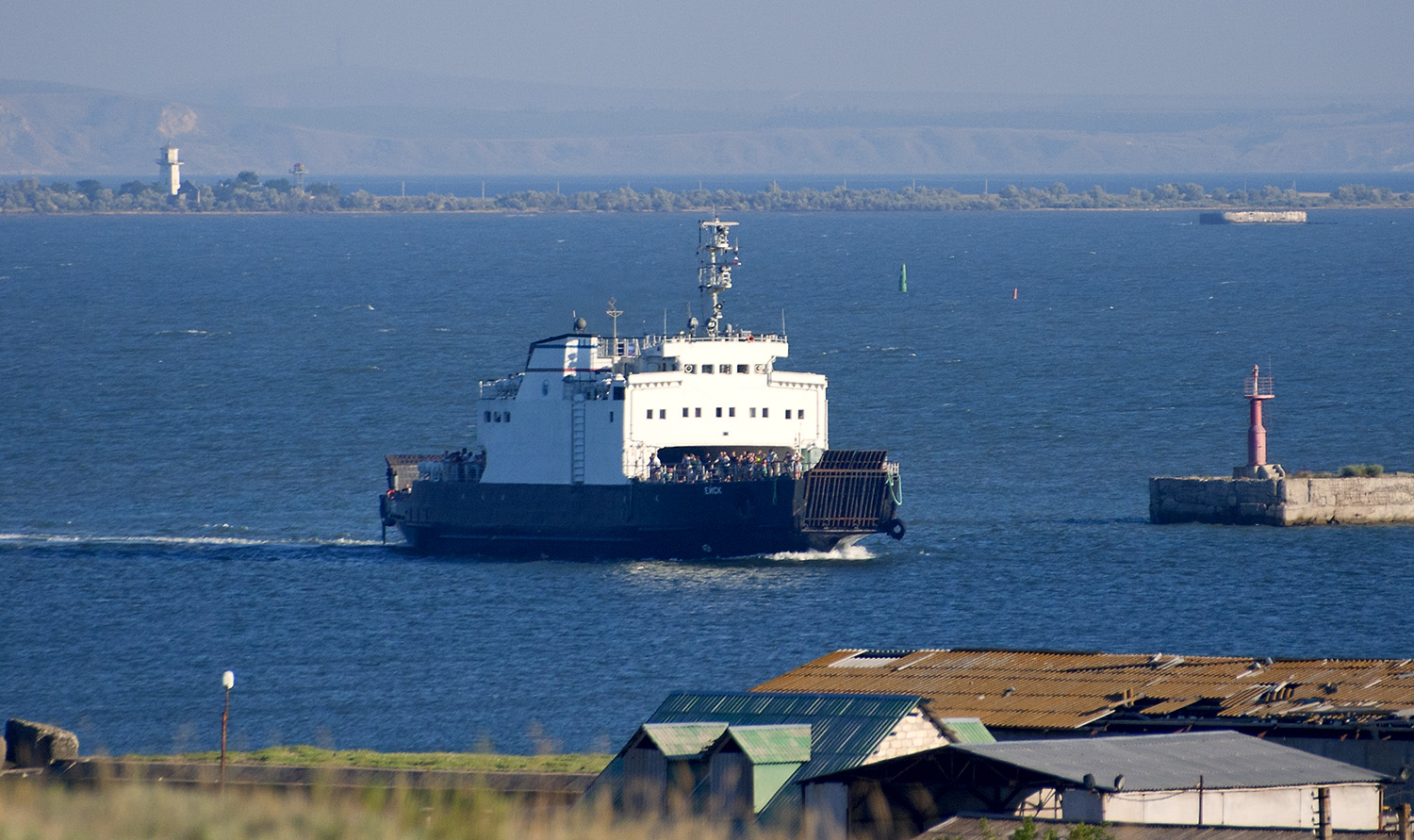
Kerch Ferry Line

== See also ==
- Roads in Ukraine
- Ukraine Highways
- International E-road network
- Pan-European corridors
