= Highway H20 (Ukraine) =

Highway in Ukraine

Highway H20
- Автошлях Н20
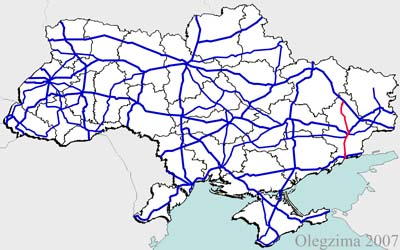

Route information
- Length: 190.4 km (118.3 mi)
- Existed: 2006–present

Major junctions
- North end: M 03 in Sloviansk
- H 15/ H 21 in Donetsk
- South end: M 14 in Mariupol

Location
- Country: Ukraine
- Oblasts: Donetsk

Highway system
- Roads in Ukraine; State Highways
← H 19	→ H 21

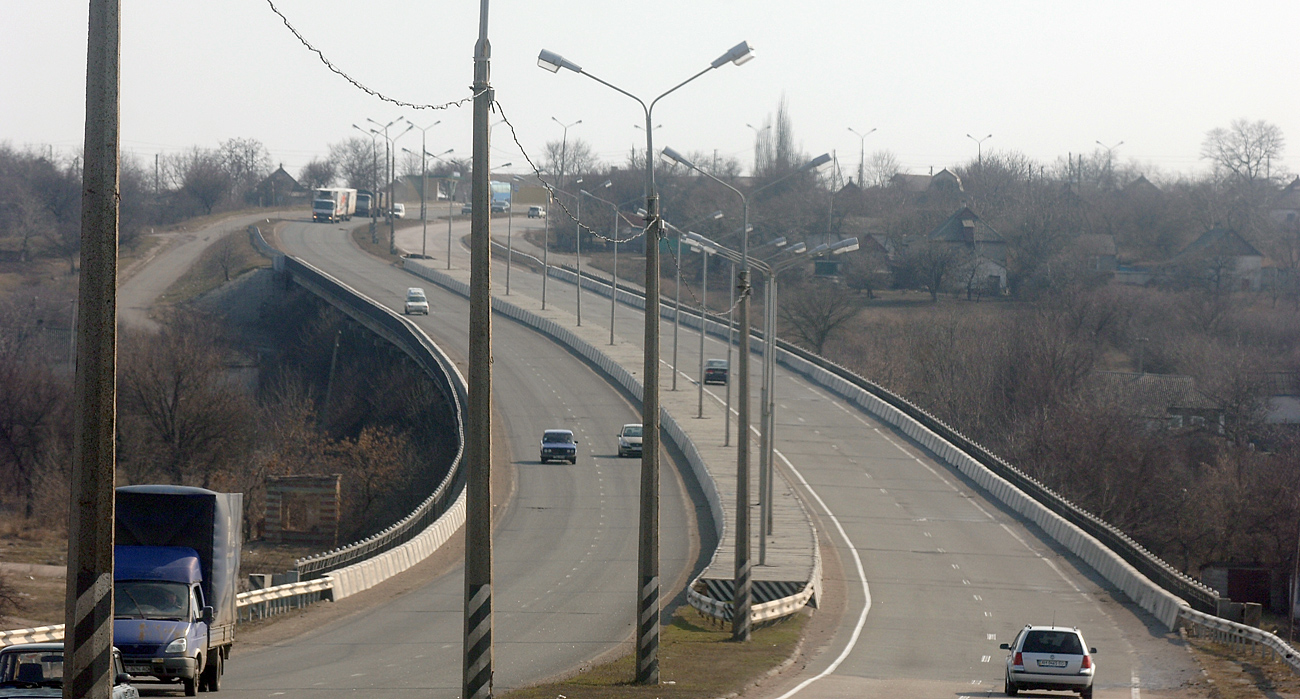
H20 road near Novotroitske

H20 is an important Ukraine national highway (H-highway) in the Donetsk Oblast, Donbas, Ukraine, running mainly north–south and connecting Sloviansk though Donetsk with Mariupol on the shores of Taganrog Bay in the Sea of Azov near the mouth of the Kalmius River. It passes through Kramatorsk, Druzhkivka, Oleksiievo-Druzhkivka, Osykove, Kostiantynivka, Berestok, Romanivka, Kamianka, Makiivka, Donetsk, Dolia, Syhnalne-Olenivka, Berezove, Novotroitske, Buhas, Volnovakha, Dmytrivka, Polkove, Pryvilne, Hranitne, and Kasianivka.

Before 1998, the road was designated as P40 and was P19 from 1998 to 2006.

== War in Donbas ==
Significant armed conflict has occurred along and near the H20 during the war in Donbas. On 13 January 2015, pro-Russia militants attacked a bus near Buhas and Volnovakha. It is known as the 'road of life' or the 'road of death'.

== Main route ==
Main route and connections to or intersections with other highways in Ukraine.

Marker	Main settlements	Notes	Highway Interchanges
0 km	Sloviansk		E40 M 03
	Kramatorsk		T0510
	Kostiantynivka		T-05-04
	near Novokalynove and Ocheretyne		T0511
	Donetsk		E50 M 04 • H 21 • T0508 • H 15
	near Berezove and Dokuchaievsk		T0509
	Novotroitske		T0509
	Volnovakha		T0512
	near Pryvilne and Hranitne		T0523
190.6 km	Mariupol		M 14 E58

== See also ==
- Highway of Death (Ukraine)
- Roads in Ukraine
- Ukraine Highways
- Volodymyr Boiko Stadium
