= Highway M18 (Ukraine) =

Highway in Ukraine

Highway M18
- Автошлях М18
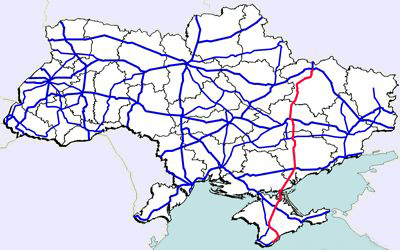

Route information
- Part of E105
- Length: 682.6 km (424.1 mi) 731.6 km (454.6 mi) with access roads

Major junctions
- North end: M 03 / M 20 in Kharkiv
- M 30 in Novomoskovsk; M 14 in Melitopol; M 17 in Dzhankoy
- South end: H 19 in Yalta

Location
- Country: Ukraine
- Oblasts: Kharkiv, Dnipropetrovsk, Zaporizhia, Kherson, Crimea

Highway system
- Roads in Ukraine; State Highways
← M 17	→ M 19

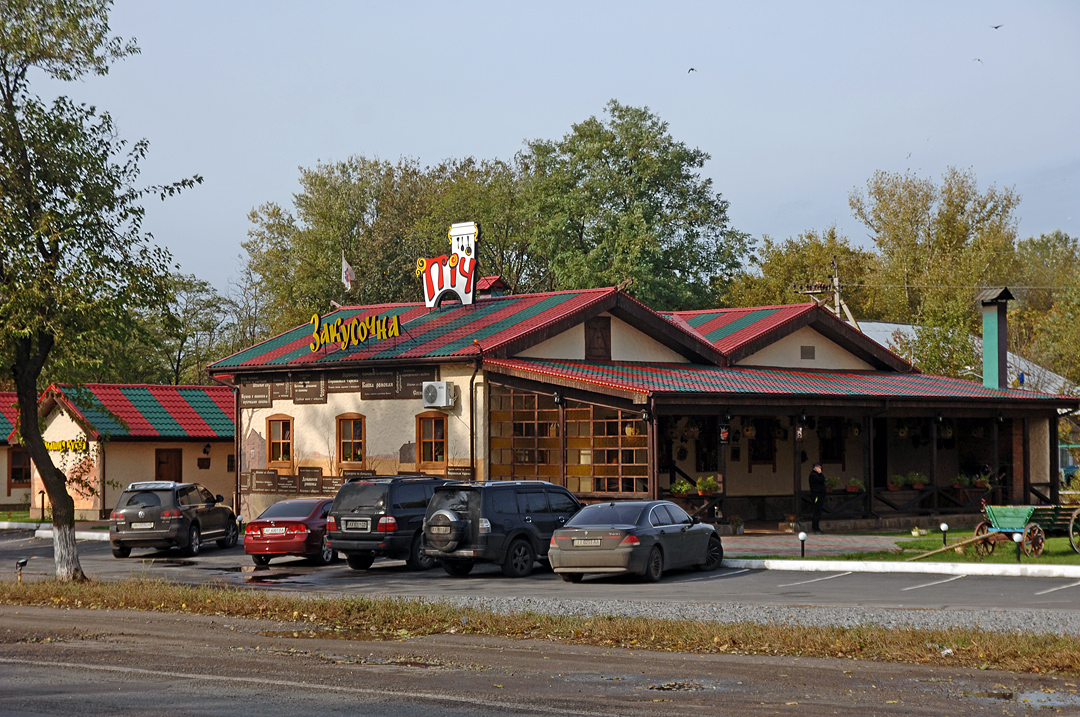
A roadside cafe on M18 near Melitopol

Highway M18 is a Ukrainian international highway (M-highway) connecting Kharkiv to the southern coast of Crimea in Yalta. The highway is also has an alternative route (M29) which runs parallel and designed as an expressway between Kharkiv and Novomoskovsk. The section from Novomoskovsk to Yalta is part of European route E105. The section from Kharkiv to Krasnohrad was previously P51.

The section between Yalta and the border of Crimea belongs to Crimea which has been annexed by Russia in 2014. Russia refers to the section in Crimea as 35A-002. During the 2022 Russian invasion of Ukraine, Russia took direct control of the whole section of the road in Kherson Oblast and a part of the Zaporizhzhia Oblast section. The highway stretch between Melitopol and Simferopol is part of what has been dubbed the Highway of Death in 2026, due to frequent Ukrainian drone strikes on Russian military vehicles.

== Main route ==
Main route and connections to/intersections with other highways in Ukraine.

Marker	Main settlements	Notes	Highway Interchanges
0 km	Kharkiv		M 20 • M 03
	Novoselivka		M 29
	Hubynykha		M 29
	Pishchanka (Novomoskovsk)		M 30
	Zaporizhzhia		H 08 • H 15
	Melitopol		M 14
	Chonhar Strait	One of three road bridges to the Crimean peninsula	
	Dzhankoi		M 17
	Simferopol		H 05 • H 06
682 km	Yalta		H 19

== See also ==
- Roads in Ukraine
- Ukraine Highways
- International E-road network
- Pan-European corridors
