= Aksay Bridge =

Bridge in Russia

Coordinates: 47.2419°N 39.8511°E

The Bridge of Aksay
- Аксайский мост (Russian)
- Location within Rostov Oblast
- Type: Road bridge
- Location: Rostov-on-Don, Russia
- Nearest city: Aksay

History
- Built: 1964
- Rebuilt: 2014–2015

The Bridge of Aksay (Russian: Аксайский мост) is a road bridge over the River Don in Rostov-on-Don. Its total span is 580 m (1,900 ft). It was built in 1964 to form part of the 1,062 km (660 mi) M4 "Don" highway, with a two-lane capacity of around 7,000 vehicles per day of up to 6 tonnes per axle. In 1995, a new bridge was built to augment the existing one to accommodate a new three-lane crossing. The bridge crosses the Don 60 km (37 mi) from its estuary.

== Name ==
The bridge is named after nearby Aksay, Rostov Oblast. The town is in turn named after the River Aksay, a tributary of the Don. The river's name derives from legends about quick or white water.

== Reconstruction and overhaul ==
In September 2014, the reconstruction of the two-lane part of the bridge was completed at a cost of 2.84 billion rubles (approximately US$37 million). The project required dismantling the right side of the existing bridge and building a new bridge in its place. According to the project documentation, the new bridge crossing would be 1,227.7 m (4,028 ft) long and 56.11 m (184.1 ft) wide, with three lanes. This new crossing was opened on 1 November 2014. Overhaul of the newer left side of the bridge started on 25 February 2015, and was completed in the July. But the approach road from the "MEGA" shopping centre in Rostov-on-Don is still in a bad state.
