= Highway H05 (Ukraine) =

Highway in Crimea

Highway H05
- Автошлях Н05
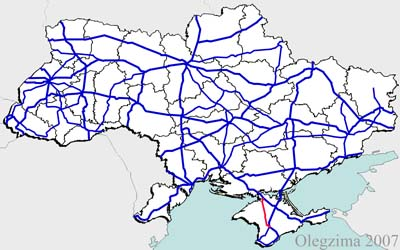

Route information
- Length: 115.0 km (71.5 mi)

Major junctions
- north end: M 17 in Krasnoperekopsk
- south end: M 18 in Simferopol

Location
- Country: Ukraine
- Regions: Crimea

Highway system
- Roads in Ukraine; State Highways
← H 04	→ H 06

H05 is a regional road (H-Highway) in Crimea, Ukraine. It runs north-south and connects Krasnoperekopsk with Simferopol. Since the 2014 annexation of Crimea by the Russian Federation, the route was given another code 35K-001.

== Main route ==
Main route and connections to/intersections with other highways in Ukraine.

Marker	Main settlements	Notes	Highway Interchanges
Crimea
	Ishun • Krasnoperekopsk		M 17
	Vorontsovka		
	Voikovo		
	Hvardiyske • Krasna Zorka		
	Ukromne • Aeroflotsky		
115.0 km	Simferopol		Simferopol train station

== See also ==
- Roads in Ukraine
