= H19 =

H19 or H-19 may refer to:

- H19 (gene), a maternally-transmitted human gene
- British NVC community H19, a type of heath community in the British National Vegetation Classification
- Heathkit H19, a serial terminal used with the Heathkit H8 microcomputer
- Highway H19 (Ukraine)
- HMS H19, an H-class submarine ordered by but not commissioned into the Royal Navy
- HMS Harpy (H19), a Royal Navy Beagle-class destroyer
- HMS Harvester (H19), a Royal Navy H-class destroyer
- London Buses route H19, a public transportation route in London, England
- Sikorsky H-19, an American helicopter
