= Highway M29 (Ukraine) =

Highway in Ukraine

Highway M29
- Автошлях М29
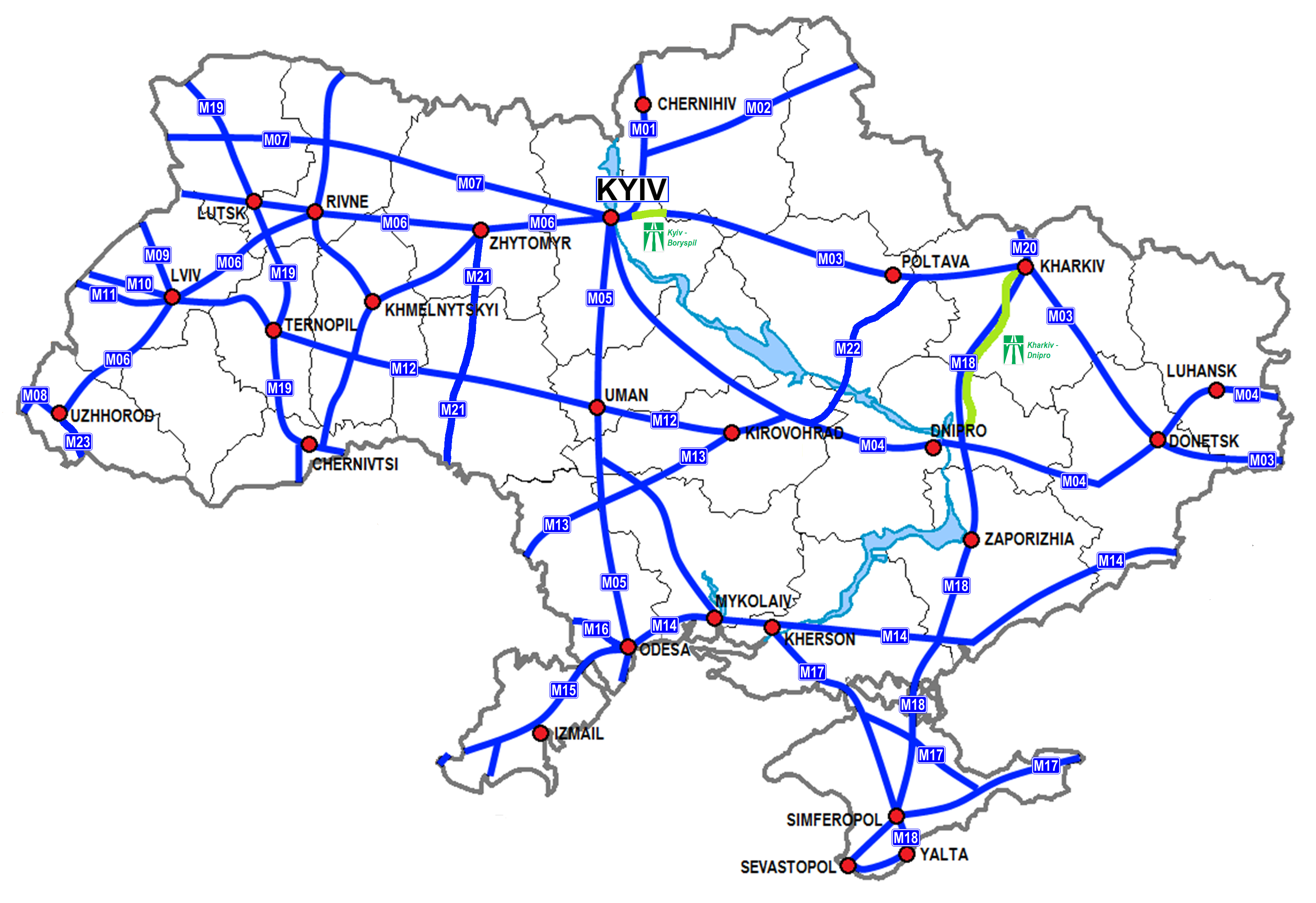
- Road M29 (marked green on the right side of the map)

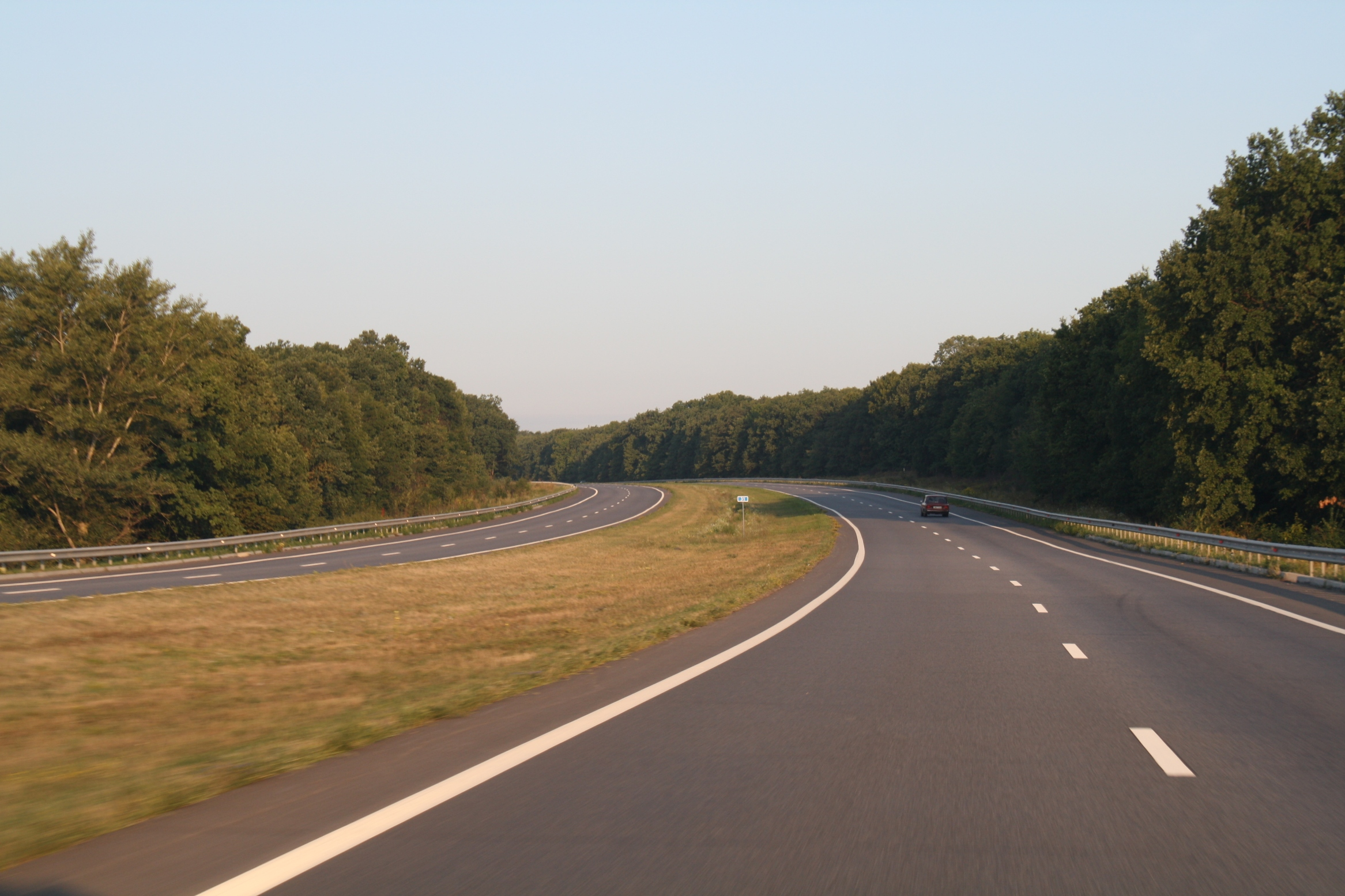

Route information
- Part of E105
- Length: 160.7 km (99.9 mi)

Major junctions
- North end: M 03 in Liubotyn
- South end: M 30 in Novomoskovsk

Location
- Country: Ukraine
- Oblasts: Kharkiv, Dnipropetrovsk

Highway system
- Roads in Ukraine; State Highways
| ← M 28 | → M 30 |

M29 is a Ukrainian international highway (M-highway) in eastern Ukraine that runs from Kharkiv to Dnipro parallel to the M18. It is also known as Kharkiv – Dnipro motorway, although it does not have an official motorway designation. The entire route is part of European route E105.

== Main route ==
Main route and connections to/intersections with other highways in Ukraine.

| Marker | Main settlements | Notes | Highway Interchanges |
|---|---|---|---|
| 0 km | Liubotyn | | M 03 |
| | Nova Vodolaha | | M 18 |
| | Oktyabrske | | M 18 |
| | Natalyne | | M 18 • P79 |
| 157.9 (160.7)* | Hubynykha | | M 18 |

- - with intersection

== Gallery ==
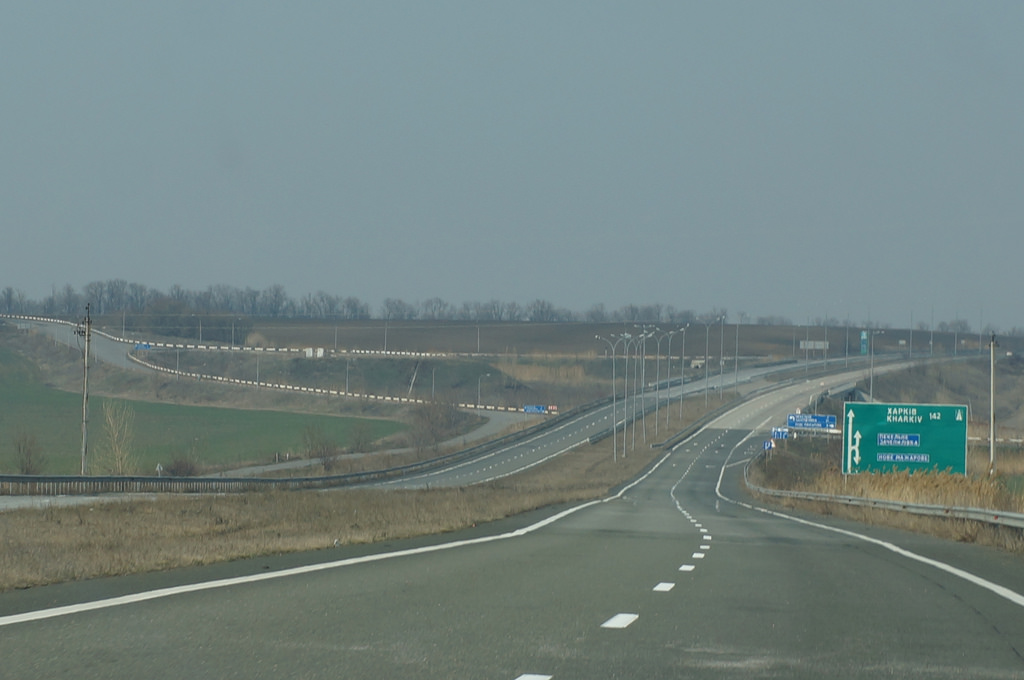
M29 motorway in Kharkiv Oblast

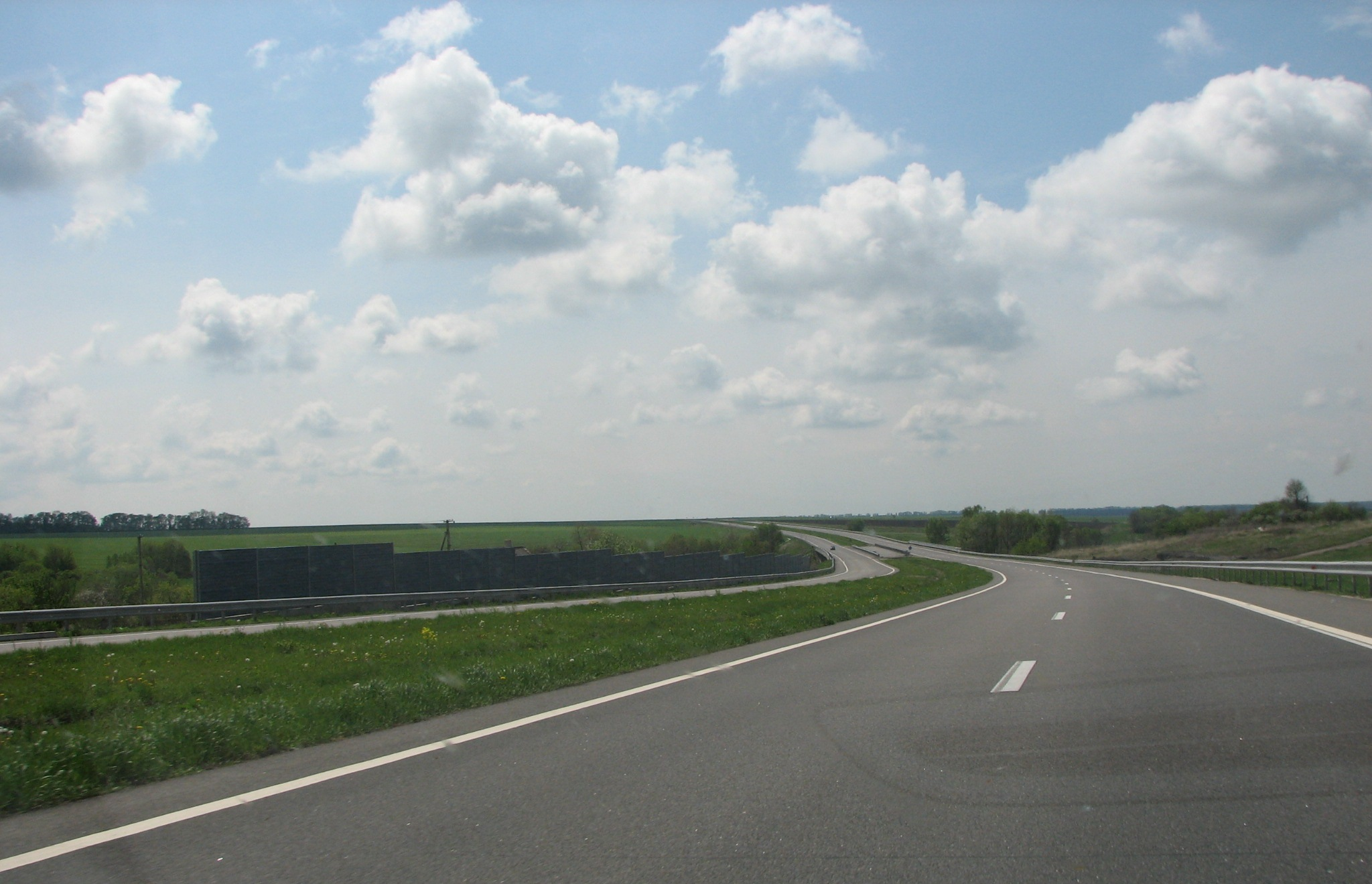
Kharkiv-Dnipro Motorway

== See also ==
- Roads in Ukraine
- Ukraine Highways
- International E-road network
- Pan-European corridors

== Sources ==
- Про затвердження переліку автомобільних доріг загального користування державного значення (in Ukrainian). КАБІНЕТ МІНІСТРІВ УКРАЇНИ ПОСТАНОВА від 16 вересня 2015 р. № 712. 2015.
- Стан проїзду (in Ukrainian). Державне агентство автомобільних доріг України. 2016. Archived from the original on 2016-03-10.
- Автодороги Украины. Список, маршрут, расстояние (in Russian). Автодороги Украины. 2016.
