= Highway H06 (Ukraine) =

Highway in Crimea

Highway H06
- Автошлях Н06
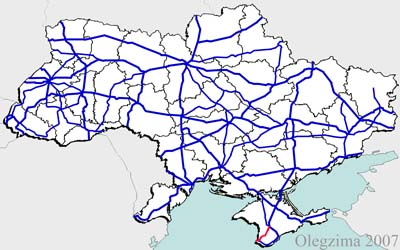

Route information
- Length: 66.4 km (41.3 mi)

Major junctions
- northeast end: M 18 in Simferopol
- southwest end: H 19 in Sevastopol

Location
- Country: Ukraine
- Regions: Crimea, Sevastopol

Highway system
- Roads in Ukraine; State Highways
← H 05	→ H 07

H06 is a regional road (H-Highway) in Crimea and Sevastopol. It runs northeast-south-southwest and connects Simferopol with Sevastopol. Since the 2014 annexation of Crimea by the Russian Federation, the route was given another code 35P-001 and 67P-1 (within Sevastopol).

== Main route ==
Main route and connections to/intersections with other highways in Ukraine.

Marker	Main settlements	Notes	Highway Interchanges
Crimea
	Simferopol		M 18
	Novopavlivka		
	Bakhchysarai		
	Siren		
Sevastopol
	Fruktove		
66.4 km	Oktyabrsky • Sakharna Holovka		

== See also ==
- Roads in Ukraine
