= Yeni Həyat, Shamkir =

Yeni Həyat is a village and municipality in the Shamkir Rayon of Azerbaijan. It has a population of 3490.
