= A290 highway (Russia) =

Road in Russia

Federal Highway A290
- Федеральная автомобильная дорога А290
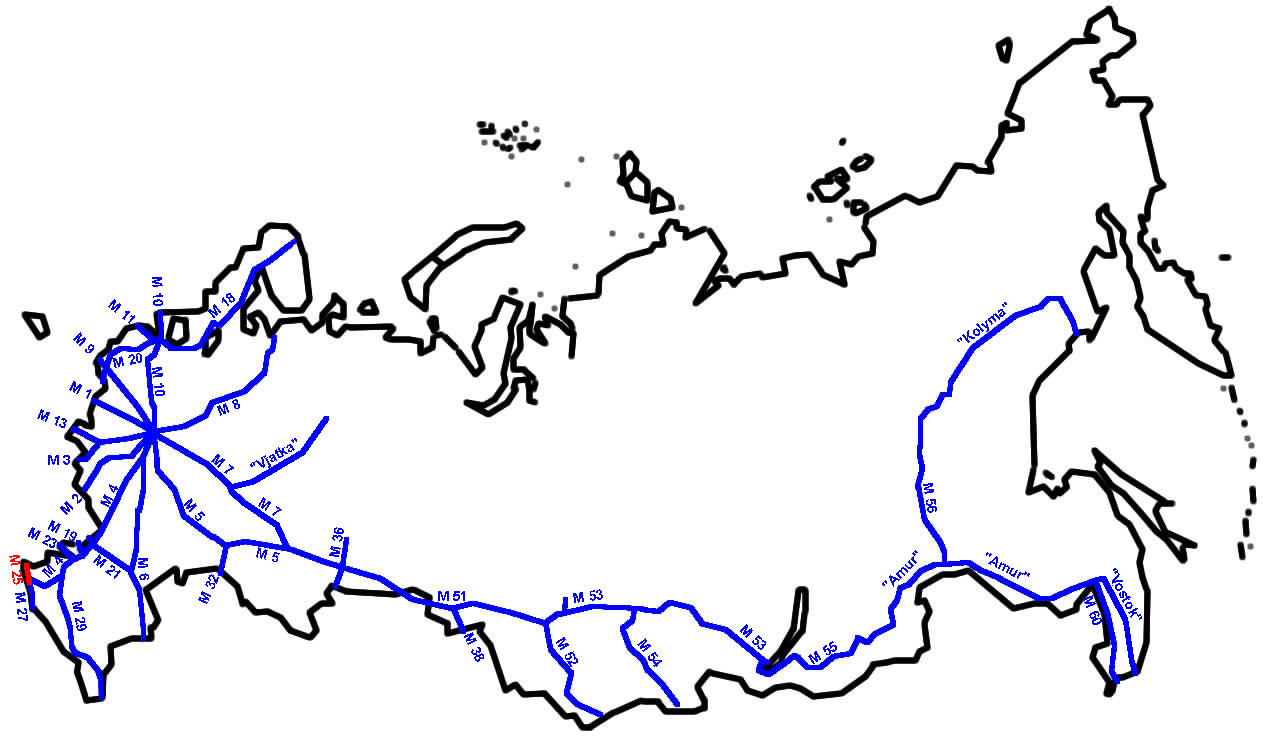

Route information
- Part of E97
- Length: 175 km (109 mi)

Major junctions
- East end: M 4 in Novorossiysk

- West end: M 17 and A 291 in Kerch

Location
- Country: Russia

Highway system
- Russian Federal Highways
| ← A 289 | → A 291 |

The A290, before 2018 also known as M25, is a federal road in Russia that runs east–west along the northeast shore of the Black Sea from Novorossiysk to Port Kavkaz, and, via the Crimean Bridge, to Kerch in Crimea. The entire route is part of European route E97.

== Route description ==
The road passes through the plains of the Black Sea north of the Caucasus Mountains. No large rivers intersect this road, with very few small bridges. Several sections of the road require more attention of the drivers. Descents and climbs await at the following sites - 270 km, 280 km and 300 km, 352 km and 353 km, 356 km. Visibility 250 m, in the region of 264 km and 352 km.

=== Municipalities ===
Novorossiysk, Verkhnebakansky, Natuhaevskaya, Anapa, Yurovka, Starotitarovskaya, Sennoy, Kerch.

=== Attractions ===
Novorossiysk is a city with a population of 242 thousand inhabitants, located on the shore of the bay Tsemess. A major trading port. The cove was owned by Greeks, the Genoese and the Turks, who built a fortress Sudzhuk-Calais there. During the Russian-Turkish war it was destroyed and a Russian fort was established. Thus began the history of the city of Novorossiysk.

Anapa is the second-largest city on the route, a seaside resort. Anapa is known for vineyards and horticulture.
