= European route E97 =

Road in trans-European E-road network

E97

Route information
- Length: 1,360 km (850 mi)

Major junctions
- North-West end: Kherson, Ukraine
- South-East end: Aşkale, Turkey

Location
- Countries: Ukraine; Russia; Georgia; Turkey

Highway system
- International E-road network; A Class; B Class

European route E 97 is an A-class European Route in Ukraine, Russia, Georgia, and Turkey. The highway runs for 1,360 kilometres (850 mi) in total. It connects the North Black Sea region with the South Black Sea region along the eastern shores of the sea.

== Route description ==
The E97 starts in the Ukrainian city of Kherson and proceeds to the Georgian city of Poti, intersected by a number of European routes. From Khershon it proceeds along M17. The road soon passes into the territory of Crimea (annexed by Russia), where it runs from Dzhankoy – Feodosiya – Kerch, and is then interrupted by the Strait of Kerch. The road used the now discontinued Kerch Strait ferry line between Port Krym, Ukraine and Port Kavkaz, Russia, but in 2018 the Crimean Bridge opened connecting Crimea and Russia by road (A290).

Since 2014 annexation of Crimea by Russia, a part of the road located on the peninsula is de facto operated by Russia, which designated that portion of the highway as two regional routes of the Republic of Crimea. During the 2022 Russian invasion of Ukraine, Russia took direct control of areas of the road in Kherson Oblast.

In Russia, the E97 heads to Novorossiysk, along the M4 to Dzhubga and finally via the M27 motorway to resort city of Sochi, site of the 2014 Winter Olympics. Further south, the route proceeds through Georgia, passing through Sukhumi, Poti and Batumi before reaching the Turkish border. From there, it extends to Trabzon, Gümüşhane and Aşkale, where the E97 terminates. Between Trabzon and Poti, the E97 is concurrent with the easternmost segment of the European route E70.

== Roads ==
Ukraine

- M 17: Kherson ( E58) - Kalanchak

Crimea ( (Ukraine) (Russia) occupied territory)

- M 17 (Russia call it 35A-001 and 35K-001): Krasnoperekopsk - Dzhankoy ( E105) - Feodosia
- A 291: Feodosia - Kerch

Kerch Strait

- A 290 (Crimean Bridge) Kerch - Novorossiysk

Russia

- M 4: Novorossiysk ( E115) - Dzhubga ( E592)
- A 147: Dzhubga ( E592) - Sochi

Georgia

- ს 1: (under Abkhazia control) Leselidze - Sokhumi - Gali
- ს 1: Zugdidi - Senaki ( E60)
- ს 2: Senaki ( E60) - Poti ( E60, Start of Concurrency of E70) - Grigoleti ( E692) - Batumi - Sarpi

Turkey

- D.010: Sarp - Rize - Trabzon (End of Concurrency of E70)
- D.885: Trabzon - Gümüşhane
- D.050: Gümüşhane - Bayburt
- D.915: Bayburt - Aşkale ( E80)
