= Yeni Həyat, Qusar =

Human settlement in Azerbaijan

Yeni Həyat is a village and municipality in the Qusar Rayon of Azerbaijan. It has a population of 1,004. The municipality consists of the villages of Yeni Həyat and Ləngi.
