= European route E115 =

Road in trans-European E-road network

E115

Route information
- Length: 1,745 km (1,084 mi)

Major junctions
- North end: Yaroslavl
- Moscow; Voronezh; Rostov-on-Don
- South end: Novorossiysk

Location
- Countries: Russia

Highway system
- International E-road network; A Class; B Class

European Route E115 is a European B class road lying entirely in Russia, connecting Yaroslavl to Novorossiysk. It does not pass through any other countries.

== Route ==
Russia

- M 8: Yaroslavl - Moscow
- MKAD: Moscow
- M4: (Concurrent with E119) Moscow - Kashira
- M 4: Kashira - Voronezh ( E38) - Kamensk-Shakhtinsky ( E40) - Shakhty (Start of concurrency with E50) Rostov-on-Don ( E58) - Pavlovskaya (End of concurrency with E50) - Krasnodar ( E592)
- A 146: Krasnodar ( E592) - Verkhnebakansk
- A 290: Verkhnebakansk - Novorossiysk ( E97)
