= Ləngi =

- Location within Azerbaijan
- Coordinates: 41°33′33″N 48°32′31″E
- Country: Azerbaijan
- Rayon: Qusar
- Municipality: Yeni Həyat
- Time zone: UTC+4 (AZT)
  - Summer (DST): UTC+5 (AZT)

Ləngi is a village in the Qusar Rayon of Azerbaijan. The village forms part of the municipality of Yeni Həyat.
