= European route E119 =

Road in trans-European E-road network

E119

Route information
- Length: 2,627 km (1,632 mi)

Major junctions
- North end: Moscow, Russia
- South end: Astara, Azerbaijan

Location
- Countries: Russia, Azerbaijan

Highway system
- International E-road network; A Class; B Class

E119 is a European B class road in Russia and Azerbaijan, connecting the cities Moscow - Astrakhan - Baku - Makhachkala - Astara, near the border with Iran.

== Route ==
Russia

- M 4: (Concurrent with E115) Moscow - Kashira
- R 22: Kashira - Tambov - Borisoglebsk ( E38) - Volgograd (Start of Concurrency with E40) - Astrakhan (End of Concurrency E40)
- R 215: Astrakhan ( E40) - Kochubey - Kizlyar - Mahachkala ( E50)
- R 217: Mahachkala ( E50) - Yarag-Kazmalyar (border with Azerbaijan)

Azerbaijan

- M 1: (border with Russia) Samur - Sumgayit - Baku
- Bakı Dairəvi Yolu: Baku
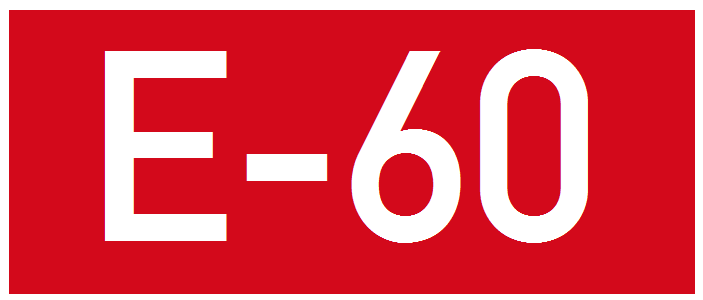
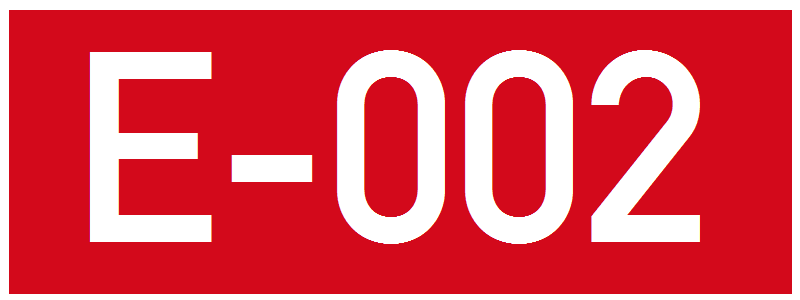
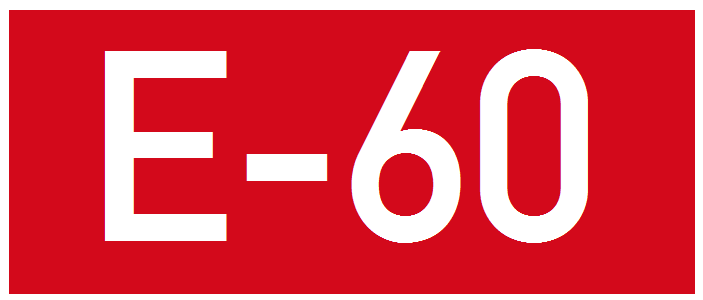
- M 2: Baku (Start of Concurrency with E60) - Ələt ( E002, End of Concurrency with E60)
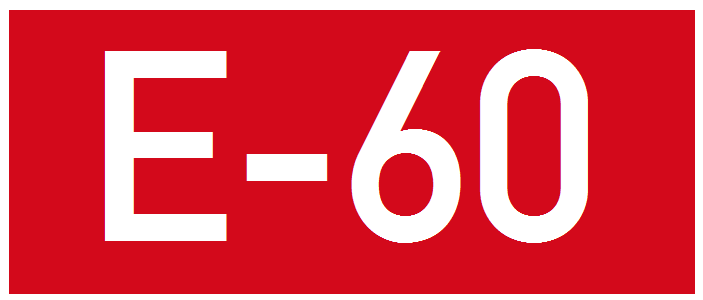
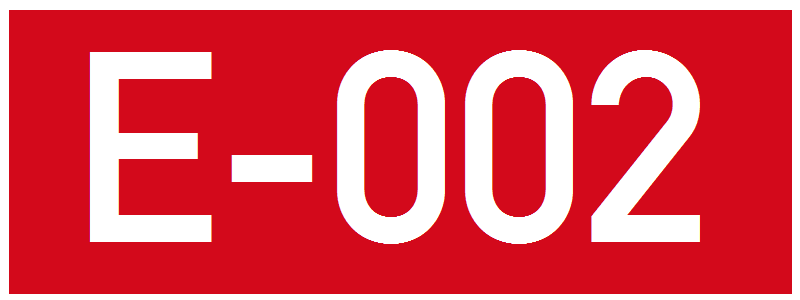
- M 3: Ələt ( E60 E002) - Biləsuvar - Astara

Iran

- Road 49: Astara
