= Timiryazev, Azerbaijan =

Village and municipality in Quba Rayon, Azerbaijan

Coordinates: 41°22′N 48°34′E

Timiryazev is a village and municipality in the Quba Rayon of Azerbaijan. It has a population of 1,322.
