= Maden, Bayburt =

Maden
- Village
- Location within Turkey
- Country: Turkey
- Province: Bayburt
- District: Bayburt
- Population (2021): 162
- Time zone: UTC+3 (TRT)

Maden is a village in the Bayburt District, Bayburt Province, Turkey. Its population is 162 (2021).

== Background ==
The village is also known as "Madenhanları" during the Republic of Turkey period. According to the census book in which the male population was determined in 1835, there were 13 men living in 5 households in the village of Ispir district at that time, where all the inhabitants were Muslims. It was connected to Bayburt with an arrangement made in 1872.
