= Yeni Həyat, Khachmaz =

Yeni Həyat
- Municipality
- Location within Azerbaijan
- Coordinates: 41°32′42″N 48°36′49″E
- Country: Azerbaijan
- Rayon: Khachmaz

Population (2008)
  - Total: 3,503
- Time zone: UTC+4 (AZT)
  - Summer (DST): UTC+5 (AZT)

Yeni Həyat (also, Yeni-Khayat) is a village and municipality in the Khachmaz Rayon of Azerbaijan. It has a population of 3,503.
