= Highway H19 (Ukraine) =

Highway in Crimea

Highway H19
- Автошлях Н19
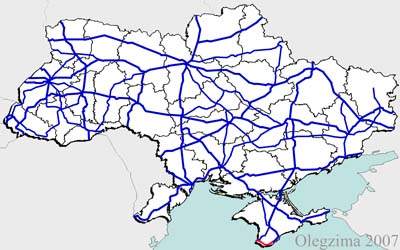

Route information
- Length: 80.7 km (50.1 mi)

Major junctions
- east end: Yalta
- west end: H 06 in Sevastopol

Location
- Country: Ukraine
- Oblasts: Crimea, Sevastopol

Highway system
- Roads in Ukraine; State Highways
← H 18	→ H 20

H19 is a regional road (H-Highway) in Crimea and Sevastopol, Ukraine. It is a western part of the so-called Yuzhnoberezhne shose (South-coastal highway). It runs east–west and connects Yalta with Sevastopol. Since the 2014, annexation of Crimea by the Russian Federation, the route was given another code 35K-002 and 67K-1 (within Sevastopol).

== Main route ==
Main route and connections to/intersections with other highways in Ukraine.

Marker	Main settlements	Notes	Highway Interchanges
Crimea
	Yalta		
	Vynohradne		
	Oreanda		
	Koreiz		
	Kasymivka		
	Sanatorne	tunnel	
Sevastopol
	Laspi		
	Laspi Pass	tunnel	
	Tylove		
	Honcharne		
	Khmelnytske		
80.7 km	Sevastopol		

== See also ==
- Roads in Ukraine
