= Samur, Azerbaijan =

Samur
- Municipality
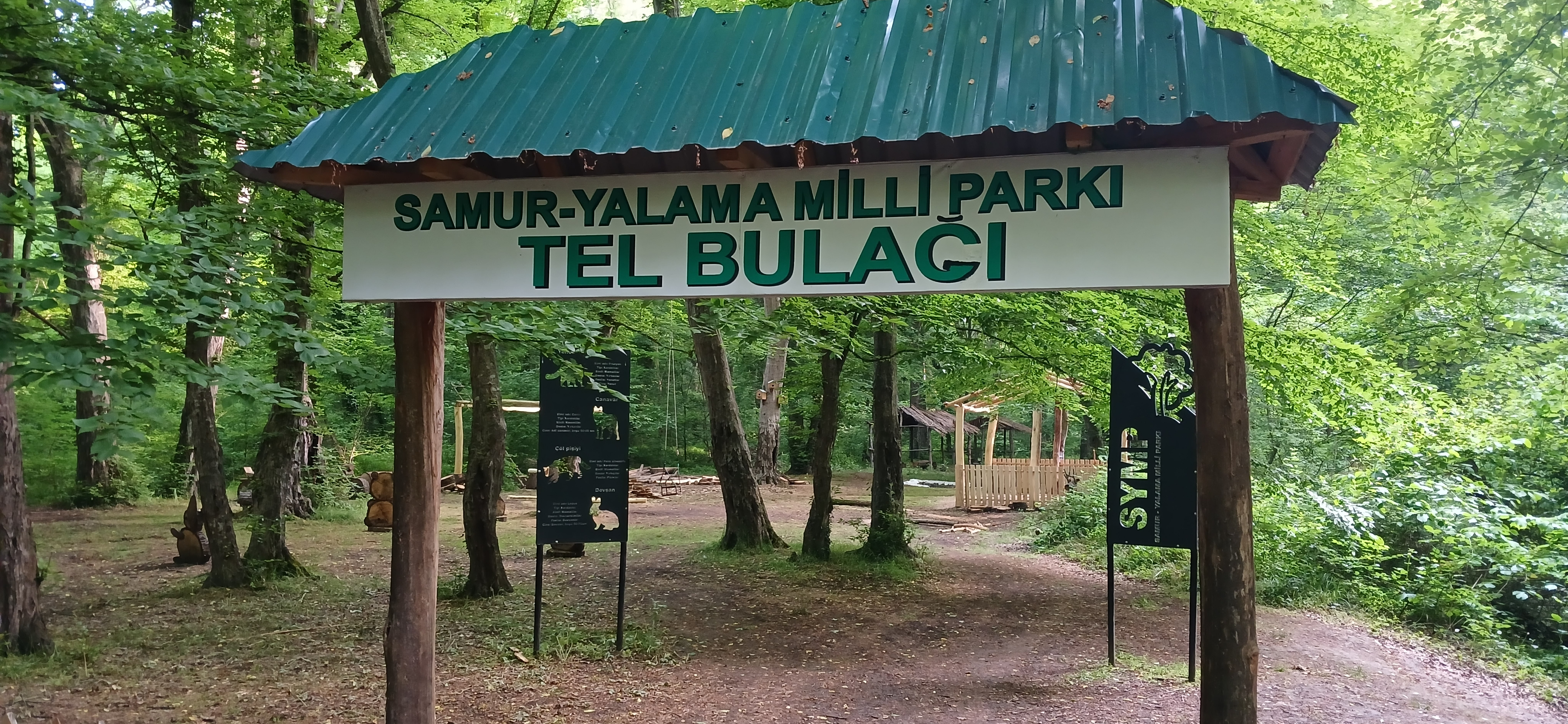
- Samur-Yalama National Park

- Location within Azerbaijan
- Coordinates: 41°37′52″N 48°25′36″E
- Country: Azerbaijan
- Rayon: Qusar

Population
  - Total: 2,388
- Time zone: UTC+4 (AZT)
  - Summer (DST): UTC+5 (AZT)

Samur is a village and municipality in the Qusar Rayon of Azerbaijan. It has a population of 2,388 and is named after the river which forms part of the Azerbaijan–Russia border. Samur is itself the nearest village to the SDK border crossing where the M1 highway crosses into Russia. This border crossing is the only legal road crossing between the two nations though there is also a railway crossing at Yalama. Both are open to CIS citizens only.

== Transport ==
- Road

Guba-Samur(Azerbaijan-Russia border) Toll Road.

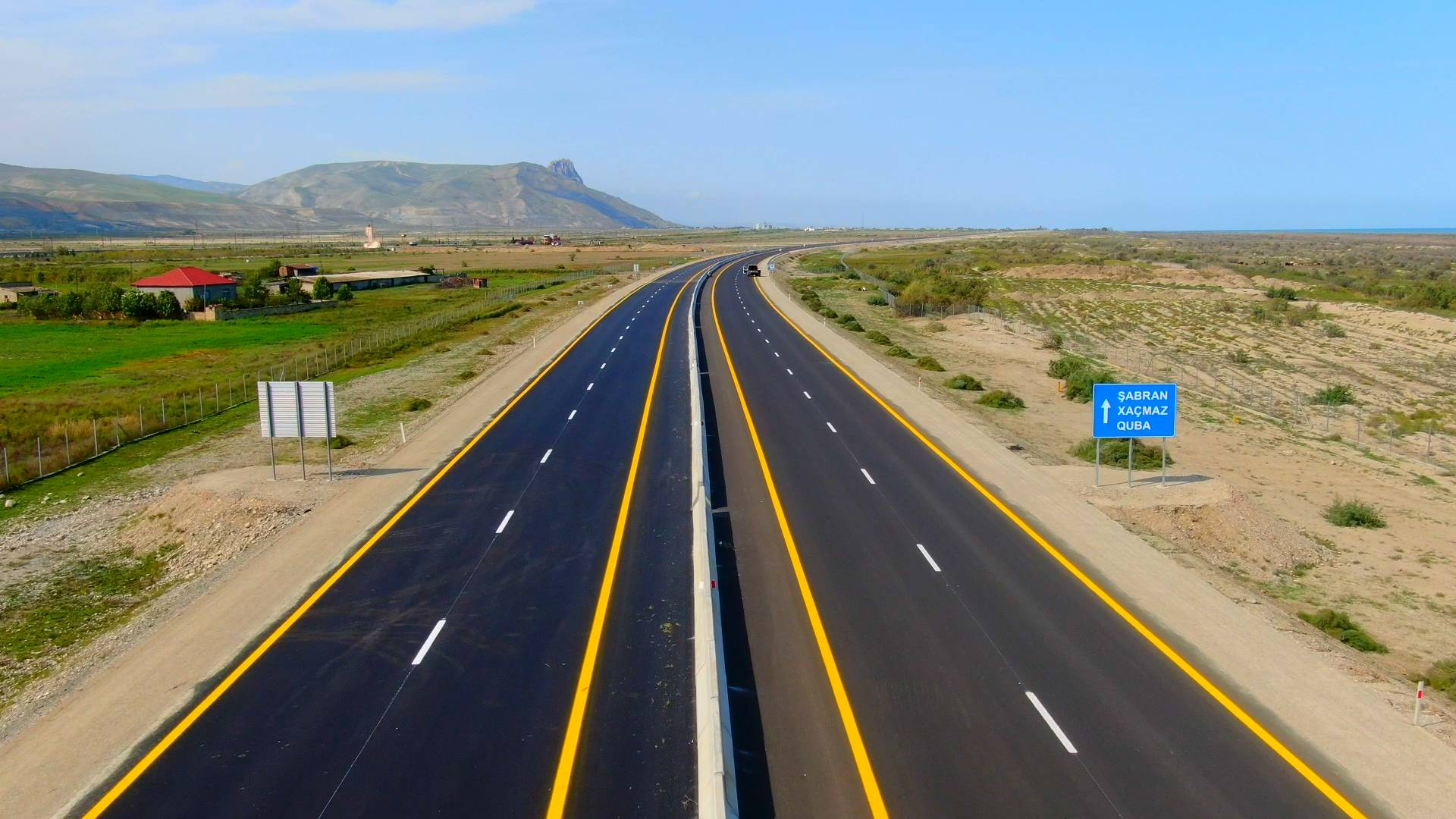
Guba-Samur(Azerbaijan-Russia border) Toll Road

- Rail

The Samur railway critical infrastructure enhancements, specifically the planned Samur-II railway station near the Russian-Azerbaijani border, aimed at boosting capacity along the North-South Transport Corridor (INSTC).
