= Dzhubga =

Dzhubga Джyбга
- Urban-type settlement
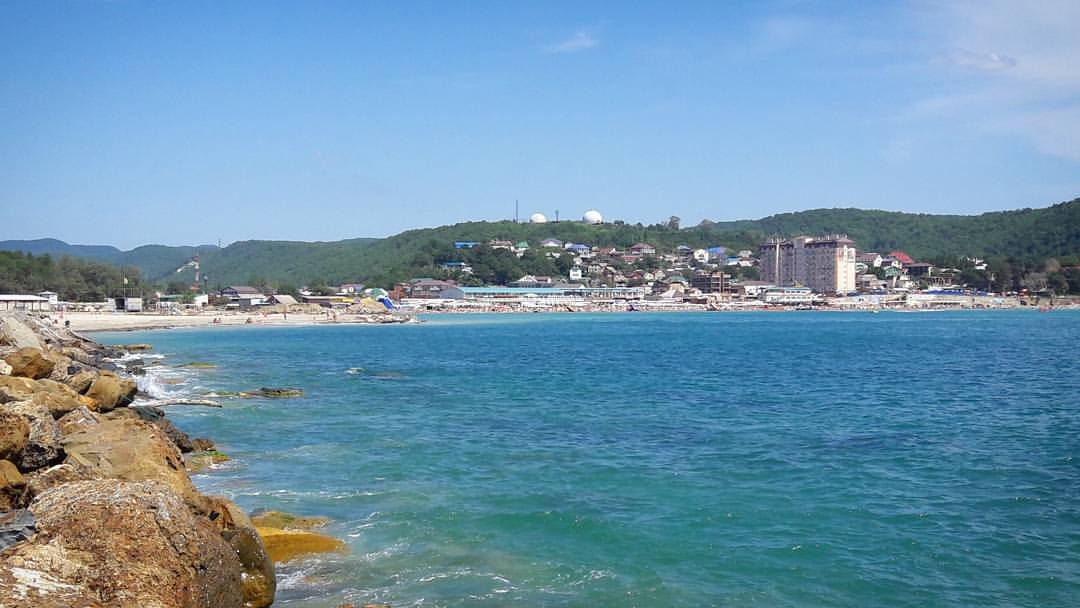
- View of Dzhubga

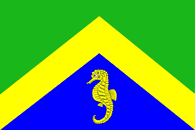
- Flag
- Interactive map of Dzhubga
- Location of Dzhubga Dzhubga (European Russia) Dzhubga (Russia) Dzhubga (Black Sea)
- Coordinates: 44°18′N 38°42′E
- Country: Russia
- Federal subject: Krasnodar Krai
- Administrative district: Tuapsinsky District
- Founded: 1864
- Elevation: 7 m (23 ft)

Population (2010 Census)
  - Total: 5,223
  - Estimate (2023): 7,024 (+34.5%)
- Time zone: UTC+3 (MSK)
- Postal code: 352844
- OKTMO ID: 03655154051

Dzhubga (Russian: Джу́бга; Adyghe: Жьыбгъэ, Ẑəbġă which means "Wind"; Ukrainian: Джубга) is a seaside resort situated 57 km west of Tuapse in Krasnodar Krai, Russia.

Dzhubga is the starting point of the M27 highway. It is connected to the region's capital, Krasnodar, by a 108-kilometre-long (67 mi) highway that runs northward, passing through Adygeysk and Goryachy Klyuch.

In June 2007, Eni and Gazprom disclosed the South Stream project whereby a 900-kilometre-long (560 mi) offshore natural gas pipeline with annual capacity of 31 cubic kilometers is planned to cross the Black Sea from Dzhubga to Varna, en route to Italy and Austria.

== Geography ==
The settlement is located on the coast of Dzhubga Bay of the Black Sea, at the mouth of the Dzhubga River, in a forested area with both deciduous and coniferous trees. It is 52 km northwest of the district center, Tuapse. A highway (M4 and M27) runs from Krasnodar to Dzhubga via Adygeysk, Goryachy Klyuch, and Khrebtovy Pass, covering a distance of about 110 km.

The beaches in Dzhubga are mainly sandy and sand-pebble. There are auto campsites, auto tourist bases, and various recreation centers such as "Golubaya Bukhta" (Blue Bay), "Gorny Vozdukh" (Mountain Air), and "Inal." Additionally, various boarding houses are in operation.

== History ==
The township was established in 1864 on the site of a former Shapsug village as the Cossack stanitsa of Dzhubgskaya. It took its name from the Dzhubga River, which enters the Dzhubga Bay of the Black Sea. In 1904 was built the parochial school. During World War II it was used as a hospital. According to the 1926 census, the population was 59.0% Ukrainian, 25.9% Russian, and 4.5% Polish.

== Population ==
Population: 5,223 (2010 census); 5,246 (2002 census); 4,658 (1989 Soviet census). 815 (1926 Soviet census).
