= M4 highway (Russia) =

Federal highway in Russia

Federal Highway M4
- Федеральная автомобильная дорога М4
- Don

Route information
- Part of E50 E97 E115 E592

- Part of AH8
- Length: 1,517 km (943 mi)
- Existed: 1966–present

Major junctions
- North end: MKAD in Moscow
- South end: Novorossiysk

Location
- Country: Russia

Highway system
- Russian Federal Highways
← M 3	→ M 5

The Federal Automobile Road M-4 "Don" is a major expressway, trunk road that links Moscow, Voronezh, Rostov-na-Donu and Krasnodar. Its length is 1517 kilometres.

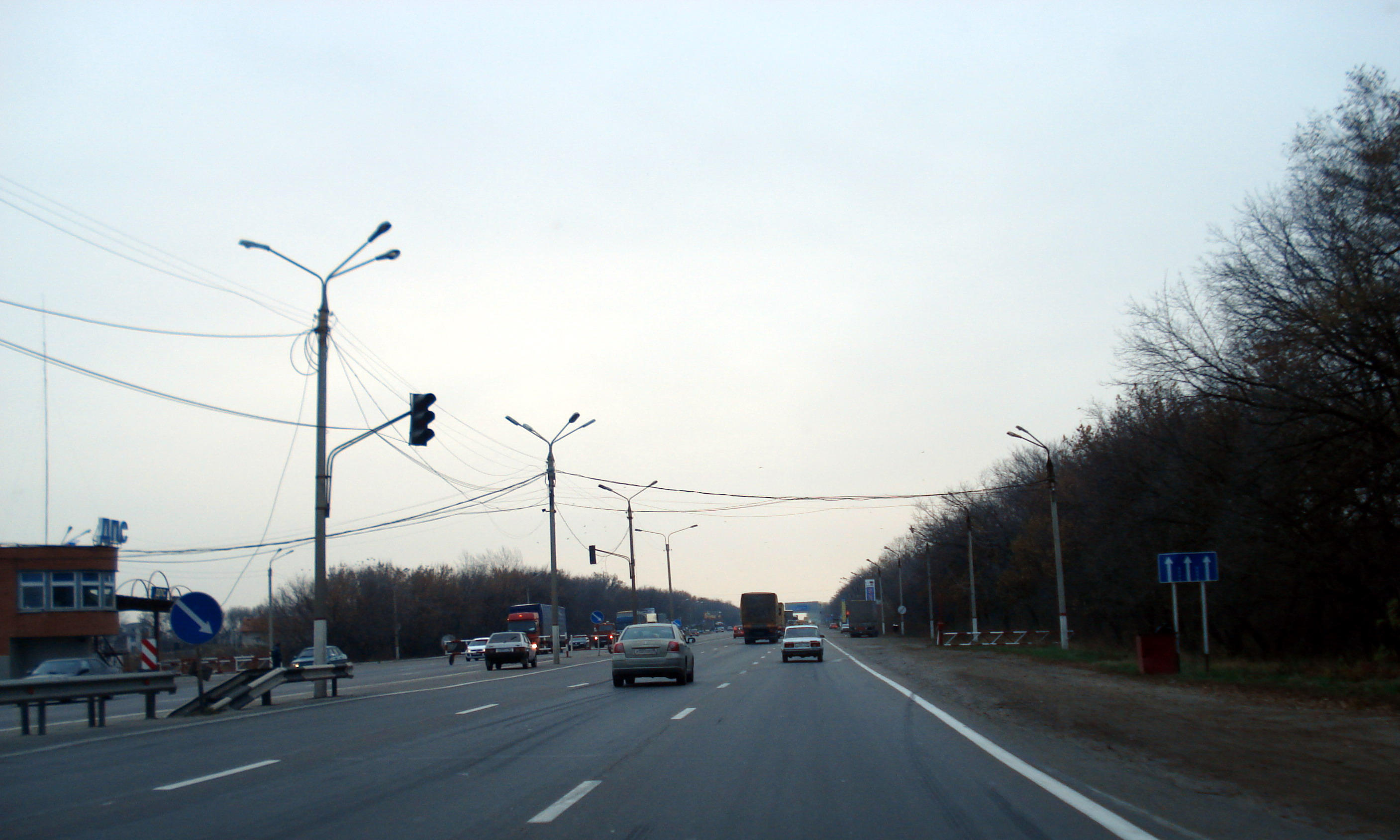
Highway "Don" in the south-east of Voronezh

The route starts at the Moscow Ring Road (as Kashira Highway) and runs south, passing west of Vidnoye, east of Domodedovo, west of Kashira and Stupino, where the Caspian Highway branches off to the east. The Don Highway continues across Tula Oblast east of Venev, through Bogoroditsk and Yefremov, then across Lipetsk Oblast, passing through Yelets and Zadonsk, and then across Voronezh Oblast, bypassing Voronezh and Boguchar. After crossing the Don River near Rostov, the road continues further south to Krasnodar and finishes at Novorossiysk.

The Don Road, extensively upgraded and widened in the 2000s–2010s into an expressway, is an artery connecting Moscow with Southern Russia. In the summer months, the road suffers from heavy traffic congestion caused by summer vacationers travelling to the Black Sea resorts like Sochi and by lorries transporting fruit from the southern provinces to the heavily populated areas of Central and Northern Russia.

M-4 is one of the first Russian national expressways. The road is partially tolled.

The Moscow-Krasnodar section is part of European route E115 and is concurrent with European route E119 from Moscow to Kashira. The Moscow-Kashira section is also part of AH8, the section in Rostov-on-Don is part of European route E50, the Dzhubga-Novossiysk section is part of European route E97 and the Krasnodar-Dzhubga section is part of European route E592.

During the Wagner Group rebellion, the M4 was used by Wagner Group forces in their attempt to march to Moscow. Control over the highway was contested between Wagner Group and the Russian army, with unconfirmed reports of Russian army helicopters firing on Wagner military convoys.
