= Battle of Narva =

Battle of Narva may refer to:

- Siege of Narva (1558), a battle between Livonia and Russia, part of the Livonian War
- Siege of Narva (1581), a battle between Sweden and Russia, part of the Livonian War
- Siege of Narva (1590) a battle between Sweden and Russia, part of the Russo-Swedish War (1590–1595)
- Battle of Narva (1700), a battle between Sweden and Russia, part of the Great Northern War
- Siege of Narva (1704), a battle between Sweden and Russia, part of the Great Northern War
- Battle of Narva (1918), the starting event of the Estonian War of Independence between Estonia and Soviet Russia
- Battle of Utria, a battle between Estonia and Soviet Russia in January 1919
- Battle of Krivasoo, a battle between Estonia and Soviet Russia in November and December 1919
- Bombing of Narva in World War II, aerial campaign by the Soviet Union against German-occupied Estonia, part of World War II
- Battle of Narva (1944), between Germany and the Soviet Union, part of World War II
  - First phase: Battle for Narva Bridgehead
  - Second phase: Battle for Tannenberg Line
