= European route E105 =

Road in trans-European E-road network

E105

Route information
- Length: 3,770 km (2,340 mi)

Major junctions
- North end: Kirkenes, Norway
- South end: Yalta, Crimea

Location
- Countries: Norway, Russia, Ukraine

Highway system
- International E-road network; A Class; B Class

E105 is part of the International E-road network, which is a series of main roads in Europe. It is a north–south reference road, meaning it crosses Europe from north to south, and other E-road numbers have been calculated based on these reference roads. It starts in the very northernmost tip of Norway, then crosses through much of western Russia and eastern Ukraine before terminating in the disputed Crimean Peninsula.

== Description ==
E105 starts from Hesseng, (just south of Kirkenes), Norway and runs along Russia's R21, M10, M2: Ukraine's M20, M29, and M18 to Yalta, Crimea (Russian-occupied territory of Ukraine). Russians call this the Crimea Highway (Крымское шоссе), and de facto officially marked Republic of Crimea section as 35А-002. During the 2022 Russian invasion of Ukraine, Russia took direct control of the whole section of the road in Kherson Oblast and a part of the Zaporizhzhia Oblast section.

== Route ==
Norway

- Kirkenes ( E6)

Russia

- R 21: border with Norway - Pechenga - Murmansk - Petrozavodsk - Saint Petersburg
- M 10: Saint Petersburg - Veliky Novgorod - Tver - Moscow
- MKAD: within Moscow
- M 2: Moscow - Tula - Oryol - Kursk - Belgorod - border with Ukraine

Ukraine

- M 20: border with Russia - Kharkiv ( E40)
- M 18: Kharkiv - Hubynykha - Zaporizhia - Melitopol

Crimea (disputed between Russia/Ukraine)

- 35A-002/ M 18: Dzhankoy ( E97) - Simferopol - Alushta - Yalta

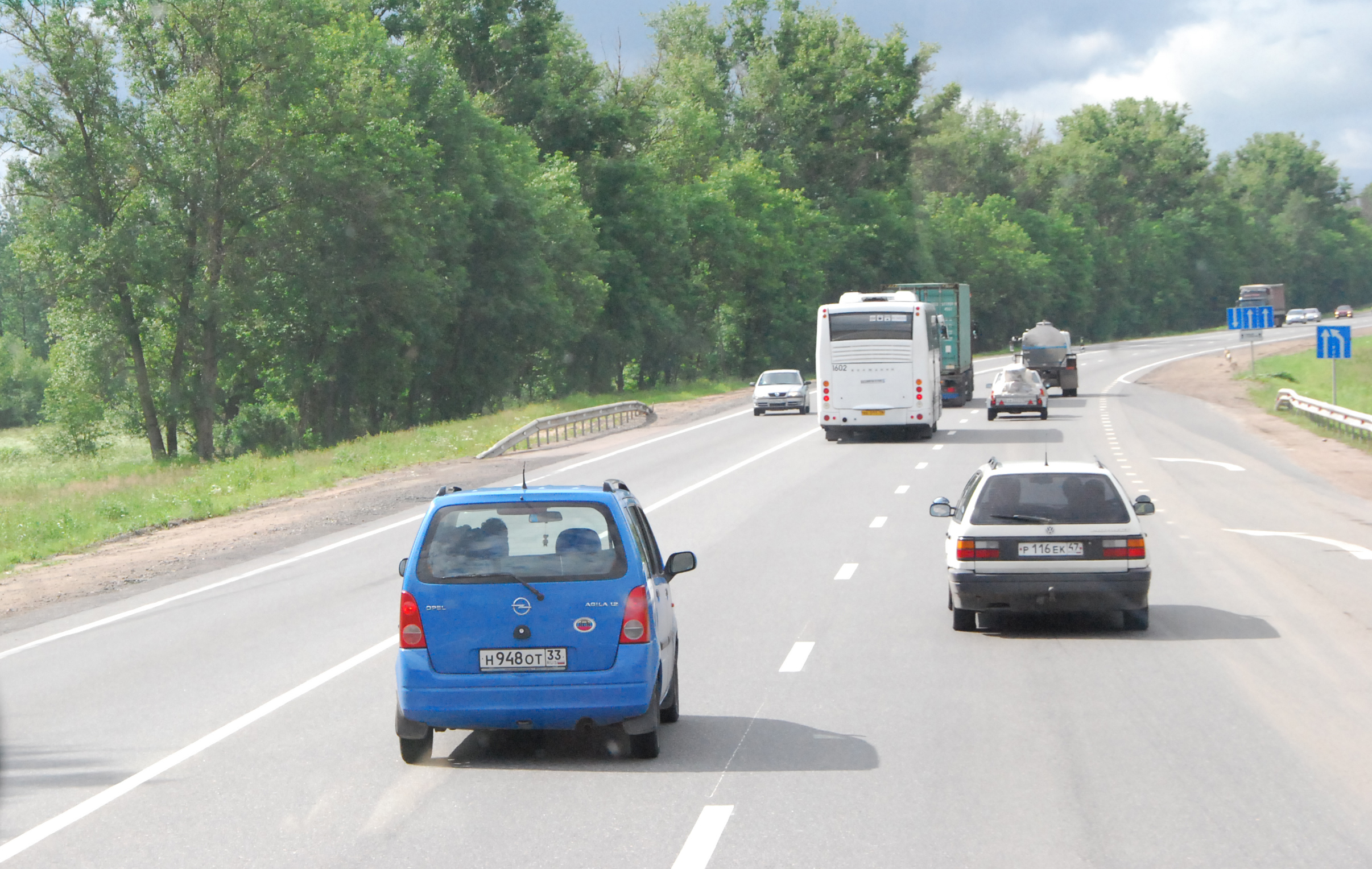
On the way from Saint Petersburg to Moscow, in the suburbs of Veliky Novgorod. Except near the big cities, the highway is basically a two-lane highway (one lane for each direction), with an occasional third center lane for passing or left turn near the crossing.

== Gallery ==
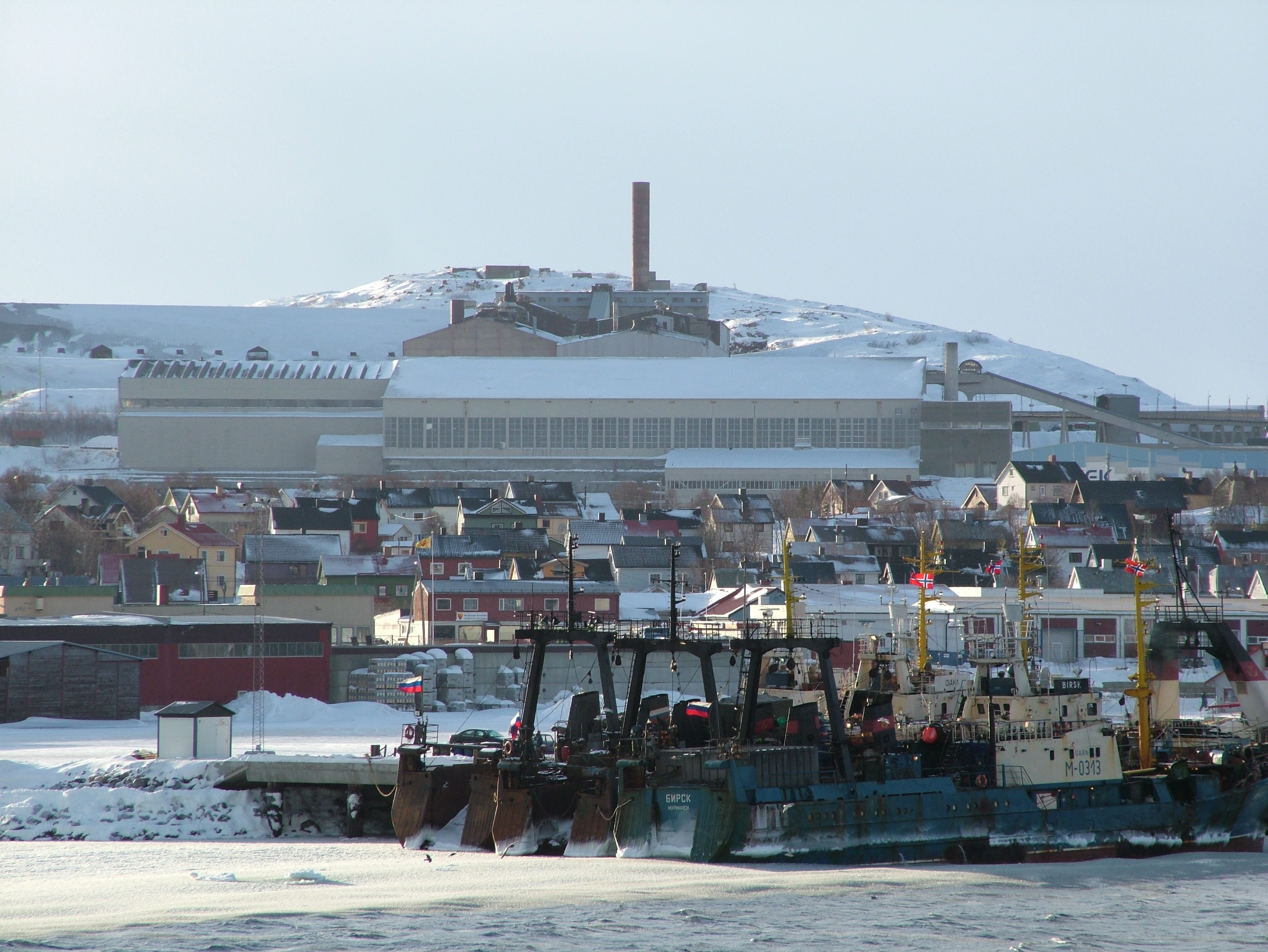
Kirkenes (Norway)

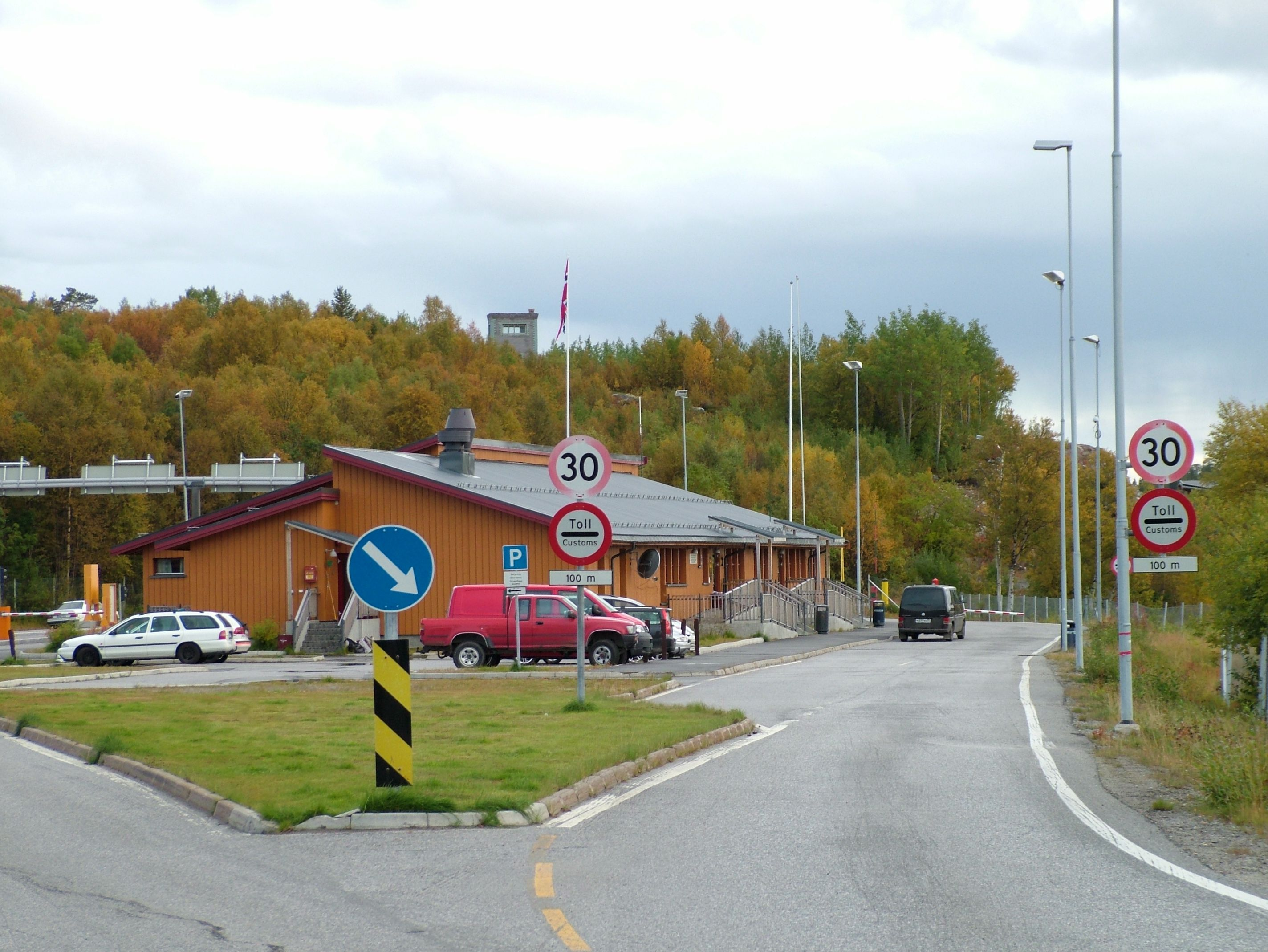
Border control Norway-Russia

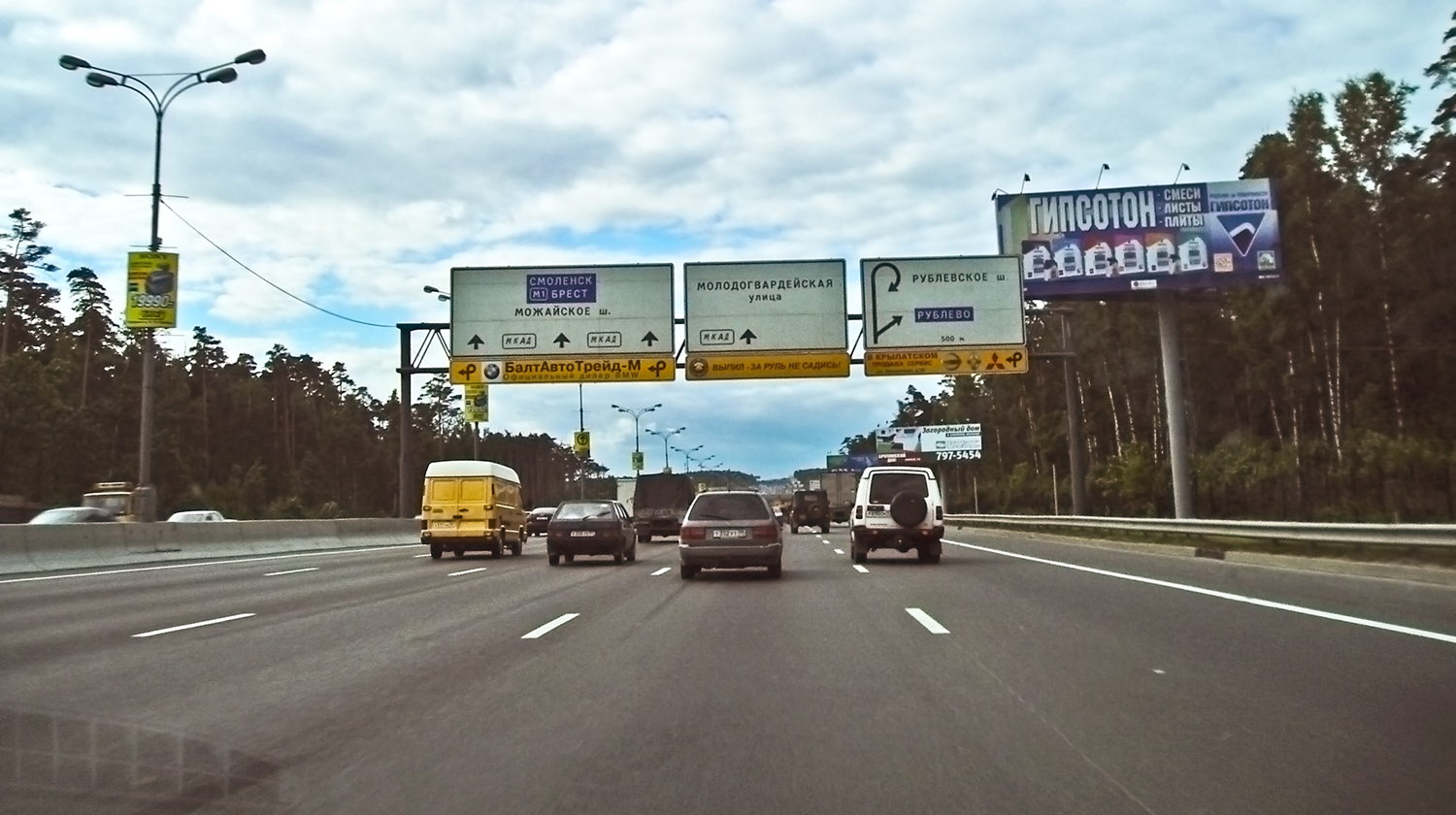
MKAD in Moscow (Russia)

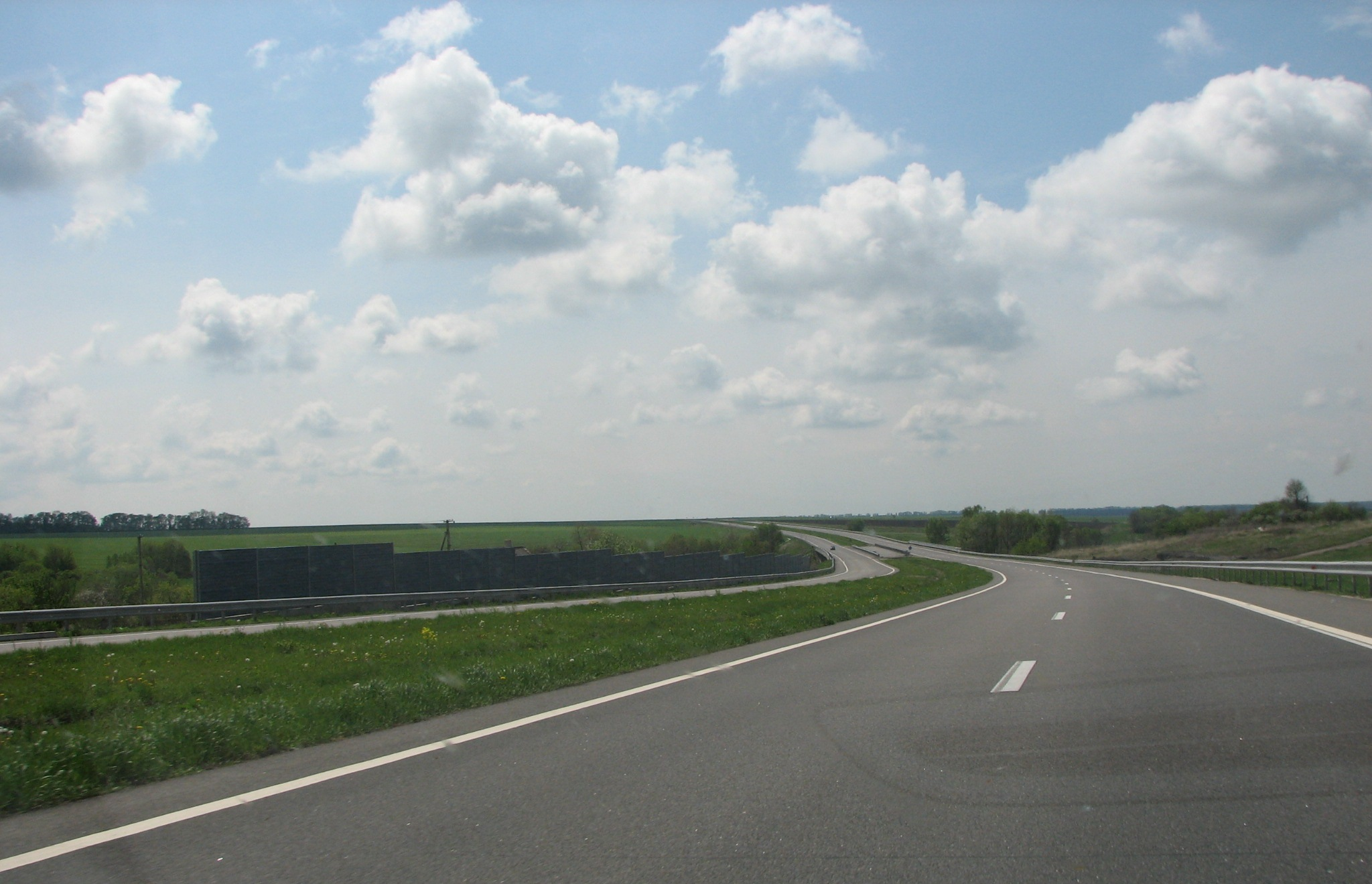
E105 in Ukraine (Kharkiv-Dnipro)

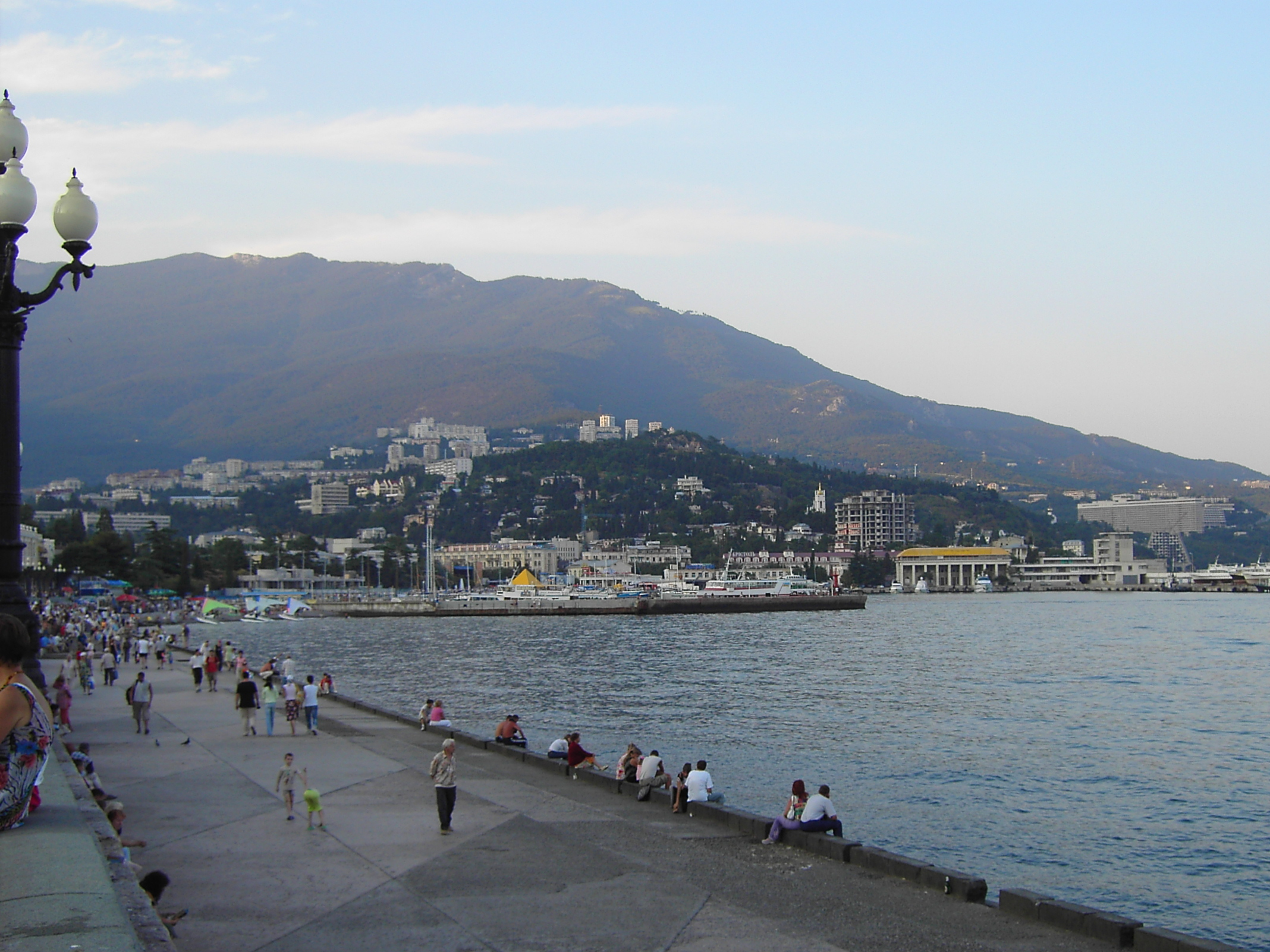
Yalta (Crimea)
