= Paavali Halonen =

Paavali Halonen was a farmer and settler in Finnish Lapland and a fabled warlord during the Russo-Swedish War (1590–1595).

The king of Sweden Gustav I promoted Finnish settlement beyond the Russian border of the realm by promising taxation reliefs to the settlers. This was in order for the king to be able to have claims for the region. The Russian border was by then defined by the Treaty of Nöteborg. This pursuit caused tensions with Russia, and during the Russo-Swedish War, Finnish settlements in northern Ostrobothnia were often destroyed by East Karelian guerrillas. The life of Paavali Halonen belongs to this time. He has been a historical person, although most of the knowledge about him is only folklore. "Halonen" is a Savonian surname and Paavali Halonen was the first permanent and Finnish settler inhabitant of Kemijärvi.

Local folklore has preserved stories about Paavali Halonen as one of the guerrilla chiefs, the most famous of them being Pekka Vesainen. Halonen was born in Muhos and led a vengeance raid to Kola and Kandalaksha and took part in attempt to capture fort of Kola with other Finnish chiefs, Vilmi and Kauppi from Kemi. East Karelians (Russians) offered peace and invited Finnish chiefs to the town for drinking. They were captured by Russians, but Paavali Halonen was suspicious and refused the offer. Thus he saved his life and returned home. According to the stories he first discovered Kemijärvi while escaping from Russia through the wilderness. Later he moved there with his family.

As the first settlers moved to Kemijärvi, the area was not inhabited by the Sami people anymore. The first tax record (maakirja) including Kemijärvi village is from 1631. Then the householder of the Halonen's farm was Paavo Paavonpoika (Paavo's son) Halonen, who probably was the son of the first inhabitant. His place of residence is known today as Halosenniemi. Large part of the population in North East Lapland today can trace their ancestry back to the sons of Paavali Halonen. By emigration his descendants have also spread to Northern Norway among Kvens, and to America.
