= Battle of Ivangorod =

- Part of the Russo-Swedish War (1590–1595)
Date	6 February [O.S. 30 January] 1590
Location	Near Ivangorod, Swedish Empire (now Russia)
Result	Russian victory

Belligerents
Russia	(yes) Sweden

Commanders and leaders
(Tsardom of Russia) Dmitri Khvorostin	(Swedish Empire) Gustav Baner

Strength
4,500	4,000 to 5,500 or 20,000

The Battle of Ivangorod (Russian: Ивангородское сражение; Swedish: Slaget vid Ivangorod) was one of the first battles of the Russo-Swedish War, where the Russians were able to defeat the main Swedish detachment and besiege Narva.

The size of the Swedish army ranges from 4,000 to 5,500 or 20,000, number of Russians no more 4,500
