= Pechenga (urban-type settlement), Murmansk Oblast =

Pechenga Печенга
- Urban-type settlement
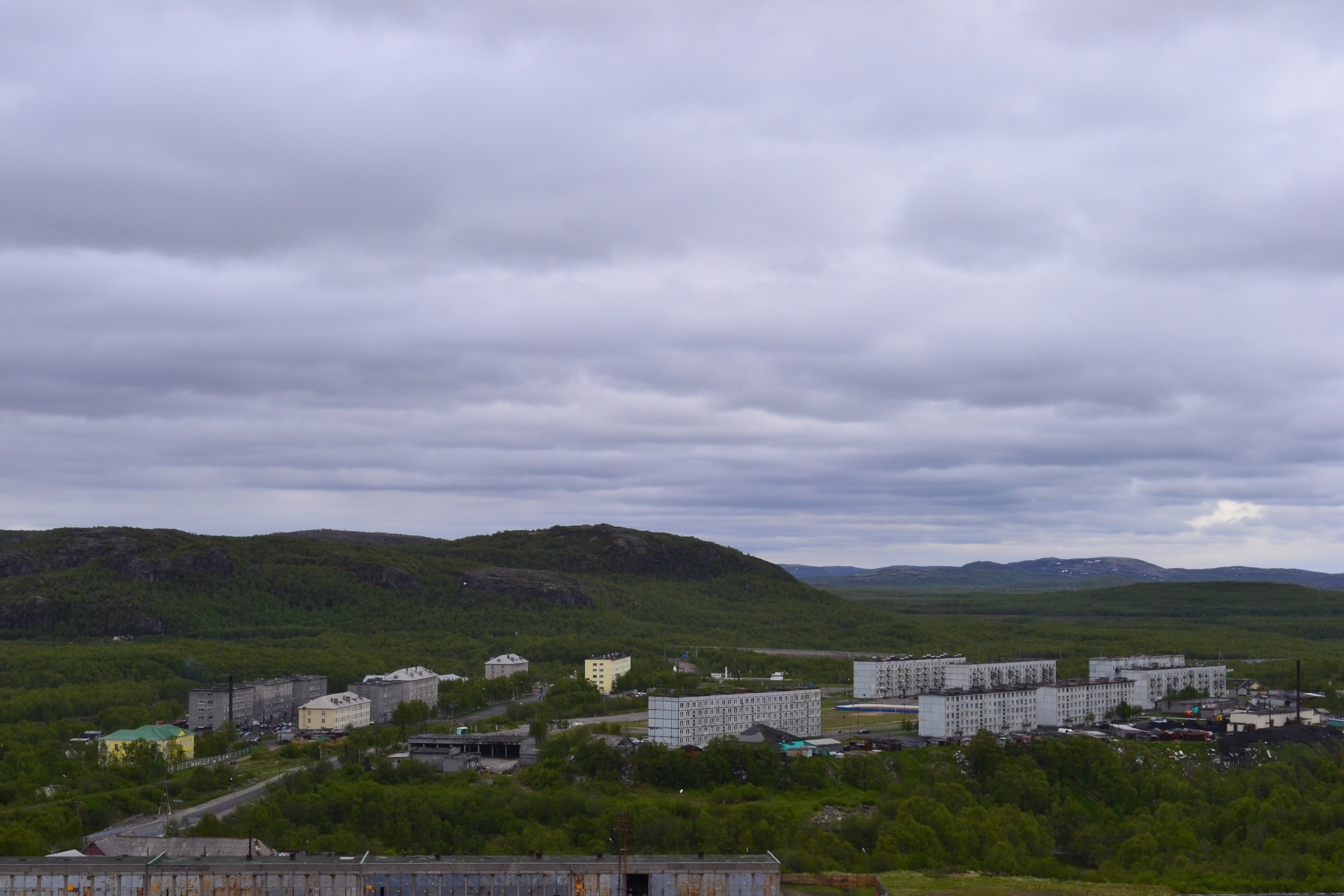

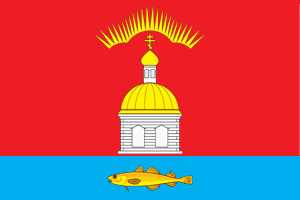
- Flag Coat of arms
- Interactive map of Pechenga
- Location of Pechenga Pechenga (Murmansk Oblast)
- Coordinates: 69°33′38″N 31°13′40″E
- Country: Russia
- Federal subject: Murmansk Oblast
- Administrative district: Pechengsky District
- Elevation: 5 m (16 ft)

Population (2010 Census)
  - Total: 3,188
  - Estimate (2023): 2,021 (−36.6%)

Administrative status
  - Capital of: Pechengsky District

Municipal status
  - Municipal district: Pechengsky Municipal District
  - Urban settlement: Pechenga Urban Settlement
- Time zone: UTC+3 (MSK)
- Postal code: 184410
- Dialing code: +7 81554
- OKTMO ID: 47615162051

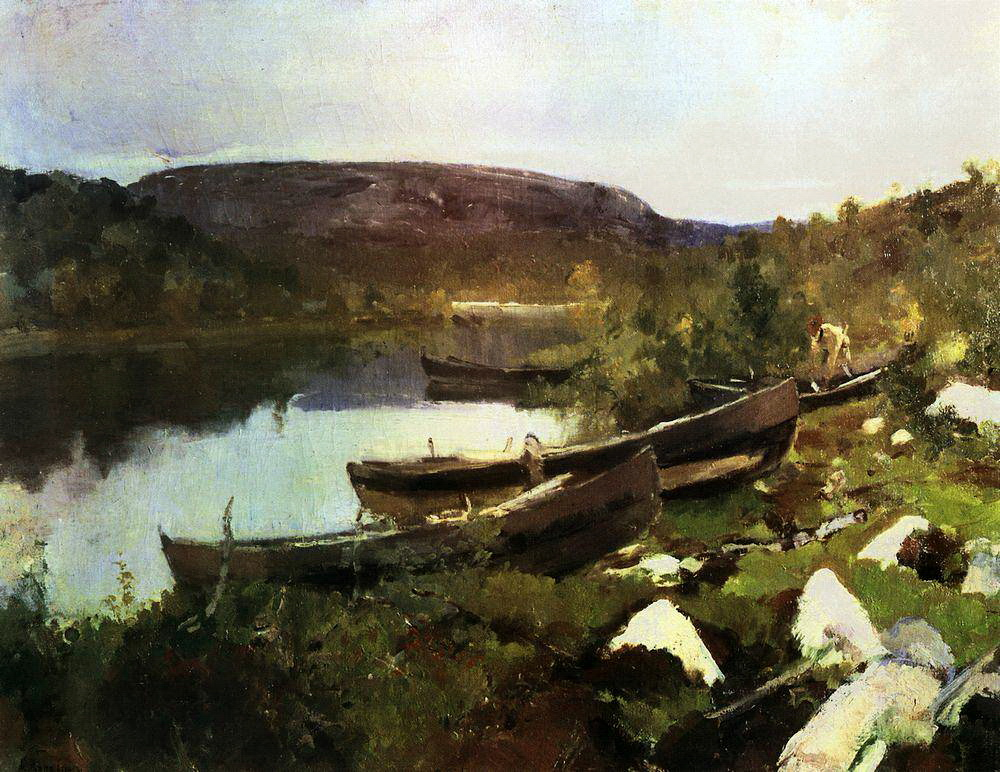
Fishing Boats at the Pechenga by Konstantin Korovin

Pechenga (Russian: Пече́нга, Russian pronunciation: [pʲɪˈt͡ɕenɡə]; Finnish and Swedish: Petsamo; Norwegian: Petsjenga; Northern Sami: Beahcán; Skolt Sami: Peäccam) is an urban locality (an urban-type settlement) in Pechengsky District, Murmansk Oblast, Russia. Municipally, it is incorporated as Pechenga Urban Settlement of Pechengsky Municipal District. Population: 3,188 (2010 census); 2,959 (2002 census); 2,671 (1989 Soviet census).

== History ==
The Pechenga area has been indigenously inhabited by the Sami.

The settlement was founded by Russians as the Pechenga Monastery in 1533 at the influx of the Pechenga River into the Barents Sea, 135 km west of modern Murmansk. St. Tryphon of Pechenga, a monk from Novgorod is considered to be the founder of Pechenga Monastery. In 1533, the area became part of Russia.

Inspired by the model of the Solovki, Tryphon wished to convert the local Sami population to Christianity and to demonstrate how faith could flourish in the most inhospitable lands. His example was eagerly followed by other Russian monks. By 1572, the Pechenga Monastery counted about 50 brethren and 200 lay followers. Six years after Tryphon's death in 1583, the wooden monastery was raided and burnt down by the Swedes. It is said that the raid claimed the lives of 51 monks and 65 lay brothers. The monastery was moved closer to the Norwegian border. It was destroyed in 1764, but restored in 1880, and exists to this day.

During the state of war between Finland and Soviet Russia (1918–1920) the area around Pechenga was disputed by British, Bolshevik and Finnish forces, and as a result of the Treaty of Tartu in 1920 became a part of Finland as Petsamo. Nickel was discovered in 1921 and began to be exploited commercially in 1935. The area was captured by the Soviets during the Winter War in 1940 but returned to Finland at the conclusion of the war. During the Second World War, between 1941 through 1944, Petsamo was used as a staging post for attacks on Murmansk by Finland and Germany. Aircraft from the British aircraft carrier HMS Furious attacked the port on 30 July 1941. The area was captured by the Red Army during the Petsamo–Kirkenes Offensive in 1944 and in 1947, after the subsequent Paris Peace Treaty, incorporated into the Soviet Union.

After the war the area was a military zone due to its proximity to the Norwegian border. Nickel mining has led to ecological problems in the area.

The 71st Guards Motor Rifle Division of the Russian Armed Forces is stationed at the settlement.
