= Pechenga Bay =

Bay of the Barents Sea, Russia

Coordinates: 69°36′50″N 31°21′59″E

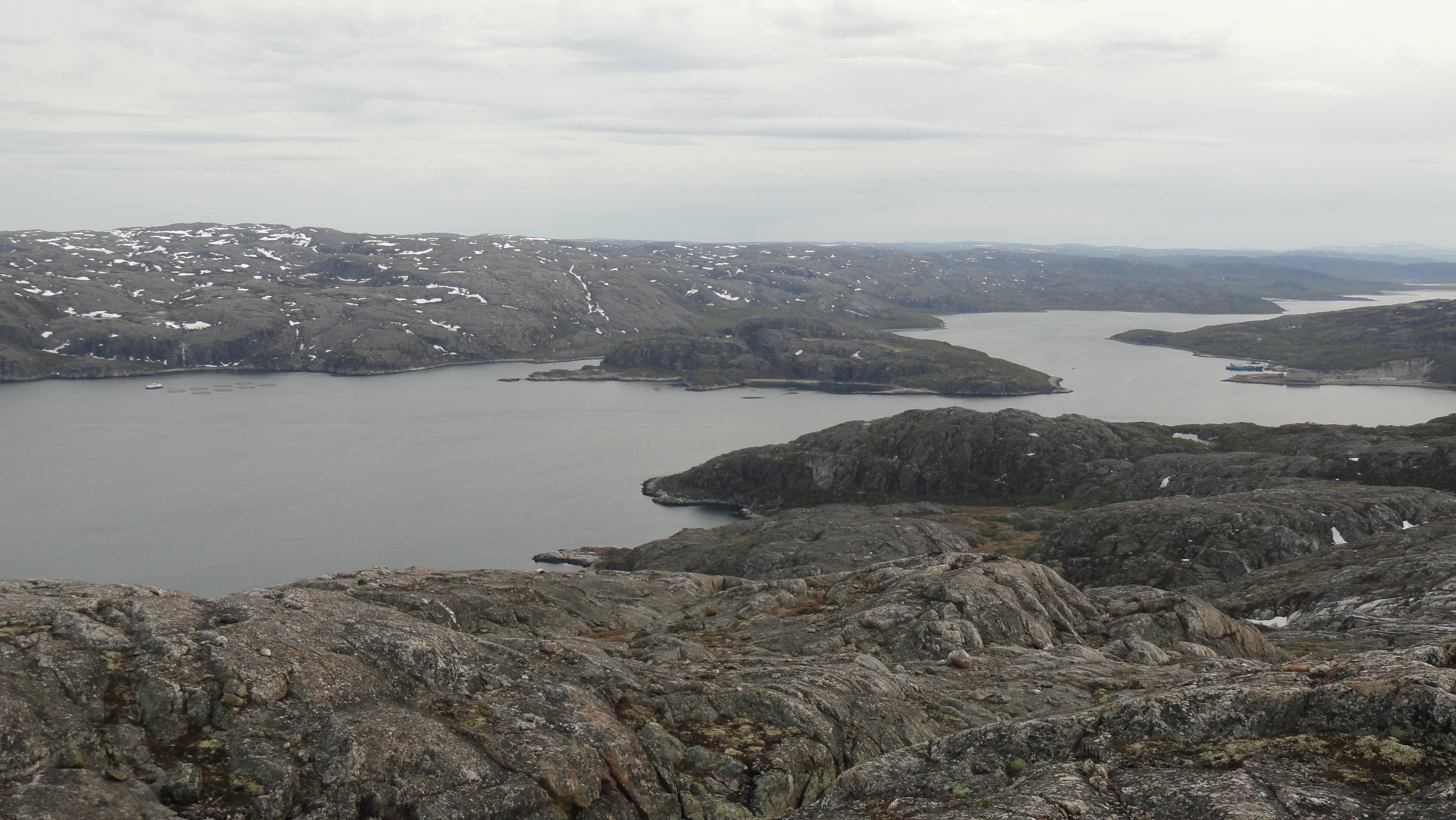
A view from Liinakhamari towards Pechenga

Pechenga Bay (Russian: Печенгская губа, Finnish: Petsamonvuono; also Petsamo Fjord and Pechenga Fjord) is a fjord-like bay of the Barents Sea on the Kola Peninsula in the Murmansk Oblast, Russia, about 25 km east from the border with Norway. It has rocky shores and stretches inland for 17 km. The Pechenga River discharges into the bay. The settlements of Pechenga and Liinakhamari are located on the shores of the bay.

The area was part of Finland from 1920 until 1944.

The shores if the bay are surrounded by fells, such as Parkkinotunturi (Russian: Парккинотунтури) and Trifonavaara ("Triphon's Fell", after Saint Tryphon of Pechenga), both on the western side of the bay.

The Pechenga Monastery, formerly known as the Tryphon-Pechenga Monastery is by Pechenga near the bay.

A depopulated village of Trifonovo is on the western side.

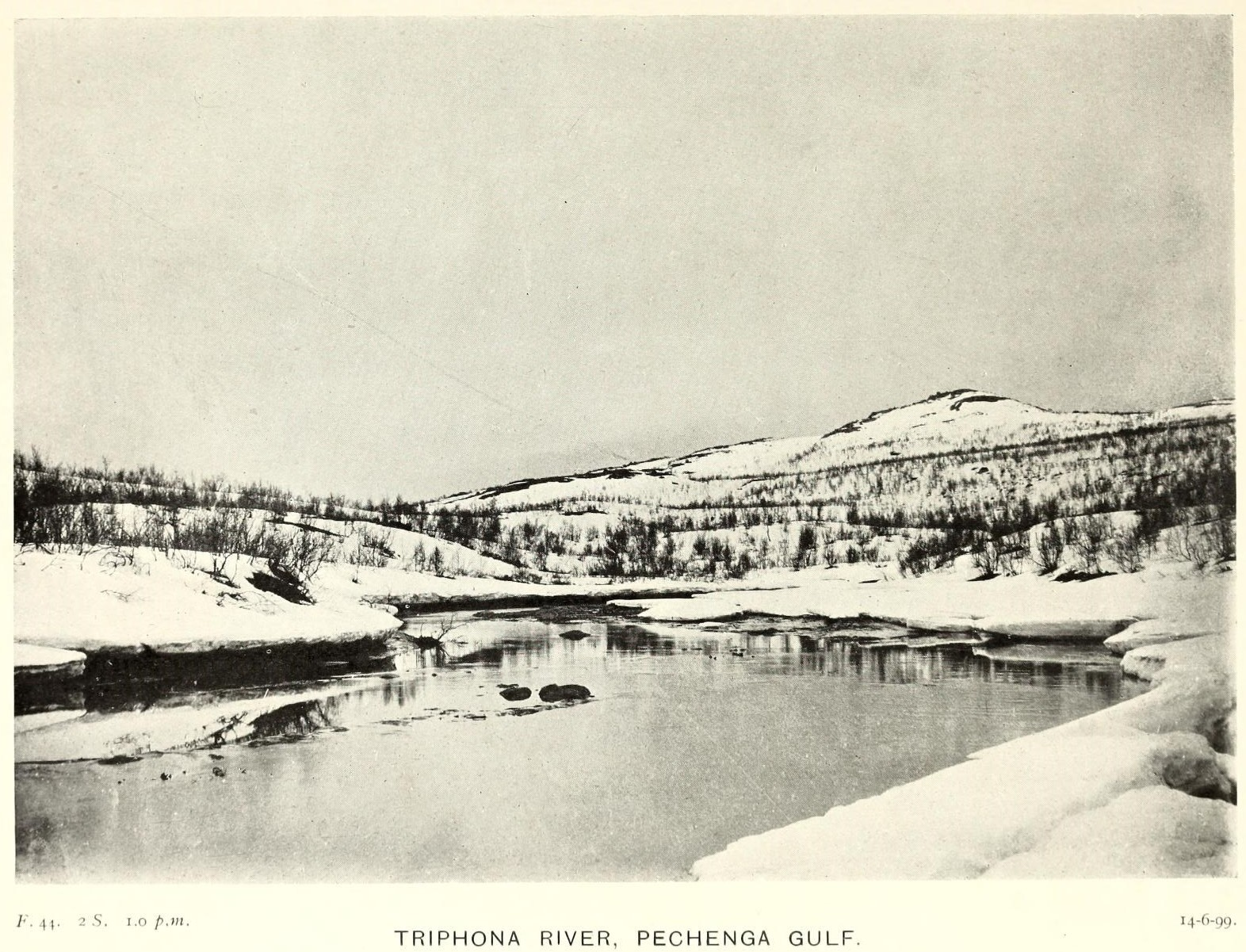
Triphona Stream, 1909

A 1909 Russian book by counter admiral Aleksandr Sidensner gives the following description:

It goes into the mainland by four bends, with total length of 8 miles. The first stretch is of length 4 miles and width 1 mile. It is open to northern winds and sea waves, and due to the depth of 80 sazhen and steep shores it is unsuitable for anchorage. The subsequent sharp bend makes the second stretch protected from sea waves, and in this place, called "Девкина заводь" (Devkina zavod, Maid's Backwater) there is a reasonably good anchorage. After the next bend southwards the width becomes 0.5 miles and the depth no more than 40 sazhen, with the best place for an anchorage being near the Triphon's Stream, where the depths are between 5 and 25 sazhen. At the entrance into the bay the shores are steep underwater, high, and barren, but approaching the mouth of Pechenga they lower down, the slopes ease and become covered with thick vegetation. The shore by Triphon's Stream is low and flat, with considerable area for coastal buildings. Further, for about 2 versts the bay joins the mouth of Pechenga, which shows the bottom during the low tide.

== See also ==
- List of fjords of Russia
