= Bogdan Belsky =

Russian politician (died 1611)

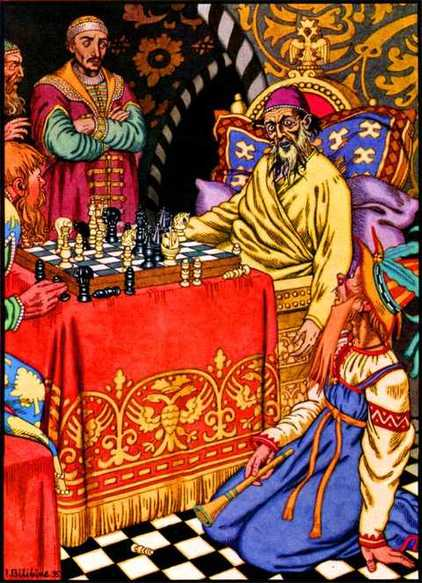
Tsar Ivan the Terrible reportedly died while playing chess with Bogdan Belsky.

Bogdan Yakovlevich Belsky (Russian: Богдан Яковлевич Бельский; died 1611) was a Russian statesman, oprichnik, and a close associate of Ivan the Terrible.

== Biography ==
=== Early life and career ===
Bogdan was not related to the great Gediminid princely Belsky family. It is believed that he became welcome at the royal court owing to his kinship with Malyuta Skuratov. His name was first mentioned in 1571, when Belsky was the tsar's bodyguard (rynda) during his military campaigns. He would soon become the tsar's closest associate and would even sleep in his chamber.

Ivan never promoted Belsky to any significant post or changed his official status, not even after Belsky had forced one of the most important fortresses – Wolmar – to surrender in 1577 during the Livonian War. For this, he was only repaid with a Portuguese gold coin and a golden chain. In 1578, Bodgan Belsky was appointed oruzhnichiy (оружничий, or keeper of the tsar's weapons) and wouldn't make his way up any further. In reality, Belsky was Ivan's vremenshchik (временщик), or minion. The tsar entrusted him with his intimate affairs, such as inquiries about his potential fiancée Mary Hastings (1581), and negotiations with Jerome Bowes, the English ambassador, about the tsar's possible marriage with this lady (1583–1584).

Belsky was also in charge of the fortunetellers, who had been gathered from all over Russia after the appearance of a comet and who had foretold the tsar's death. Ivan died in Belsky's arms of a stroke when they sat down to play chess. There are indications that Ivan entrusted Belsky with his younger son Dmitry Ivanovich.

=== Reign of Boris Godunov ===
After the death of Ivan, a number of boyar parties emerged. Bogdan Belsky sided with the Nagoys (relatives of Maria Nagaya, the tsarina). Boris Godunov was the only influential boyar to offer protection to Belsky. After the exile of Dmitry Ivanovich and the Nagoys to Uglich, the frontrunning boyars joined their efforts in their struggle against Bogdan Belsky, inciting the citizens of Moscow. He was blamed for the death of Ivan and accused of plotting to murder Feodor I in order to transfer power to Boris Godunov or even seize it himself. On hearing the news of Belsky's removal to Nizhny Novgorod (1584), the Muscovites calmed down. They didn't know, however, that he had been sent there as a voivode.

In 1591, Bogdan Belsky was among those who fought with the Crimean Khanate. In 1592, he took part in the Finnish Campaign. In 1593, Belsky was among those sent to negotiate peace with the Crimean khan. Upon Feodor I's death in 1598, Bogdan Belsky returned to Moscow and nominated himself for the throne. He failed, however, and soon began his anti-Godunov campaign seemingly in favor of Simeon Bekbulatovich. Tsar Boris Godunov appointed Belsky okolnichy and hastily sent him away from Moscow, ordering him to build the town of Tsaryov-Borisov on the shores of the Donets River (1599–1600). Belsky's continuing defiance in the outlying region of Russia put the tsar against him; Belsky tried to win the favor of the service class people and is known to have said once that Boris was the tsar in Moscow, and he was the tsar in Borisov. In 1601, Belsky was deassigned from Borisov, subjected to corporal punishment (they say that Godunov ordered his beard plucked), stripped of his property, and sent to prison in the provinces.

=== Time of Troubles ===
Godunov's death in 1605 contributed to Belsky's return to Moscow. Kissing the icon on the day of False Dmitry I’s arrival in Moscow, he tried to convince the Muscovites of the latter’s royal origins. Later on, False Dmitry I would bestow the rank of boyar upon him. When Vasili IV came to power, he sent Belsky away from Moscow to Kazan as a voivode. It is still unknown whether Bogdan Belsky pledged allegiance to Wladislaus IV or not, but his name was not on list of those who had been asking for mercy from the Polish king Sigismund III Vasa and his son. When in 1611 the citizens of Kazan decided to swear allegiance to False Dmitry II (also known as Thief of Tushino), Belsky tried to talk them out of it and refused to submit to the impostor. For this, he was killed by a mob in 1611.

== Bibliography ==
- "Бельский, Богдан Яковлевич" . Brockhaus and Efron Encyclopedic Dictionary (in Russian). 1906.
