= Oleksandr Harbuz =

Hero of Ukraine (2002–2022)

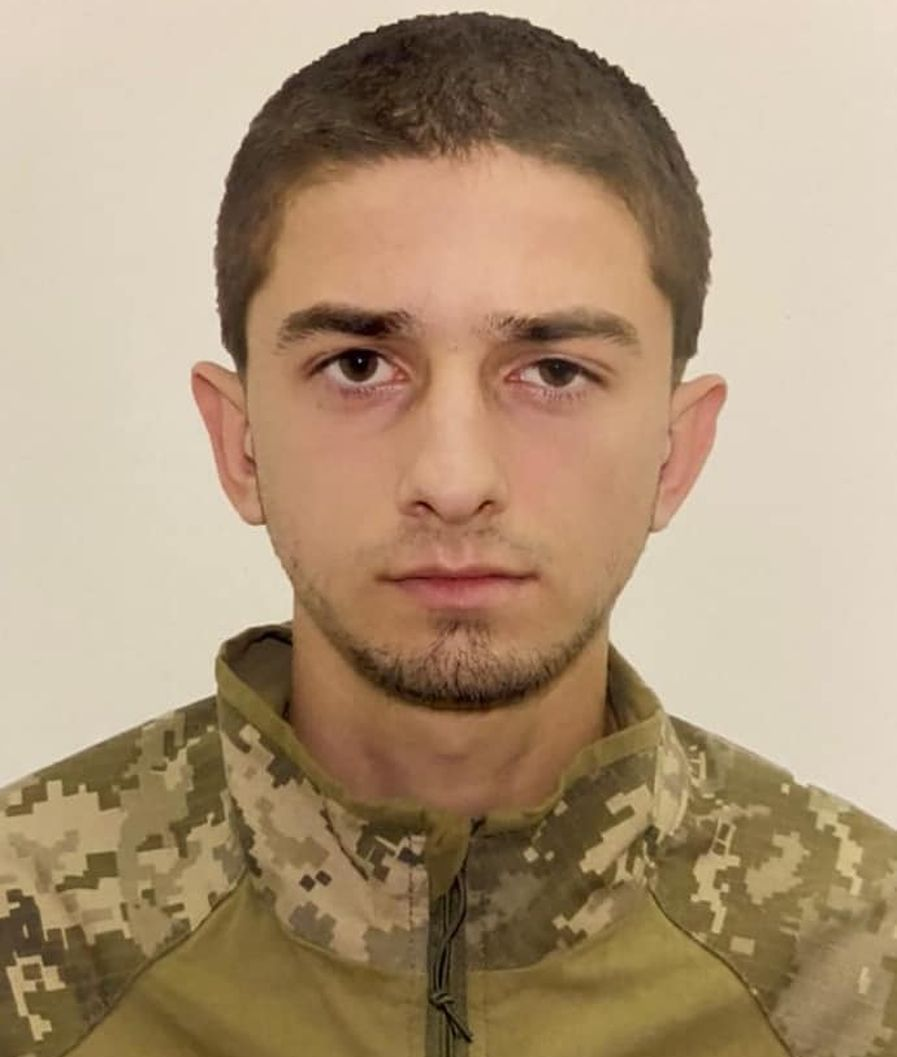
Oleksandr Harbuz

Oleksandr Ruslanovych Harbuz (Ukrainian: Олександр Русланович Гарбуз, 2 July 2002 – March 2022) was a soldier of the Armed Forces of Ukraine, participant in the Russian-Ukrainian war, Hero of Ukraine, who has fallen during the Russian invasion of Ukraine.

== Biography ==
He was born on July 2, 2002, in the village Hubynykha, Samar Raion, Dnipropetrovsk Oblast. In 2020 he graduated from Pereschepynsky Lyceum with a degree in 'Farm Worker'.

On November 20, 2021, he signed a contract for military service and became a soldier of the 93rd separate mechanized brigade 'Cold Yar' (укр. Холодний Яр). He completed a training course at the training center, held the position of operator of the anti-tank missile complex of the anti-tank platoon of the mechanized battalion.

During the Russian invasion of Ukraine in 2022, he was the operator of the ATGM. With the help of the Corsair anti-tank missile system, Alexander destroyed a total of a dozen enemy combat vehicles.

On the night of 16 March 2022, in the Kharkiv Oblast, Oleksandr, was captured with another soldier. On March 24, after the liberation of the village of Husarivka in the Balakliia raion, the Ukrainian military discovered the body of Oleksandr Harbuz, who had been shot in the head, with signs of tortures.

== Awards ==
- The title of 'Hero of Ukraine' with the Order of the Gold Star (2022, posthumously)
