= Tryphon of Pechenga =

Russian monk and ascetic (1495–1583)

Saint Tryphon of Pechenga
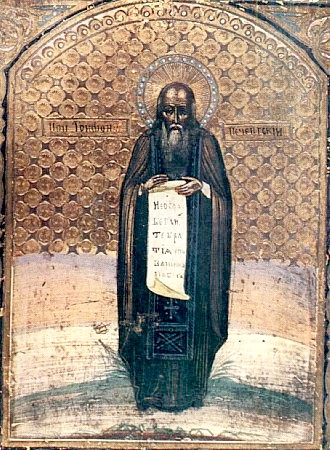

Enlightener of the Sami Abbot of Pechenga, Venerable
- Born: 1495; Torzhok, Russia
- Died: 1583 (aged 87–88); Pechenga
- Venerated in: Eastern Orthodox Church
- Feast: 15 December
- Patronage: Invoked by Russian mariners

Tryphon of Pechenga (Russian: Преподобный Трифон Печенгский, Кольский; Finnish: Pyhittäjä Trifon Petsamolainen (Kuolalainen); Skolt Sami: Pââʹss Treeffan; Norwegian Bokmål and Swedish: Sankt Trifon av Petsamo; 1495–1583) was a Russian monk and ascetic in the Eastern Orthodox Church on the Kola Peninsula and in Lapland in the 16th century. He is considered to be the founder of the Pechenga Monastery and "Enlightener of the Sami".

== Life and missionary work ==
Baptized with the name Mitrofan, he was the son of a priest from the Novgorod region. Trained as a military engineer, he felt that he was called by God to proclaim the Gospels to the Sámi. Though he was met with hostility from the pagans, he was effective in convincing many of them to convert to Christianity. His effectiveness is attributed to the fact that he took the time to study their beliefs and languages.

With permission from Archbishop Macarius of Novgorod to found a Church of the Annunciation up north, Mitrofan was tonsured a monk with the religious name Tryphon and ordained a hieromonk. After his ordination and tonsure, Tryphon became the leader of the Holy Trinity Monastery on the banks of the Pechenga River. He continued spreading the Gospel to the residents near the river.

== Veneration ==
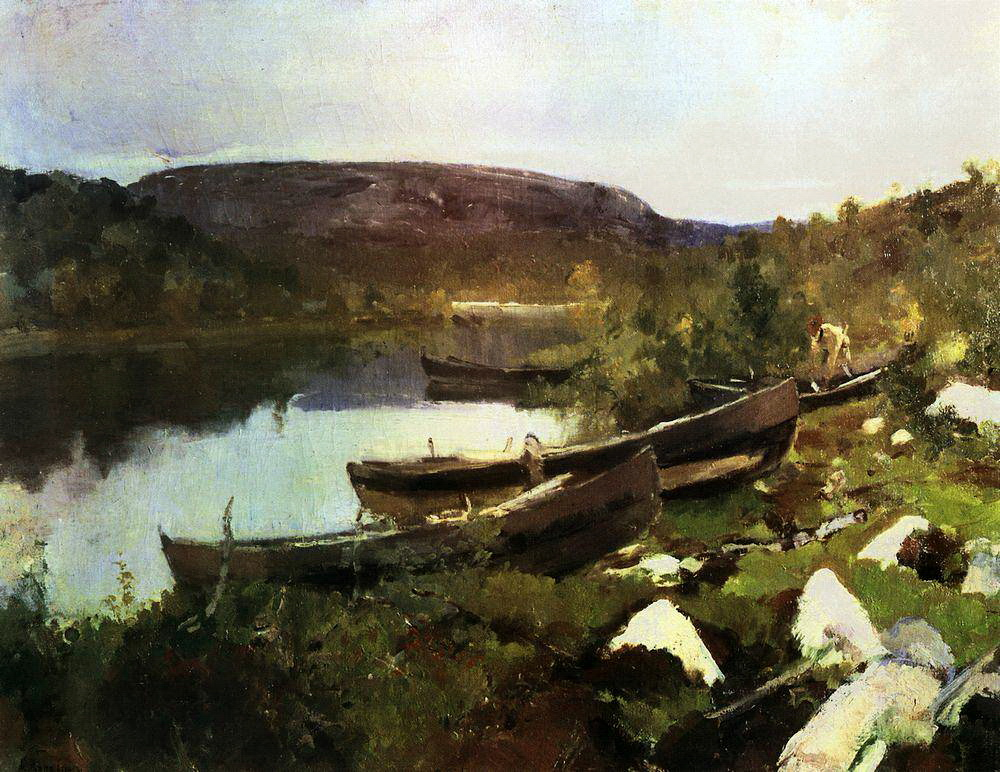
St. Triphon's Brook in Pechenga got its name from Tryphon (1894 painting by Konstantin Korovin).

Tryphon died in 1583 at the age of 88 and is commemorated on 15 December in the Eastern Orthodox Church. Russian seamen traditionally pray to Tryphon when they are in danger.

Tryphon is relatively unknown in the greater Orthodox traditions, but achieved and maintained popularity among Orthodox Christians in the Lapland Regions. His popularity is often attributed to his skillful blends of Orthodoxy and pagan practices.

== See also ==
- Skolts
