= Konstantin Korovin =

Russian impressionist painter (1861–1939)

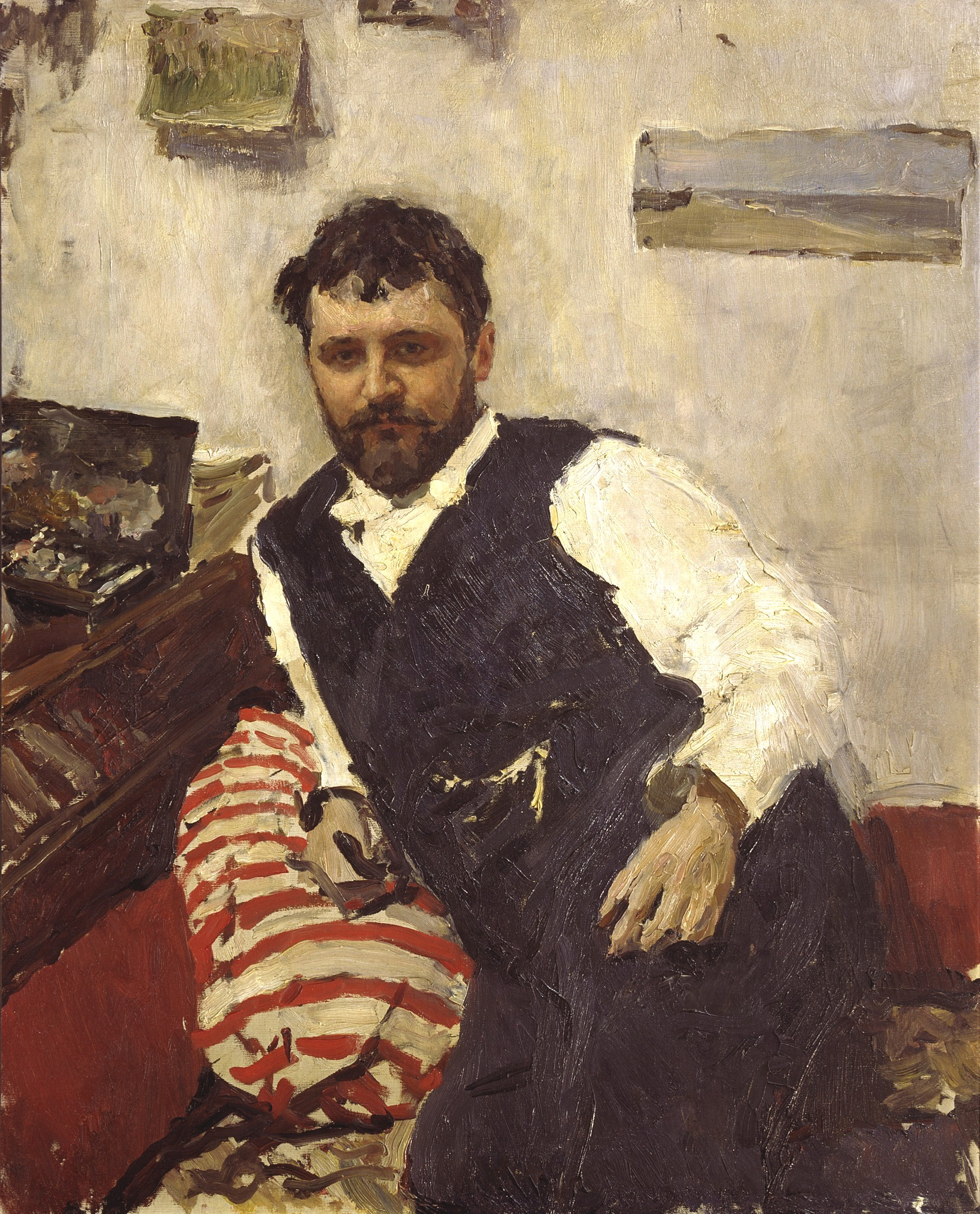
- 1891 portrait by Valentin Serov
- Born: 5 December [O.S. 23 November] 1861; Moscow, Russian Empire
- Died: 11 September 1939 (aged 77); Paris, France
- Education: Moscow School of Painting, Sculpture and Architecture
- Known for: Painting
- Notable work: Hammerfest: Aurora Borealis 1894–1895; Portrait of Feodor Chaliapin 1915
- Movement: Impressionism
- Awards: Legion of Honour (1900); Member Academy of Arts (1905)

Konstantin Alekseyevich Korovin (Russian: Константи́н Алексе́евич Коро́вин; 5 December [O.S. 23 November] 1861 – 11 September 1939) was a leading Russian Impressionist painter.

== Biography ==
=== Youth and education ===
Konstantin was born into a wealthy merchant family of Old Believers and his mother was from the nobility, although they were officially registered as "peasants" from Vladimir Gubernia". His father, Aleksey Mikhailovich Korovin, earned a university degree and was more interested in arts and music than in the family business established by Konstantin's grandfather. Konstantin's older brother Sergei Korovin was a notable realist painter. Konstantin's relative Illarion Pryanishnikov was also a prominent painter of the time and a teacher at the Moscow School of Painting, Sculpture and Architecture.

In 1875 Korovin entered the Moscow School of Painting, Sculpture and Architecture, where he studied with Vasily Perov and Alexei Savrasov. His brother Sergei was already a student at the school. During their student years, the Korovins became friends with fellow students Valentin Serov and Isaac Levitan; Konstantin maintained these friendships throughout his life.

In 1881–1882, Korovin spent a year at the Imperial Academy of Arts in St. Petersburg, but returned disappointed to the Moscow School of Painting, Sculpture and Architecture. He studied at the school under his new teacher Vasily Polenov until 1886.

In 1885 Korovin traveled to Paris and Spain. "Paris was a shock for me … Impressionists… in them I found everything I was scolded for back home in Moscow", he later wrote.

=== Early works ===
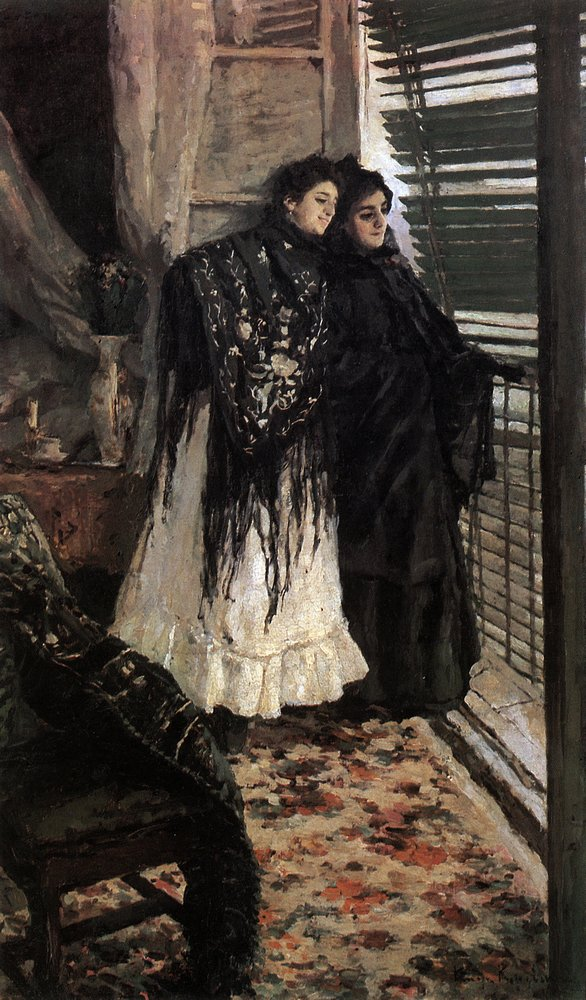
Korovin. On the Balcony, Spanish Women Leonora and Amparo, 1897–1898

Polenov introduced Korovin to Savva Mamontov's Abramtsevo Circle: Viktor Vasnetsov, Apollinary Vasnetsov, Ilya Repin, Mark Antokolsky and others. The group's love for stylized Russian themes is reflected in Korovin's picture A Northern Idyll. In 1885 Korovin worked for Mamontov's opera house, designing the stage decor for Giuseppe Verdi's Aida, Léo Delibes' Lakmé and Georges Bizet's Carmen.

In 1888 Korovin traveled with Mamontov to Italy and Spain, where he produced the painting On the Balcony, Spanish Women Leonora and Ampara. Konstantin traveled within Russia, the Caucasus and Central Asia and exhibited with the Peredvizhniki. He painted in the Impressionist, and later in the Art Nouveau, styles.

In the 1890s Korovin became a member of the Mir iskusstva art group.

Korovin's subsequent works were strongly influenced by his travels to the north. In 1888 he was captivated by the stern northern landscapes seen in The Coast of Norway and the Northern Sea.

His second trip to the north, with Valentin Serov in 1894, coincided with the construction of the Northern Railway. Korovin painted a large number of landscapes: Norwegian Port, St. Triphon's Brook in Pechenga, Hammerfest: Aurora Borealis, The Coast at Murmansk and others. The paintings are built on a delicate web of shades of grey. The etude style of these works was typical for Korovin's art of the 1890s.

Using material from his trip, Korovin designed the Far North pavilion at the 1896 All Russia Exhibition in Nizhny Novgorod. He painted ten big canvasses for the pavilion as well, depicting various aspects of life in the northern and Arctic regions. After the closure of the Exhibition, the canvasses were eventually placed in the Yaroslavsky Rail Terminal in Moscow. In the 1960s, they were restored and transferred to the Tretyakov Gallery.

In 1900 Korovin designed the Central Asia section of the Russian Empire pavilion at the Paris World Fair and was awarded the Legion of Honour by the French government.

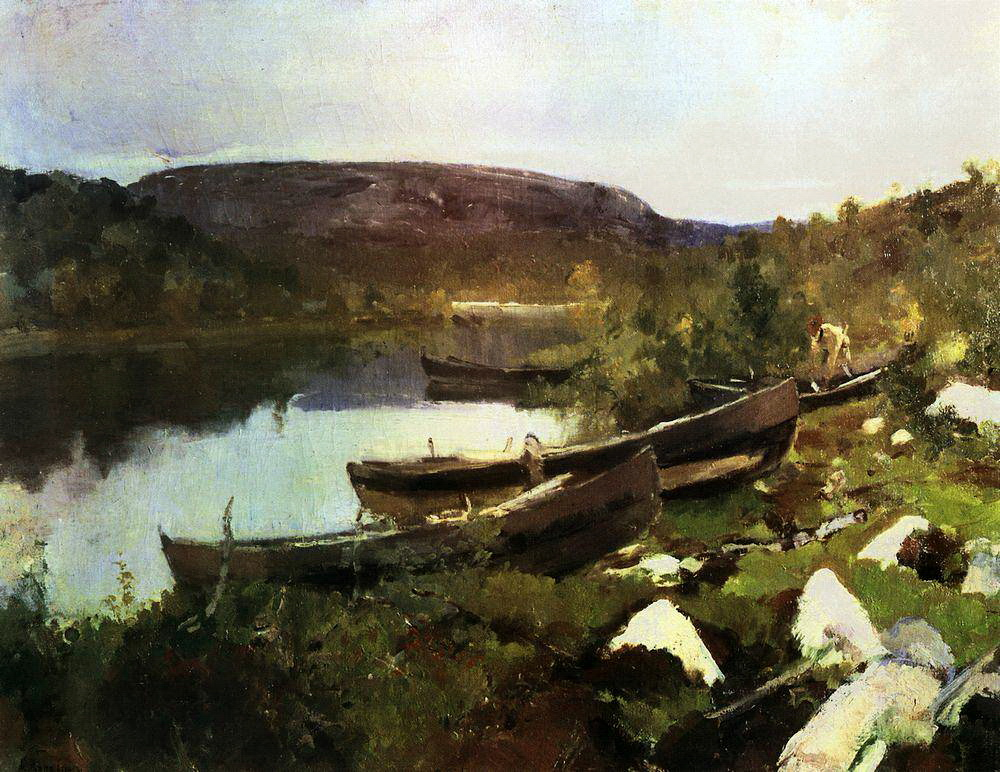
St. Triphon's Brook in Pechenga, 1894

In the beginning of the 20th century, Korovin focused his attention on the theater. He moved from Mamontov's opera to the Mariinsky Theatre in St. Petersburg. Departing from traditional stage decor, which only indicated the place of action, Korovin produced a mood decor conveying the general emotions of the performance. Korovin designed sets for Konstantin Stanislavsky's dramatic productions, as well as Mariinsky's operas and ballets. He did the stage design for such Mariinsky productions as Faust (1899), The Little Humpbacked Horse (1901), and Sadko (1906) that became famous for their expressiveness.

In 1905 Korovin became an Academician of Painting and in 1909–1913 a professor at the Moscow School of Painting, Sculpture and Architecture.

One of the artist's favourite themes was Paris. He painted A Paris Cafe (1890s), Cafe de la Paix (1905), La Place de la Bastille (1906), Paris at Night, Le Boulevard Italien (1908), Night Carnival (1901), Paris in the Evening (1907), and others.

During World War I Korovin worked as a camouflage consultant at the headquarters of one of the Russian armies and was often seen on the front lines. After the October Revolution Korovin continued to work in the theater, designing stages for Richard Wagner's Die Walküre and Siegfried, as well as Pyotr Ilyich Tchaikovsky's The Nutcracker (1918–1920).

In 1923 Korovin moved to Paris on the advice of Commissar of Education Anatoly Lunacharsky to cure his heart condition and help his handicapped son. There was supposed to be a large exhibition of Korovin's works, but the works were stolen and Korovin was left penniless. For years, he produced the numerous Russian Winters and Paris Boulevards just to make ends meet.

In the last years of his life he produced stage designs for many of the major theatres of Europe, America, Asia and Australia, the most famous of which is his scenery for the Turin Opera House's production of Nikolai Rimsky-Korsakov's The Golden Cockerel.

Korovin died in Paris on 11 September 1939. He was buried in Sainte-Geneviève-des-Bois Russian Cemetery, in the southern suburbs of Paris.

Konstantin's son Alexey Korovin (1897–1950) was a notable Russian-French painter. Because of an accident during his childhood he had both feet amputated. Alexey committed suicide in 1950.

== Works ==
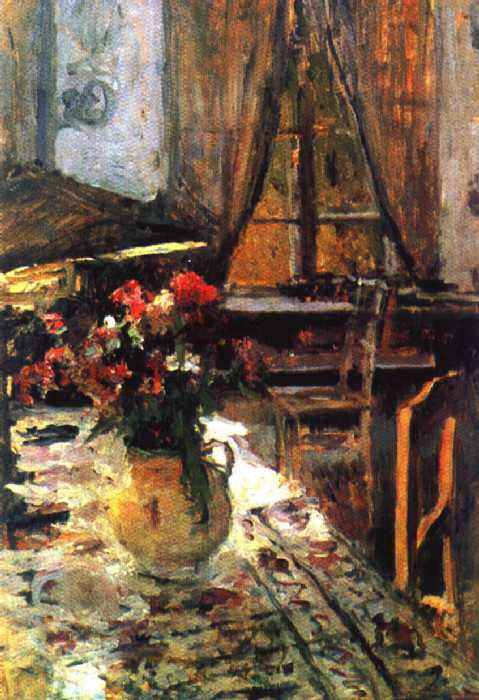
Twilight in a Room. 1880s

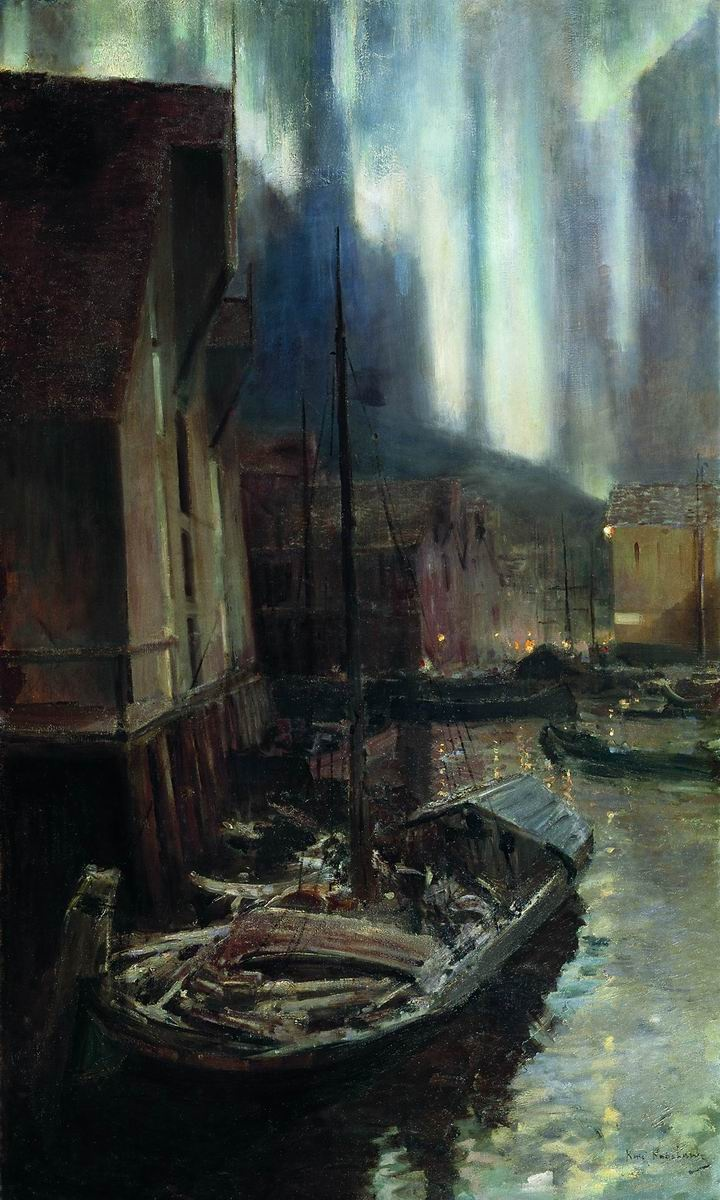
Hammerfest: Aurora Borealis. 1894–1895

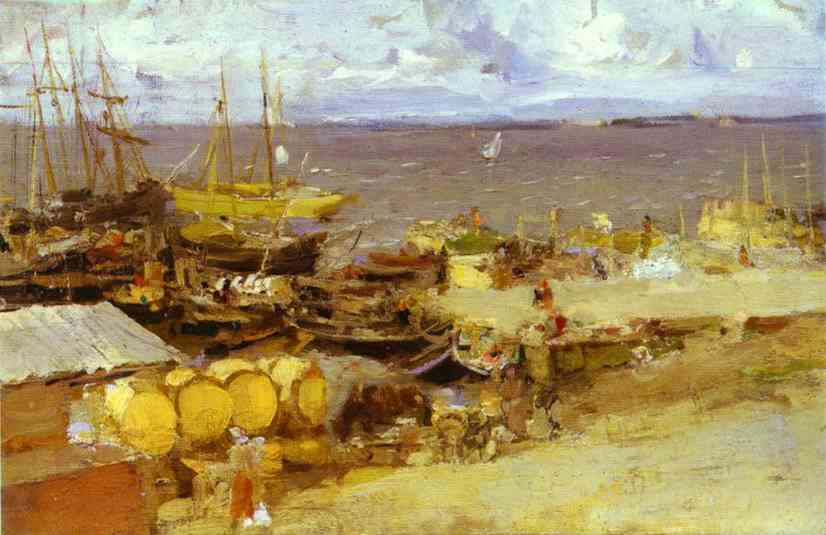
Arkhangelsk Port on the Dvina. 1894

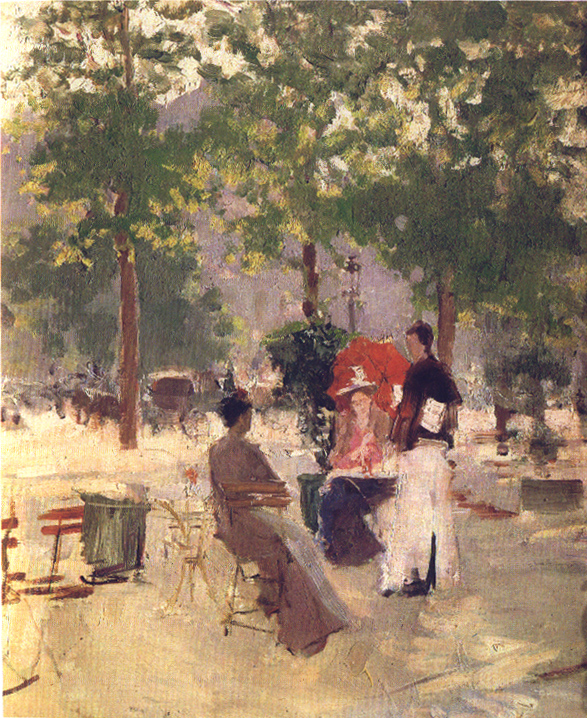
Parisian Cafe. Late 1890s

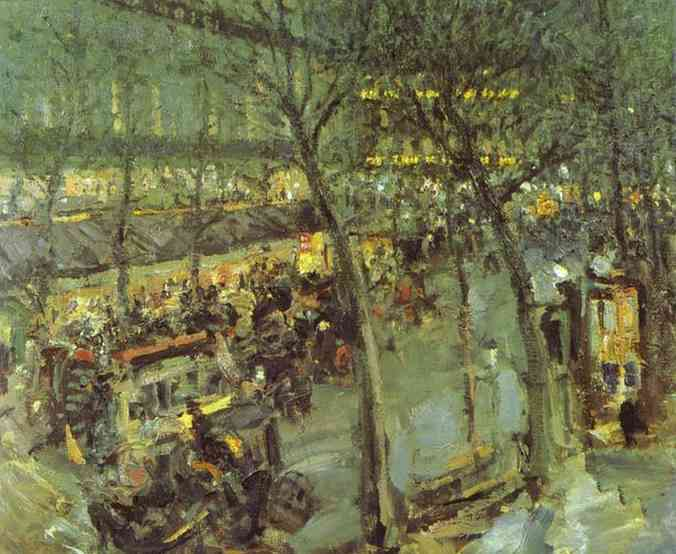
Paris. Café de la Paix. 1906

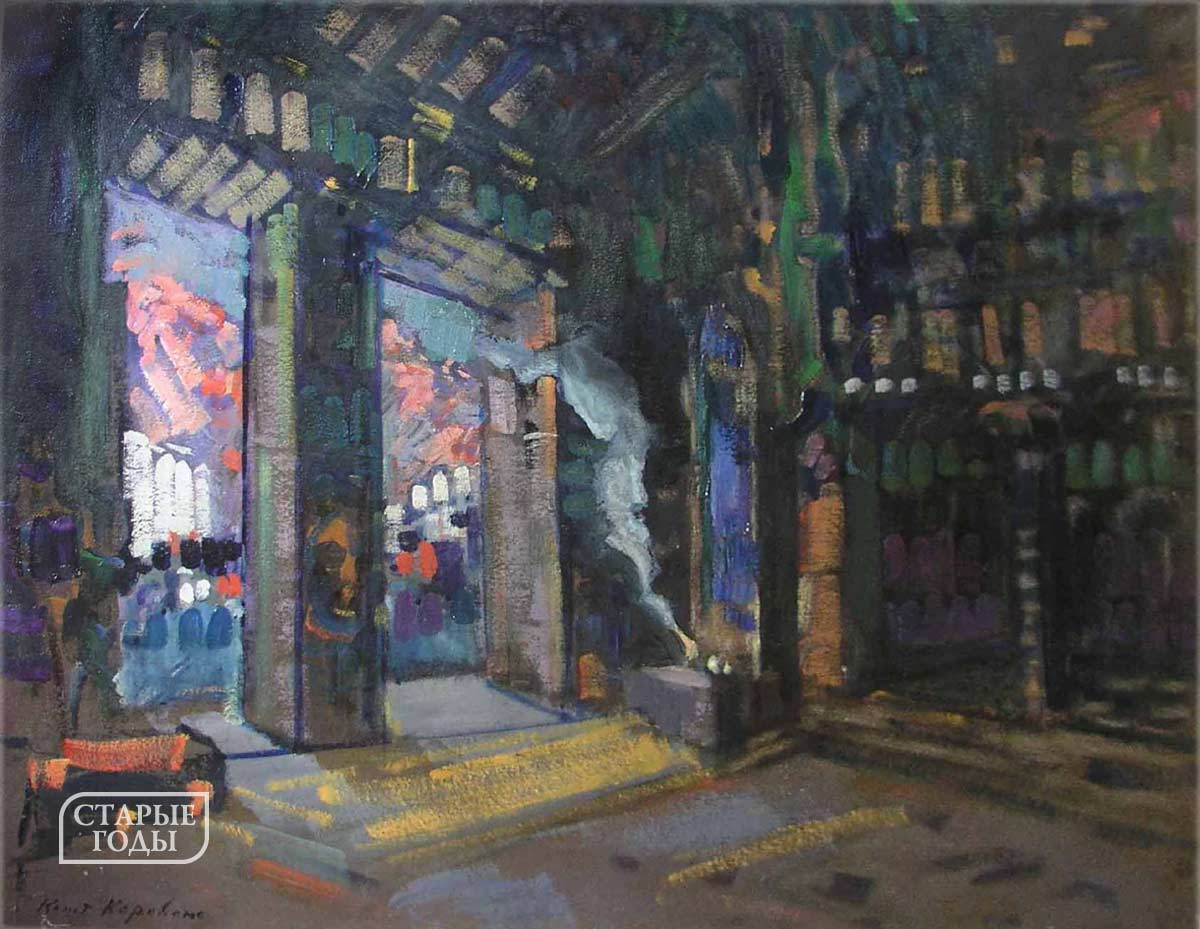
Theatrical Composition. 1910s

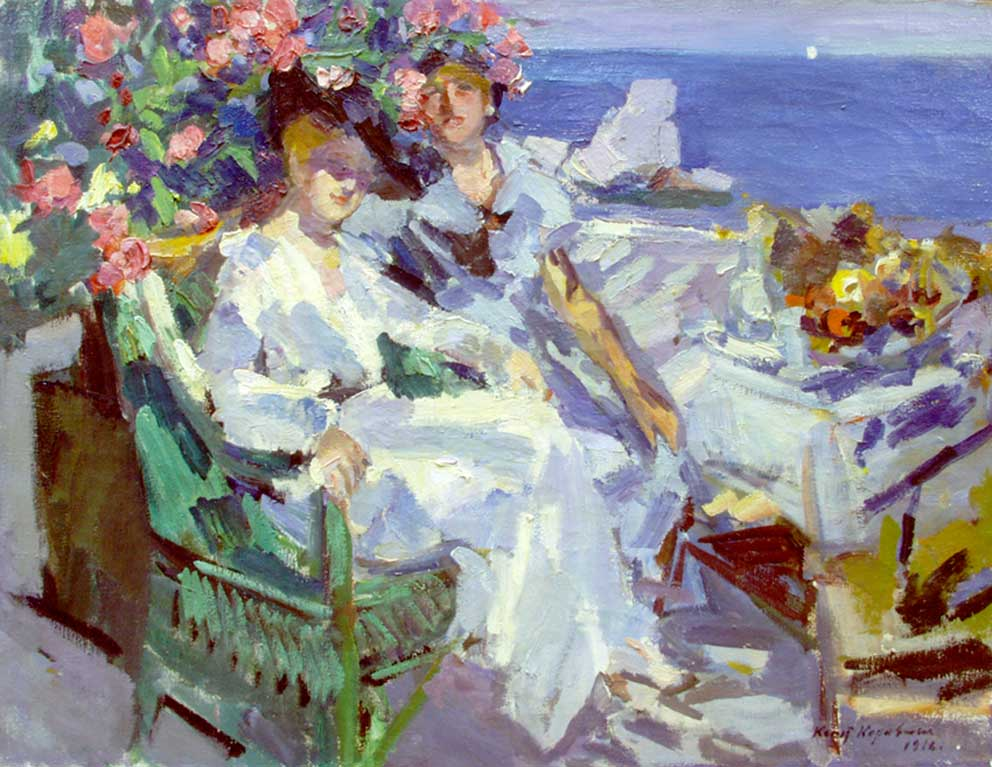
Two Ladies on a Terrace. 1911

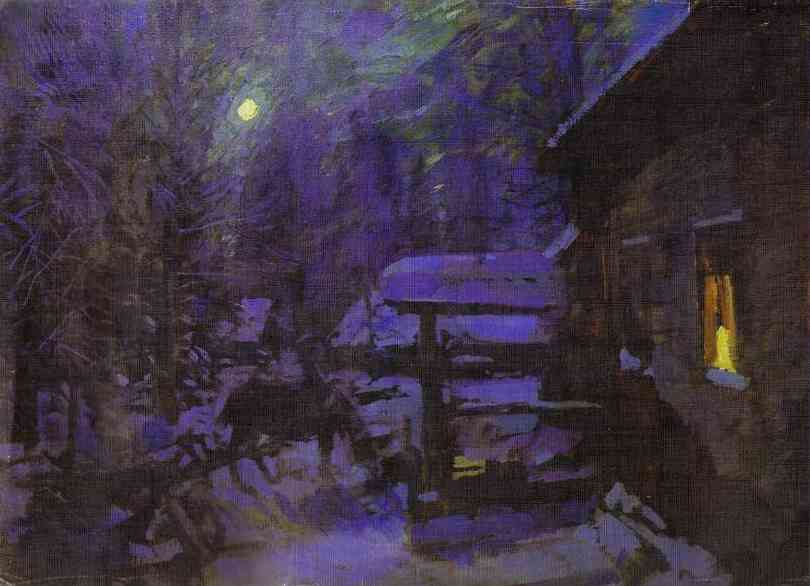
Moonlit Night, Winter. 1913

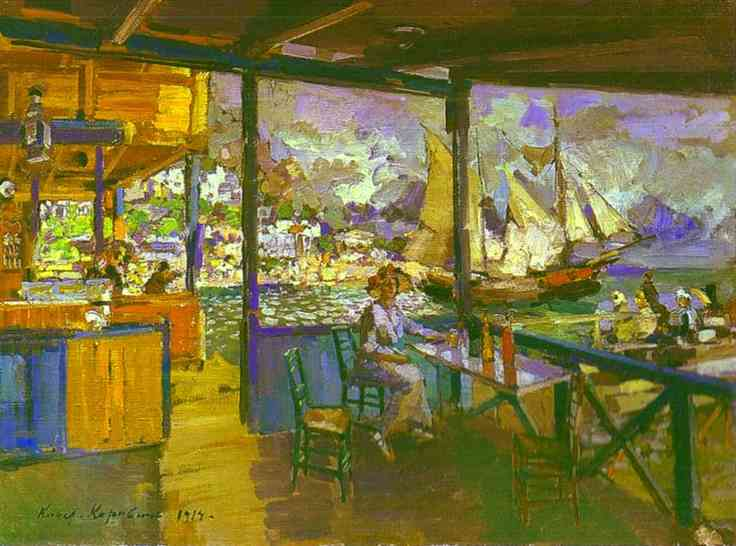
Pier in Gurzuf. 1914

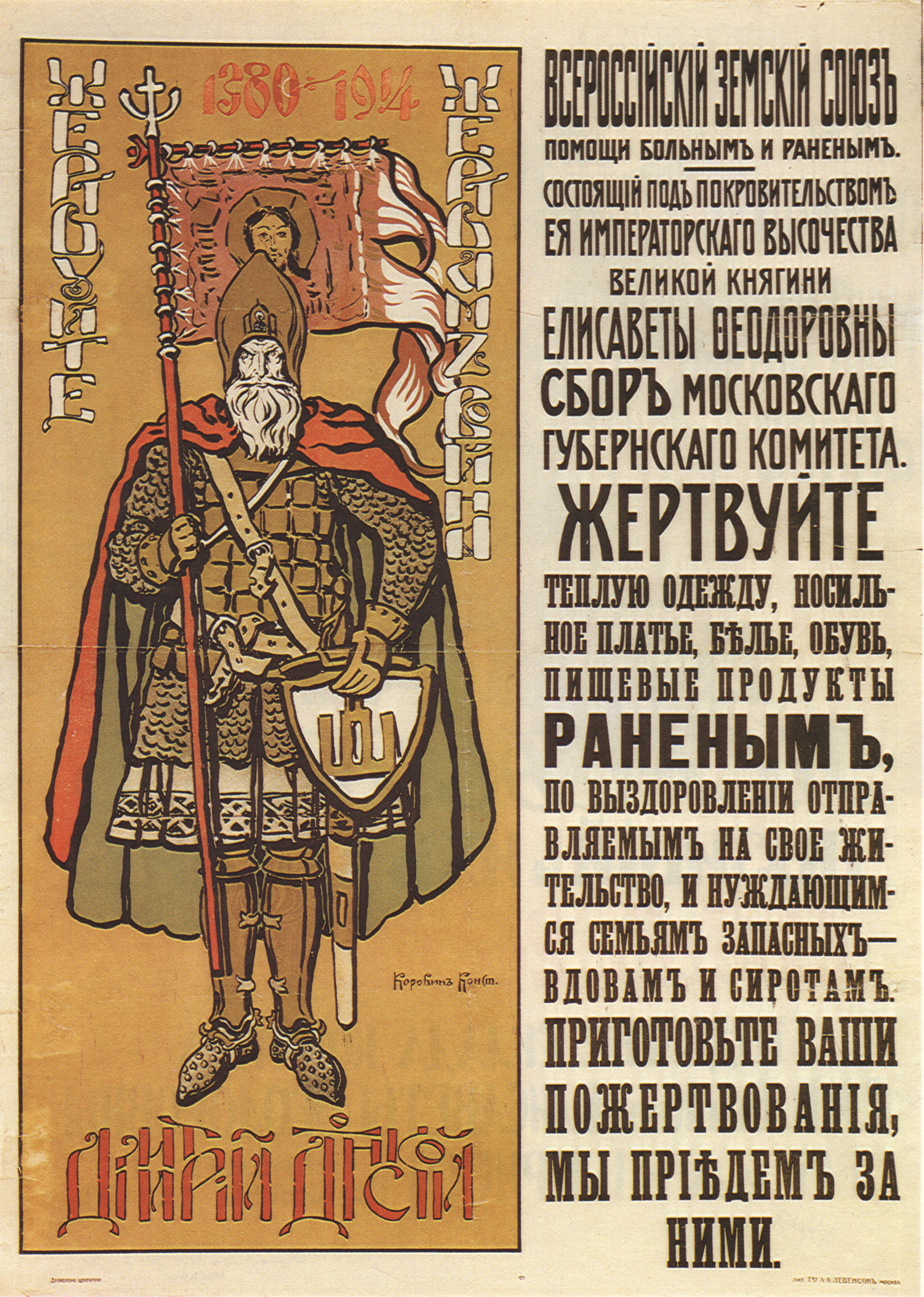
Dmitry Donskoy, WWI poster. 1914

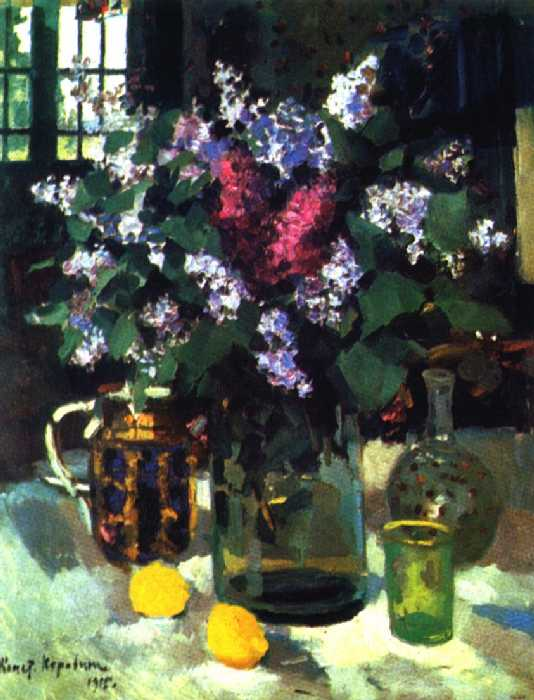
Lilac. 1915

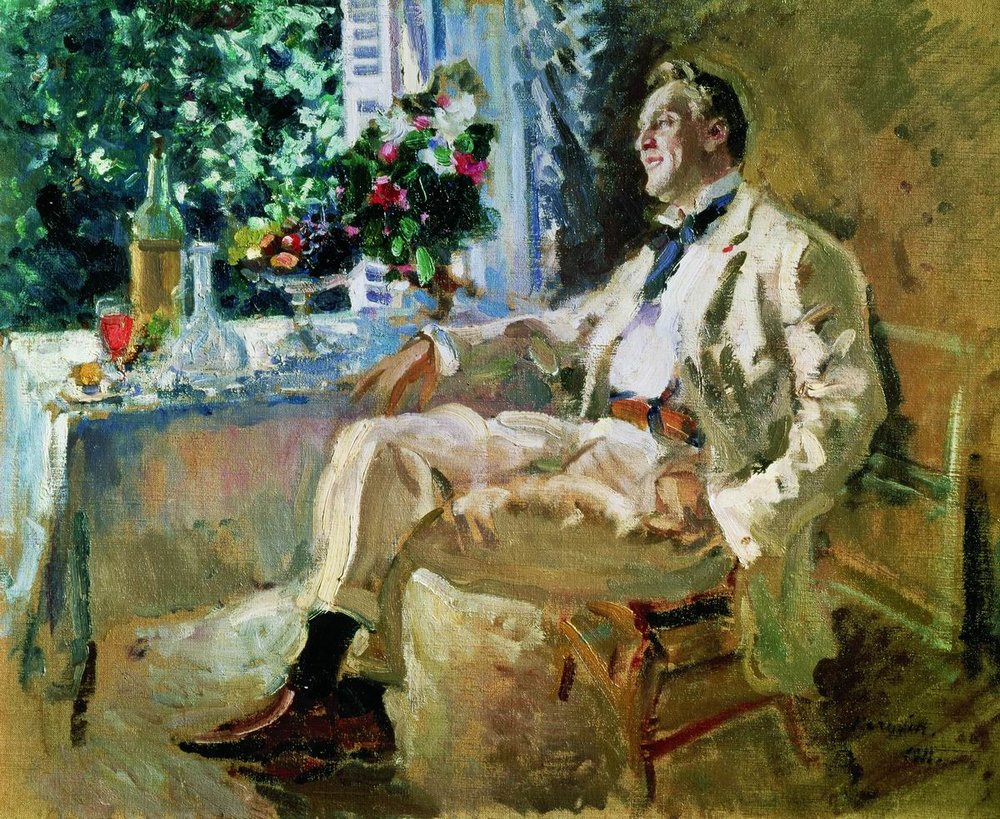
Feodor Chaliapin. 1915

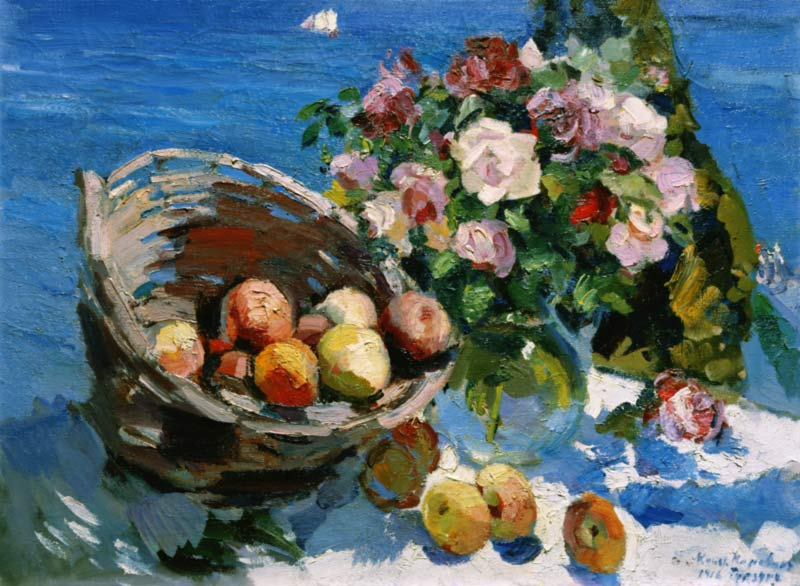
Gurzuf. 1916

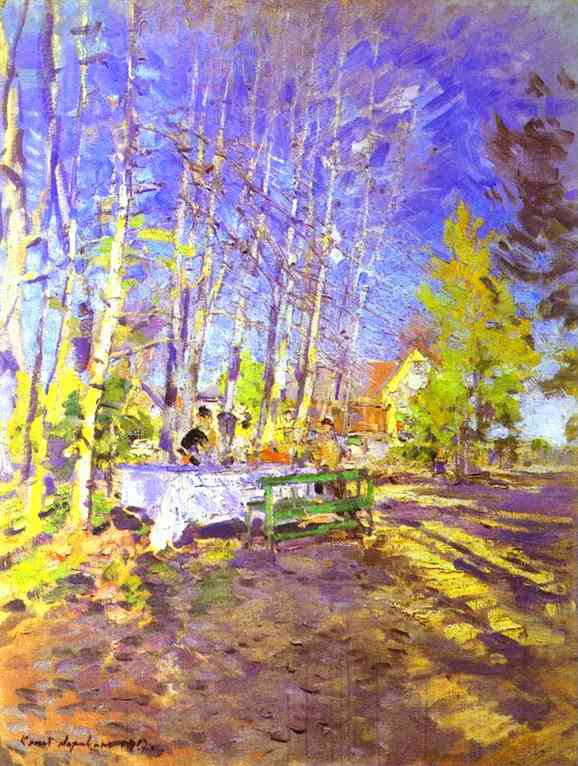
Spring. 1917

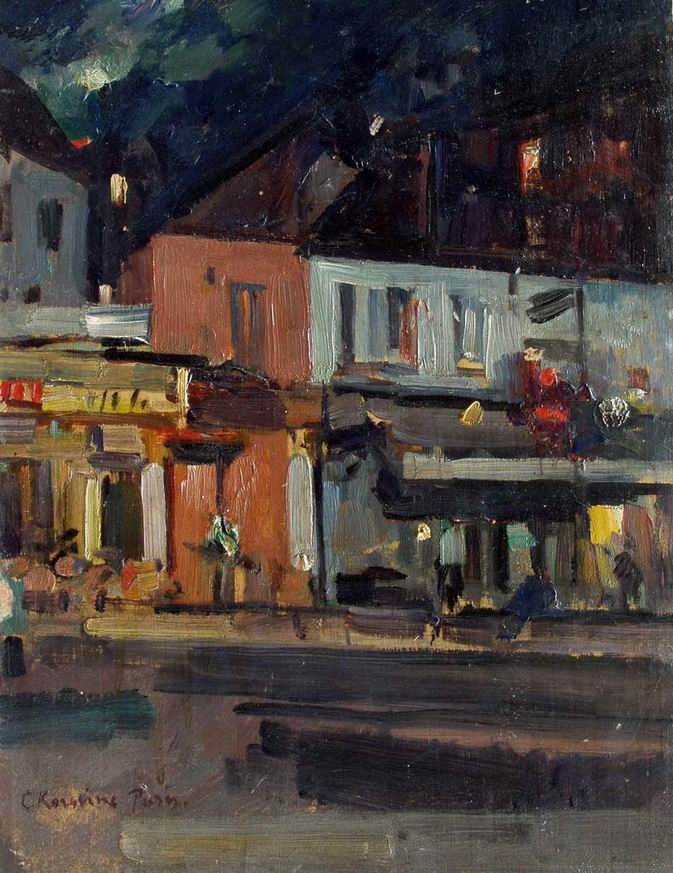
Moonlit Night. Paris. 1929

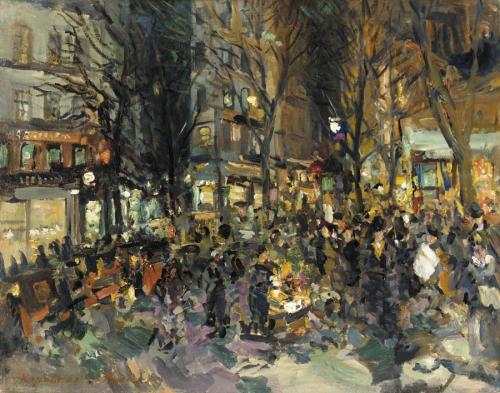
Parisian Street Scene

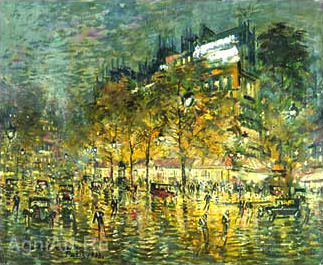
Paris. 1933

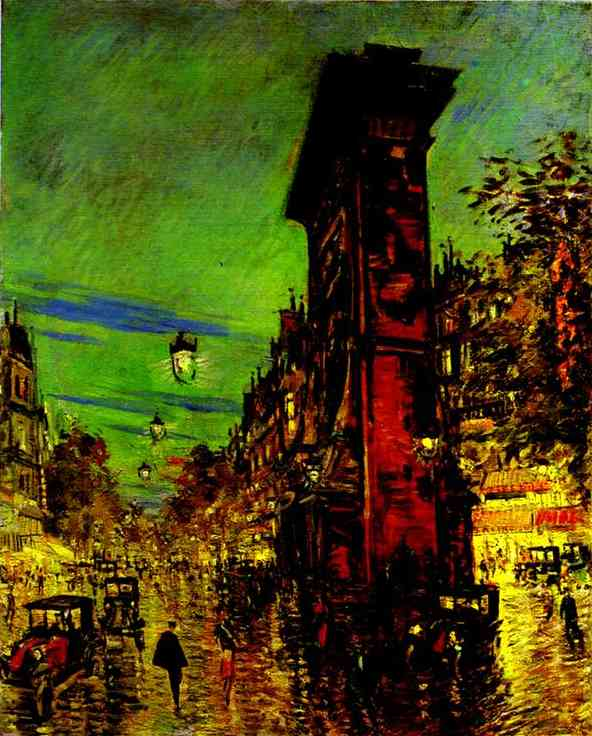
Paris, Arch of Saint Denis. 1930s

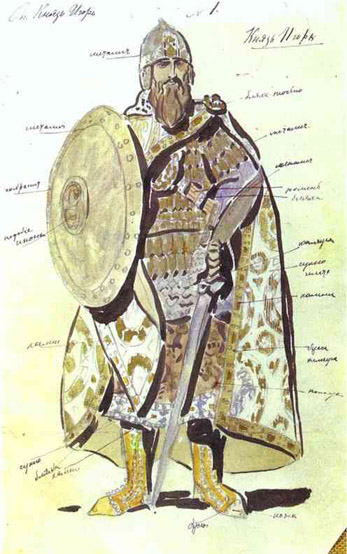
Costume design for Prince Igor
