= Siege of Narva (1590) =

Siege of Narva in 1590

- Part of the Russo-Swedish War (1590–1595)
Date	31 January – 19 February 1590
Location	Narva
Result	Swedish victory
Territorial changes	Sweden cedes Ivangorod and Korpore to Russia

Belligerents
Sweden	Tsardom of Russia

Commanders and leaders
Karl Henriksson Horn	(Tsardom of Russia) Feodor I

Units involved
Narva garrison	Unknown

Strength
400 men	30,000–100,000 (Note: The size of the army that invaded Ingria in 1590)

Casualties and losses
Unknown	Heavy

The siege of Narva was an unsuccessful Russian siege of the Swedish controlled city of Narva during the early stages of the Russo-Swedish War (1590–1595).

== Background ==
On 6 January 1590, the Truce of Plussa expired, and Swedish attempts to extend the peace with Russia failed mostly because the Swedish king, John III, made the Swedish demands too big, leading to the Russians getting irritated. Following this, several raids would break out.

Later, a large Russian army under the leadership of Tsar Feodor I of Russia invaded Ingria. The size of this army has been said to have been between 30,000 and 100,000 men strong. Jama fell on 27 January after a Swedish capitulation, resulting in all of western Ingria falling into Russian control, and Feodor would consequently march towards Narva.

== Siege ==
After having taken these fortresses, the Russian army turned to Narva, arriving and quickly surrounding it on 31 January. The Swedish garrison was small, only amounting to some 400 men, and the supplies inside were not large enough for a long siege. However, in Wesenberg, there were thousands of Swedes under Gustaf Banér, who had been appointed the Governor of Estonia. Karl Henriksson Horn, the commander at Narva, sent requests to Baner and asked him to quickly send his forces to Narva, but Baner decided that his force was too small to break through the Russian army and into Narva.

The situation in Narva quickly became precarious, one Russian assault after the other was repulsed by the Swedes, with each failed attack resulting in large losses for the Russians. On 19 February, the largest Russian assault began. Using holes blown through the walls of Narva, thousands of Russians rushed into the city to "plunder and rape". However, a concentrated Swedish counterattack stopped the Russian assault. After four hours of fighting, all of the Russians were either dead or repulsed, and their attack had failed.

Despite these failures, the Russians came back in a new powerful attack some days later, but were once again repulsed. In the Swedish garrison, several had either been killed or wounded in the attacks. Narva was slowly becoming a ruin as a result of the Russian artillery shelling the walls continuously from 4 to 19 February. The Russians came so close to Narva's walls that they could deploy their heavy mortars, which hurled fireballs high above the walls and into the city.

Horn looked at the large Russian army and started pondering, if the Swedes failed to repel another attack, Narva would fall and as a result Estonia would do the same. The burghers began begging Horn to begin negotiations with the Russians, and after thinking about it for a while he sent a parliamentarian to the Russian commander, who accepted to negotiate with Horn.

== Aftermath ==
After negotiating, both sides agreed on a new truce, which would be in effect untl January 1591. This truce did come at a cost, however, as the Swedes had to surrender Ivangorod and Koporye, but Narva would remain in Swedish hands.

== See also ==
- Siege of Narva (1581) – Siege of Narva in 1581
- Siege of Narva (1704) – 1704 siege during the Great Northern War
- Siege of Narva (1558) – 1558 military conflict in Estonia during Livonian War

== Works cited ==
- Sundberg, Ulf (2010). Sveriges krig 1448-1630 [Sweden's wars 1448-1630] (in Swedish). Svenskt militärhistoriskt bibliotek. ISBN 9789185789627.
- Isacson, Claes-Göran (2006). Vägen till stormakt : Vasaättens krig [The road to great power: The wars of the Vasa dynasty] (in Swedish). Norstedts. ISBN 9789113015026.
