= Pechenga Monastery =

Historic monastery in Murmansk Oblast, Russia

Coordinates: 69°32′39.94″N 31°12′47.15″E

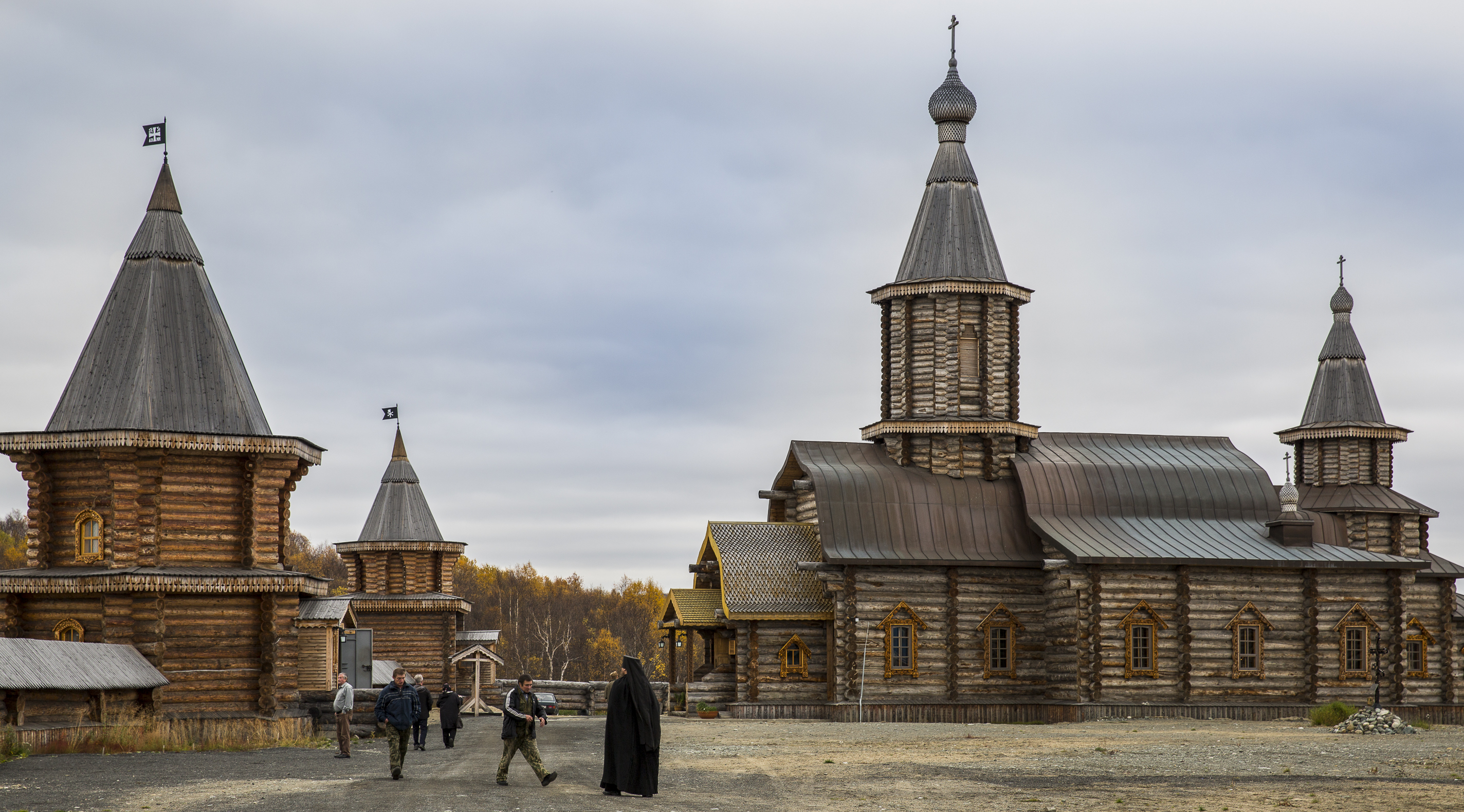
The monastery in 2014

The Pechenga Monastery (Russian: Печенгский монастырь; Finnish: Petsamon luostari; Norwegian: Petsjengaklosteret) is and has been for many centuries the northernmost monastery in the world. It was founded in 1533 at the influx of the Pechenga River into the Barents Sea, 135 km west of modern Murmansk, by St. Tryphon, a monk from Novgorod.

== History ==
Inspired by the model of the Solovki, Tryphon wished to convert the local Skolts to Christianity and to demonstrate how faith could flourish in the most inhospitable lands. His example was eagerly followed by other Russian monks. By 1572, the Pechenga Monastery counted about 50 brethren and 200 lay followers.

Six years after St. Tryphon's death in 1583, the wooden monastery was raided and burnt down by the Swedes on December 25, 1589. It is said that the raid claimed the lives of 51 monks and 65 lay brothers, bringing the history of Tryphon's establishment to an end. This revenge raid, and was part of the Russo-Swedish War of 1590–1595, is said to have been carried out by a Finnish peasant chief Pekka Antinpoika Vesainen, but the claim is contested.

In 1591 Tsar Fyodor I ordered to revive the monastery in the vicinity of Kola, but the new hermitage fell in flames in 1619. Although the New Pechenga Monastery was eventually moved to the town itself, it was so sparsely settled that the Holy Synod deemed it wise to disband it in 1764. As the Russian colonization of the Kola Peninsula accelerated in the late 19th century, the Pechenga Monastery was restored at its original location in 1886. Prior to the Russian Revolution, it consisted of the Upper Monastery, commemorating the graves of Tryphon and 116 martyrs of the 1589 raid, and the new Lower Monastery, overlooking the Pechenga Bay.

The stauropegic monastery continued to flourish when Pechenga became part of Finland in 1920. At the end of the Continuation War in 1944 the Moscow Armistice granted Petsamo to the Soviet Union. The brethren were evacuated to the New Valamo Monastery, where they kept their autonomy until 1984 when the last of them died at the age of 110. Although the monastery buildings were destroyed during the war, the Russian Orthodox Church decreed the reestablishment of the monastery in Pechenga in 1997.

== Gallery ==
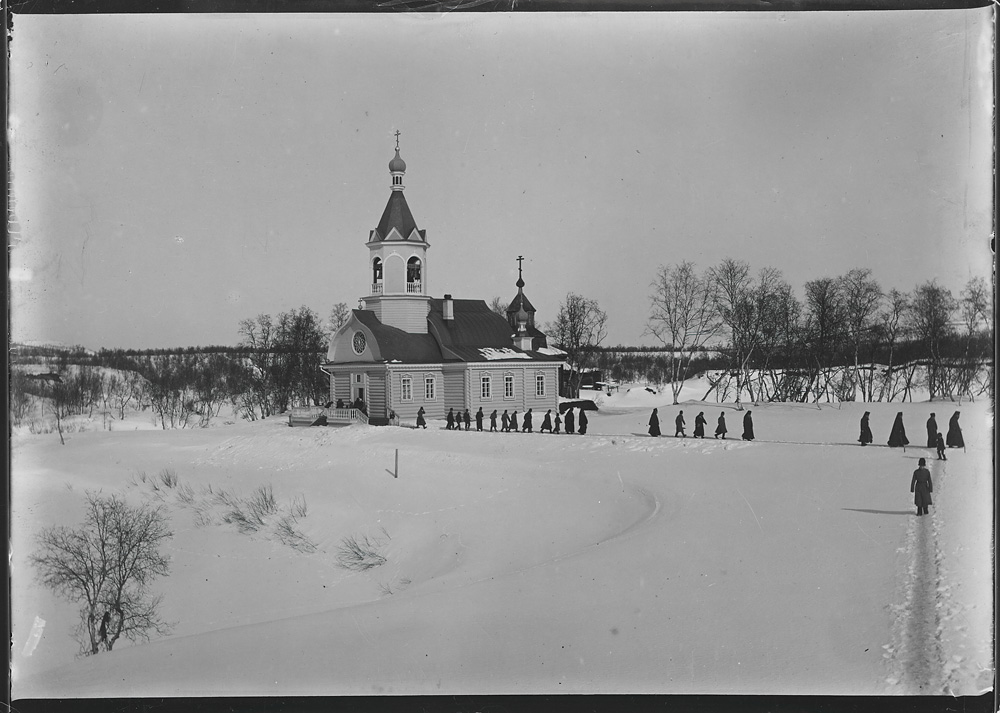
The monastery church c. 1911
(photo by Ellisif Wessel)

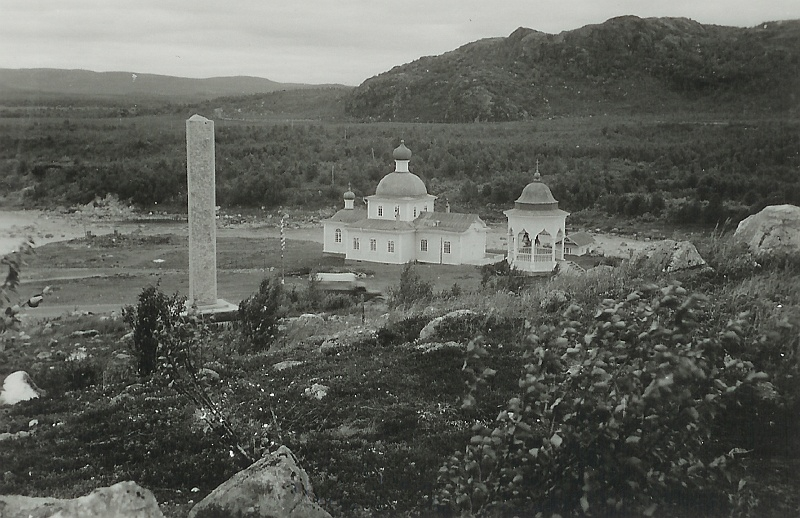
The church in the 1940s

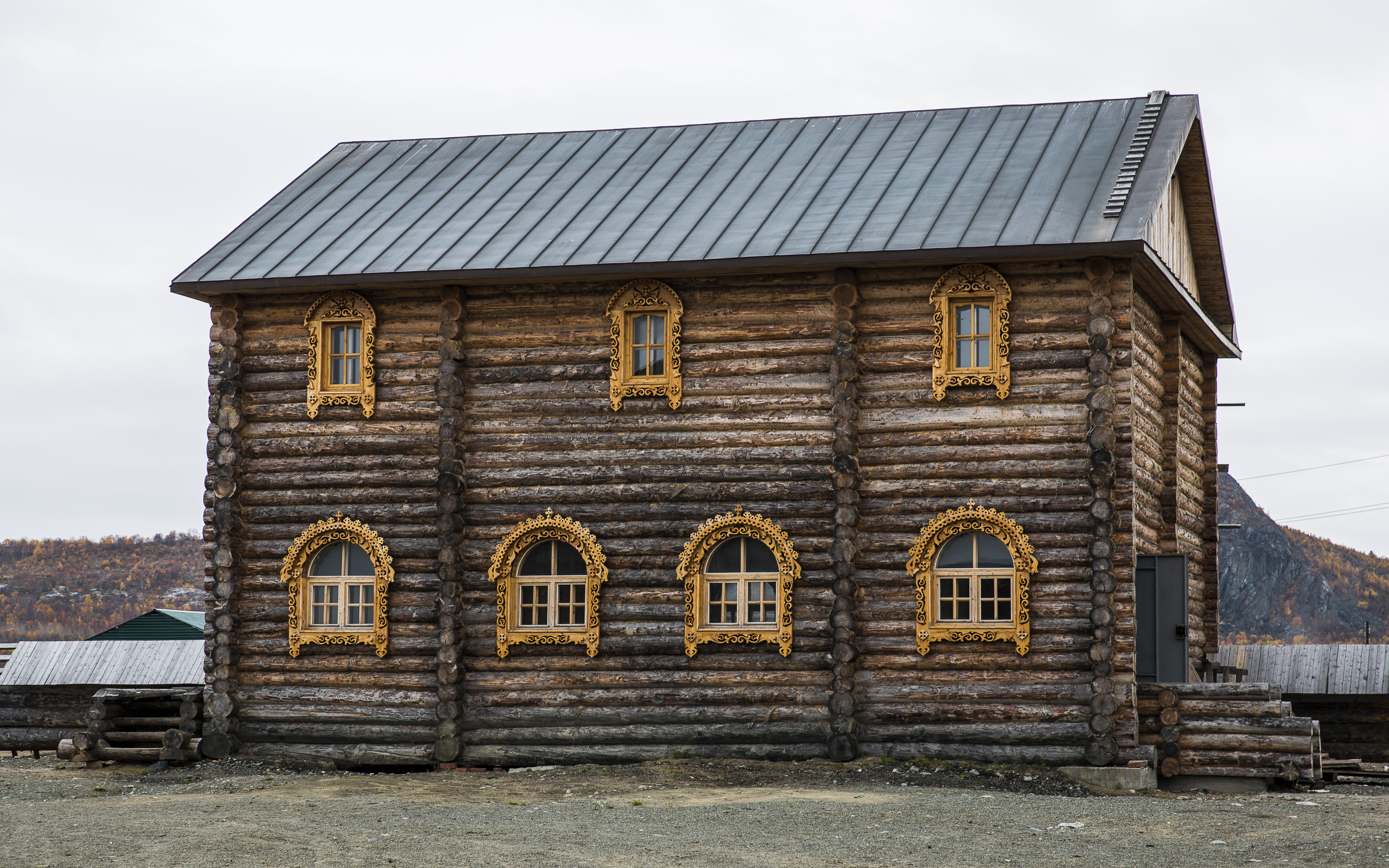

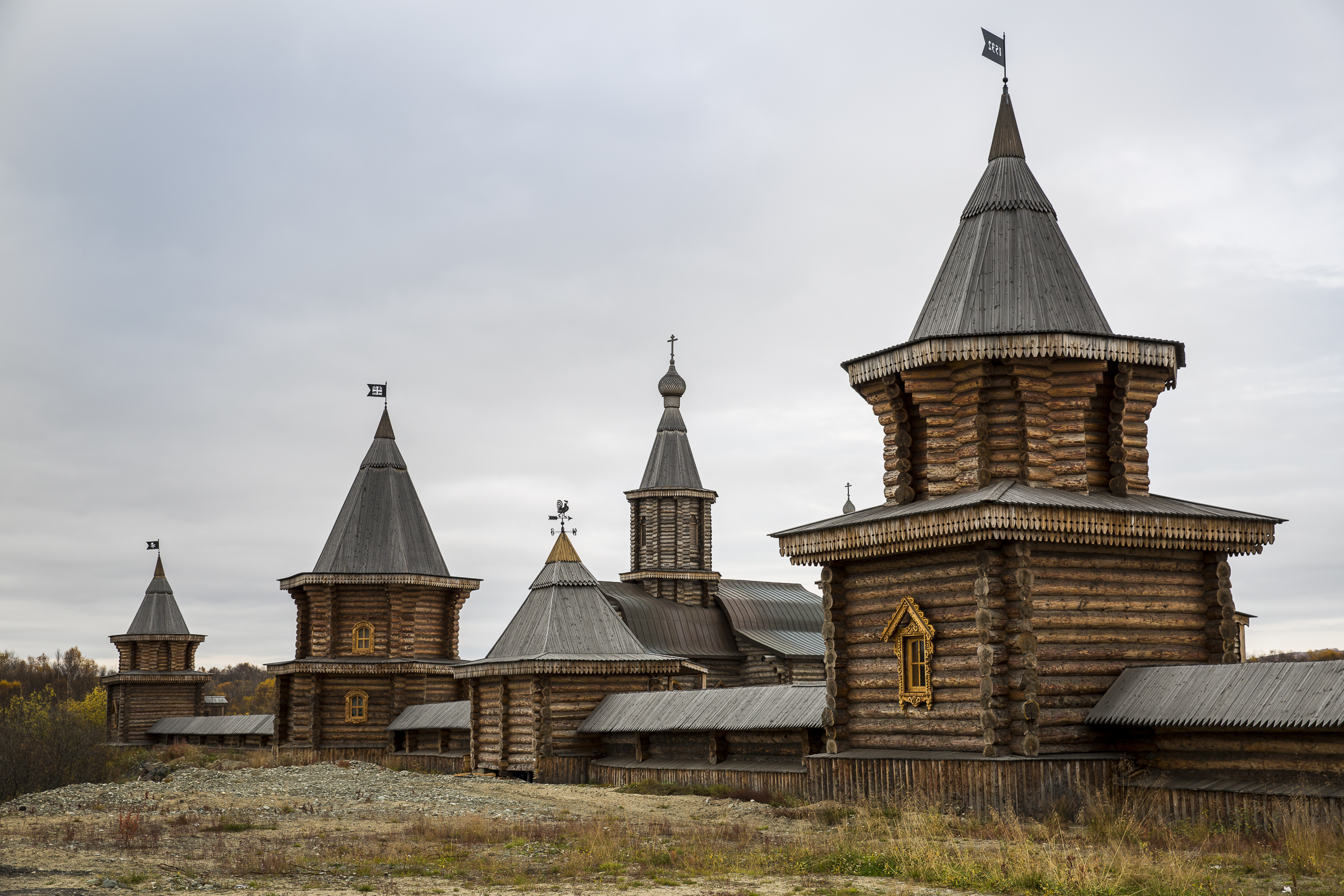
Modern buildings
