= Hubynykha =

Rural locality in Dnipropetrovsk Oblast, Ukraine

Hubynykha Губиниха
- Rural settlement
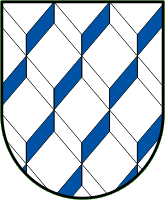
- Coat of arms

- Location in Dnipropetrovsk Oblast Location in Ukraine
- Coordinates: 48°48′19″N 35°15′29″E
- Country: Ukraine
- Oblast: Dnipropetrovsk Oblast
- Raion: Samar Raion
- Hromada: Hubynukha settlement hromada

Population (2022)
  - Total: 5,332
- Time zone: UTC+2 (EET)
  - Summer (DST): UTC+3 (EEST)

Hubynykha (Ukrainian: Губиниха; Russian: Губиниха) is a rural settlement in Samar Raion, Dnipropetrovsk Oblast, Ukraine. It is located on the Hubynykha, a left tributary of the Kilchen, in the basin of the Dnieper. Hubynykha hosts the administration of Hubynykha settlement hromada, one of the hromadas of Ukraine. Population: 5,323 (2022 estimate).

Until 26 January 2024, Hubynykha was designated urban-type settlement. On this day, a new law entered into force which abolished this status, and Hubynykha became a rural settlement.

== Climate ==
Climate data for Hubynykha (1981–2010)
Month	Jan	Feb	Mar	Apr	May	Jun	Jul	Aug	Sep	Oct	Nov	Dec	Year
Mean daily maximum °C (°F)	−1.4 (29.5)	−0.8 (30.6)	5.4 (41.7)	15.0 (59.0)	21.7 (71.1)	25.1 (77.2)	27.4 (81.3)	27.0 (80.6)	20.9 (69.6)	13.3 (55.9)	4.7 (40.5)	−0.2 (31.6)	13.2 (55.8)
Daily mean °C (°F)	−4.0 (24.8)	−3.9 (25.0)	1.4 (34.5)	9.5 (49.1)	15.9 (60.6)	19.4 (66.9)	21.5 (70.7)	20.7 (69.3)	15.1 (59.2)	8.5 (47.3)	1.6 (34.9)	−2.7 (27.1)	8.6 (47.5)
Mean daily minimum °C (°F)	−6.7 (19.9)	−6.9 (19.6)	−1.9 (28.6)	4.6 (40.3)	10.0 (50.0)	13.9 (57.0)	16.1 (61.0)	14.5 (58.1)	9.9 (49.8)	4.4 (39.9)	−1.0 (30.2)	−5.4 (22.3)	4.3 (39.7)
Average precipitation mm (inches)	43.0 (1.69)	36.9 (1.45)	40.3 (1.59)	39.4 (1.55)	47.5 (1.87)	73.7 (2.90)	52.9 (2.08)	46.6 (1.83)	47.2 (1.86)	42.1 (1.66)	45.4 (1.79)	42.0 (1.65)	557.0 (21.93)
Average precipitation days (≥ 1.0 mm)	9.1	7.4	7.9	6.9	7.0	8.3	7.1	5.2	6.1	5.9	7.6	8.3	86.8
Average relative humidity (%)	86.7	83.8	78.3	65.6	61.7	67.5	66.7	63.3	68.6	76.5	86.3	87.3	74.4
Source: World Meteorological Organization

== Economy ==
=== Transportation ===
Hubynykha railway station is on the railway connecting Dnipro and Berestyn with further connections to Kharkiv and Sloviansk. There is regular passenger traffic.

The settlement has access to Highway M18 connecting Kharkiv with Zaporizhzhia and Melitopol and to Highway M29 which connects Dnipro and Kharkiv.

== Notable people ==
- Oleksandr Harbuz - hero of Ukraine was born in Hubynykha.
