= Pekka Vesainen =

Pekka Vesainen was a famous 16th century Finnish peasant leader and guerrilla chief during the "long wrath" or "pitkä viha".

The long restlessness of Russo-Swedish war was worst among settlements in Northern Ostrobothnia region, which was officially then beyond the Russian border of the Treaty of Nöteborg. The long and cruel guerrilla war without any outside help created eventually need of warlords to take care of the protection of the settlers. The most famous figure of this period is Pekka Vesainen.

A raiding party of peasants from Ii, led by Vesainen, destroyed and burned Kandalaksha (Kantalahti) and a small Russian settlement in Kem in summer 1589. They took a considerable loot with them back to Ii. According to oral tradition and historical speculation from later centuries, Vesainen would have also led another raid later on same year, on which the peasants destroyed the Pechenga Monastery and killed all the monks. This raid did actually take place, but Vesainen is not known to have anything to do with it.

== See also ==
- Russo-Swedish War (1590-1595)
