= Siege of Narva (1558) =

1558 military conflict in Estonia during Livonian War

- Part of the Livonian War
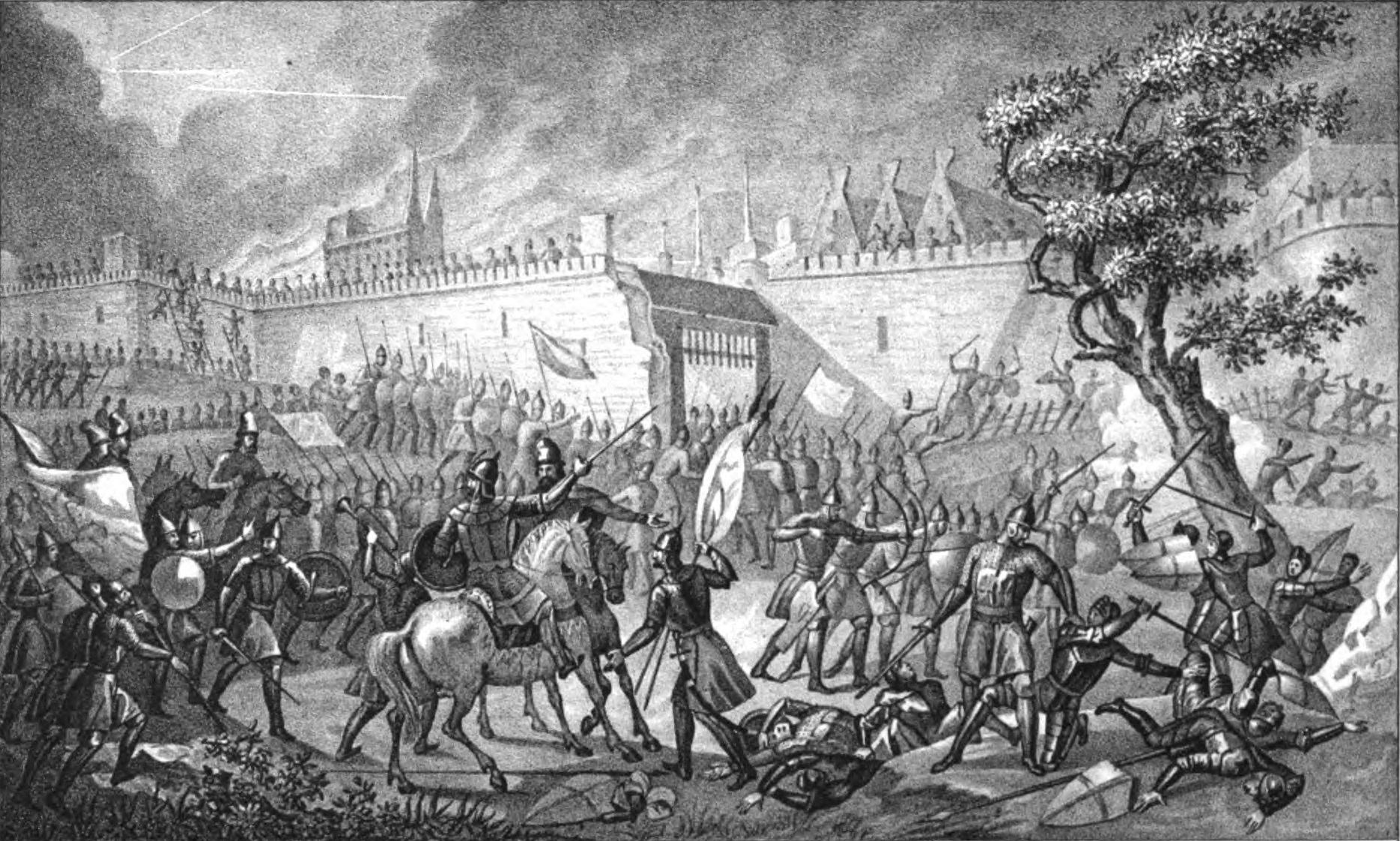
- Siege of Narva by the Russians in 1558 by Boris Chorikov, 1836.
Date	April - May 1558
Location	Narva, Livonian Confederation in modern Estonia 59°22′45″N 28°12′02″E
Result	Russian victory
Territorial changes	Narva is captured by Russian forces

Belligerents
Livonian Confederation	Tsardom of Russia

Commanders and leaders
Focht Schnellenberg	Ivan Mikhailovich Viskovatyi

The siege of Narva (Estonian: Narva piiramine; Russian: Осада Нарвы) was a Russian siege of the Livonian city of Narva (in modern-day eastern Estonia) from April through May 1558, during the Livonian War. After capturing the city in July 1558, the Russians used Narva as a trading center and port to move goods from Pskov and Novgorod. The Russians controlled the city until 1581, when it was captured by Swedish forces under Pontus De La Gardie.

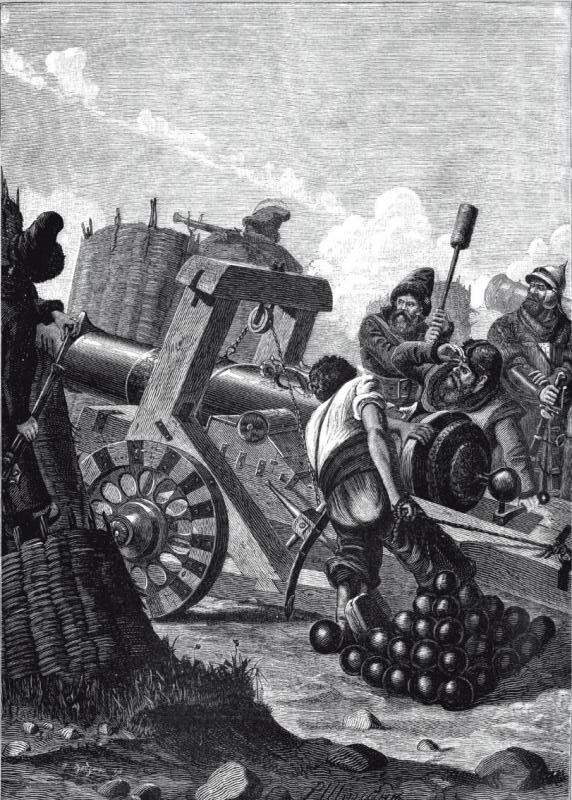
16th-century Russian siege weapon
