= Pechenga (river) =

River in Murmansk Oblast, Russia

Coordinates: 69°34′51″N 31°16′05″E

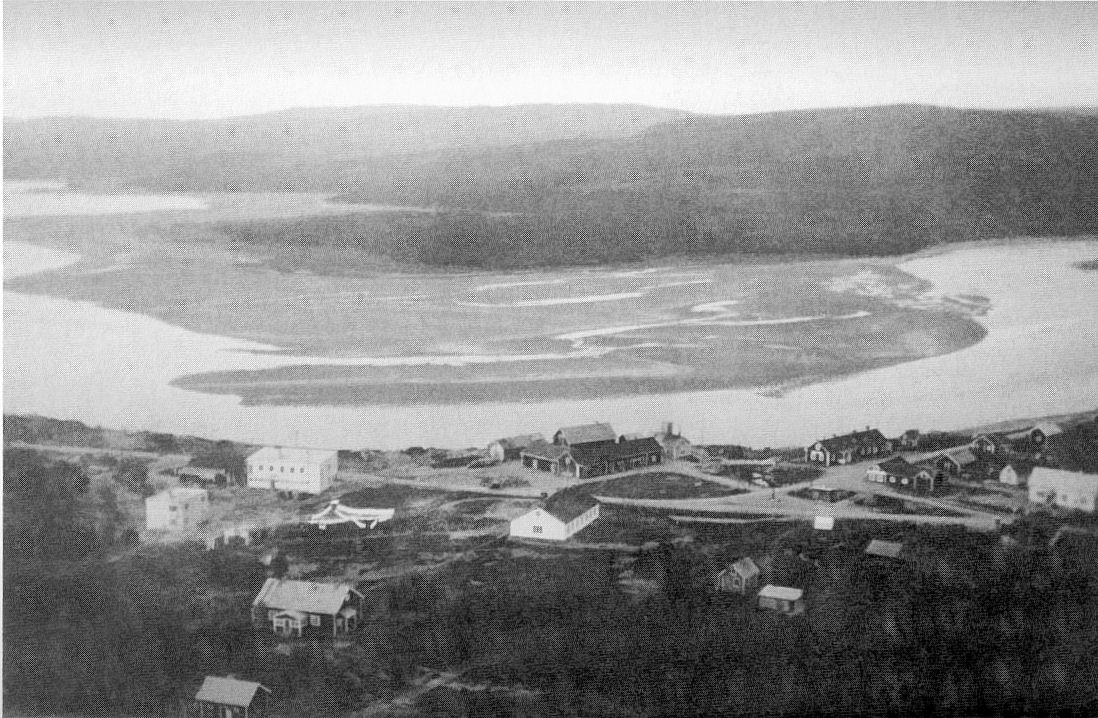

The Pechenga (Russian: Пече́нга, Finnish: Petsamonjoki) is a river in Murmansk Oblast, Russia (Kola Peninsula). It is the namesake for the Pechenga settlement, Pechenga Monastery and the Pechenga District. The river discharges into the Pechenga Bay by the Barents Sea coast. The Luostari/Pechenga airbase is located along the west bank of the Pechenga near Luostari at Korzunovo.

The river is heavily contaminated by heavy metals due to mining operations in the river basin.
