= Russo-Swedish War (1590–1595) =

War between the Tsardom of Russia and Sweden

- Part of the Russo-Swedish wars
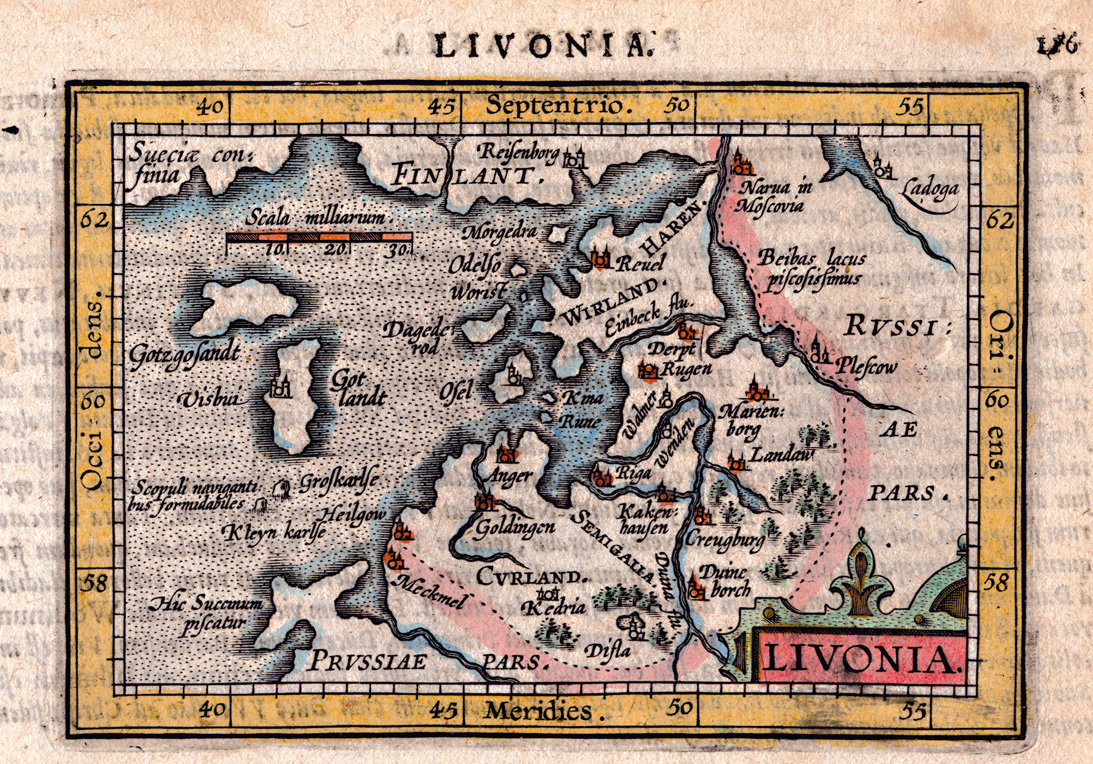
- Pre-war map of Livonia showing Narva as part of Russia
Date	1590–1595
Location	Ingria, Estonia, Finland
Result	Disputed, see result
Territorial changes	Russia formally recognizes northern Finland as part of Sweden; Russia abandons its claims to Estonia and Narva; Sweden cedes Kexholm and Ingria back to Russia

Belligerents
Sweden	Russia

Commanders and leaders
John III; Arvid Stålarm; Pekka Vesainen	(Tsardom of Russia) Feodor I (Tsardom of Russia) Boris Godunov (Tsardom of Russia) Bogdan Belsky (Tsardom of Russia) Fyodor Mstislavsky (Tsardom of Russia) Prince Trubetskoy (Tsardom of Russia) Vladimir Dolgorukov (POW)

Strength
Unknown	25,000

Casualties and losses
Unknown	Unknown

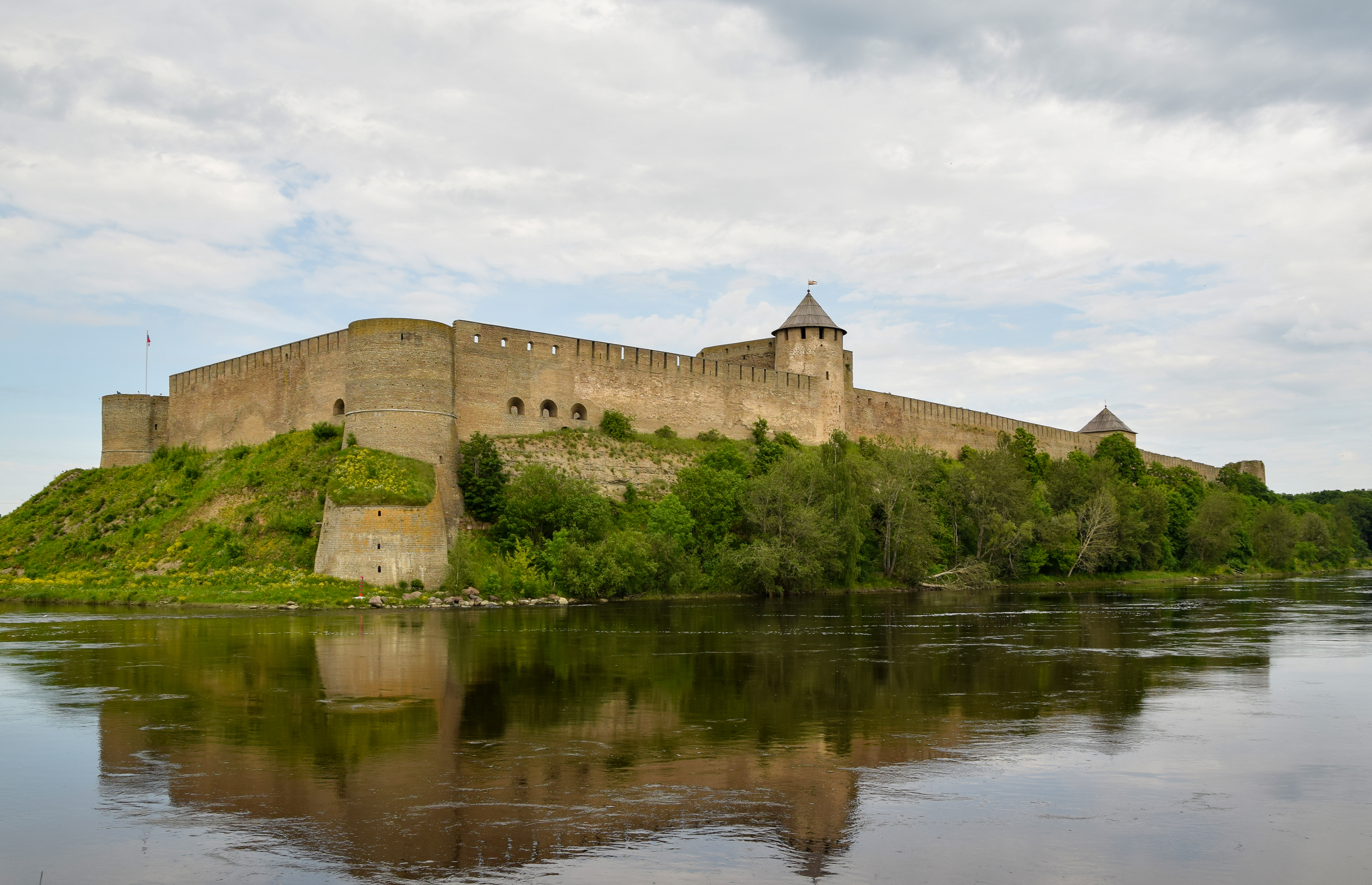
The Ivangorod Fortress

The Russo-Swedish War of 1590–1595 was instigated by Boris Godunov in the hope of gaining the territory of the Duchy of Estonia along the Gulf of Finland belonging to Sweden since the previous Livonian War. As soon as the Truce of Plussa expired early in 1590, a large Russian army led by Godunov and his sickly brother-in-law, Feodor I of Russia, marched from Moscow towards Novgorod. On 18 January they crossed the river Narva, defeated a Swedish detachment in a counter battle and laid siege to the Swedish castle of Narva, commanded by Arvid Stålarm. Another important fortress, Jama (Jamburg), fell to Russian forces within two weeks. Simultaneously, the Russians ravaged Estonia as far as Reval (Tallinn) and Finland as far as Helsinki.

On 25 February, the local Swedish governor, Karl Henriksson (Horn), was compelled to sign an armistice, which obliged Sweden to surrender the territories won by the Treaty of Plussa — namely Jama, Koporye, and Ivangorod. This peace settlement displeased John III of Sweden, who sent a fleet to take hold of Ivangorod, but this attempt to besiege the fortress was checked by a Russian castellan. Matters then remained quiet until summer 1591, when the Swedes struck against Gdov, capturing a local governor, Prince Vladimir Dolgorukov.

The other war theatre was East Karelia, where the Swedes sacked Kola and other Russian settlements bordering the White Sea. A raiding party allegedly led by Finnish peasant chief Pekka Vesainen, destroyed the Pechenga Monastery on 25 December 1589, killing 50 monks and 65 lay brothers. He then turned his troops to Kola Fjord but could not manage to destroy the Kola Fortress due to lack of men. Instead he captured and burned Kandalaksha (Kantalahti) and a small Russian settlement in Kem. Again, due to lack of men, he could not capture the Solovetsky Monastery on the Solovetsky Islands.

Godunov's government gradually overcame those setbacks, as Prince Volkonsky was sent to pacify Karelia, and the noblest Russian generals Bogdan Belsky, Fedor Mstislavsky, and Prince Trubetskoy devastated Finland. Then, the war settled into indecisive skirmishing from which it would not subsequently emerge. Three years elapsed before Sweden, in May 1595, agreed to sign the Treaty of Teusina (Tyavzino, Tyavzin, Täyssinä). It restored to Russia all territory ceded in the Treaty of Plussa of 1583 to Sweden except for Narva. Russia had to renounce all claims on Estonia, including Narva, and Sweden's sovereignty over Estonia from 1561 was confirmed.

== Result ==
There are numerous scholarly sources that says the war ended with a Swedish victory, and others that say it ended with a favourable outcome for Sweden.

Russian sources differ in their assessment, claiming Russian victory and the conclusion of a favorable peace on the terms of Moscow. The Cambridge History of Russia also notes Russia's victory in the war, but draws attention to the fact that not all the goals of the Russians were fulfilled. Some sources claim a military victory for Russia and a political draw. Another part of the sources does not name the winner in the war, but claims that the agreement was to some extent beneficial to both sides. However, most Russian-language sources do not indicate at all that the outcome of the war satisfied one of the parties. Other sources have also called the war a commercial victory for Sweden.
