= Roads in Azerbaijan =

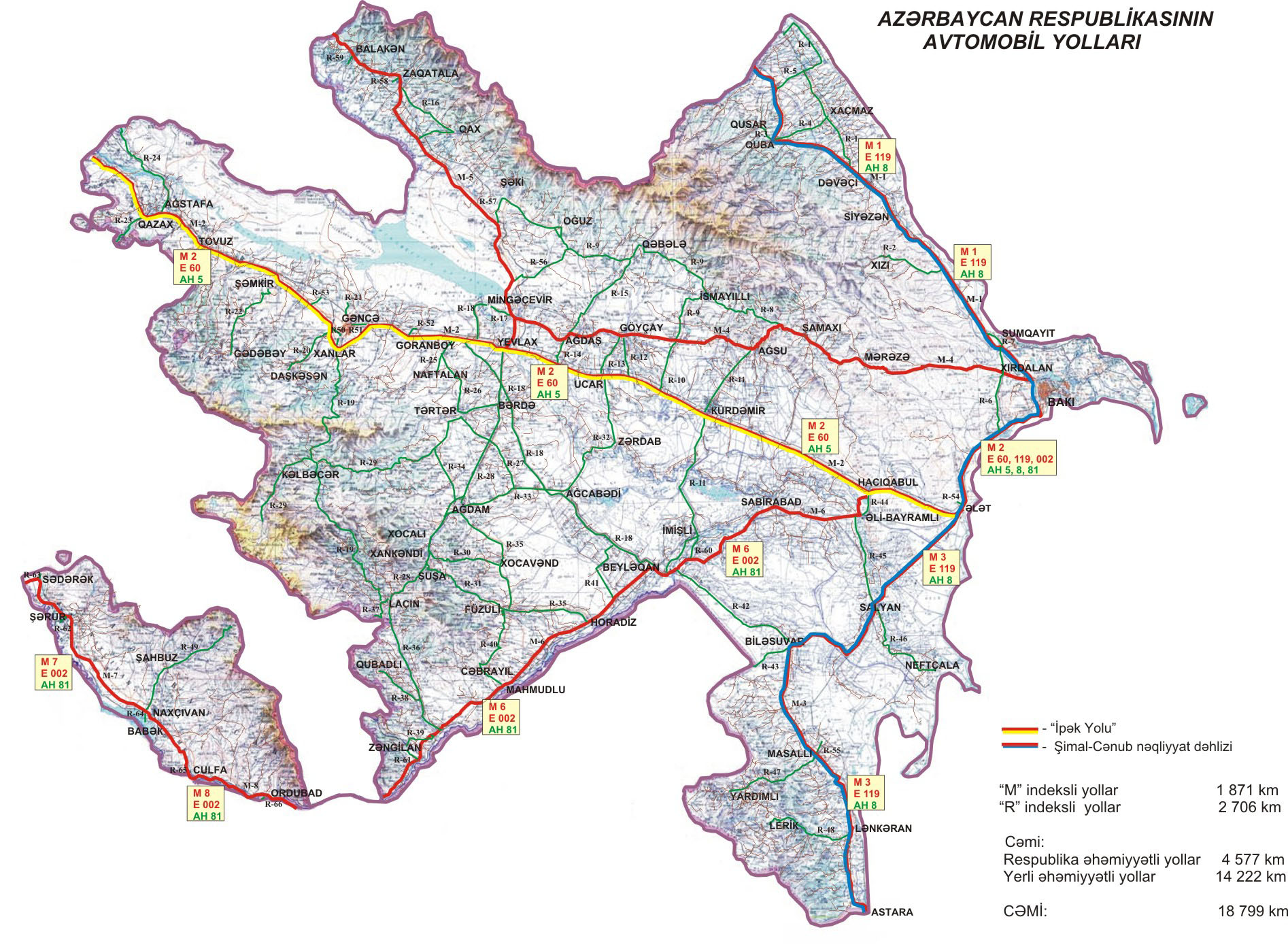
Road Map of Azerbaijan

Roads in Azerbaijan are the main transport network in Azerbaijan. With the railway network still undergoing modernization and not covering the entire country, especially mountainous areas and other areas with difficult topography, the road system is the most important form of transport in the country. Its role is important both with national, and as an important transit country, with international traffic.

Road signs in Azerbaijan

== Overview ==
Azerbaijan is an important country for international transit. The total length of the Azerbaijani road network is about 29,000 km, serving domestic cargo traffic and connecting to international highways. Because Azerbaijan's railway network is inadequate, roads provide the most important form of transport in the country. Highways are mostly in fair condition, but do not meet international standards for transit traffic. Smaller main and rural roads are in poor condition. All types of roads are undergoing rapid modernization with rehabilitation and extensions. For every 1,000 km^{2} of the national territory, there is 334 km of roads. In 2018, the Global Competitiveness Index ranked Azerbaijan 36th out of 137 countries for the quality (condition and extensiveness) of its road infrastructure.

== History ==
The first modern paved roads in Azerbaijan were built in the 19th century when it was part of the Russian Empire.

== Road classification ==
=== Motorways ===
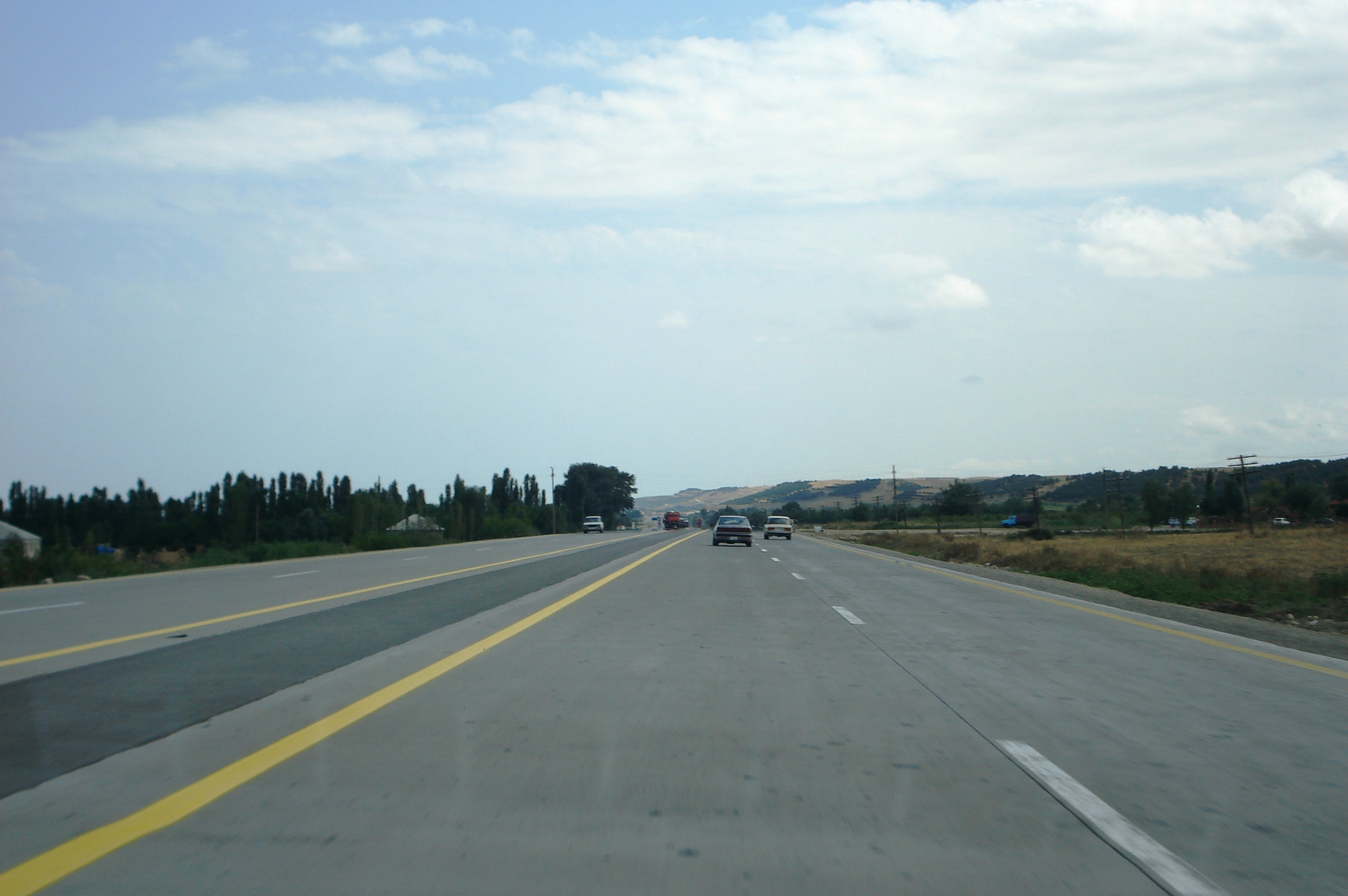
M2 Azerbaijan

The most important class of highways is motorways. They are designated with the letter M.

Azerbaijan has recently developed a network of multi-lane motorways, which are steadily being expanded. Especially around Baku, some of these roads are built to controlled-access highway standards. Most motorways have six lanes, whereas some in and near Baku have up to eight. In the cities, the motorways are illuminated.

=== Highways ===
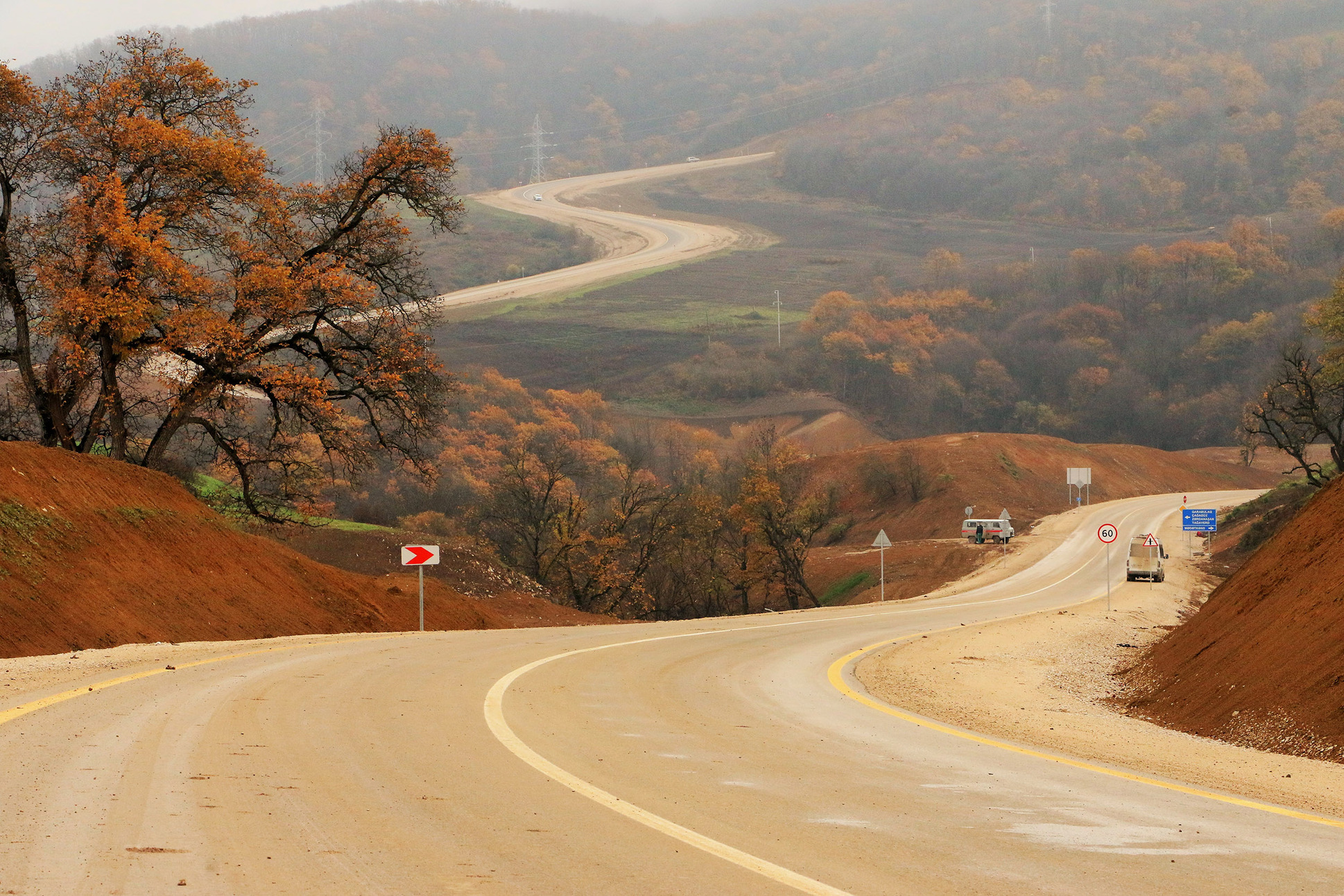
Fuzuli–Shusha highway

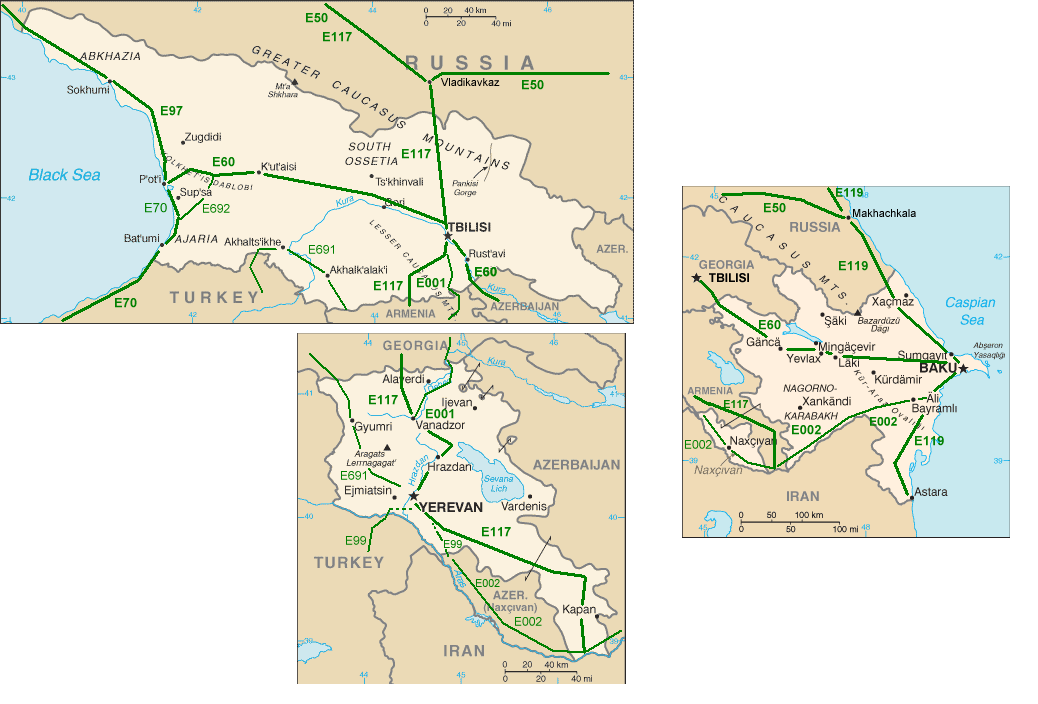

65 other highways are a level below M-level roads and connect main highways to communities. These highways are designated with the letter R. The highway network is four lanes wide, two in each direction. Like motorways, they are illuminated in the cities, but less frequently in towns. In Azerbaijan, highway signs are blue and the names of locations are printed in capital letters. The main highways in the country are

| Sign | Number | Route | Length | International numbers |
|---|---|---|---|---|
| | M1 | Baku – Abşeron – Sumqayıt – Xızı – Siyəzən – Şabran – Quba – Qusar – Xaçmaz – Russia | 203 km | European route E119 |
| | M2 | Baku – Tovuz – Georgia | 507 km | European route E60 |
| | M3 | Ələt – Salyan – Lənkəran – Astara – Iran (Astara) | 211 km | European route E119 |
| | M4 | Baku – Shamakhi – Agsu – Goychay – Agdash | 253 km | |
| | M5 | Yevlakh – Shaki – Zaqatala – Balakən | 184 km | |
| | M6 | Hajiqabul – Şirvan – Bəhramtəpə – Horadiz – Zəngilan – Armenia (closed) | 290 km | European route E002 |
| | M7 | Nakhchivan – Babək – Kəngərli – Şərur – Sədərək – Turkey | 81 km | European route E99 |
| | M8 | Culfa – Ordubad – Armenia (closed) | 89 km | European route E002 |

=== Roads of Local Importance ===
| Sign | Number | Route | Length |
|---|---|---|---|
| | R1 | Qəndob – Xaçmaz – Xudat – Yalama – Russia European route E119 | 88 km |
| | R2 | Giləzi – Xızı | 31 km |
| | R3 | Quba – Qusar | 12 km |
| | R4 | Quba – Xaçmaz | 22 km |
| | R5 | Qusar – Xudat | 29 km |
| | R6 | Hacı Zeynalabdin – Sahil | 40 km |
| | R7 | Hacı Zeynalabdin – Sumqayıt | 18 km |
| | R8 | Muğanlı – İsmayıllı | 40 km |
| | R9 | Qaraməryəm – İsmayıllı – Şəki – Oğuz | 158 km |
| | R10 | Qaraməryəm – Müsüslü | 22 km |
| | R11 | Ağsu – Kürdəmir – İmişli – Bəhramtəpə | 113 km |
| | R12 | Göyçay – Bərgüşad | 18 km |
| | R13 | Göyçay – Ucar | 20 km |
| | R14 | Ağdaş – Ləki | 10 km |
| | R15 | Ağdaş – Zarağan | 45 km |
| | R16 | Qorağan – Qax – Zaqatala | 43 km |
| | R17 | Xaldan – Mingəçevir | 13 km |
| | R18 | Mingəçevir – Mingəçevir Hydro Power Plant – Bəhramtəpə | 166 km |
| | R19 | Ganja – Kəlbəcər – Laçın | 200 km |
| | R20 | Ganja – Daşkəsən | 38 km |
| | R21 | Ganja – Samux | 8 km |
| | R22 | Şəmkir – Gədəbəy | 45 km |
| | R23 | Qazax – Uzuntala – Armenia (closed) | 14 km |
| | R24 | Ağstafa – Poylu – Georgia | 54 km |
| | R25 | Goranboy – Naftalan | 18 km |
| | R26 | Goranboy – Tərtər | 35 km |
| | R27 | Tərtər – Hindarx | 41 km |
| | R28 | Yevlax – Xocalı – Laçın – Xankəndi – Şuşa | 154 km |
| | R29 | Bərdə – İstisu – Kəlbəcər | 164 km |
| | R30 | Xankəndi – Xocavənd | 42 km |
| | R31 | Shusha – Fuzuli | 53 km |
| | R32 | Ucar – Zərdab – Ağcabədi | 76 km |
| | R33 | Ağdam – Hindarx – Ağcabədi | 48 km |
| | R34 | Ağdam – Ağdərə | 26 km |
| | R35 | Aghdam – Fuzuli – Horadiz – Xocavənd | 94 km |
| | R36 | Lachin – Həkəri | 83 km |
| | R37 | Lachin – Zabux – Armenia (closed) | 23 km |
| | R38 | Qubadlı – Xanlıq | 16 km |
| | R39 | Həkəri – Zəngilan | 23 km |
| | R40 | Fuzuli – Cəbrayil – Mahmudlu | 46 km |
| | R41 | Yuxarı Qarabağ Kanalı – Beyləqan – Daşburun | 32 km |
| | R42 | Bəhramtəpə – Biləsuvar | 62 km |
| | R43 | Biləsuvar – Iran European route E119 | 19 km |
| | R44 | Hacıqabul – Shirvan | 11 km |
| | R45 | Şirvan – Noxudlu – Salyan | 43 km |
| | R46 | Salyan – Neftçala | 40 km |
| | R47 | Masallı – Yardımlı | 53 km |
| | R48 | Lankaran – Lerik | 55 km |
| | R49 | Nakhchivan – Şahbuz – Armenia (closed) | 65 km |
| | R50 | M2 (371 km) – Ganja International Airport | 11 km |
| | R51 | M2 (336 km) – Ganja | 8 km |
| | R52 | M2 (317 km) – Train station Kürəkçay | 5 km |
| | R53 | M2 (376 km) – Train station Alabaşlı | 8 km |
| | R54 | M2 (70 km) – Train station Ələt | 5 km |
| | R55 | M3 (220 km) – Train station Masallı | 5 km |
| | R56 | M5 (17 km) – Kərimli | 31 km |
| | R57 | M5 (46 km) – Şəki | 12 km |
| | R58 | M5 (128 km) – Train station Zaqatala | 9 km |
| | R59 | M5 (150 km) – Train station Balakən | 2 km |
| | R60 | M6 (94 km) – İmişli | 7 km |
| | R61 | M6 (250 km) – Zəngilan | 11 km |
| | R62 | M7 (58 km) – Şərur | 4 km |
| | R63 | M7 (80 km) – Sədərək - Turkey State road D.080 (Turkey) | 8 km |
| | R64 | M8 (3 km) – Babək | 3 km |
| | R65 | M8 (44 km) – Culfa | 2 km |
| | R66 | M8 (75 km) – Train station Ordubad | 5 km |

== European routes ==
- – 8,200 km (5,100 mi): Brest – Quimper – Concarneau – Quimperlé – Lorient – Vannes – La Roche Bernard – Savenay – Nantes – Ancenis – Angers – Saumur – Tours – Blois – Orléans – Montargis – Auxerre – Avallon – Beaune – Dole – Besançon – Montbéliard – Belfort – Mulhouse – Basel – Brugg – Baden – Zürich – Winterthur – Frauenfeld – Wil– St. Gallen – St. Margrethen – Bregenz – Lauterach – Dornbirn – Feldkirch – Bludenz – Landeck – Imst – Telfs – Innsbruck – Wörgl – Rosenheim – Bad Reichenhall – Salzburg – Gmunden – Sattledt – Linz – Amstetten – Melk – Sankt Pölten – Vienna – Nickelsdorf – Mosonmagyaróvár – Győr – Tata – Tatabanya – Budapest – Cegléd – Szolnok – Püspökladány – Oradea – Huedin – Cluj-Napoca – Turda – Târgu Mureş – Sighișoara – Hoghiz – Braşov – Săcele – Sinaia – Câmpina – Ploieşti – Bucharest – Urziceni – Slobozia – Hârşova – Constanţa – Agigea ... Poti – Senaki – Samtredia – Kutaisi – Khashuri – Gori – Tbilisi – Rustavi – Səmkir – Ganja – Yevlakh – Baku ... Türkmenbaşy – Balkanabat – Bereket – Serdar – Ashgabat – Tejen – Mary – Bayramaly– Türkmenabat – Alat – Bukhara – Karshi – G‘uzor – Sherobod – Termez – Denau – Dushanbe – Jirgatal – Sary Tash – Irkeshtam – China
- – 750 km (470 mi): Şanlıurfa – Diyarbakır – Bitlis – Doğubayazıt – Iğdır – Dilucu – Sadarak
- – 481 km (299 mi): Alyat – Saatly Rayon – Megri – Ordubad – Julfa – Nakhchivan – Sadarak
- – 2,630 km (1,630 mi): Moscow – Domodevo – Stupino – Mikhaylov – Michurinsk – Tambov – Borisoglebsk – Povorino – Mikhaylovka – Volgograd – Astrakhan – Liman – Kizlyar – Makhachkala – Derbent – Samur – Quba – Sumqayit– Baku– Alyat – Salyan – Masalli – Lankaran – Astara

=== Roads of local importance ===
Below R-level roads, roads of local importance connect M- and R-level roads to settlements. They are designated with Y for yerli (local). The road numbers are named in the format "Y-##-##", where # stands for a digit. The first two digits follow the same digits allocated to each district for license plates. The second pair of digits is assigned from 01 upwards in each district. Cities of republican significance do not have their individual codes, as there are no local roads, only republican, regional, and municipal.

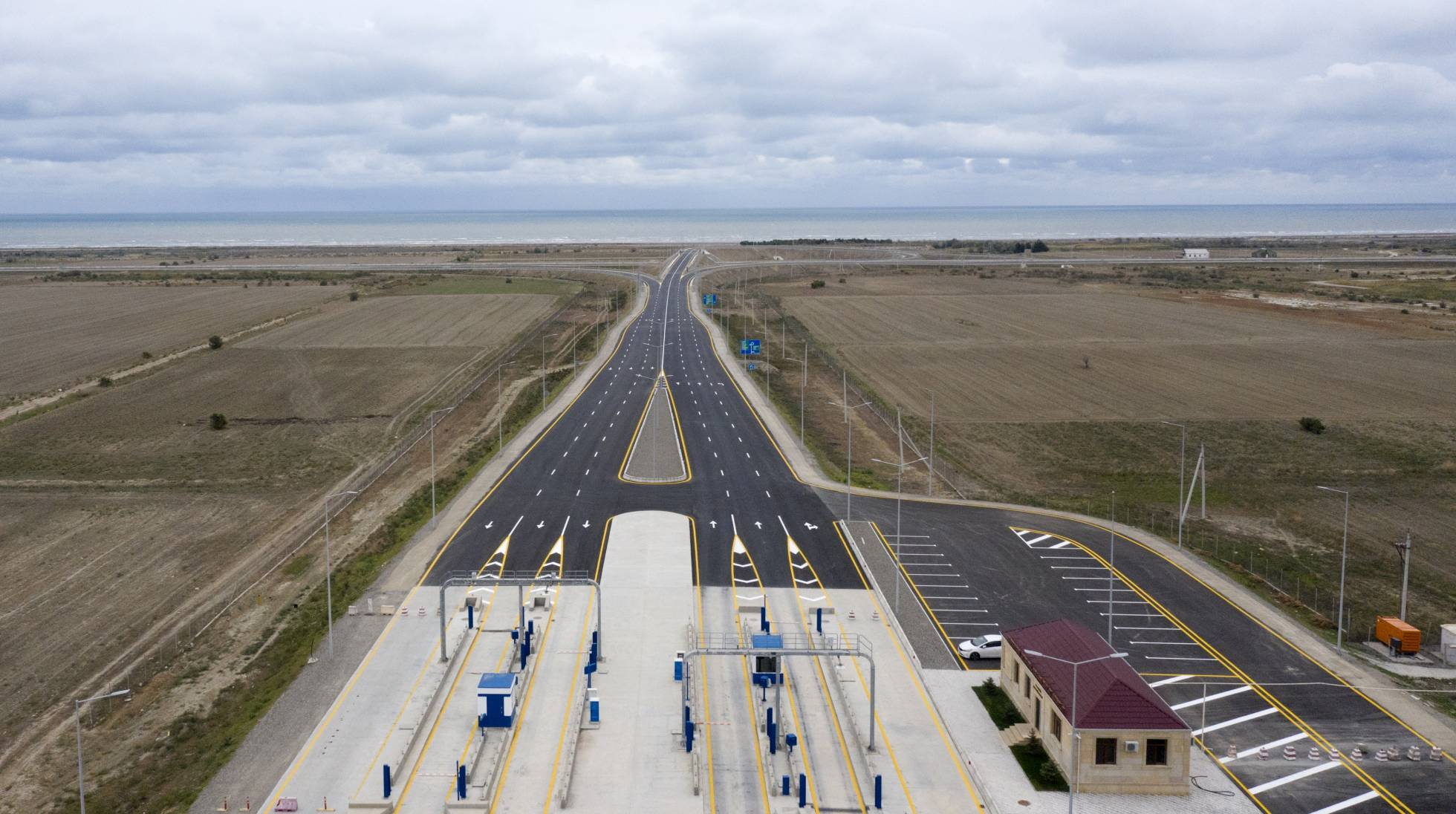

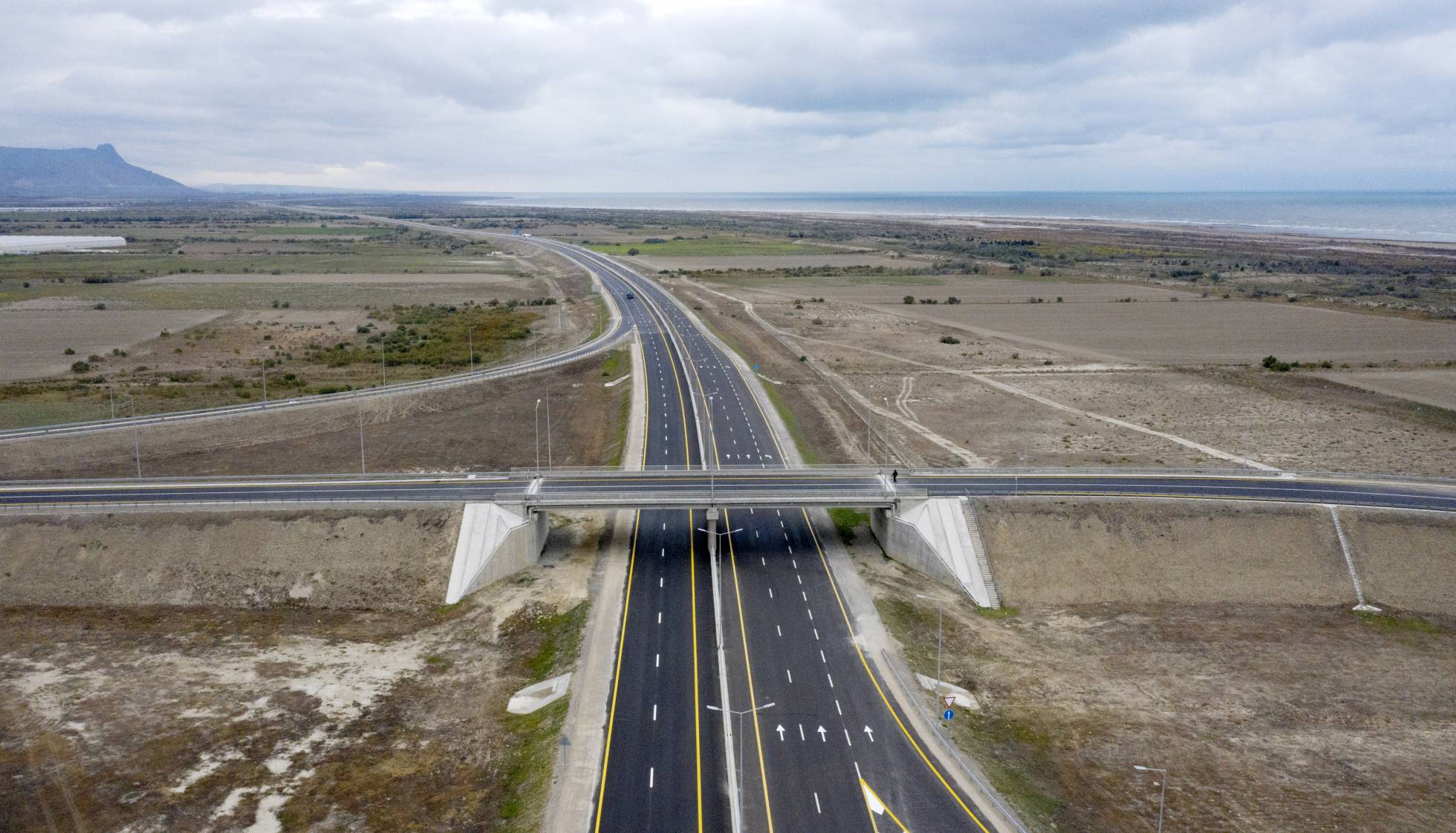

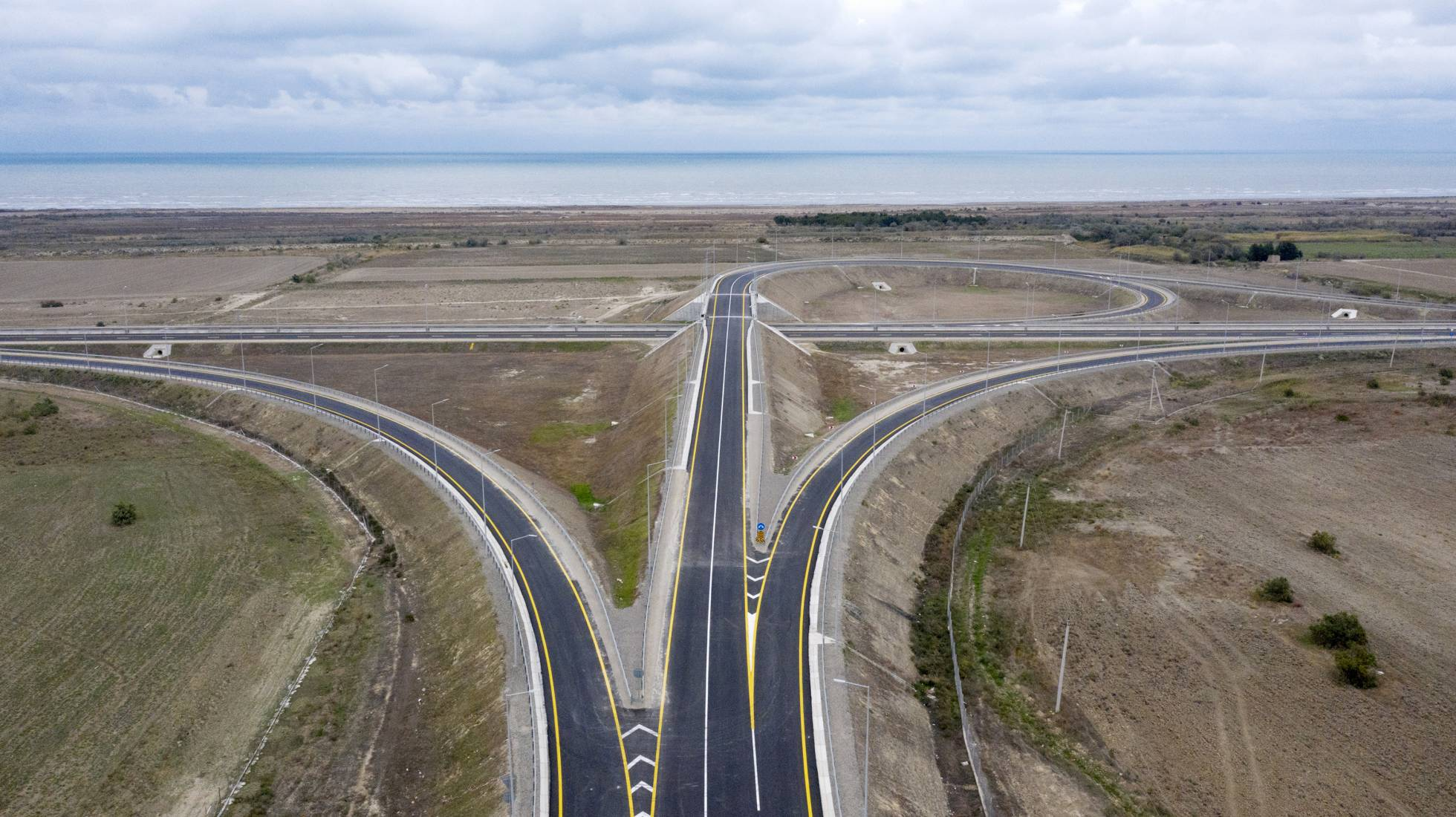

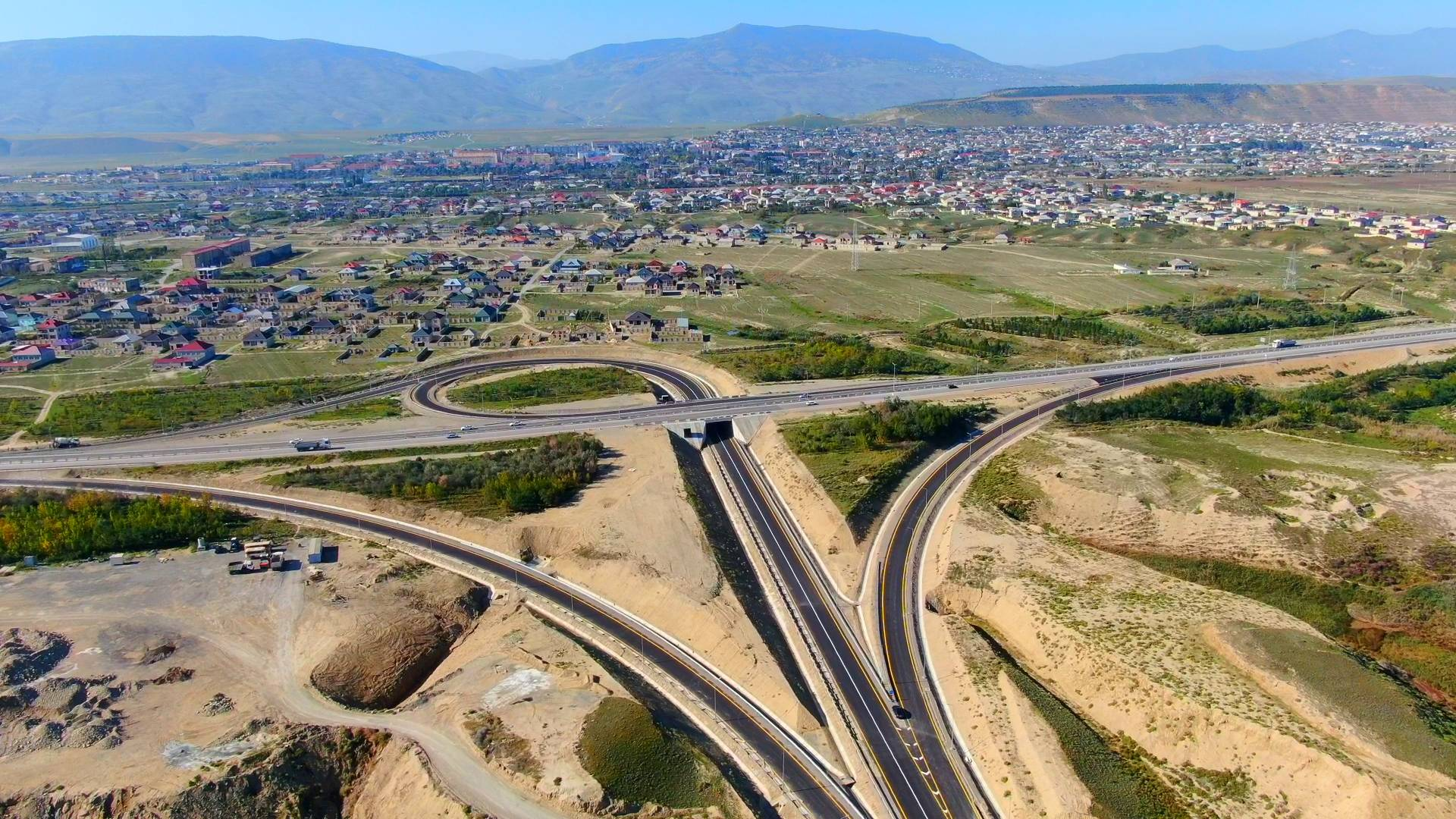

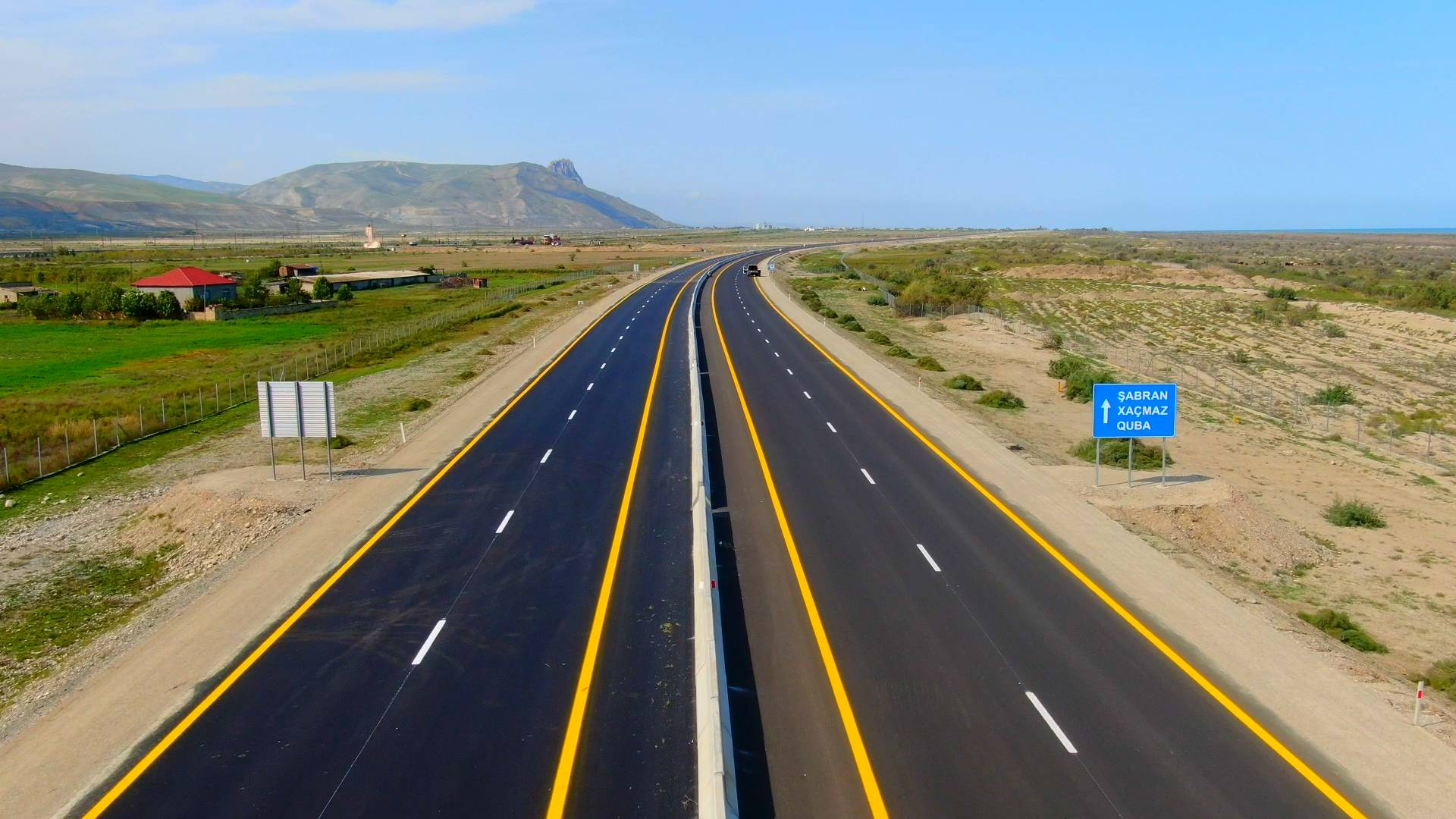

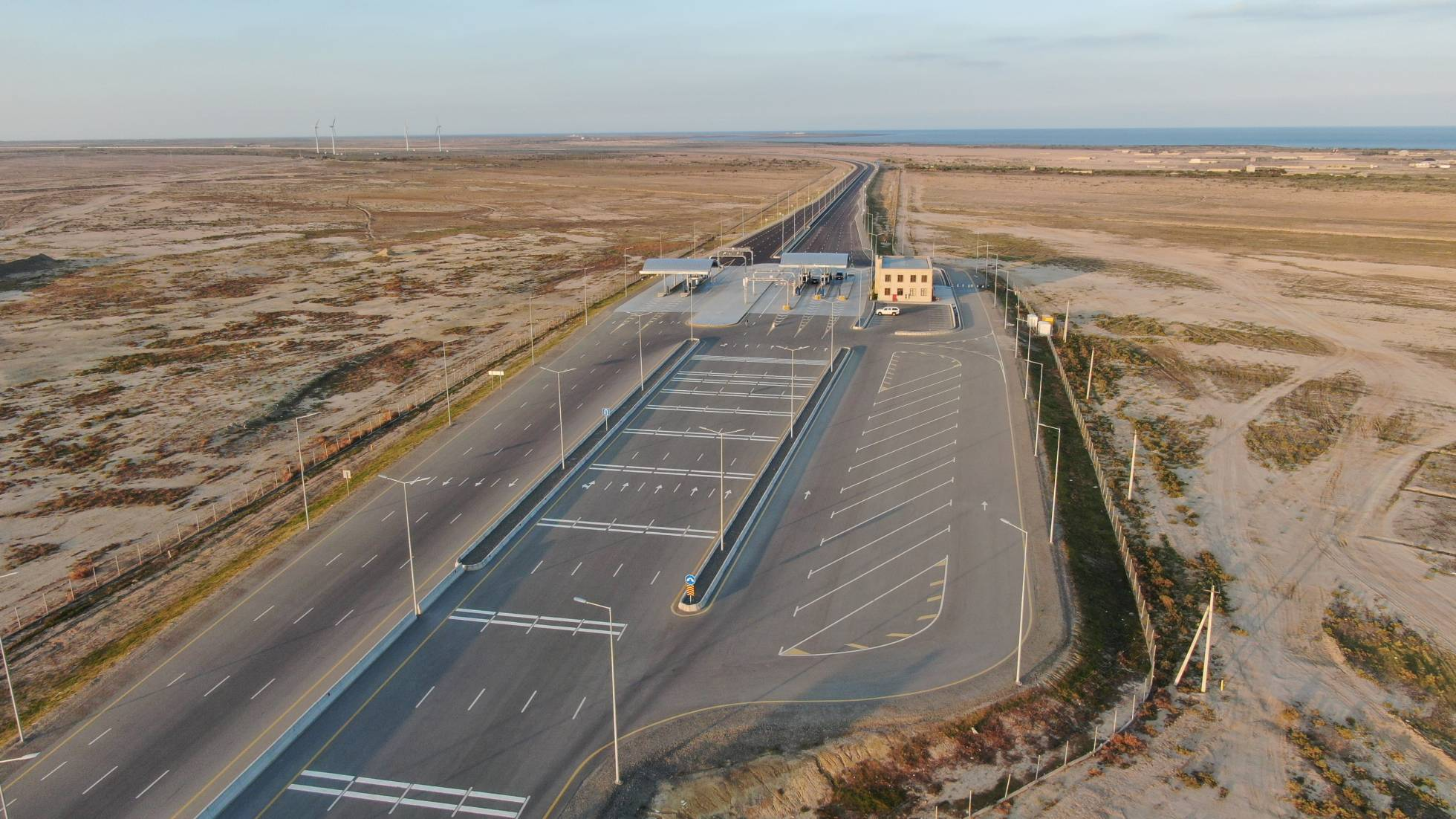

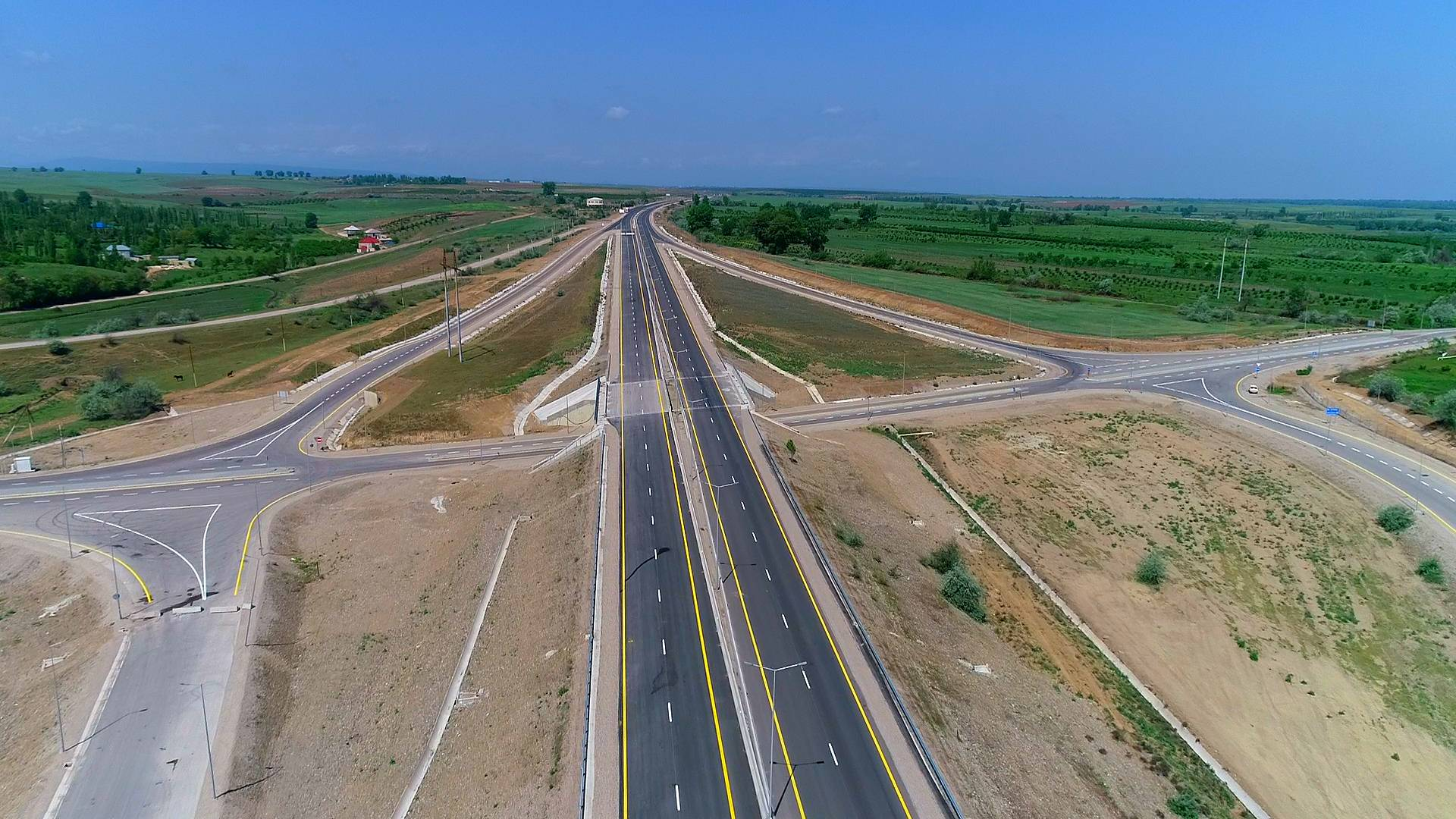

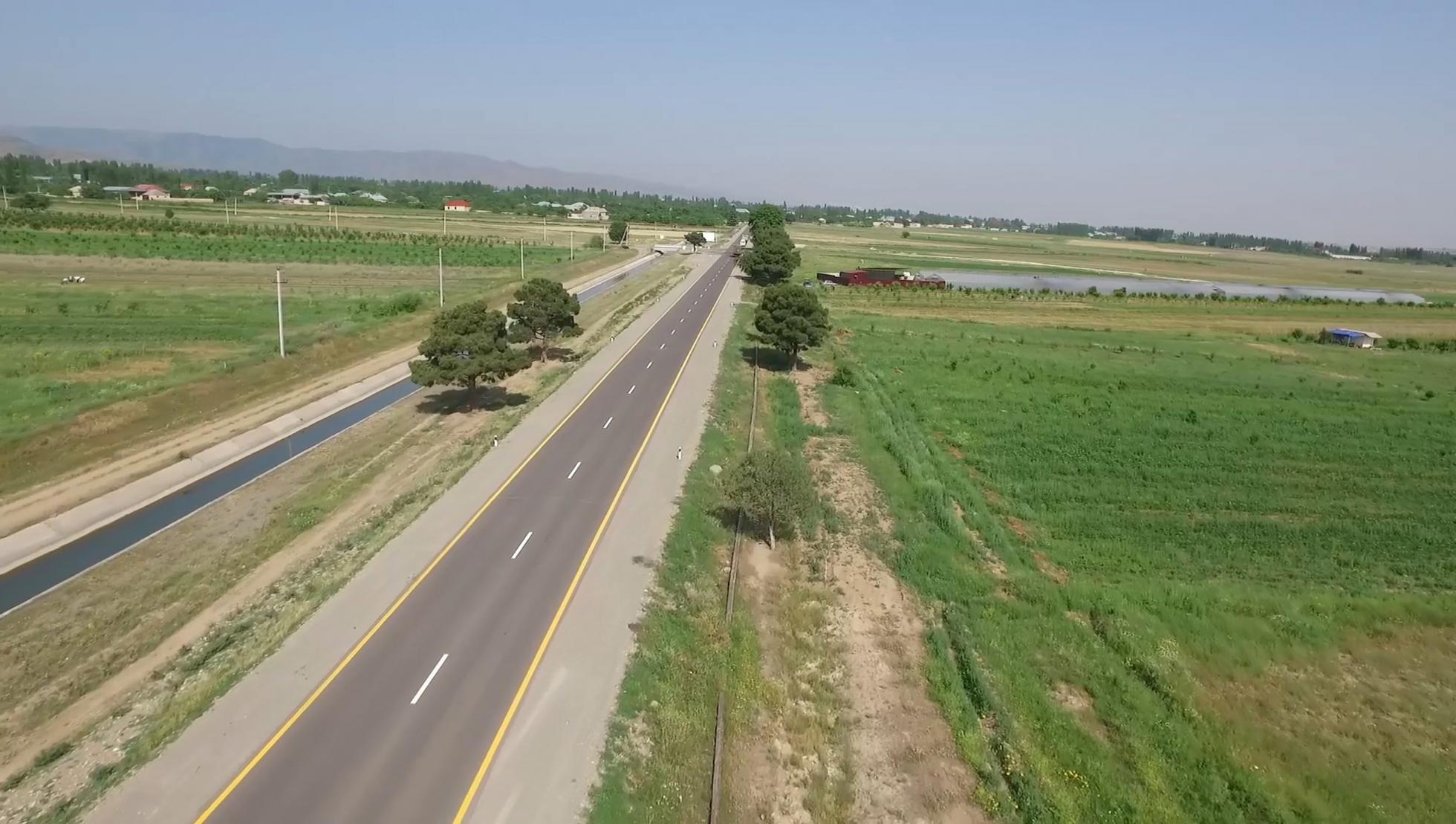

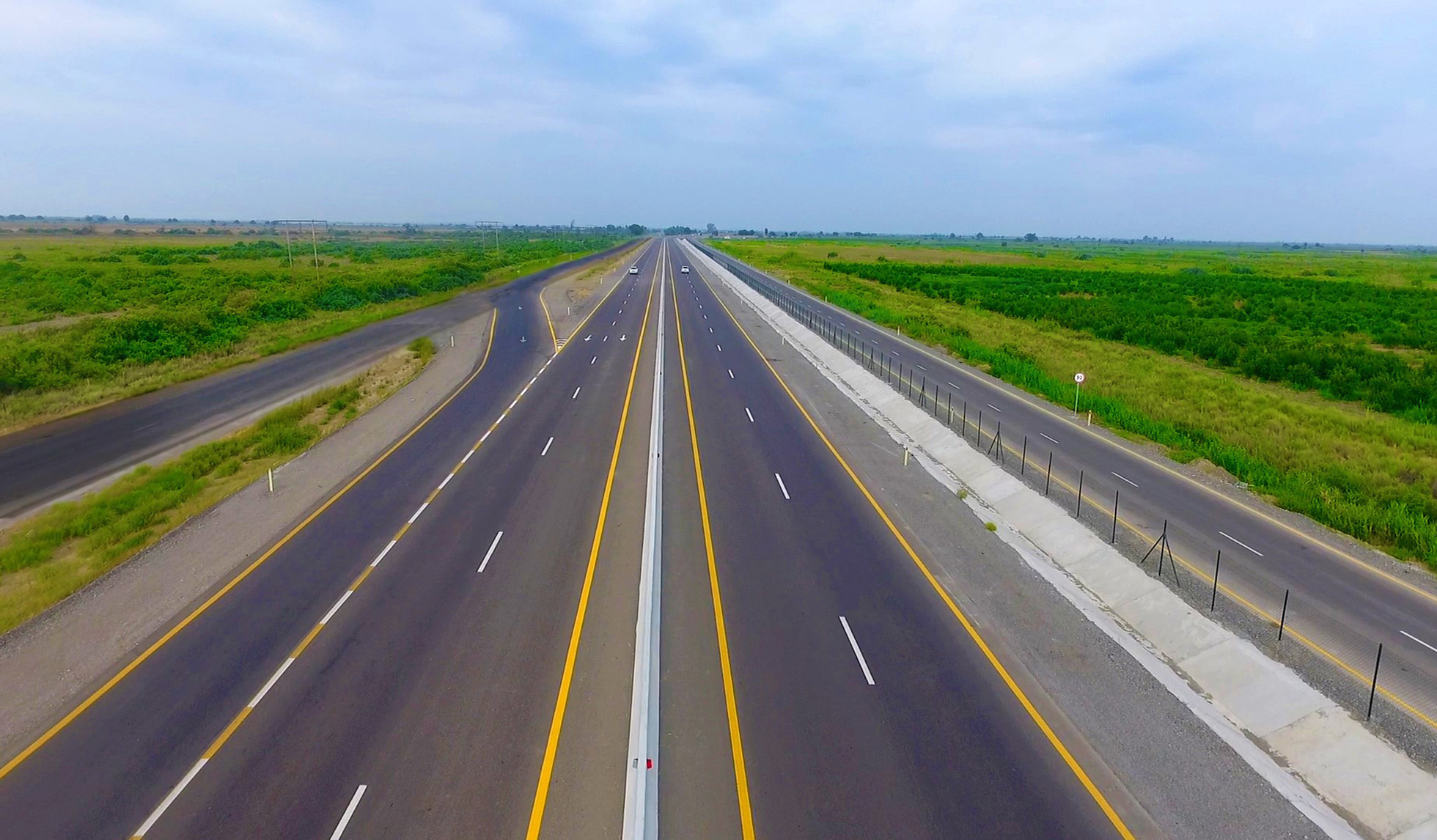

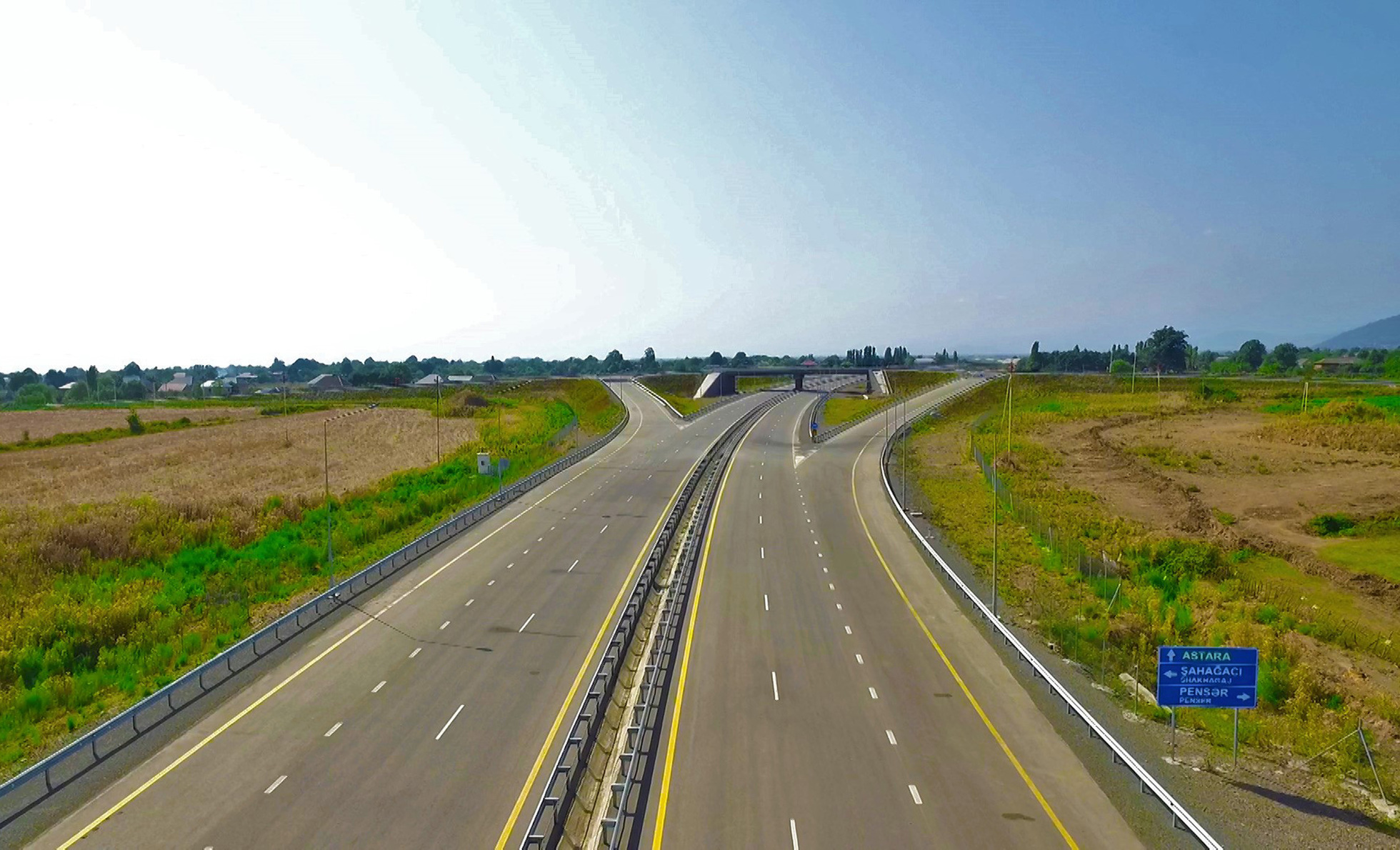

== See also ==
- Roads in Georgia (country)
- Roads in Kazakhstan
- Roads in Kyrgyzstan
- Roads in Tajikistan
