= Azerbaijan–Turkey border =

International border

Azerbaijan–Turkey border Azərbaycan–Türkiyə sərhədi Azerbaycan–Türkiye sınırı
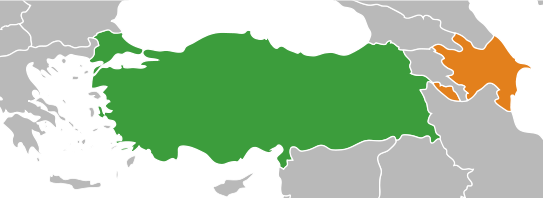

Characteristics
- Entities: Azerbaijan Turkey
- Length: 17 km (11 mi)

History
- Established: 16 March 1921; Signing of the Treaty of Moscow at the end of the Turkish-Armenian War
- Current shape: 18 October 1991; Independence of Azerbaijan from the Soviet Union
- Treaties: Treaty of Moscow, Treaty of Kars

The Azerbaijan–Turkey border (Azerbaijani: Azərbaycan–Türkiyə sərhədi, Turkish: Azerbaycan–Türkiye sınırı) is a 17 km (11 mi) long international border between the Republic of Azerbaijan and the Republic of Turkey. The border is located at the southeastern tip of the Iğdır Province on the Turkish side and at the northwestern tip of the Nakhchivan Autonomous Republic on the Azerbaijani side; running entirely along the Aras river, it is the shortest border for both countries. Should Turkey, candidate for EU membership, accede to the EU, Nakhchivan Autonomous Republic, which is part of Azerbaijan, will be a border neighbor with the European Union.

== Geography ==
The Aras river marks the border for its entire length. The land in the immediate vicinity is flat and undeveloped, with the exception of a four-lane highway and two customs checkpoints. The nearest town is Sədərək, located approximately 7 km (4.3 mi) east on the Azerbaijani side, while the nearest villages on the Turkish side are Emince and Gödekli in Aralık District, located approximately 23 km (14 mi) northwest.

== History ==
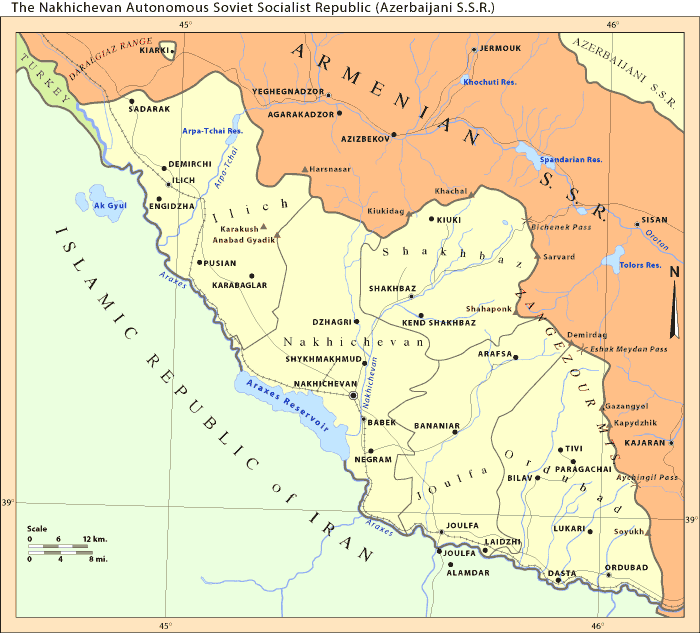
Map of Nakhchivan, with Turkey to the north-west

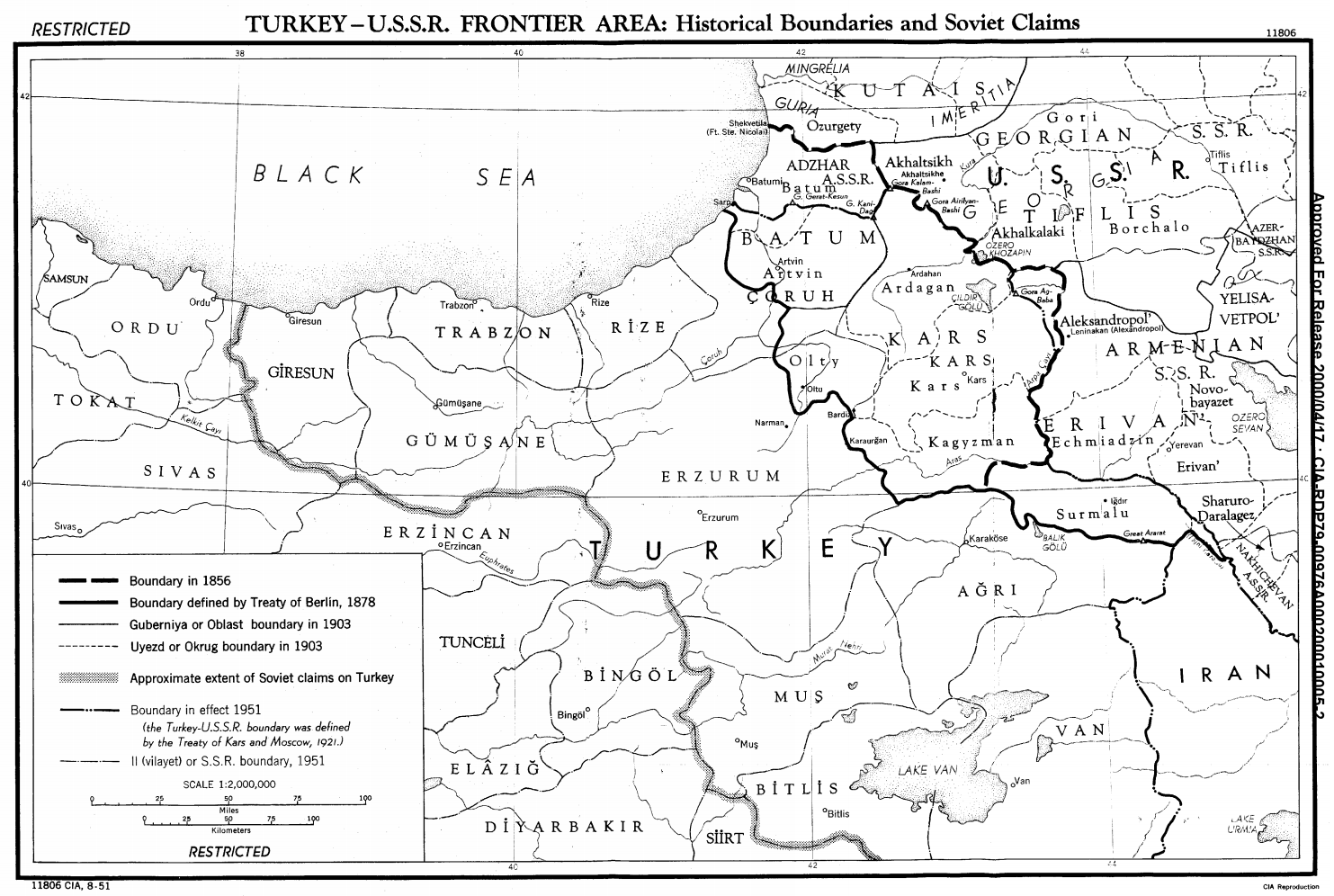
Map of the shifting border between Russia and the Ottoman Empire in the 19th century

During the 19th century the Caucasus region was contested between the declining Ottoman Empire, Persia and Russia, which was expanding southwards. Russia had conquered most of Persia's Caucasian lands by 1828 and then turned its attention to the Ottoman Empire. With the 1829 Treaty of Adrianople (ending the Russo-Turkish War of 1828–29), by which Russia gained most of modern Georgia, the Ottomans recognised Russian suzerainty over Eastern Armenia.

By the Treaty of San Stefano, ending the Russo-Turkish War (1877–1878), Russia gained considerable land in what is now eastern Turkey (termed Western Armenia), extending the Ottoman-Russian frontier south-westwards. Russia's gains of Batumi, Kars and Ardahan were confirmed by the Treaty of Berlin (1878), though it was compelled to hand back part of the area around Bayazid (modern Doğubayazıt) and the Eleşkirt valley.

During the First World War Russia invaded the eastern areas of the Ottoman Empire. In the chaos following the 1917 Russian Revolution the new Communist government hastily sought to end its involvement in the war and signed the Treaty of Brest-Litovsk in 1918 with Germany and the Ottoman Empire. By this treaty, Russia handed back the areas gained by the earlier Treaties of San Stefano and Berlin.

Seeking to gain independence from both empires, the peoples of the southern Caucasus had declared the Transcaucasian Democratic Federative Republic in 1918 and started peace talks with the Ottomans. Internal disagreements led to Georgia leaving the federation in May 1918, followed shortly thereafter by Armenia and Azerbaijan. With the Ottomans having invaded the Caucasus and quickly gained ground, the three new republics were compelled to sign the Treaty of Batum on 4 June 1918, by which they recognised the pre-1878 border.

With the Ottoman Empire defeated in Europe and Arabia, the Allied powers planned to partition it via the 1920 Treaty of Sèvres. Turkish nationalists were outraged at the treaty, contributing to the outbreak the Turkish War of Independence; the Turkish success in this conflict rendered Sèvres obsolete. Ottoman gains in Armenia were consolidated by the Treaty of Aleksandropol (1920).

Armenia and Azerbaijan had fought for control of Nakhchivan, with Azerbaijan backing the pro-Azeri Republic of Aras. The dispute was rendered moot when, in 1920, Russia's Red Army invaded Azerbaijan and Armenia, ending the independence of both. To avoid an all-out Russo-Turkish war the two nations signed the Treaty of Moscow in March 1921, which created a modified Soviet-Turkish border, granting Turkey a short strip of land connecting it to Nakhchivan. Nakhchivan itself was confirmed as an autonomous region of Soviet Azerbaijan in 1924. The treaty's provisions were later confirmed by the Treaty of Kars of October 1921, finalising what is now the Azerbaijan-Turkey border at its current position The border was then demarcated on the ground in March 1925 – July 1926 by a joint Soviet-Turkish commission. Turkey's independence had been recognised by the 1923 Treaty of Lausanne.

Azerbaijan was initially incorporated along with Armenia and Georgia in the Transcaucasian SFSR within the USSR, before being split off as the Azerbaijan Soviet Socialist Republic in 1936. The Kars Treaty border remained, despite occasional Soviet protests that it should be amended, notably in 1945. Turkey, backed by the US, refused to discuss the matter, and the Soviets, seeking better relations with their southern neighbour, dropped the issue.

Following Azerbaijan's declaration of independence from the USSR on 18 October 1991, Azerbaijan gained independence and inherited its section of the Turkey-USSR border.

== Border crossings ==
There is only one crossing of the border. The Umut Bridge carries the D.080/M7 highways across the Aras river. Plans for a railway into Nakhchivan from Turkey have been presented by the Turkish government since 2011, but no action was taken.

(Turkey) Turkish checkpoint	Province	(Azerbaijan) Azerbaijani checkpoint	Province	Opened	Route in Turkey	Route in Azerbaijan	Status
Dilucu	Iğdır	Sədərək	Nakhchivan	20 May 1992	E99 / D.080	E002 / M 7	Open
Dilucu	Iğdır	Sədərək	Nakhchivan	Opening in 2030	to Kars	to Baku	Under Construction (Passenger/Cargo)

== See also ==
- Dilucu Border Checkpoint
- Azerbaijan-Turkey relations
- Sadarak District
- M7 highway (Azerbaijan)
- State road D.080 (Turkey)
- Umut Bridge
- Dilucu
- Baku–Tbilisi–Kars railway
- Zangezur corridor
