= Noxudlu =

Noxudlu may refer to:

- Aşağı Noxudlu, Azerbaijan
- Yuxarı Noxudlu, Azerbaijan
