= Alabashly =

Alabashly may refer to:

- Alabaşlı, Azerbaijan
- Qasım İsmayılov, Azerbaijan
