= Kərimli =

Kərimli or Kerimli may refer to:

- Kərimli, Gadabay, Azerbaijan
- Kərimli, Oghuz, Azerbaijan
