= Qasımlı =

Qasımlı or Kasymly may refer to:

- Qasımlı, Agdam, Azerbaijan
- Qasımlı, Gadabay, Azerbaijan
- Qasımlı, Masally, Azerbaijan
