= İnəkboğan =

- Municipality
- Location within Azerbaijan
- Coordinates: 40°33′34″N 45°36′59″E
- Country: Azerbaijan
- Rayon: Gadabay

Population
  - Total: 2,901
- Time zone: UTC+4 (AZT)
  - Summer (DST): UTC+5 (AZT)

İnəkboğan (also, Inekbogan) is a village and municipality in the Gadabay Rayon of Azerbaijan. It has a population of 2,901. The municipality consists of the villages of İnəkboğan, Qasımlı, Köhnəqışlaq, and Kərimli.
