= European route E002 =

Road in trans-European E-road network

E002

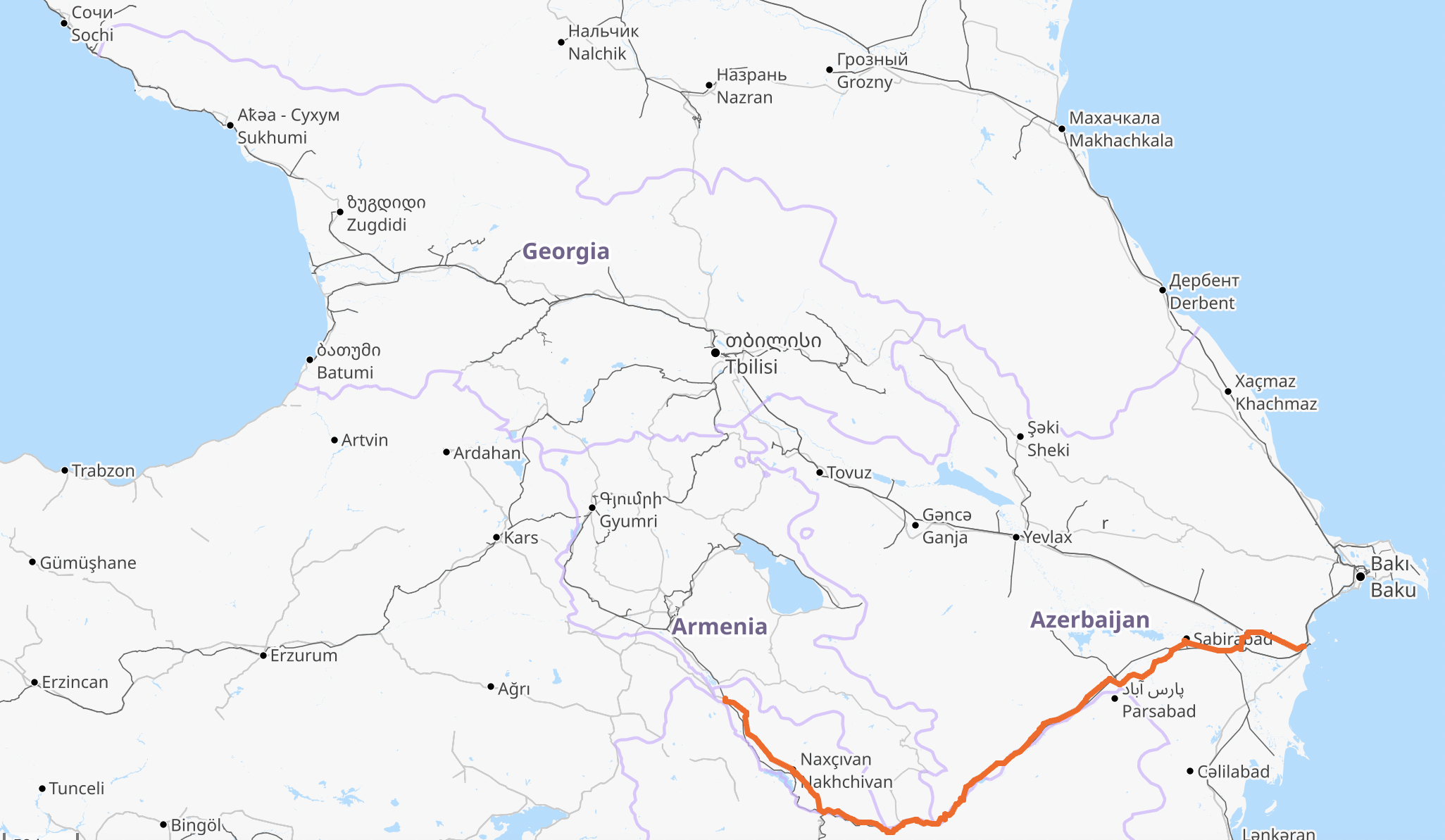

Route information
- Length: 540 km (340 mi)

Major junctions
- From: Ələt, Azerbaijan
- To: Sədərək, Nakhchivan, Azerbaijan

Location
- Countries: Azerbaijan; Armenia

Highway system
- International E-road network; A Class; B Class

E 002 is a European B class road in Azerbaijan and Armenia, connecting the cities Alyat - Saatly Rayon - Megri - Ordubad - Julfa - Nakhchivan – Sadarak

== Route ==
- Azerbaijan
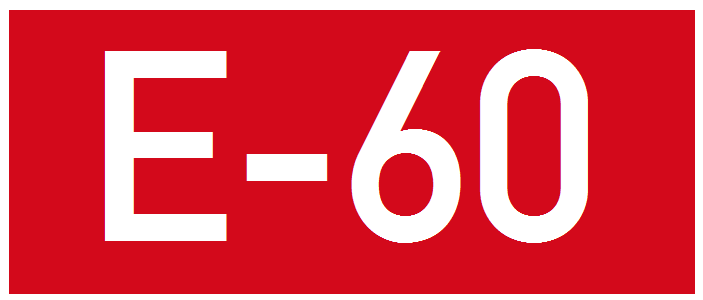
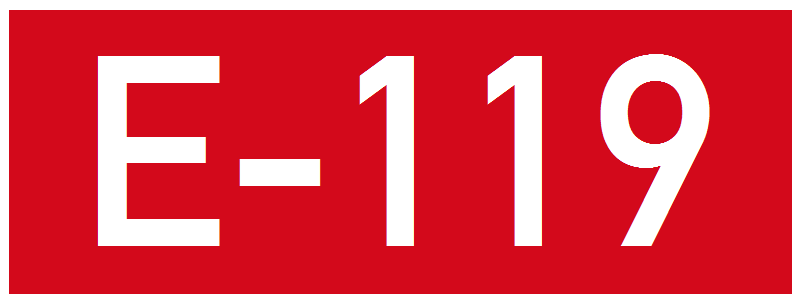
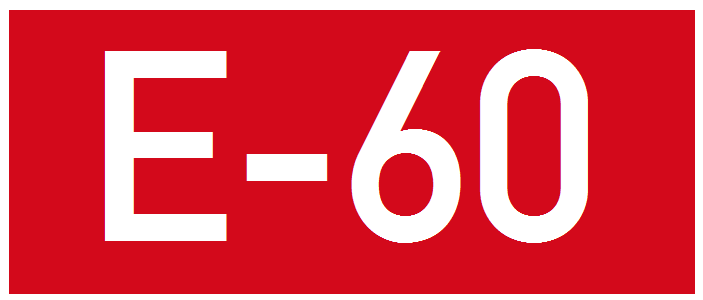
  - M 2: Ələt ( E60 E119) - Shirvan ( E60)
  - M 6: Shirvan - Saatli - Hozali - Mərcanlı - Mincivan - Aghband
- Armenia
  - Հ49: Aghband - Nrnadzor ( E117)
  - Մ17: Nrnadzor - Meghri
  - Մ2: Meghri ( E117) - Agarak ( E117 (Iran) Road 12)
- Azerbaijan
  - M 8: Kilit - Ordubad - Julfa ( (Iran) Road 21) - Nakhchivan
  - M 7: Nakhchivan - Sədərək
    ( (Turkey) State road D.080)
  - R 63: Sədərək
- Armenia
  - Մ2: Yeraskh ( E117)

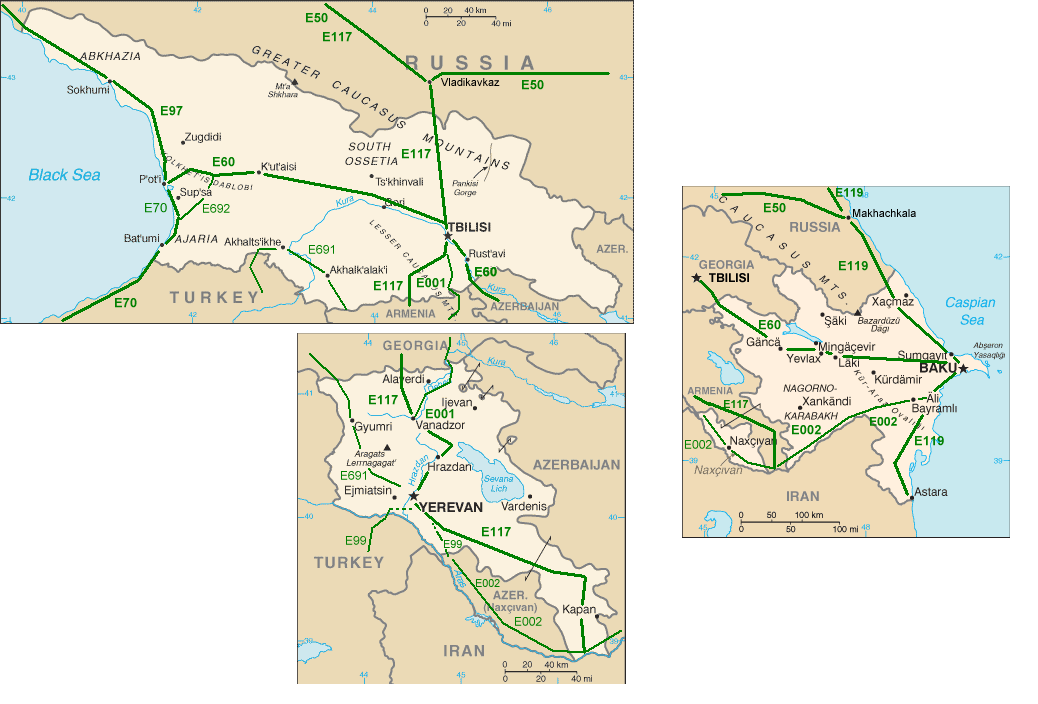
E-roads-Caucasus-countries.
