= Kasum-Ismailov =

Kasum-Ismailov may refer to:

- Goranboy (city), Azerbaijan
- Qasım İsmayılov, Azerbaijan
