= Umut Bridge =

Border crossing bridge between Iğdır, Turkey and Nakhcivan, Azerbaijan

Umut Bridge Umut Köprüsü Ümid Körpüsü
- Coordinates: 39°39′19″N 44°48′12″E
- Carries: 2 lanes of D.080 and M-7
- Crosses: Aras river
- Locale: Dilucu, Iğdır, Turkey and Sederek, Nakhchivan
- Official name: Turkish: Umut Köprüsü; Azerbaijani: Ümid Körpüsü
- Maintained by: General Directorate of Highways
- Preceded by: Boraltan Bridge

Characteristics
- Total length: 286 m (938 ft)

History
- Construction start: 1991
- Opened: 22 May 1992

Statistics
- Daily traffic: 2,560

Location
- Interactive map of Umut Bridge

Umut Bridge (Turkish: Umut Köprüsü, Azerbaijani: Ümid Körpüsü, transl. Hope Bridge), historically known as the Boraltan Bridge, is a 286-metre-long (938 ft) deck-arch bridge crossing the Aras river on the Azerbaijan–Turkey border. The current bridge was constructed between 1991 and 1992 and formally opened on 25 May 1992, along with the Dilucu customs checkpoint.

The original bridge was historically known for an incident in 1945 between the Soviet Union and Turkey, known as the Boraltan Bridge massacre (Turkish: Boraltan Köprüsü faciası). The incident saw the return of 195 Soviet soldiers, convicted of fighting for Germany during World War II, back into the Soviet Union by the Turkish government. However, it was because of escaping Stalinist persecution that 146 Azerbaijanis had sought refuge at the Boraltan border posts located in Turkey in 1944. Due to rising tensions between the USSR and Turkey, the convicted soldiers were handed over in order to prevent any further escalation of tensions. Shortly after the soldiers crossed the border, they were summarily executed under charges of treason.

Turkey has stated its intention to construct a railway bridge at more-or-less the same location as part of a plan to link Kars to Nakhchivan via Iğdır (part of the case of which being that it would constitute an extension to the Baku-Tbilisi-Akhalkalaki-Kars railway in order to provide a Baku-Nakhchivan rail route that completely circumnavigates Armenia), however the expected rehabilitation of the Zangezur corridor railway (Horadiz-Ağbənd-Ordubad) following the Second Karabakh War would appear to undermine rather than support the case for this.

== See also ==
- Azerbaijan–Turkey border
- Dilucu Border Checkpoint
- Aralık
- Sadarak District
