= Kazian =

Kazian may refer to:

- Kazian, Azerbaijan
- Kazian, Iran
