= Zaraqan =

Zaraqan may refer to:

- Zarağan, Azerbaijan
- Zarqan, Razavi Khorasan, Iran
