= M7 highway (Azerbaijan) =

Highway in Azerbaijan

M7 highway
- M 7 şossesi

Route information
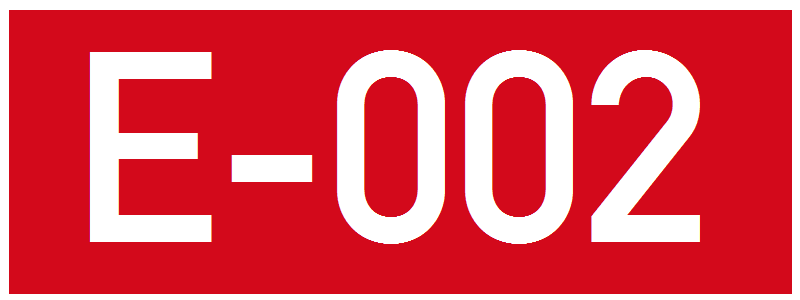
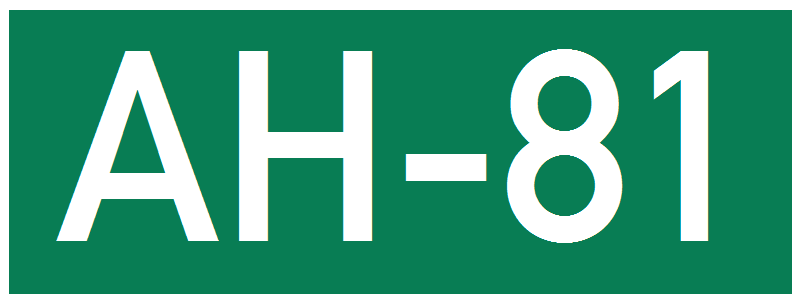
- Part of E002 / AH81
- Length: 89 km (55 mi)

Major junctions
- West end: D.080 at the Turkish border near Sədərək, Nakhchivan

- R 63 near Sədərək; R 62 in Cəlilkənd

- East end: M 8 / R 49 in Nakhchivan

Location
- Country: Azerbaijan
- Municipalities: Nakhchivan, Babək, Kəngərli, Şərur, Sədərək

Highway system
- Roads in Azerbaijan

The M7 is a 89 km (55 mi) long highway in Nakhchivan. The route runs northwest from the city of Nakhchivan to the border with Turkey in the northwestern end of the exclave. The route is one of three open border crossings in Nakhchivan and the only crossing with Turkey. The entire route is an undivided, four-lane highway, except for a short two-lane section crossing the Umut Bridge into Turkey.

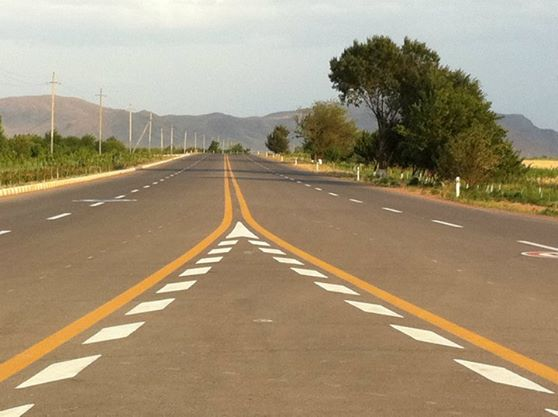
M7 Highway

== Importance ==
Nakhchivan Autonomous Republic has Azerbaijan's only land border with Türkiye, measuring 17.7 km, and acts as one of the gateways from Türkiye to South Caucasus and to Central Asia in terms of commerce and logistics.

Turkey has stated its intention to construct a railway bridge at more-or-less the same location as part of a plan to link Kars to Nakhchivan via Iğdır.

This route plays a crucial role in the future to increase regional connectivity - not only throughout Caucasia, but also across greater Eurasia, joining Turkish, Azerbaijani, Russian, Central Asian, Iranian and Armenian territories and linking Europe to Asia (E80 - AH5).

== See also ==
- Roads in Azerbaijan
