= Köhnəqışlaq =

Köhnəqışlaq or Këgnakyshlak may refer to:

- Köhnəqışlaq, Agstafa, Azerbaijan
- Köhnəqışlaq, Gadabay, Azerbaijan
