= M8 highway =

M8 highway may refer to:

- M8 highway (Russia)
- M8 highway (Azerbaijan)
