= Heydarabad, Azerbaijan =

Heydarabad Heydərabad
- Municipality
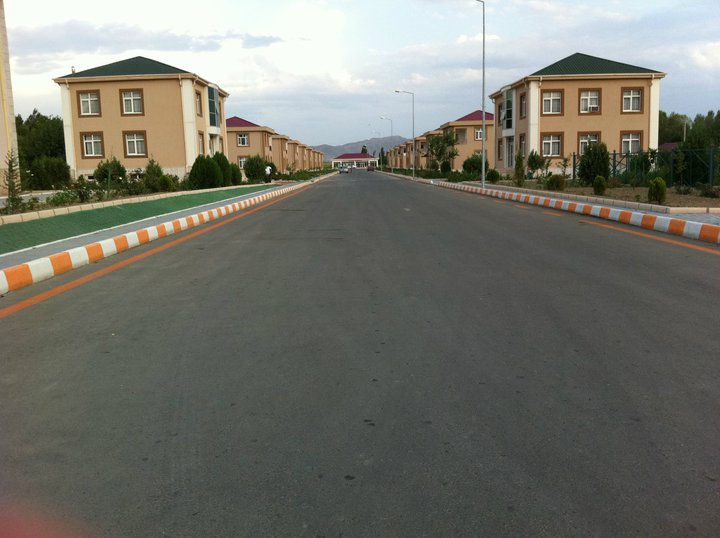
- Interactive map of Heydarabad
- Location within Azerbaijan
- Coordinates: 39°43′13″N 44°51′11″E
- Country: Azerbaijan
- Autonomous republic: Nakhchivan
- District: Sadarak
- Elevation: 817 m (2,680 ft)

Population (2013)
  - Total: 2,000
- Time zone: UTC+4 (AZT)

Heydarabad (Azerbaijani: Heydərabad) is a settlement and the capital of the Sadarak District of the Nakhchivan Autonomous Republic of Azerbaijan. It borders Armenia and before the First Nagorno-Karabakh War had road and rail connections with the Armenian village of Yeraskh on the other side of the border. It has a population of 2,000 as of 2013. It is the westernmost settlement of Azerbaijan.

== History ==
The settlement was founded in the 1970s on the initiative of the President of Azerbaijan, Heydar Aliyev. By the decree of the Supreme Assembly of Nakhchivan AR dated on March 23, 2000, it was separated from Sədərək and turned to the settlement as an independent administrative unit. Because of the location on the border, it was subjected to fighting several times. It was destroyed by artillery projectiles in 1992. Its residents were displaced and took refuge in Sadarak village and other parts of Nakhchivan.

Restoration started from 1997-98 with new office buildings, public facilities, and shopping centers being built. Seventy-five residential buildings that had been destroyed during the war were renovated and restored ahead of the 75th birthday of Heydar Aliyev. At the initiative of the local population, the settlement was named 'Heydarabad. Utilities were also installed, including power lines, a 35/10 kV substation and a water pump station to direct the underground water-supply of Bulaqbaşı to the settlement. There are a wine factory, secondary school, kindergarten, and a hospital in the settlement.
