= Aralık District =

District of Iğdır Province, Turkey

- District
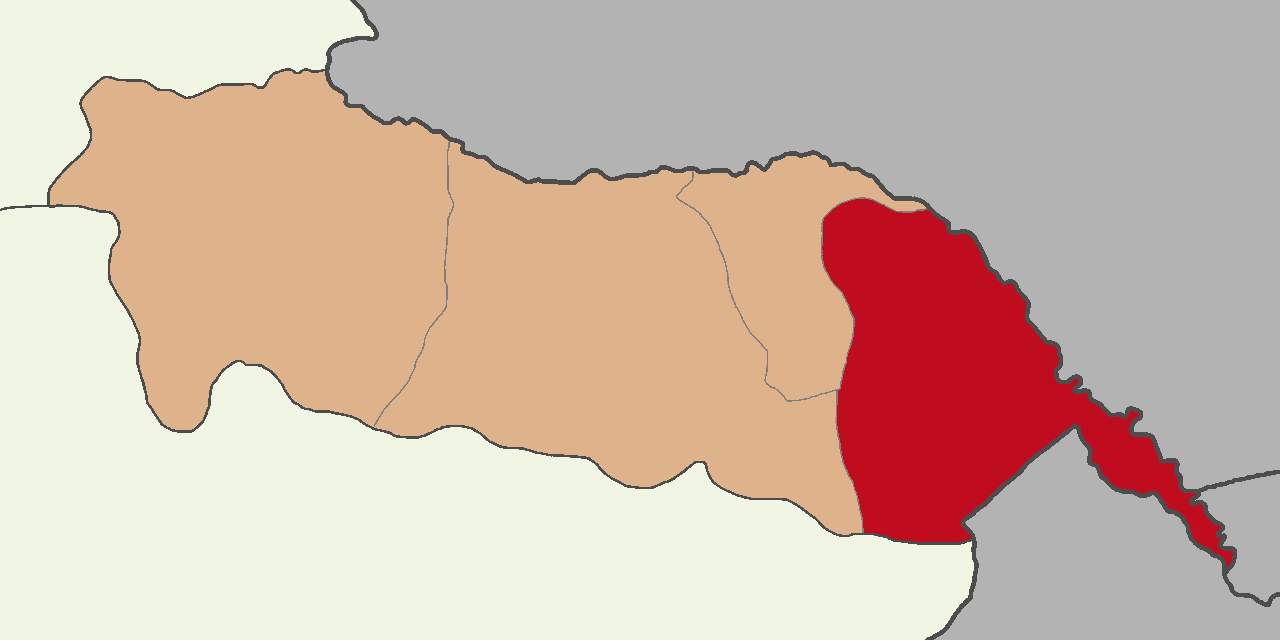
- Map showing Aralık District in Iğdır Province

- Location in Turkey
- Coordinates: 39°52′N 44°31′E
- Country: Turkey
- Province: Iğdır
- Seat: Aralık

Government
  - Kaymakam: Fatih Özcan
- Area: 852 km^{2} (329 sq mi)
- Population (2022): 20,133
  - Density: 24/km^{2} (61/sq mi)
- Time zone: UTC+3 (TRT)
- Website: www.aralik.gov.tr

Aralık District is a district of the Iğdır Province of Turkey. Its seat is the town of Aralık. Its area is 852 km^{2}, and its population is 20,133 (2022). Part of the district forms the international border between Turkey and Armenia, which has been closed since 1993, and the border between Turkey and Iran.

== Aras corridor ==
The district of Aralık includes the Aras corridor, which connects Turkey with Azerbaijan through the Nakhchivan exclave. The corridor is formed by the confluence of the Aras and Lower Karasu rivers and was ceded to Turkey by the Soviet Union in the Treaty of Kars. It is predominantly inhabited by Kurds and is the location of the Dilucu Border Gate, the only border crossing between Turkey and Azerbaijan, opened in May 1992.

== Composition ==
There is one municipality in Aralık District:

- Aralık

There are 22 villages in Aralık District:

- Adetli
- Aşağıaratan
- Aşağıçamurlu
- Aşağıçiftlikköy
- Aşağıtopraklı
- Babacan
- Emince
- Gödekli
- Hacıağa
- Hasanhan
- Karahacılı
- Kıraçbağı
- Kulukent
- Ramazankent
- Saraçlı
- Tarlabaşı
- Tazeköy
- Yenidoğan
- Yukarıaratan
- Yukarıçamurlu
- Yukarıçiftlikköy
- Yukarıtopraklı
