= M8 highway (Azerbaijan) =

Highway in Azerbaijan

M8 highway
- M 8 şossesi

Route information
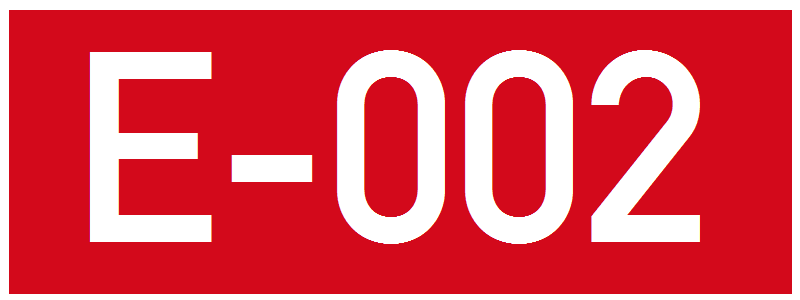
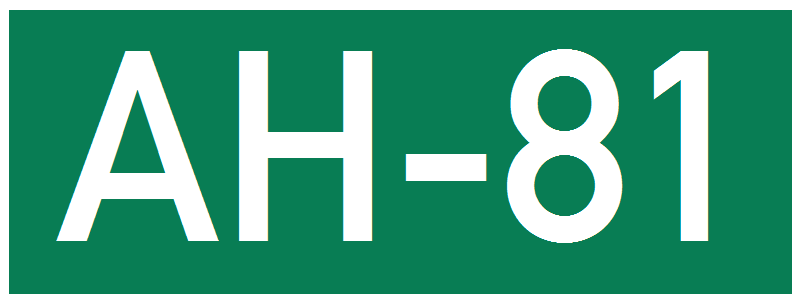
- Part of E002 / AH81
- Length: 89 km (55 mi)

Major junctions
- West end: M 7 in Nakhchivan
- R 64 in Şəkərabad; R 65 in Julfa; R 66 in Ordubad
- East end: Մ2

Location
- Country: Azerbaijan
- Municipalities: Nakhchivan, Babək, Kəngərli, Şərur

Highway system
- Roads in Azerbaijan

The M8 is a 100 km (62 mi) long highway in the Nakhchivan Autonomous Republic or Azerbaijan. It begins in the city of Nakhchivan and runs southeast to the closed border with Armenia. It is the primary highway in the southeast of the exclave. The road continues into Armenia as the E002 for 6.5 km (4.0 mi) until connecting to the M2 highway near Agarak.
