= Dilucu Border Checkpoint =

The station is located in Iğdır Province.

Dilucu Border Checkpoint is a checkpoint located in the Nakhchivan Autonomous Republic of the Republic of Azerbaijan, established on the Azerbaijan-Turkey border. The other side of the crossing is the Aralık district of the Iğdır province of the Republic of Turkey.

Although the Dilucu Border Checkpoint is one of the three crossing points in Iğdır Province, it is currently the only operating checkpoint. It is also the only border crossing point between Turkey and Azerbaijan.

The checkpoint operates 24 hours a day. Through the Sadarak – Dilucu border crossing, trade relations are established with more than 30 countries worldwide. With the help of this checkpoint, Turkey holds a key position in the foreign trade turnover of the Nakhchivan Autonomous Republic.

== About ==
=== Creation ===
The crossing point began operating after the Sadarak-Dilucu bridge, also called "Ümid," "Hasrat," or "Konul" bridge, over the Aras River, was opened on May 28, 1992. The checkpoint is located 38 km from the center of Aralık district and 85 km from the center of Iğdır province, covering an area of 36,857 m².

=== Activity ===
In 2015, the checkpoint underwent major repairs. After the renovation, the checkpoint has 6 entry and 3 exit lanes for pedestrians. For vehicles, there is a single combined entry-exit lane. During the opening ceremony after the renovation, Asaf Mammadov, head of the Customs Service of the Nakhchivan Autonomous Republic, stated that the Sadarak-Dilucu bridge was opened on May 28, 1992, and since then, the organization of customs procedures has positively impacted the economic situation of both Nakhchivan and Turkey’s eastern provinces, including Iğdır. On the Azerbaijani side, the corresponding checkpoint is the Sadarak border crossing. In addition to import-export, transit, and pedestrian entry-exit activities, since 2009, the Dilucu border crossing has also been granted permission for border trade.

Established by the governor's decision No. 92-3065 dated May 22, 1992, and beginning operations on the same date as a first-degree customs directorate, the Dilucu border crossing point—also known as the Dilucu Customs Directorate—currently operates under the Gürbulak Customs and Trade Regional Directorate. During the years 1992–1994, when crossings through the Dilucu border point were not subject to any restrictions, oil trade with Nakhchivan positively impacted the economic situation of both sides. Since 1994, to reduce the number of vehicles passing through the checkpoint, a system was introduced allowing vehicles with odd-numbered plates to cross on one day and those with even-numbered plates on the next.

On October 19, 2015, following major reconstruction works, an opening ceremony was held with the participation of First Deputy Chairman of the State Customs Committee of Azerbaijan, Lieutenant General of Customs Service Safar Mehdiyev; Turkey’s Minister of Customs and Trade, Cenap Aşçı; Chairman of the State Customs Committee of the Nakhchivan Autonomous Republic, Lieutenant General of Customs Service Asaf Mammadov; Chairman of the Union of Chambers and Commodity Exchanges of Turkey, Rifat Hisarcıklıoğlu; Governor of Iğdır, Davud Hanel; and other officials.

In the future, a railway line is planned to be constructed from Kars to the Dilucu crossing point, which will later connect with Nakhchivan following the construction of the seven-kilometer Dilucu -Sadarak railway section.

== Statistics ==
The indicators are as follows:

Total Number of Entries and Exits Through the Border Crossing (Turkish + Foreign Nationals):
Year	2007	2008	2009	2010	2011
Entry	327.722	336.858	282.732	426.766	478.569
Exit	323.140	336.912	275.265	413.837	456.045

Number of Buses Passing Through the Border Crossing:
Year	2008	2009
Count	15.017	10.241

== See also ==
- Azerbaijan–Turkey border
- Umut Bridge
- Aralık
- Sadarak District
