= Qasımlı, Gadabay =

Qasımlı
- Location within Azerbaijan
- Coordinates: 40°34′15″N 45°36′49″E
- Country: Azerbaijan
- Rayon: Gadabay
- Municipality: İnəkboğan
- Time zone: UTC+4 (AZT)
  - Summer (DST): UTC+5 (AZT)

Qasımlı (also, Kasymly) is a village in the Gadabay Rayon of Azerbaijan. The village forms part of the municipality of İnəkboğan. In the 19th century the village was called Hacıqasımlı after Hacı Qasım, a settler from Cobankara, now in Armenia.
