= Bəhramtəpə =

- Municipality
- Location within Azerbaijan
- Coordinates: 39°44′35″N 47°57′08″E
- Country: Azerbaijan
- District: Imishli

Population
  - Total: 7,442
- Time zone: UTC+4 (AZT)
  - Summer (DST): UTC+5 (AZT)

Bəhramtəpə (also, Bahramtepe, Agakhanly, Pervomayskoye, and Pervoye Maya; Russian: Бирмай; formerly Bir May) is a village and municipality in the Imishli District of Azerbaijan. It has a population of 7,442.

During the Soviet era, the village was known as Bir May (meaning May 1), in honour of the Soviet Labor Day. The village was renamed Bəhramtəpə in 1992.
