= Həkəri, Qubadli =

Həkəri
- Location within Azerbaijan
- Coordinates: 39°28′N 46°37′E
- Country: Azerbaijan
- District: Qubadli

Population (2008)
  - Total: 535
- Time zone: UTC+4 (AZT)
  - Summer (DST): UTC+5 (AZT)

Həkəri (Hakari) is a village in the Qubadli District of Azerbaijan

The village takes its name from the Hakari river. It was part of the larger Muradkhanli village council (municipality) during Soviet times. Moreover, most of what Qubadli is today was called Hakara according to the 18th-century Ottoman Tax Registry.
