= Köhnəqışlaq, Gadabay =

Human settlement in Azerbaijan

Köhnəqışlaq is a village in the municipality of İnəkboğan in the Gadabay Rayon of Azerbaijan.
