= Qasımlı, Agdam =

Qasımlı
- Location within Azerbaijan Location within Karabakh Economic Region
- Coordinates: 39°57′23″N 46°54′16″E
- Country: Azerbaijan
- Rayon: Agdam
- Time zone: UTC+4 (AZT)
  - Summer (DST): UTC+5 (AZT)

Qasımlı (Armenian: Ղագըմլը, Russian: Касымлы, also Ghasymly, Kasymly) is a ruined village in the Agdam Rayon of Azerbaijan. It was liberated in October 2020 having been under Armenian occupation for nearly 30 years. However, former residents visiting the ruins reported that there was so little left that they could only find their way around by the topography, such was the level of destruction.

== Notable natives ==
- Tamerlan Qarayev (b 30 Jan, 1952) — Ambassador of Azerbaijan to China (1993-2001), India (2004-2011), Indonesia (2011-2018) and Lithuania (2018-present).
