= State road D.080 (Turkey) =

D.080

Route information
- Length: 295 km (183 mi)

Major junctions
- West end: D.100 / E80 in Horasan, Erzurum, Turkey

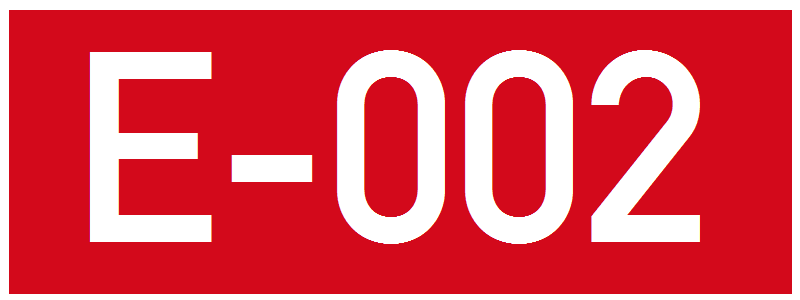
- East end: M 7 / E002 at the Azerbaijani border near Dilucu, Iğdır, Turkey

Location
- Country: Turkey

Highway system
- Highways in Turkey; Motorways; List; State Highways; List

D.080 is a 295 km (183 mi) long state highway running from Horasan, Erzurum Province to Turkey's border with Azerbaijan near Dilucu. The route connects to Azerbaijan, via the Nakhchivan Autonomous Republic, and is the only crossing between the two countries. The route is mostly a non-divided, four-lane highway.
