= Aşağı Noxudlu =

- Municipality
- Location within Azerbaijan
- Coordinates: 39°38′52″N 48°57′18″E
- Country: Azerbaijan
- Rayon: Salyan

Population
  - Total: 1,716
- Time zone: UTC+4 (AZT)
  - Summer (DST): UTC+5 (AZT)

Aşağı Noxudlu (also, Ashagy Nokhudlu, Nizhmye Nokhudly, and Nizhniye Nokhudly) is a village and municipality in the Salyan Rayon of Azerbaijan. It has a population of 1,716.
