= Kərimli, Oghuz =

Kərimli
- Location within Azerbaijan Location within Shaki-Zagatala Economic Region
- Coordinates: 40°58′31″N 47°28′21″E
- Country: Azerbaijan
- Rayon: Oghuz
- Time zone: UTC+4 (AZT)
  - Summer (DST): UTC+5 (AZT)

Kərimli (known as Vardanlı until 1991) is a village and municipality in the Oghuz Rayon of Azerbaijan. It has a population of 2,953.
