= Qasım İsmayılov =

Aglavashli Azerbaijani: Ağlavaşlı
- Municipality
- Location within Azerbaijan
- Coordinates: 40°48′52″N 46°15′49″E
- Country: Azerbaijan
- Rayon: Shamkir

Population
  - Total: 1,925
- Time zone: UTC+4 (AZT)
  - Summer (DST): UTC+5 (AZT)

Aglavashli (also, Alabashly, Kasum-Ismailov, Kasum-Izmaylov, and Kasym-Ismailov) is a village and municipality in the Shamkir Rayon of Azerbaijan. It has a population of 1,925.
