= Alabaşlı =

- Municipality
- Location within Azerbaijan
- Coordinates: 40°47′N 46°17′E
- Country: Azerbaijan
- Rayon: Samukh

Population (2008)
  - Total: 1,265
- Time zone: UTC+4 (AZT)
  - Summer (DST): UTC+5 (AZT)

Alabaşlı (also, Khutor Alabashly) is a village and municipality in the Samukh Rayon of Azerbaijan. It has a population of 1,265.
