= Aralık =

- Municipality
- Location in Turkey
- Coordinates: 39°52′22″N 44°31′09″E
- Country: Turkey
- Province: Iğdır
- District: Aralık

Government
  - Mayor: Mustafa Güzelkaya (AKP)
- Elevation: 821 m (2,694 ft)
- Population (2022): 5,809
- Time zone: UTC+3 (TRT)
- Postal code: 76500
- Area code: 0476
- Website: www.aralik.bel.tr

Aralık (Azerbaijani: Aralıq; Kurdish: Başan; Armenian: Արալիխ, romanized: Aralikh; Russian: Аралык, romanized: Aralyk) is a town in the Iğdır Province in the Eastern Anatolia region of Turkey. It is the seat of Aralık District. Its population is 5,809 (2022). Aralık lies near the right bank of the river Aras, across the border from the Armenian town Artashat. It is the location of the Aras corridor, which connects Turkey with Azerbaijan. The town of Aralık is mainly inhabited by Azerbaijanis.

== Government ==
Mustafa Güzelkaya was elected mayor of Aralık in the local elections of March 2019.

== Demographics ==
Historical population

Year	Pop.	±% p.a.
1908	1,756	—
1914	1,988	+2.09%
1980	3,762	+0.97%
1985	4,409	+3.22%
1990	4,201	−0.96%

Year	Pop.	±% p.a.
1997	7,084	+7.75%
2007	7,239	+0.22%
2012	6,986	−0.71%
2017	6,253	−2.19%
2022	5,809	−1.46%

Source: Russian population censuses (1908–1914), Turkish population censuses (1980-1997) and TÜIK (2007-2022)

== See also ==
- Azerbaijan–Turkey border
- Umut Bridge
- Dilucu Border Checkpoint
- Sadarak District
