= Yuxarı Noxudlu =

- Municipality
- Location within Azerbaijan
- Coordinates: 39°39′N 48°56′E
- Country: Azerbaijan
- Rayon: Salyan

Population
  - Total: 914
- Time zone: UTC+4 (AZT)
  - Summer (DST): UTC+5 (AZT)

Yuxarı Noxudlu (also, Yukhary Nokhudlu and Verkhniye Nokhudly) is a village and municipality in the Salyan Rayon of Azerbaijan. It has a population of 914.
