= Hindarx =

Hindarkh
- Municipality
- Azerbaijani: Hindarx
- Location within Azerbaijan
- Coordinates: 40°04′12″N 47°12′17″E
- Country: Azerbaijan
- District: Aghjabadi

Population
  - Total: 16,998
- Time zone: UTC+4 (AZT)

Hindarx (also, Hindarkh) is a village and the most populous municipality, except the capital Aghjabadi, in the Aghjabadi District of Azerbaijan. It has a population of 16,998.
