= Kərimli, Gadabay =

Kərimli
- Location within Azerbaijan
- Coordinates: 40°33′21″N 45°37′54″E
- Country: Azerbaijan
- Rayon: Gadabay
- Time zone: UTC+4 (AZT)
  - Summer (DST): UTC+5 (AZT)

Kərimli (also, Kerimli) is a village in the Gadabay Rayon of Azerbaijan.
