= Sadarak District =

District of Nakhchivan Autonomous Republic in Azerbaijan

Coordinates: 39°42′N 44°54′E

- District
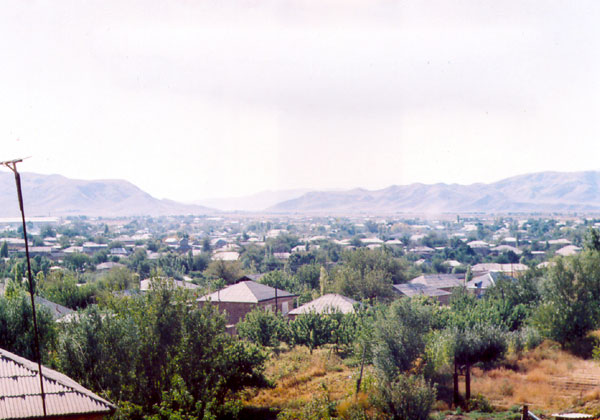

- Map of Azerbaijan showing Sadarak District
- Country: Azerbaijan
- Autonomous Republic: Nakhchivan
- Established: 28 August 1990
- Capital: Heydarabad
- Settlements: 4

Area
  - Total: 160 km^{2} (62 sq mi)

Population (2020)
  - Total: 16,100
  - Density: 100/km^{2} (260/sq mi)
- Time zone: UTC+4 (AZT)
- Postal code: 7300
- Website: sederek-ih.nakhchivan.az

Sadarak District (Azerbaijani: Sədərək rayonu) is one of the 7 districts of the Nakhchivan Autonomous Republic of Azerbaijan. The district borders the district of Sharur, as well as the Iğdır Province of Turkey, Ararat Province of Armenia and the West Azerbaijan Province of Iran. Its capital is Heydarabad and largest settlement is Sadarak. As of 2020, the district had a population of 16,100.

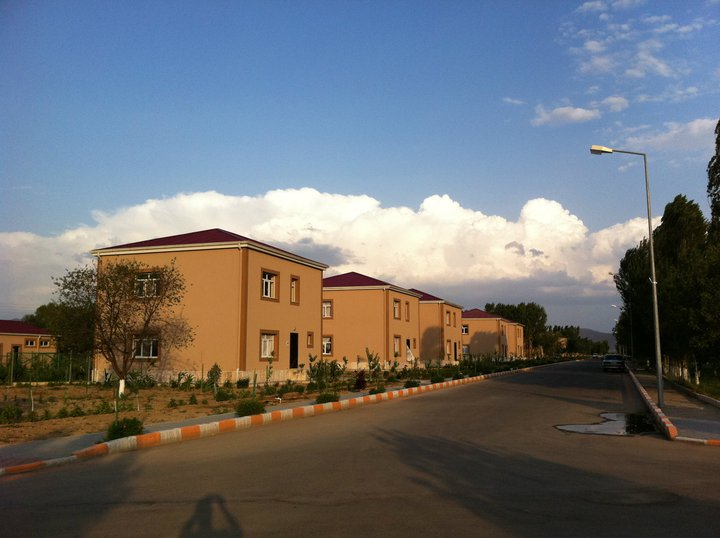
Sadarak Heydarabad Buildings

Sadarak is the only Azerbaijani district bordering Turkey. The Umut Bridge over the Aras, also called the "bridge of hope", links Azerbaijan with Turkey, where the Nakhchivan-Istanbul bus route passes. Sadarak District also includes the Karki exclave which has been controlled by Armenia since the First Nagorno-Karabakh War.

== Etymology ==
There are different theories about the word's origin. Some say Sadarak means three valleys in Farsi. Indeed, there are three valleys in Sadarak: Chanagchichay, Chahannamdara, Bagirsag. Linguists link the word to "sed rang", i.e. a hundred colours. Sedrak means a place inhabited by many people in Arabic. In the 14th century, it was inhabited by the Saadli tribe. Local etymology suggests that Sadarak is made up of steel and garak (flood-prone). Researchers believe that the word relates to a place called Sakrak mentioned in the Book of Dede Korkut.

== History ==
The Barda-Erevan-Nakhchivan-Julfa-Tabriz section of the Great Silk Way linking Azerbaijan's north with Middle Eastern countries passed through Sadarak. During the 1722 attack of Peter the Great on the Caucasus, including Azerbaijan, Nakhchivan fell under the influence of the Ottomans, while following the 1828 Turkmenchay agreement it was passed on to Russia to become part of Erevan province. In a letter to Gen Paskevich from 23 September 1828, A. Griboyedov provided information about the Nakhchivan population. Under the 1828 decree of Czar Nicolas the First, the Armenian Oblast was established in part of the Armenian Highlands, on the territory of the former Erivan and Nakhchivan khanates; about 130,000 Armenians resettled there to their former homes from Iran and Turkey.

31 December 1989 saw an extraordinary event in USSR history as state borders called "the metal grating" were knocked down enabling people to cross the Aras. In early 1990, the Supreme Council of the Nakhchivan SSR passed a shocking decision to secede from the USSR. Proceeding from the Kars agreement, the autonomous republic's legislature asked Turkey, Iran, the UN and other international organizations for help. The decision came like thunder from a clear sky. It was the first time in USSR history when a decision to break away from it was passed by an autonomous republic, not even a fully-fledged republic. Sadarak acquired district status after detaching from Sharur District on August 28, 1990. On 19–20 January 1990, during the First Nagorno-Karabakh War, local Armenian forces seized Sadarak's Karki village.

== Historical sites ==
Sadarak was an important medieval settlement on the Yerevan-Nakhchivan trade road. There are remains of the Sadarak fortress 955 meters above sea level, three medieval mosques, ruins of defence structures, a caravansary, the Agoglan shrine, and a 19-20th century bath-house here. Sadarak's archaeological sites were registered in 1958. The best-known of them is the Agoglan shrine attributed to the 7-11th centuries.

=== Archaeology ===
An important archaeological site in the district of Sadarak is an ancient settlement of Chalcolithic period that stretches over five acres. The settlement is located on the plain, east of the village of Karaagaç. It is known as Kultepe Sadarak, and is of remarkable importance because of its multiple cultural layers that go back to the late Paleolithic period.

Many ceramic products were unearthed here, such as chaff faced pottery, and tableware with painted red lines. The settlement is a testimony of local culture in the V millennium BC, and it brings in new information about the Paleolithic Period in Nakhchivan.

Proto Kura-Araxes pottery is found here, black-burnished pottery, as well as all the other types of Kura-Araxes pottery which followed later. Other related Nakhchivan sites with similar early pottery are Ovcular Tepesi, and Khalaj (archaeology).

== Geography ==
Sadarak District borders Turkey in the south-west (the only bordering zone with Turkey and Azerbaijan is here - 11 km), with Armenia in the north-west – 24 km and Sharur District in the south-east – 27 km.

The climate of Sadarak is continental with hot summer and cold winter. Mineral water springs similar to Istisu and Jeleznovodsk were discovered in Sadarak in 1980.

The territory of the district consists of plains, surrounded by the Ujubiz, Aghdakan, Validag and Tekgar massifs. The Aras River flows along the border between Turkey and Sadarak District.

== Population ==
According to the State Statistics Committee, as of 2018, the population of the region recorded 15.9 thousand persons, which increased by 3.7 thousand persons (30 percent) from 12.2 thousand persons in 2000. Of the population, 8.1 thousand are men and 7.8 thousand are women.

The population of district by the year (at the beginning of the year, thsd. persons)
	2000	2001	2002	2003	2004	2005	2006	2007	2008	2009	2010	2011	2012	2013	2014	2015	2016	2017	2018
Sadarak region	12,2	12,4	12,5	12,7	12,9	13,1	13,4	13,6	13,8	14,0	14,1	14,4	14,6	15,0	15,3	15,4	15,6	15,8	15,9
urban population	-	-	-	0,7	1,3	1,4	1,4	1,5	1,5	1,6	1,7	2,0	2,0	2,0	2,1	2,1	2,1	2,2	2,2
rural population	12,2	12,4	12,5	12,0	11,6	11,7	12,0	12,1	12,3	12,4	12,4	12,4	12,6	13,0	13,2	13,3	13,5	13,6	13,7

== Transportation ==
In 2023, Baku and Ankara agreed on building a railway transport between Turkey and Azerbaijan which would pass from Sadarak.

== Gallery ==
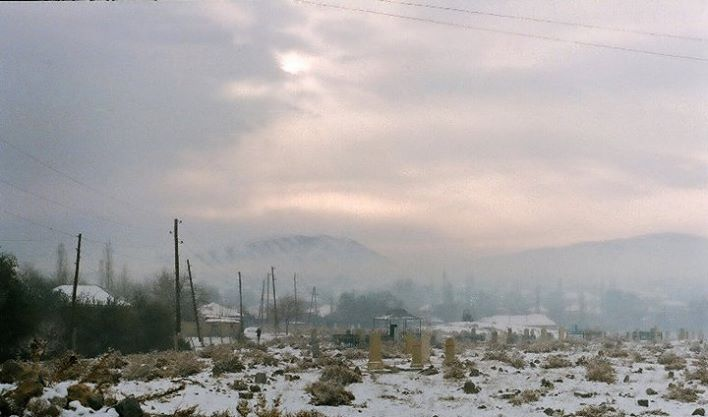
Sadarak

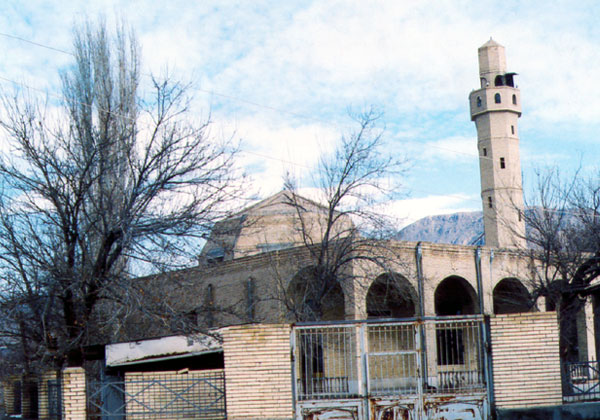
Mosque

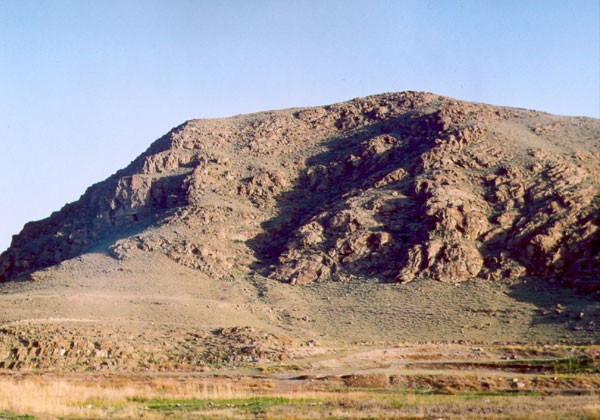
Mountain

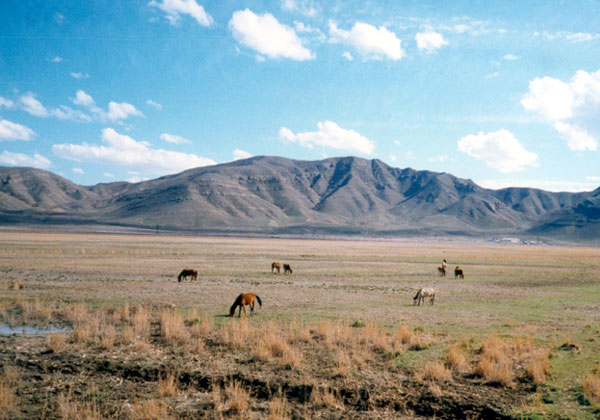
Mountain

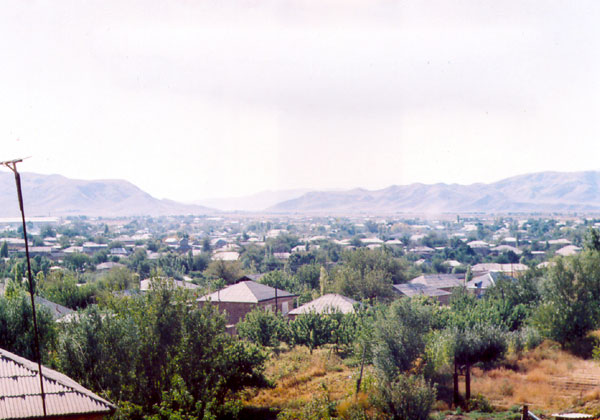
Sadarak

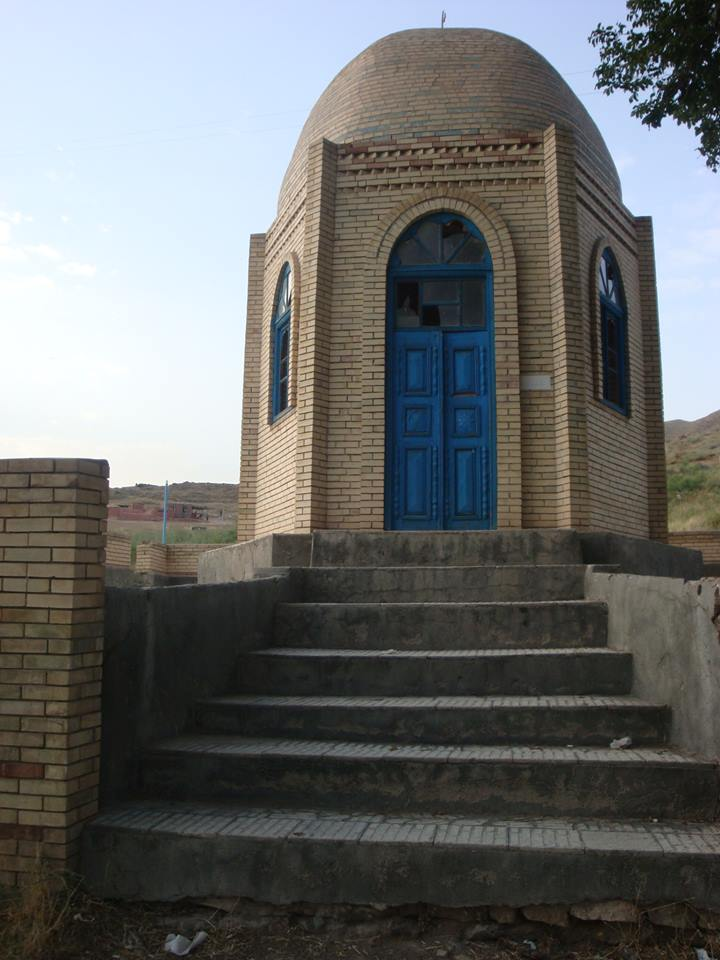
Agoglan

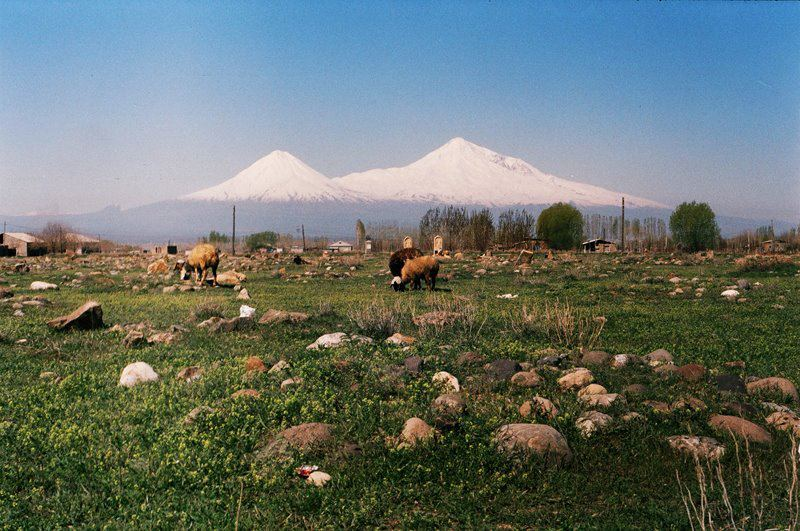
Agri Dagi

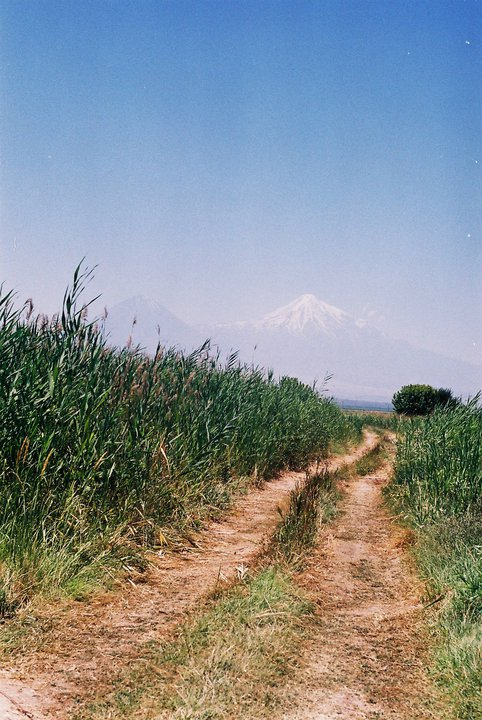
Sadarak

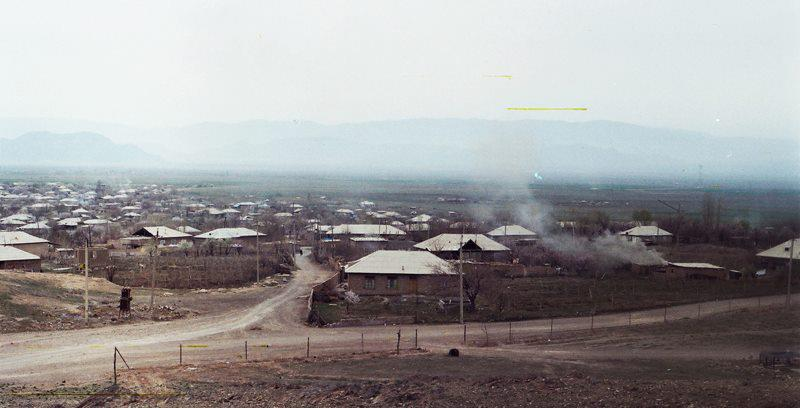
Sadarak

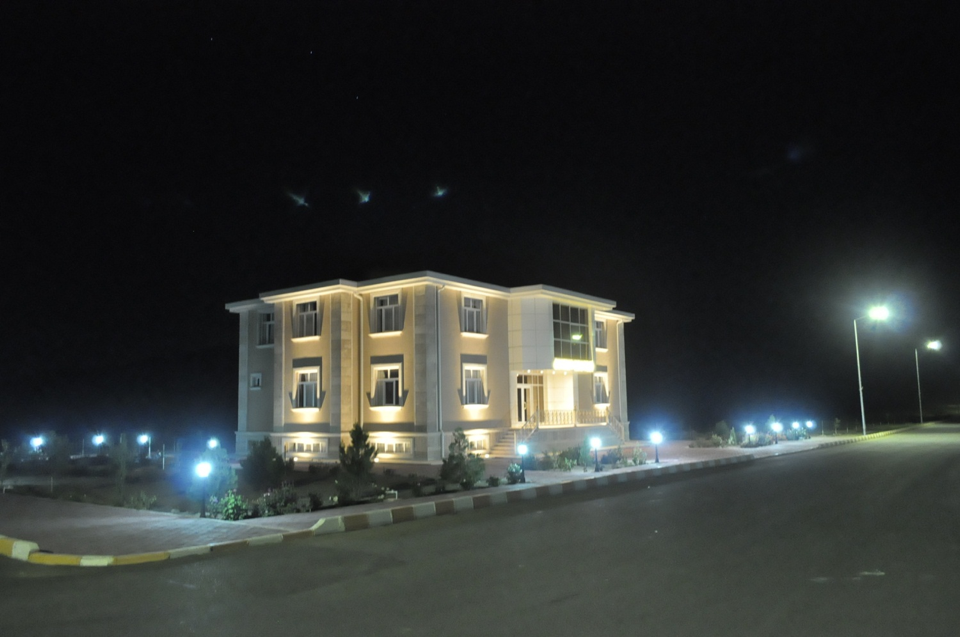
Heydarabad

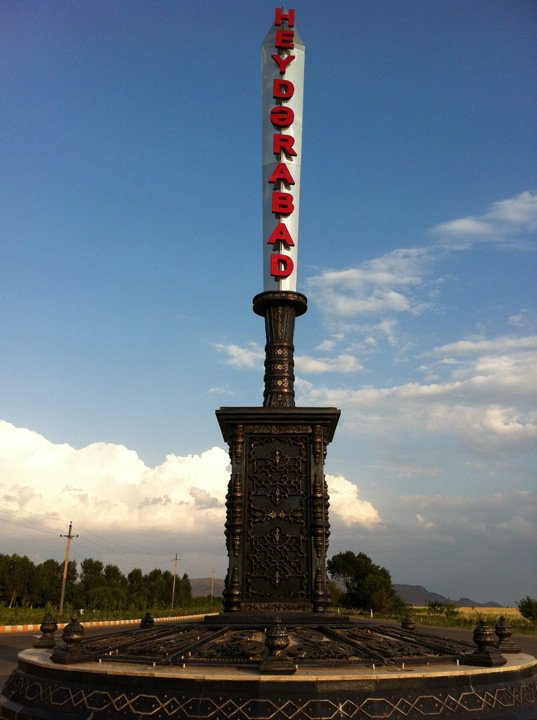
Heydarabad

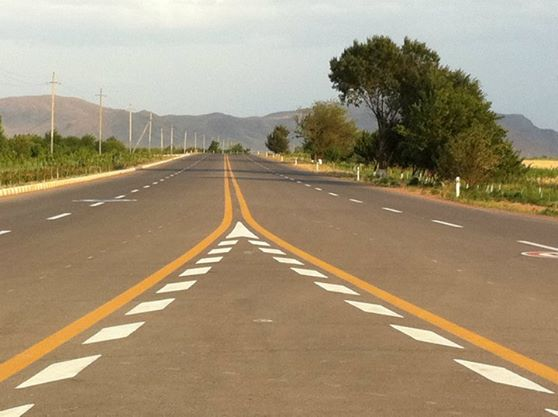
Heydarabad

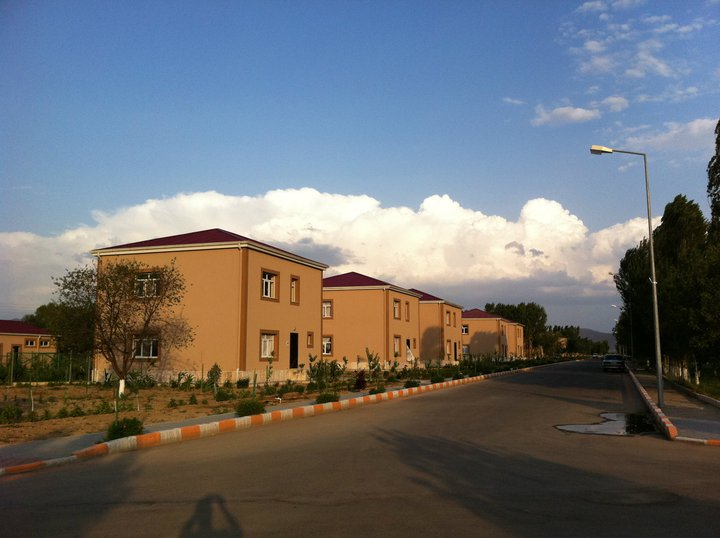
Heydarabad

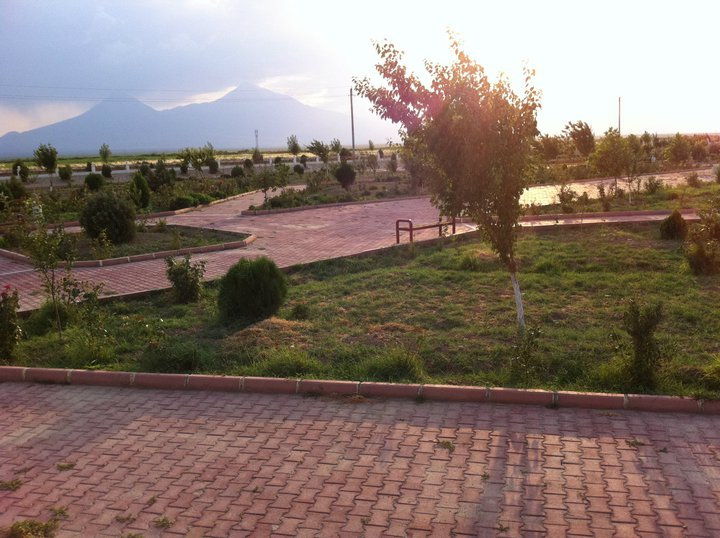
Heydarabad

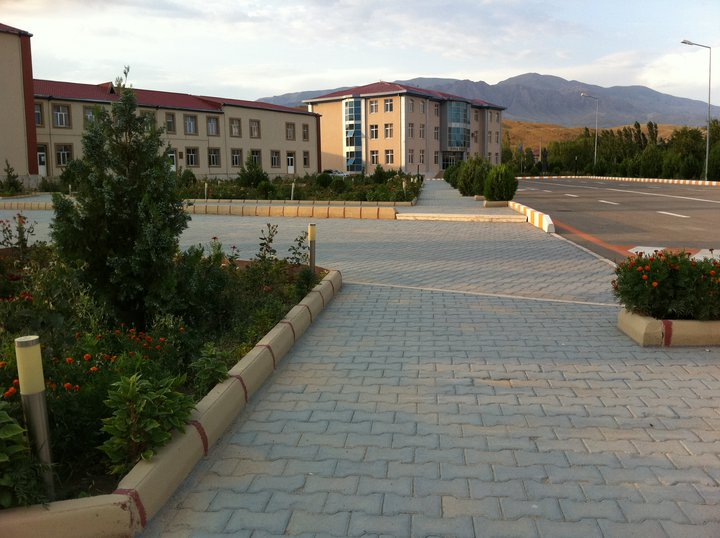
Heydarabad

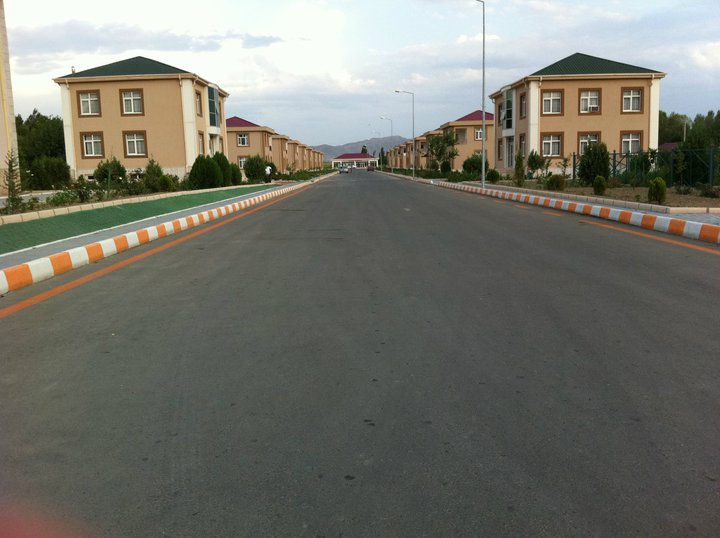
Heydarabad

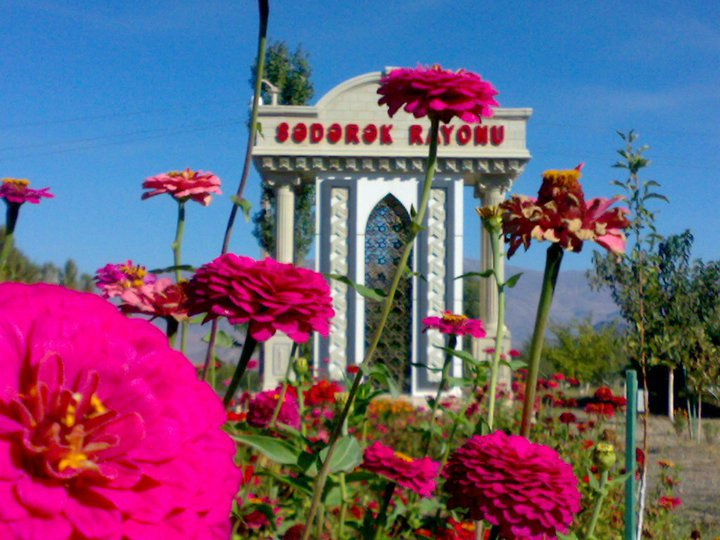
Sadarak

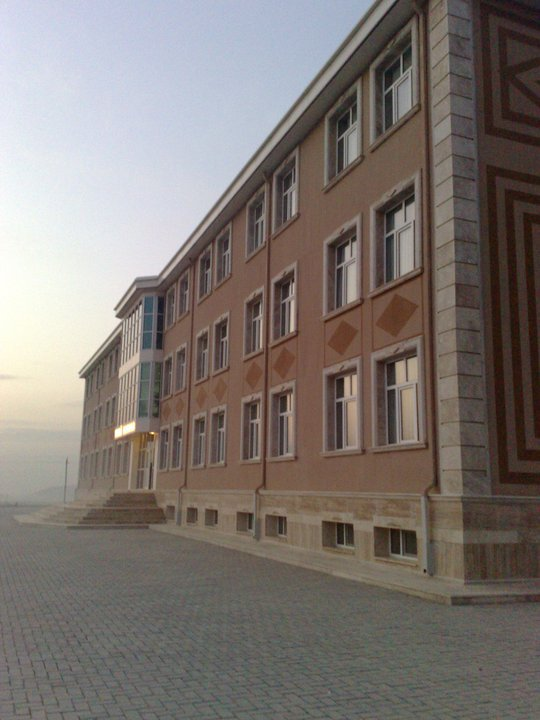
Sadarak School

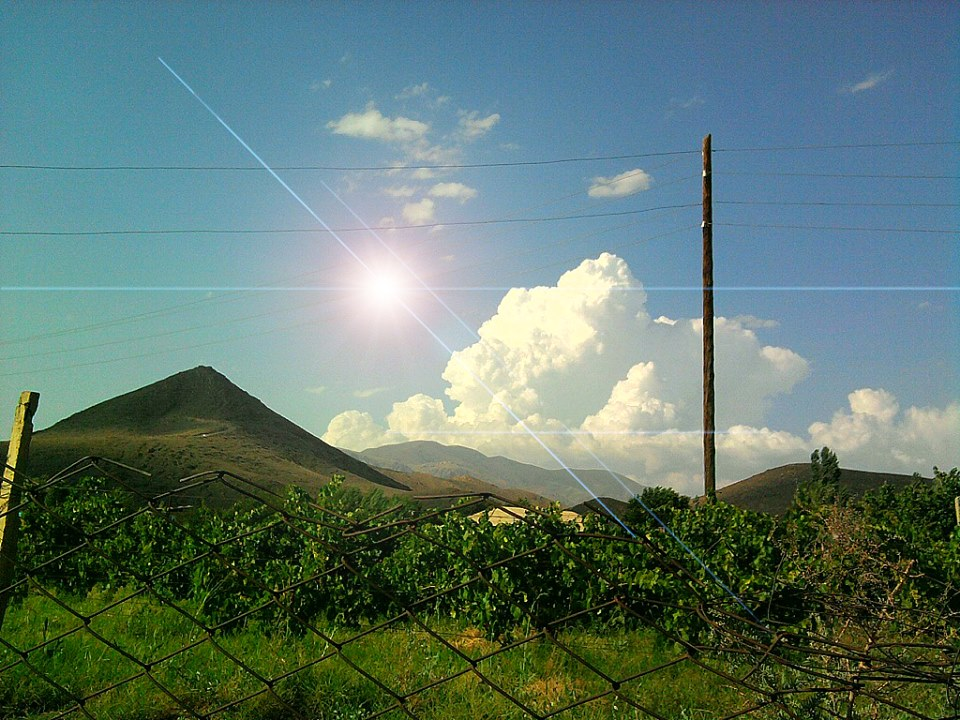
Sadarak

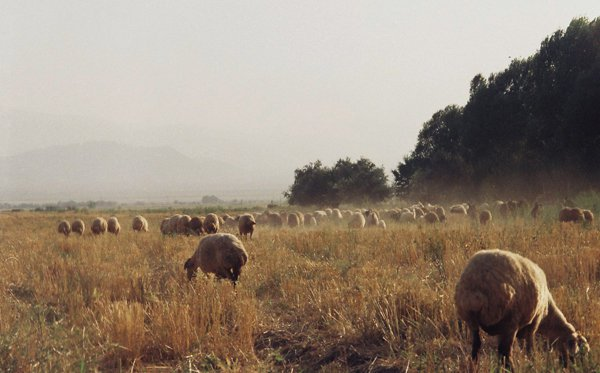
Sadarak

== See also ==
- Azerbaijan–Turkey border
- Umut Bridge
- Aralık
- Dilucu Border Checkpoint
