= Sadarak (town) =

Sadarak Sədərək
- Municipality
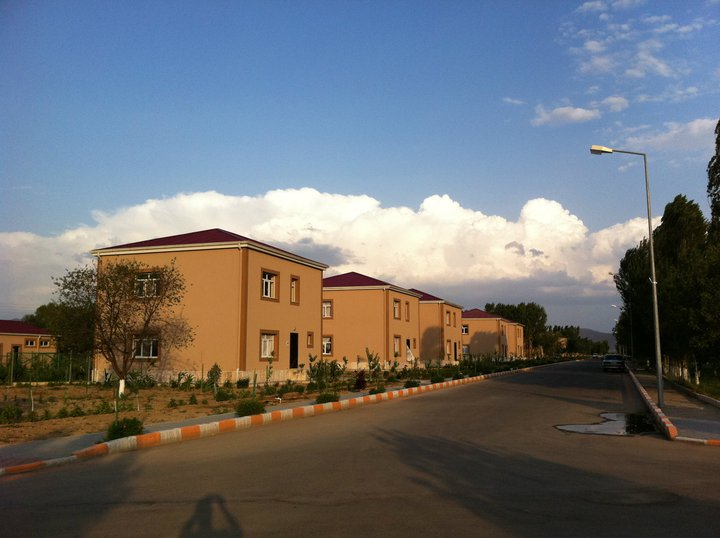

- Location within Azerbaijan
- Coordinates: 39°43′03″N 44°52′35″E
- Country: Azerbaijan
- Autonomous republic: Nakhchivan
- District: Sadarak
- Elevation: 864 m (2,835 ft)

Population (2009)
  - Total: 9,306
- Time zone: UTC+4 (AZT)

Sadarak (Azerbaijani: Sədərək) is a town and the most populous municipality in the Sadarak District of Nakhchivan Autonomous Republic of Azerbaijan. It is located to the north-east of the district center, on the Sadarak plain. Its population is engaged in grain-growing, vine-growing and animal husbandry. There are wine processing plants, a branch of the garment factory of Nakhchivan, two secondary schools, a primary school, kindergartens, technical creativity centre, cultural house, club, library, children's music school, hospital, sanitary-epidemiological station, television transmitter and three mosques in the town. It has a population of 7,260.

== Etymology ==
There are different theories about the origin of the town's name. According to some researchers, the word Sədərək (Sederek) was formed from the combination of the Persian words of "se dərə" (three valleys), or "sed rəng" (hundreds of colours). According to folk etymology, "Sederek" means "sel gerek" (flood-prone). Some researchers, believe that the "Səgrək" name which is mentioned in the epic The Book of Dede Korkut was transformed to "Sederek" as a place name. But, according to recent studies, the name of the "Sederek" comes from the Arabic word Sədər (camp) with an additional suffix of -ək. It is assumed that the town was founded in the former military camp area.

== History ==
=== Ancient period ===
Sederek cave, burial monuments of the Bronze Age, the ruins of the cyclopes building named "Div hörən" (Built by Giant) allows to assume that this area is the ancient human settlement. The researchers, confirmed that the average flow banks of the Araz River including Sederek plain, at different times was part of the large state associations of Van, Medes, Assyrian kingdoms. In early Middle Ages, area have been under the sphere of influence of Persian Empire, the Byzantine Empire, the Arab caliphate, and later the states of Atabegs, Kara Koyunlu and Ag Qoyunlu. In the period of Safavid, Sederek was part of Chukhursad province along with the present territory of the Nakhchivan Autonomous Republic.

=== Medieval period ===
Medieval ages settlement of Sederek has covered a large area on the left bank of the Araz River, in the south-east of the same named town of modern period. Located at the crossroads of trade and caravan routes Sederek, increased to city level in the Middle Ages, here have been built water pipeline with earthenware pipes. French traveler Jean Chardin (1643-1713), Turkish traveler, geographer Evliya Çelebi (1611–82) and others gave interesting information about the Sederek. Evliya Çelebi, who visited Azerbaijan many times (1640–44, 1646–48, 1655–56) writes about Sederek in his work of “Seyahatname”: "We ... have reached the town of Sadarak. The town which is located in the land of Nakhchivan ... is beautiful and prosperous, there have 1000 beautiful houses, countless gardens and vineyards, pleasant climate. All of its population is Shia. Behind the city, at the foot of the high hill near the gardens, the hot water comes out".

=== Since 18th century ===
Since beginning of 18th century, Sederek was under the control of the Ottomans. According to the Turkmenchay Treaty in 1828, Nakhchivan and Erivan Khanate, also along with Sederek have been annexed to Russia.

== Demographics ==
In the 1910 publication of the Caucasian Calendar, Sadarak (Садарак), which had a predominantly Tatar (later known as Azerbaijani) population, erroneously appears to have a population of 42,112 in 1908. The population appeared in a more realistic number in the 1912 publication as 4,127 in 1911, and 4,130 in 1914 (according to the 1915 publication).

In 2009, the town had a population of 9,306.

== Historical-archaeological monuments ==
During the archaeological excavations in 1958 and 1978 in the south of the Sadarak were discovered the settlement of the Neolithic and Early Bronze Age (4-3 millennium of BC). From here were obtained tools made from basalt and tuff (the grain stones, graters, pestle, teeth of sickle, etc.), the obsidian plates, chisel, curry-comb, tools from flint, fragments of various clay pots (pitcher, cup, etc.). The tools were used in grain harvest, in to make tools from a bone and wood, etc. The materials from the place of residence of Sederek are similar to the ceramics products which were revealed from Kultepe I and other monuments of the Eneolit period.
