= LXXXVI Corps =

LXXXVI Corps or 86th Corps may refer to:

- LXXXVI Army Corps, Wehrmacht, Germany
- 86th Rifle Corps, Soviet Union
- 86th (Tailors) Lanarkshire Rifle Volunteer Corps, United Kingdom
- 86th (Liverpool) Lancashire Rifle Volunteer Corps, United Kingdom

== See also ==
- List of military corps by number
- 86th Brigade (disambiguation)
- 86th Division (disambiguation)
- 86th Regiment (disambiguation)
- 86th (disambiguation)
