= 86 =

86 may refer to:

- 86 (number), the natural number following 85 and preceding 87
- 86 (term), a slang term for getting rid of something
- 86 Semele, a main-belt asteroid

== Dates ==
- 86 BC, a year of the pre-Julian Roman calendar
- AD 86, a common year of the Julian calendar
- 1986, a common year of the Gregorian calendar
- 2086, a common year of the Gregorian calendar

== Art and entertainment ==
- 86 (film festival), Ukrainian film festival
- 86 (novel series), a Japanese light novel series and anime series
- "86", a song by Green Day from Insomniac
- Agent 86 or Maxwell Smart, the lead character on Get Smart
- Eighty-Sixed, a 2017 web series created by Cazzie David and Elisa Kalani
- Eighty-Sixed, a 1989 novel by David B. Feinberg
- 86'd, a 2009 novel by Dan Fante
- "86" (Dawn Richard song)

== Transportation ==
- Toyota 86, a sports car
- 86th (disambiguation)
- List of highways numbered 86
- Route 86 (MBTA), a bus route in Massachusetts
- 86 (New Jersey bus), a bus route operated by NJ Transit

== See also ==
- A86 (disambiguation)
- x86
