= 86th Wing =

86 Wing or 86th Wing may refer to:

- No. 86 Wing RAAF, a formation of the Royal Australian Air Force
- 86th Airlift Wing, a formation of the United States Air Force
- 86th Fighter Wing (Air National Guard), a formation of the United States Army Air Corps and later the reserve component Air National Guard of the United States Air Force

== See also ==
- 86th Division (disambiguation)
- 86th Brigade (disambiguation)
- 86th Regiment (disambiguation)
