= 86th =

86th is the ordinal form of the number 86. 86th or Eighty-sixth may also refer to:

- A fraction, 1/86, equal to one of 86 equal parts

== Geography ==
- 86th meridian east, a line of longitude
- 86th meridian west, a line of longitude
- 86th parallel north, a circle of latitude
- 86th parallel south, a circle of latitude
- 86th Street (disambiguation)

== Military ==
- 86th Brigade (disambiguation)
- 86th Division (disambiguation)
- 86th Regiment (disambiguation)

== Other ==
- 86th century
- 86th century BC

== See also ==
- 86 (disambiguation)
