= Göttingen (disambiguation) =

Göttingen is a university city in Lower Saxony, Germany.

Göttingen may also refer to:

== Places ==
- The Göttingen Landkreis (district), in which upper town is located
- Göttingen (Langenau), a village in the town of Langenau, Baden-Württemberg, Germany
- Göttingen, a village in Wadersloh, North Rhine-Westphalia, Germany
- Göttingen, a village in Lahntal, Hesse, Germany

== Music ==
- Göttingen (album), a 2021 live album by Cecil Taylor
- "Göttingen" (song), a 1964 single by Barbara
