= C86 (disambiguation) =

C86 is the NME cassette released in 1986.

C86, C-86, or variation, may also refer to:

- Indie pop, the subgenre the cassette is associated with
- Ruy Lopez, Worrall Attack (Spanish Game) opening in the Encyclopaedia of Chess Openings
- Contracts of Employment (Indigenous Workers) Convention, 1947 (shelved) code
- Freeport/Dornink Airport (FAA LID: C86) in Freeport, Illinois, USA; see List of airports in Illinois
- a Manx's Aztec native mode 8086 MS-DOS cross compiler
- C86, a Draft for Standard C programming language released in 1986 for ANSI C
- Caldwell 86 (NGC 6397), a globular cluster in the constellation Ara
- ARM Hermenegildo Galeana (C86), Mexican Navy ship, Auk-class minesweeper originating in WWII
- C-86 Forwarder, a 1932 military aircraft
- 86th Comiket

== See also ==
- 86 (disambiguation)
- C (disambiguation)
