= List of highways numbered 86 =

The following highways are numbered 86:

== International ==
- AH86 Asian Highway 86
- E86 European route E86

== Australia ==
- Yorke Highway, South Australia
- – Federation Way, Honour Ave (New South Wales)

== Canada ==
- Ontario Highway 86

== Germany ==
- A 86 Bundesautobahn 86 (unbuilt)
- B 86 Bundesstraße 86

== Greece ==
- EO86 road

== Iran ==
- Road 86

== Korea, South ==
- Gukjido 86

== New Zealand ==
- New Zealand State Highway 86

== Poland ==
- S 86 Expressway S86
- DK 86 National road 86

== United States ==
- Interstate 86 (Idaho)
  - Interstate 86 (Connecticut-Massachusetts) (former)
  - Interstate 86 (Pennsylvania–New York)
- U.S. Route 86 (canceled proposal)
- Alabama State Route 86
  - County Route 86 (Lee County, Alabama)
- Arizona State Route 86
- Arkansas Highway 86
- California State Route 86
  - California State Route 86S (former)
- Colorado State Highway 86
- Georgia State Route 86
  - Georgia State Route 86 (1930–1940) (former)
- Illinois Route 86 (former)
- Iowa Highway 86
- K-86 (Kansas highway)
- Kentucky Route 86
- Louisiana Highway 86
  - Louisiana State Route 86 (former)
- Maine State Route 86
- Maryland Route 86
- Massachusetts Route 86 (former)
- M-86 (Michigan highway)
- Minnesota State Highway 86
- Missouri Route 86
- Montana Highway 86
- Nebraska Highway 86 (former)
  - Nebraska Spur 86B
- New Hampshire Route 86 (former)
- New York State Route 86
  - County Route 86 (Broome County, New York)
  - County Route 86 (Cattaraugus County, New York)
  - County Route 86 (Chautauqua County, New York)
  - County Route 86 (Dutchess County, New York)
  - County Route 86 (Montgomery County, New York)
  - County Route 86 (Rockland County, New York)
  - County Route 86 (Suffolk County, New York)
- North Carolina Highway 86
- Ohio State Route 86
- Oklahoma State Highway 86
- Oregon Route 86
- Pennsylvania Route 86
- South Carolina Highway 86
- Tennessee State Route 86
- Texas State Highway 86
  - Texas State Highway Spur 86
  - Farm to Market Road 86
- Utah State Route 86
- Virginia State Route 86
- West Virginia Route 86
- Wisconsin Highway 86

== See also ==
- List of highways numbered 86A
- List of highways numbered 86S
- A86

== Other uses ==
- Highway 86 is the name of an art installation by James Wines

Preceded by 85	Lists of highways 86	Succeeded by 87
