= Route 86 (disambiguation) =

Route 86 may refer to:

- London Buses route 86
- M86 (New York City bus), also referred to as the 86th Street bus
- Route 86 (MBTA)
- Melbourne tram route 86

== See also ==
- List of highways numbered 86
