= Robert Bosch =

German industrialist, engineer and inventor

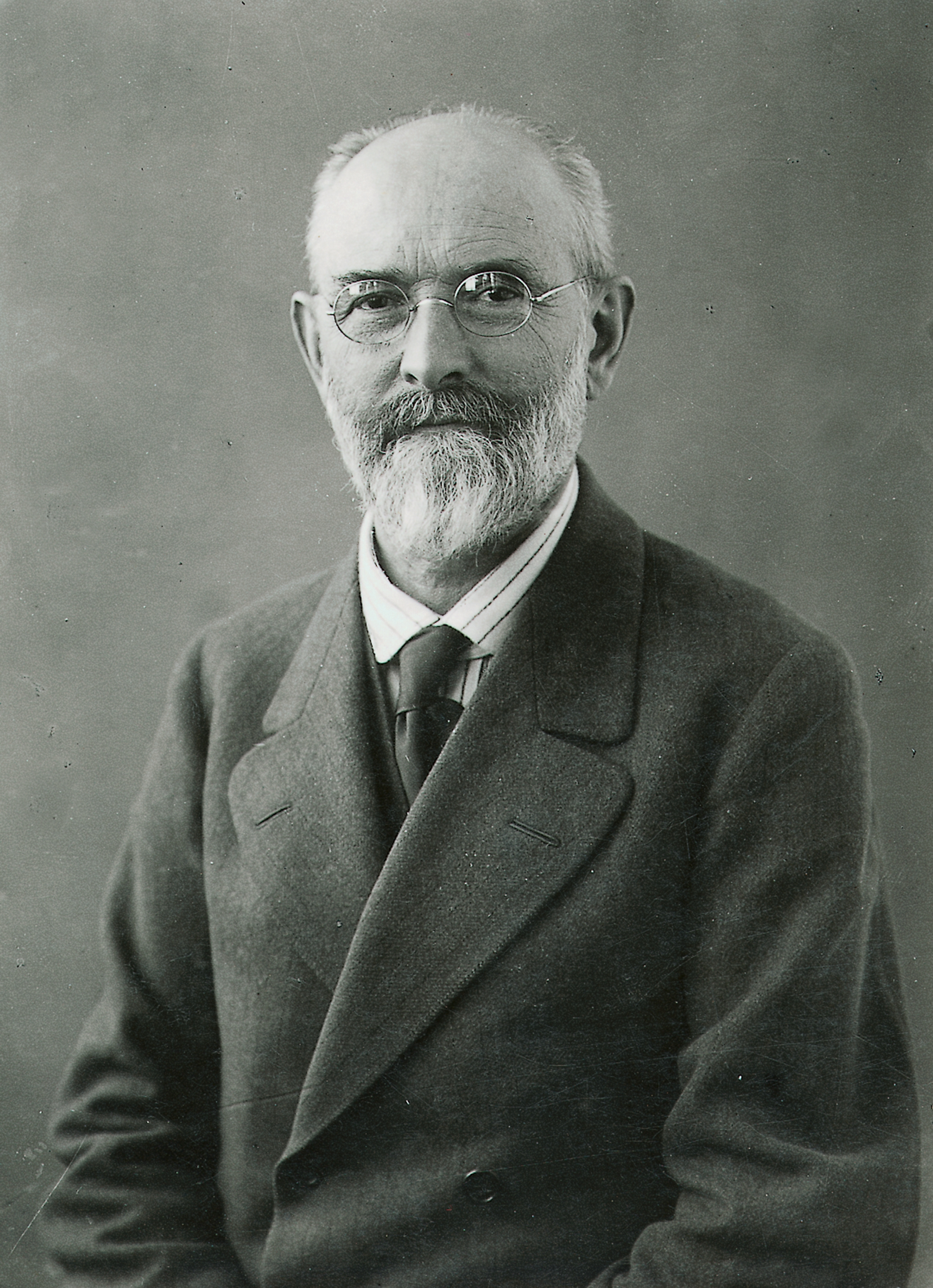
- Bosch in 1925
- Born: 23 September 1861; Albeck, Württemberg
- Died: 12 March 1942 (aged 80); Stuttgart, Nazi Germany
- Known for: Founder of the Robert Bosch GmbH

Robert Bosch (23 September 1861 – 12 March 1942) was a German business magnate, engineer, inventor and founder of the Bosch company.

== Biography ==
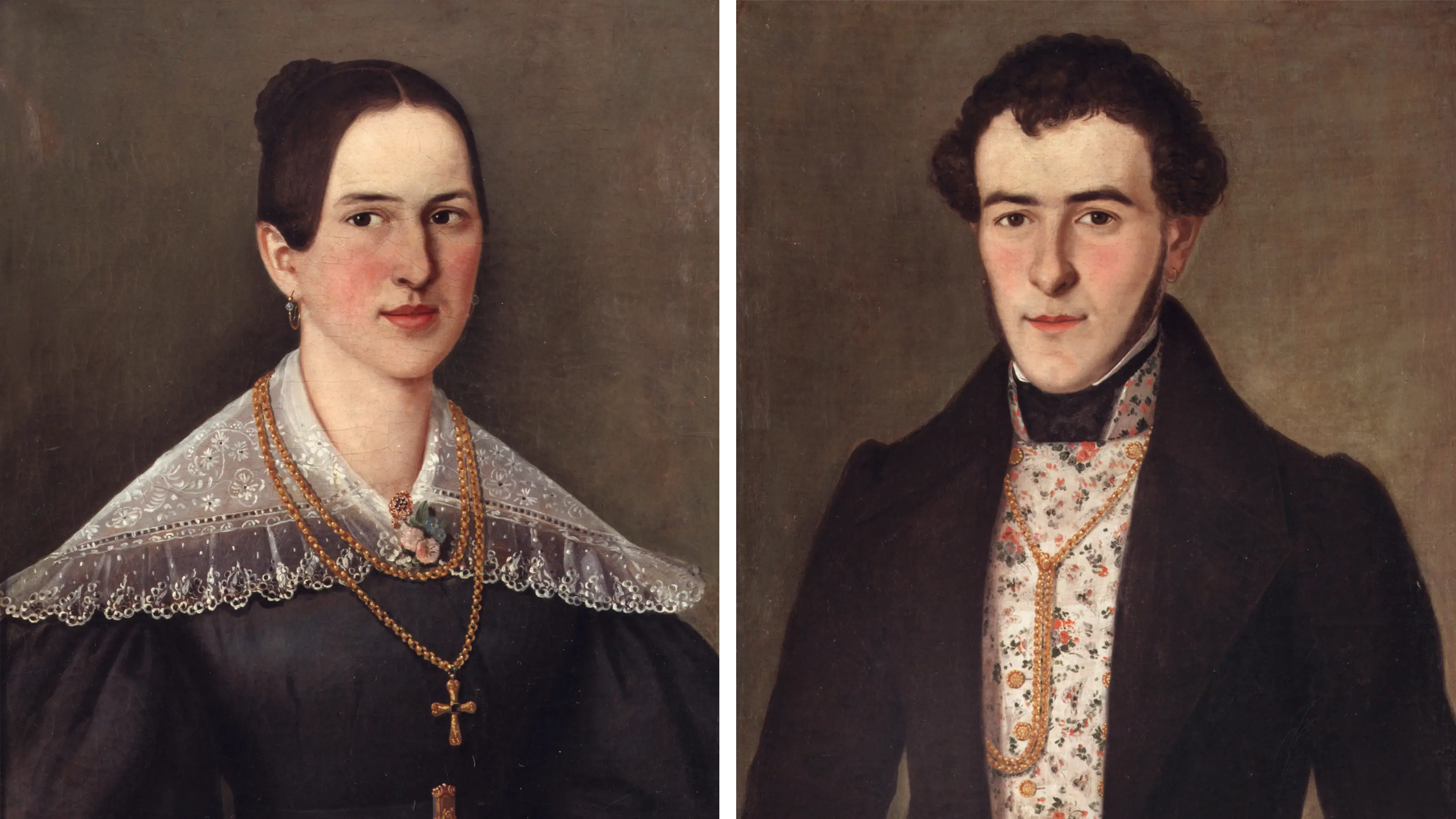
Portraits of Servatius and Maria Margarita Bosch (1838)

Bosch was born in Albeck, in the Swabian Highlands near Ulm. He was one of twelve children born to Servatius Bosch and Maria Margarita Dölle. Servatius ran a large progressive farm that included a brewery. Robert Bosch's nephew was future Nobel laureate Carl Bosch. Robert Bosch attended the 'Realanstalt' in Ulm until 1879, that included an apprenticeship as a "precision-instrument maker." Amongst Bosch's various employments after graduating was that as a journeyman at C. & E. Fein. In 1881 he fulfilled his year of military service in Ulm, followed by employment with Schuckert & Co. until 1883. In 1883-84, Bosch studied under Professor Wilhelm Dietrich at the Stuttgart Technical University.

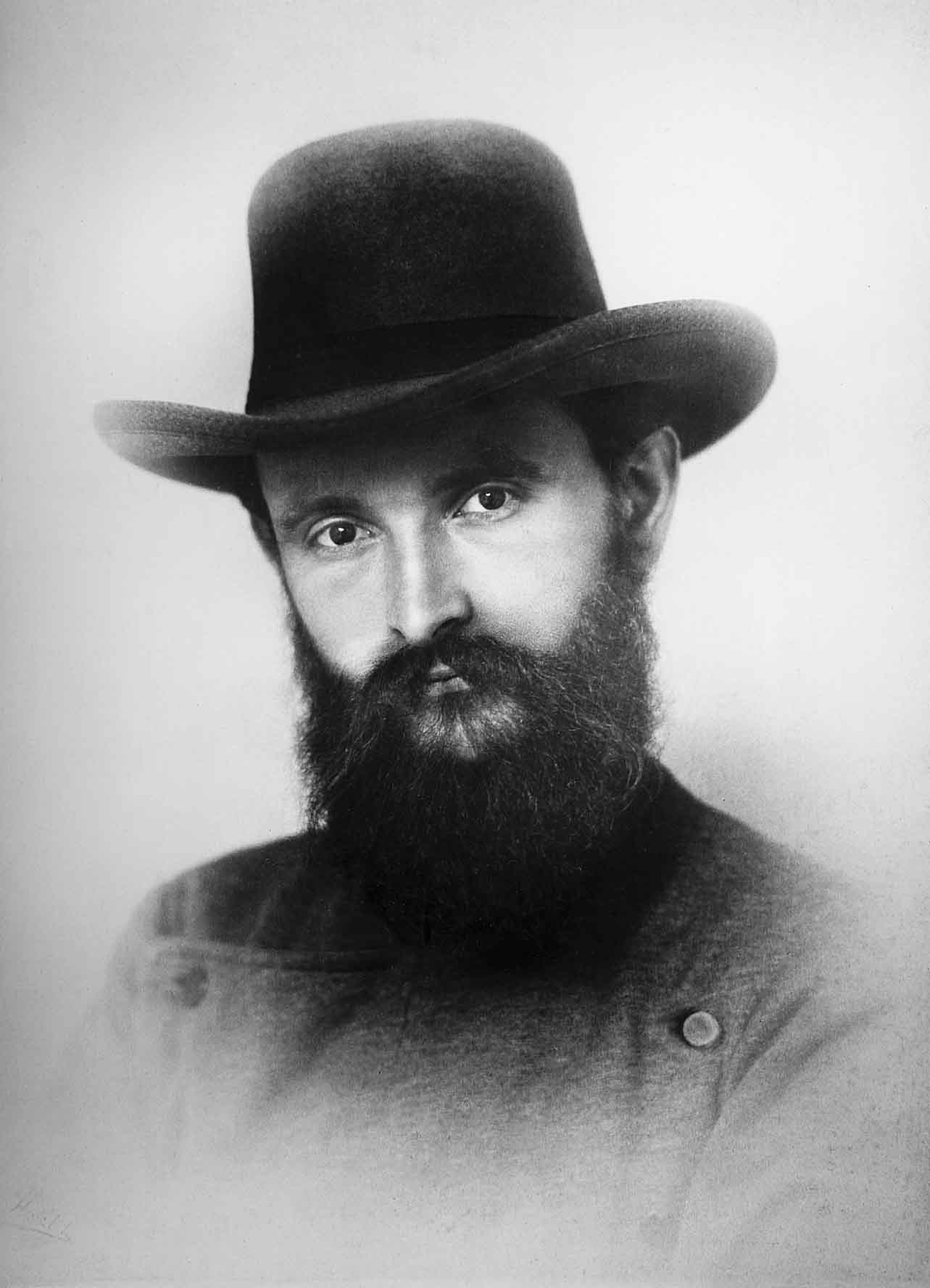
A 1888 portrait of 27-year-old Robert Bosch

On 24 May 1884, Bosch sailed for the United States, becoming an engineer under Thomas Edison and Sigmund Bergmann in New York. On 13 May 1885, Bosch sailed for London, where he found employment with Siemens Brothers. On 15 November 1886, he opened his own "Workshop for Precision Mechanics and Electrical Engineering" in Stuttgart.

In 1887, Gottlieb Daimler asked Bosch if he could build a device similar to the low-voltage magneto device with firing points the Gasoline Engine Factory Deutz was using in their four-stroke engine. Deutz claimed no patents protected the device, so Bosch made four devices. The purpose of the device was to generate an electric spark to ignite the air–fuel mixture in the cylinder at maximum compression. Over the next few years Bosch built a few hundred for factories making gas engines.

In 1893, Frederick Richard Simms met with Bosch, with the goal of adapting the stationary engine magnetos Bosch was building so they could be adapted for motor vehicles. In particular, a Jules-Albert de Dion tricycle was the test case. Arnold Zähringer, and Gottlob Honold, modified the Bosch device so that it had increased power and a faster sequence of sparks necessary, from 250 rpm up to 1800 rpm. Young Rall also modified the electrode, swapping enamel for the asbestos insulator. The complete device was patented. In January 1898, the new magneto was demonstrated on the tricycle and orders soon followed from Gottlieb Daimler. In 1900, in addition to using the device in motor vehicles, the Bosch magneto ignition was used in the Daimler engines on the Zeppelin.

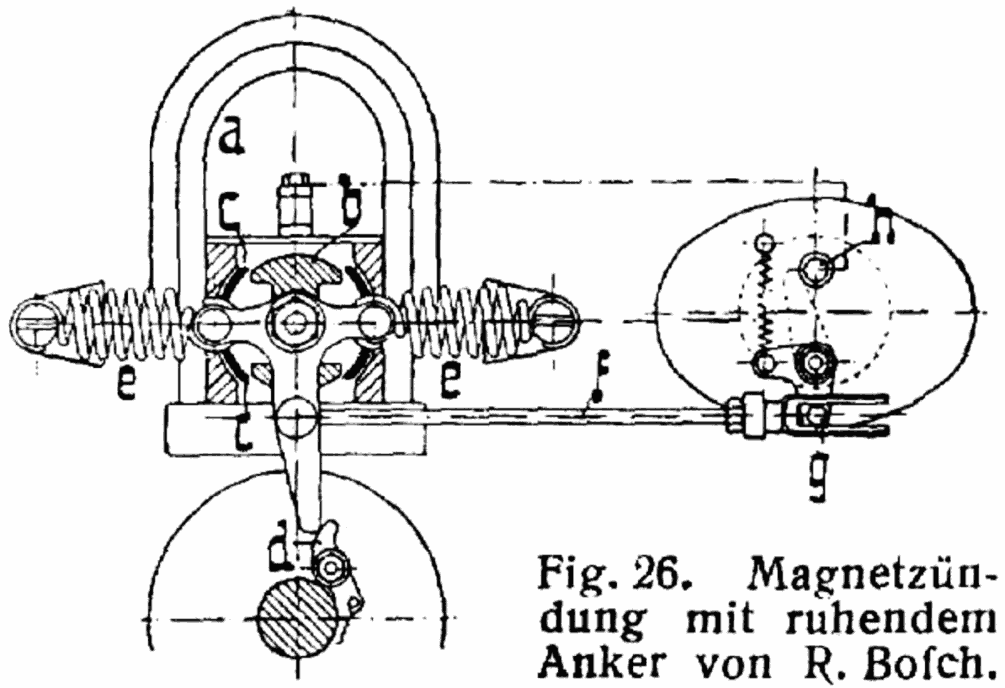
Magnetic ignition

Simms introduced the Bosch ignition device to the English market as Simms-Bosch. In 1899, they entered the French market as the Automatic Magneto Electric Ignition Company, Ltd.

The first sales office and the first factory in the U.S. were opened in 1906 and 1910 respectively. By 1913, the company had branch operations in America, Asia, Africa, and Australia, and was generating 88% of its sales outside Germany. In rapid succession in the years following the First World War, Bosch launched innovations for the motor vehicle, including diesel fuel injection in 1927. In the 1920s the global economic crisis caused Bosch to begin a rigorous program of modernization and diversification in his company. In only a few years' time, he succeeded in turning his company from a small automotive supplier into a multinational electronics group.

From the beginning, Bosch was greatly concerned about promoting occupational training. Prompted by his awareness of social responsibility, he was one of the first industrialists in Germany to introduce the eight-hour work day, followed by other social benefits for his associates. Robert Bosch did not wish to profit from the armaments contracts awarded to his company during WWI. Instead, he donated several million German marks to charitable causes, including for the establishment of Stuttgart's Robert Bosch Hospital.

In the 1920s and 1930s, Robert Bosch was politically active. As a liberal businessman, he sat on a number of economic committees. He devoted a great deal of energy and money to the cause of bringing about reconciliation between Germany and France. He hoped this reconciliation would bring about lasting peace in Europe and lead to the creation of a European economic area.

=== Third Reich ===
Sources claim a complex but ultimately oppositional relationship between Bosch and Nazism. Bosch accepted armaments contracts for all of wartime during World War I and World War II. As much as 60% of Bosch’s revenue came from Wehrmacht contracts in the 1940s. He also maintained close contact with the head of the SS Main Office, Gottlob Berger. According to a New York Herald Tribune article, Hitler awarded Bosch a “Pioneer of Labor” award upon his 80th birthday. Bosch also “declined many public honors, but accepted the Eagle Shield of the Reich from President Von Hindenburg”.

However, at the same time, he used his company and foreign connections to foster anti-Hitler activism. Bosch worked particularly with Carl Friedrich Goerdeler, a figure who was central to the 20 July plot to assassinate Hitler. Goerdeler served as his business advisor, and even after Bosch's death, Goerdeler continued the resistance movement. Bosch's managing staff also joined the Nazi party to prevent external, committed Nazi officials from attaining employment in the company.

Bosch was keenly interested in agricultural issues and owned a farm south of Munich. He was also a passionate hunter. When he died, he was survived by four children from two marriages. A son from his first marriage died in 1921 following a protracted illness.

In 1937, Bosch had restructured his company as a private limited company (close corporation). He had established his last will and testament in which he stipulated that the earnings of the company should be allocated to charitable causes. Also, his will detailed the outline of a corporate constitution, which was formulated by his successors in 1964 and is still in place today.

He was inducted into the Automotive Hall of Fame in 1984.

== See also ==
- Robert Bosch GmbH
- Robert Bosch Stiftung
- Robert-Bosch-Hospital
- German inventors and discoverers
- Bosch Fernseh

== Bibliography ==
- Robert Bosch: The prevention of future crises in the world economic system. London, Constable, 1937 (German edition 1932)
- Theodor Heuss: Robert Bosch – his life and achievements. Transl. by Susan Gillespie. New York, Holt, 1994. ISBN 0-8050-3067-0
- Hans-Erhard Lessing: Robert Bosch. Reinbek 2007 (in German). ISBN 3-499-50594-0
