= Robert Bosch Stiftung =

Charitable institution in Europe

Robert Bosch Stiftung GmbH
- Formation: 1964
- Founder: Robert Bosch
- Headquarters: Stuttgart, Germany
- CEO: Bernhard Straub
- Website: bosch-stiftung.de

Robert Bosch Stiftung GmbH (lit. 'Robert Bosch Foundation') is a German foundation that owns a majority shareholding in the Bosch company, from which it derives its funding. The foundation was established in accordance with the wishes of Robert Bosch, who died in 1942, and conducts and finances social, cultural and scientific projects.

== History ==
In 1921, when Robert Bosch drafted his will, he established the Vermögensverwaltung Bosch GmbH, with instructions to the directors to decide within thirty years of his death whether or not his shares in Robert Bosch GmbH should be transferred into it. Bosch died in 1942, and this transfer took place in 1964. In 1969, the name was changed from Vermögensverwaltung Bosch to Robert Bosch Stiftung.

In 2007, the holding of the Stiftung in Robert Bosch GmbH was approximately 92% of the issued stock. The work of the foundation is financed by income from it.

In 2026, the Robert Bosch Stiftung was designated as an undesirable organization in Russia.

== Work ==
The foundation both conducts and finances social, cultural and scientific projects, in accordance with the wishes of Robert Bosch. In an average year, some eight hundred projects are active, in fields including natural and social sciences, public health, education, and cultural and international relations.

It operates the Robert Bosch Hospital in Stuttgart and a research institute within the hospital, the Dr. Margarete Fischer-Bosch-Institut für Klinische Pharmakologie (Dr. Margarete Fischer-Bosch Institute for Clinical Pharmacology), was established by Margarete Fischer-Bosch in 1973. The Institut für Geschichte der Medizin (Institute for the History of Medicine) is the archive of the foundation. The Stiftung has four subsidiary foundations: the Hans-Walz-Stiftung, which funds naturopathic treatment; the Otto und Edith Mühlschlegel-Stiftung, for projects related to aging; the DVA-Stiftung, for Franco-German cultural relations; and the Rochus und Beatrice Mummert Stiftung, which provides study grants to students from Eastern Europe.

In 2014, the Robert Bosch Stiftung established the Berlin-based Robert Bosch Academy, a multidisciplinary institution that invites distinguished public intellectuals and thinkers from across the world to be Richard von Weizsäcker Fellows in Berlin.

From 1964 to 2017, the foundation provided 1.6 billion euros in funding. In 2017, it issued grants worth 100.5 million euros.

The foundation is involved in work to modernise the German healthcare system. In particular, it is trying to develop more small health centers.

Each year, the Robert Bosch Stiftung issues three Co-Production Prizes for joint film productions by young German filmmakers and their partners from the Arab countries. Until 2015 the Prize was awarded to filmmakers from Germany and Eastern Europe.

Between 1985 and March 2017, the Robert Bosch Stiftung administered the Adelbert von Chamisso Prize, a literary prize for "authors writing in the German language whose literature is affected by cultural changes."

It is a member of the Network of European Foundations for Innovative Cooperation (NEF) and Philea - Philanthropy Europe Association.

== Humanitarian efforts ==
=== Aid to Ukraine ===
The Robert Bosch Stiftung operates in Ukraine across three key areas: international education, mediation, and cultural exchange between countries. One of the foundation's main objectives is to foster mutual understanding between Ukrainian and German societies. For example, the "Ukraine Calling" initiative was designed for German politicians, journalists, economists, and other professionals seeking to deepen their knowledge of Ukraine. The project facilitated interdisciplinary and cross-sectoral cooperation between representatives of both countries, creating a platform for bilateral collaboration.

In 2022, shortly after Russia's full-scale invasion of Ukraine, the foundation announced its support for Ukraine and launched an Emergency Assistance Program. That same year, the Robert Bosch Stiftung became one of seven organizations contributing to the Solidarity Fund for Ukraine within the German network MitOst, raising a total of €1,025,000. These funds were used to procure emergency aid kits, protective equipment, dry food, evacuation tools, solar power stations, radios, and laptops.

Also in 2022, together with other international charitable organizations and the NGO Alliance4Ukraine, the Robert Bosch Stiftung supported the Optima school with a €500,000 grant. This funding enabled over 100,000 Ukrainian students, including high school graduates, to complete their war-affected academic year without disruption and receive recognized educational certificates. In 2024, the foundation backed the VILNO educational program, aimed at helping veterans of the Russo-Ukrainian war reintegrate into civilian life, particularly those who had worked in the cultural and educational sectors before their military service. The program is implemented by the Ukrainian NGO Insha Osvita.
