= Tancrède (French singer) =

French singer

Tancrède is a contemporary French singer born in Paris.

== Biography ==
Attracted early to music, Tancrède wrote his first song when he was nine. He never stopped writing thereafter, and sang on the classical airs he learned at the Music school in Paris. He graduated with piano as a major.

In parallel, he studied Law and graduated from the Law School in Paris.

On the very evening of his oath-taking as a lawyer, he performed on the Sentier des Halles in Paris. For two years he led this double life, and as the number of concerts were increasing, he decided to leave his court dress and move on with music.

== 1st Album ==
Tancrède's first album (Tancrède) was released in September 2005 by ULM-Universal, a Universal Music Group label. Directed by Roland Romanelli, a member of the band Space, and the arranger and musician of Barbara. On its release, the album was greeted by critics with enthusiasm. Many concerts followed in 2006 and 2007 in theaters such as La Cigale and le Trianon.

== Audimat! ==
In 2008, Tancrède wrote his first musical, Audimat! which received good critics for the challenge of a Broadway-style musical written entirely in French. Performances were held at la Cigale, with Stéphan Druet as stage director. Ambianced in the ruthless world of television, Audimat depicts two competing channels struggling to win the attention of the stay-at-home moms.

== Endorphine ==
At the end of 2012, Tancrède will release his new album called Endorphine.

== Discography ==
- Tancrède, 2005 (Ulm - Universal Music)
- Audimat!, 2008 (Universal Classic)
- Endorphine, late 2012
