= Robert Bosch Hospital =

Hospital in Stuttgart, Germany

Coordinates: 48.8144°N 9.1872°E

The Robert Bosch Hospital (German: Robert Bosch Krankenhaus, RBK) is a charitable hospital in Stuttgart, Germany. The hospital was opened in April 1940 and was sponsored by Robert Bosch. In 1973 a new building for the hospital was opened.

The Robert Bosch Krankenhaus logo.

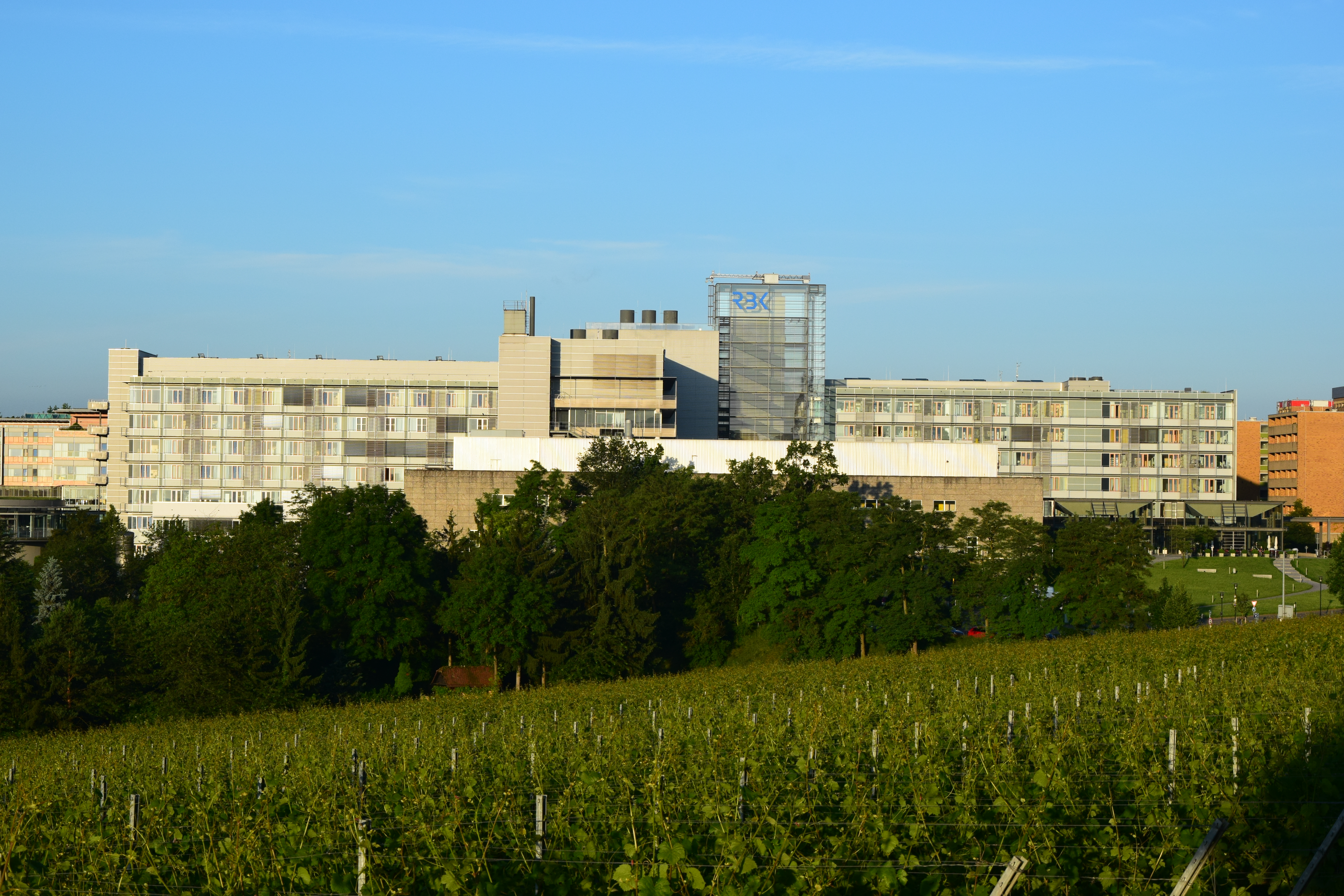
The Robert Bosch Hospital.

Robert Bosch founded the Stuttgarter Homöopathische Krankenhaus GmbH in 1915 and provided funds for a hospital to be built. World War I delayed this, but in 1936 he purchased land to build the hospital on, with construction beginning in 1937 and the first patients arriving in 1940. The hospital combined traditional medical care with homeopathic treatments.

The Robert Bosch Krankenhaus, forms part of the Bosch Health Campus, which also includes the Irmgard Bosch Learning Center, which provides education and training for healthcare professionals, a number of health research facilities, such as the Robert Bosch Center for Tumor Diseases and the Institute for the History of Medicine, and the campus includes the Robert Bosch Center for Innovative Health, which is focused on funding. The hospital is run by Robert Bosch Stiftung.

The hospital specialises in geriatric care, cardiology, oncology and lung disease, including the treatment of rare conditions and treats approximately 40,000 people annually. It has over 1,000 beds. The hospital has a network of 15 medical centers and collaborates with research institutes, universities and with medical technology businesses.
