= Nadia Parfan =

Ukrainian film director (born 1986)

- Надія Парфан
- Born: 6 September 1986 (age 39); Ivano-Frankivsk, Ukrainian SSR, Soviet Union
- Education: National University of Kyiv-Mohyla Academy (BA; MA); Central European University; Temple University
- Occupations: Anthropologist, film director and creative producer
- Organization(s): Co-founder of 86 film festival and founder of Takflix media platform
- Spouse: Ilya Gladshtein

Nadia Yaroslavivna Parfan (Ukrainian: Надія Ярославівна Парфан; born 6 September 1986) is a Ukrainian anthropologist, film director and creative producer who is the co-founder of the 86 film festival, and a member of the Ukrainian Film Academy.

== Early life and education ==
Born on 6 September 1986, in the Ukrainian city of Ivano-Frankivsk. She received degrees from Central European University in social anthropology and Kyiv's National University of Kyiv-Mohyla Academy in cultural studies (B.A. in 2007; M.A. in 2009). She was a Fulbright visiting fellow at Philadelphia's Temple University in 2012–2013. She completed a DOK PRO documentary film directing course at the Andrzej Wajda Film School in Warsaw in 2015, having been awarded a Gaude Polonia stipend.

Later, as part of the Culture Bridges international mobility award, Nadia enrolled at the National Film and Television School (NFTS) in Beaconsfield and started an internship at the Nowness platform in London. There, she was recommended to take a quick course called Directing the Documentary, which covered the kind of BBC-style documentary that piqued my curiosity.

== Career ==
Nadia served as the assistant director to Jonathon Narducci on the Love Me documentary produced by Powershot Production in Los Angeles. Beginning in 2014, she transitioned to creating her own films, taking on roles as a writer and director. Her student film, Reve ta Stohne on Tour (2016), earned special recognition at DocuDays UA IHRFF and was officially selected for the Warsaw International Film Festival. Her debut feature, Heat Singers (2019), premiered in the international competition at Visions du Réel. The film garnered accolades, including the Best Documentary Film award from the Ukrainian Film Academy in 2019 and recognition as the best documentary by the Ukrainian Film Critics Association.

In 2023, Nadia would go on to direct the film That is my sea, with Illia Gladshtein as the producer. That same year in March, she pays tribute to the works of Claude LeLouch by lensing modern-day Kyiv in the same manner, at a dizzying pace while a vehicle speeds through its streets. It's A Date, a short film she made. The film was a Takflix creation that was chosen for the 2023 Berlinale and earned a Special Mention from the International Short Film Jury, captures the sense of contemporary conflict and the loss of normalcy through visuals displayed on a global scale during Russia's invasion of Ukraine. The New Yorker website released the short video "I didn't want to make a film about war" in 2023.

== Other works ==
The 86 International Festival of Film and Urbanism in Slavutych, Ukraine, which she co-founded and curates, runs from 2014 to 2019. She launched Takflix.com, an online theater for Ukrainian films, in 2019, and the documentary distribution company 86PROKAT.

== Personal life ==
Nadia and her husband, Ilya Gladshtein, had resided in Kyiv before to the invasion of that country, although they usually spent the winters in Dahab, to avoid the city's gloomy and frigid months. It was there in February of last year that they witnessed Russian forces overrunning their nation. She made the decision the next morning to return to Ukraine and record her flight and return. She went alone, first to Austria, then to the Czech Republic, then to Poland and the border, after she and Ilya decided she would go and he would stay.
