= Bundesautobahn 864 =

Federal motorway in Germany

A 864
- Bundesautobahn 864

Route information
- Length: 6 km (3.7 mi)

Location
- Country: Germany
- States: Baden-Württemberg

Highway system
- Roads in Germany; Autobahns; List; Federal; List; State; E-roads

Bundesautobahn 864 (translates from German as Federal Motorway 864, short form Autobahn 864, abbreviated as BAB 864 or A 864) is an autobahn spur in southwestern Germany, connecting Donaueschingen with Bad Dürrheim.

The A 864 was supposed to be a part of the planned A 86. The current Autobahn still retains its kilometer counter, which counts from 84 to 90.

== Exit list ==
State	District	Location	km	mi	Exit	Name	Destinations	Notes
Baden-Württemberg	Schwarzwald-Baar-Kreis	Donaueschingen	84.0	52.2	1	Donaueschingen	B 27 – Freiburg, Schaffhausen, Donaueschingen; Offenburg, Villingen-Schwenningen, Bad Dürrheim	western endpoint of motorway
Baden-Württemberg	Schwarzwald-Baar-Kreis	Bad Dürrheim	90.0	55.9	2	Dreieck Allgäu	A 81 – Singen, Stuttgart	eastern endpoint of motorway
1.000 mi = 1.609 km; 1.000 km = 0.621 mi: Concurrency terminus; Incomplete access; Proposed; Route transition
