= List of highways numbered 86A =

The following highways are numbered 86A:

== United States ==
- Nebraska Highway 86A (former)
  - Nebraska Spur 86A
- New York State Route 86A (former)

== See also ==
- List of highways numbered 86
