= Barbara (singer) =

French singer (1930–1997)

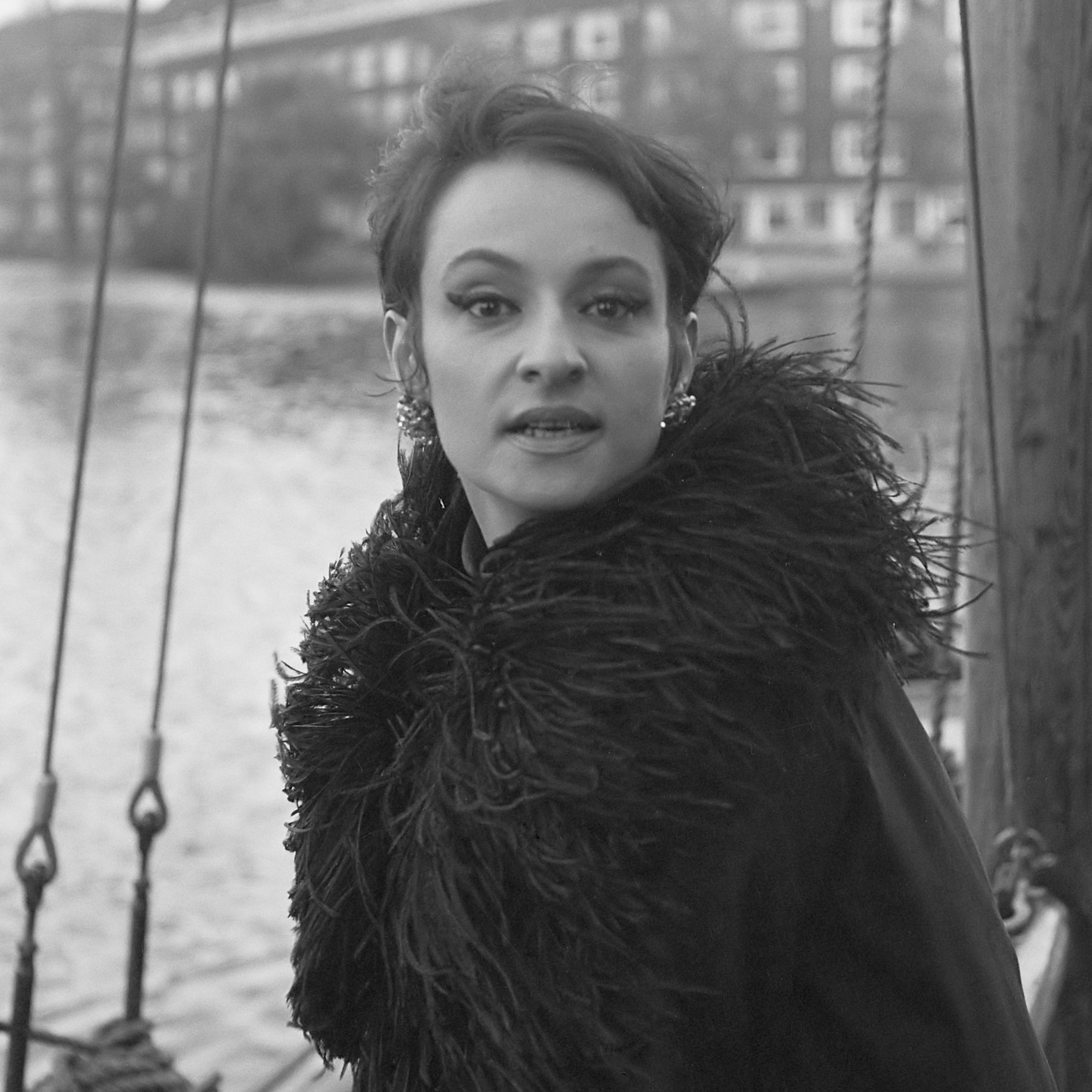
- Barbara in Amsterdam in 1965

Background information
- Also known as: La Chanteuse de minuit ('the midnight singer'); La Dame en noir ('the lady in black')
- Born: Monique Andrée Serf; 9 June 1930; Paris, France
- Died: 24 November 1997 (aged 67) Neuilly-sur-Seine, France
- Genres: Chanson; French pop
- Occupations: Singer-songwriter; actress
- Instruments: Vocals; piano
- Years active: 1958–1996
- Label: Universal Music Group

Monique Andrée Serf (French pronunciation: [mɔnik sɛʁ]; 9 June 1930 – 24 November 1997), known as Barbara ([baʁbaʁa]), was a French singer. She has been described as "one of the greatest voices in French song".

She took her stage name from her grandmother, Varvara Brodsky, a native of Odesa, Ukraine. Barbara became a famous cabaretière in the late 1950s in Paris, known as La Chanteuse de minuit ('the midnight singer'), before she started composing her own tracks, which brought her to fame. Her most famous songs include "Dis, quand reviendras-tu ?" (1962), "Ma plus belle histoire d'amour" (1966) and "L'Aigle noir" (1970), the latter of which is said to have sold over 1 million copies in just twelve hours.

== Early life ==
Born on Rue Brochant in Paris to a Jewish family. Her father, Jacques Serf (1904–1959), was a leather salesmen of Alsatian origin and her mother, Ester Brodsky (1905–1967), was a civil servant from Tiraspol. She was the second of four children: Jean (born 1928), Régine (born 1938), and Claude (born 1943). Barbara lived in northwestern Paris as a child. She then lived in Roanne starting in 1938, and in Tarbes starting in 1941. Barbara was 13 years old when she went into hiding during the German occupation of France during World War II. Her family was hidden by the family of conductor Jean-Paul Penin from 1943 to 1945, first in Préaux and then in Saint-Marcellin.

After the war ended, Barbara's family came back to Paris in 1946, and settled on Rue Vitruve in the 20th arrondissement. Her childhood dream was to become a pianist, but a problem with her hand made such a career impossible. To console her, her parents agreed to pay for singing lessons. A neighbourhood music professor, who heard her sing, took an interest in helping her develop her talents. She was given vocal lessons and taught to minimally play the piano; eventually she enrolled at the École Supérieure de Musique in 1947. Money was a problem and she gave up her musical studies in 1948. She was first recruited at the Théâtre Mogador, before a stint in Belgium, where she performed under the stage name Barbara Brodi. Late 1951, she returned to Paris to audition at La Fontaine des Quatre Saisons, a popular cabaret in the 7th arrondissement. However, as she failed to become a permanent cast member, she returned to Brussels. In 1955, she returned to Paris; with more luck, she began to sing at various cabarets throughout the capital, with a growing audience.

She was deeply scarred by the war and her family's plight. The feelings of emptiness experienced during childhood showed in her songs, particularly "Mon Enfance". She said in her uncompleted autobiography, Il était un piano noir (assembled from notes found after her death), that her father sexually abused her when she was 10 and she hated him for that. He later abandoned the family.

== Career ==
=== Early career ===
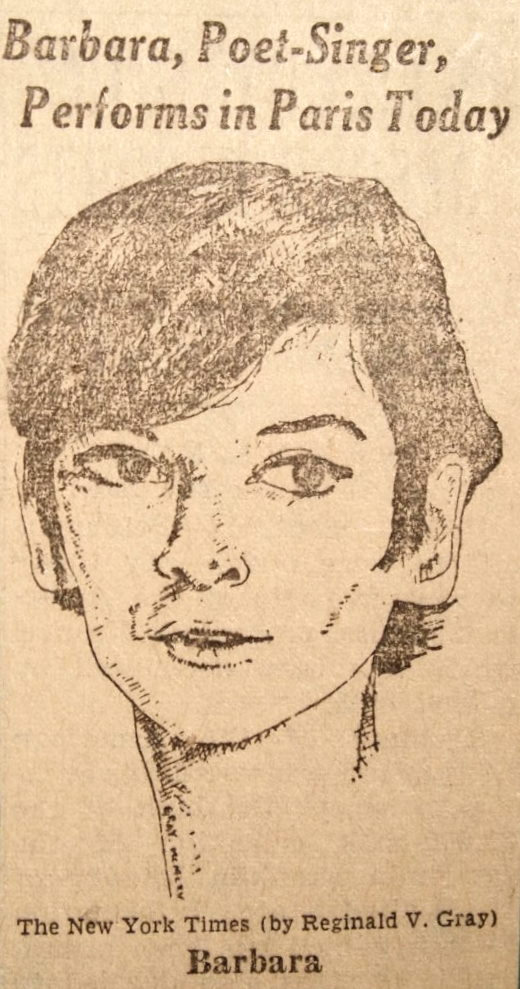
The New York Times portrait of Barbara by Reginald Gray

A tall person, Barbara dressed in black as she sang melancholy songs of lost love. From 1950 to 1951, after her father's desertion of her family, she lived in Brussels, where she became part of an active artistic community, before visiting Charleroi, where she befriended many artists. Her painter and writer friends took over an old house, converting it into workshops and a concert hall with a piano where she performed the songs of Édith Piaf, Juliette Gréco and Germaine Montero. However, her career evolved slowly and she struggled constantly to eke out a living.

Returning to Paris, she met Jacques Brel and became a lifelong friend, singing many of his songs. Later she met Georges Brassens, whose songs she began to use in her act and to record on her first album. In the 1950s, she sang at some of the smaller clubs and began building a fan base, particularly with the young students from the Latin Quarter. In 1957, she went back to Brussels to record her first single, but it was not until 1961 that she got a real break when she sang at the Bobino Music-Hall in Montparnasse. Dressed in a long black robe, she gave a haunting performance, but the Parisian critics said she lacked naturalness and was stiff and formal in her presentation. She continued to perform at small clubs, and two years later at the Théâtre des Capucines she succeeded with the audience and critics alike, singing new material she had written herself. From that point on, her career blossomed and she signed a major recording contract in 1964 with Philips Records.

=== Middle years ===
She returned to Bobino in 1964 for several sold-out performances. She performed at the Paris Olympia and other important venues in France, becoming one of her country's most beloved stars. In 1964, she released the album Barbara chante Barbara, which became a critical and financial success, winning in 1965 the Grand Prix du Disque of the Charles Cros Academy. At the award ceremony, Barbara tore her award into several pieces, giving a piece to each of her technicians as a sign of her gratitude.

=== Acting ===
In 1969, Moustaki wrote the theme song "Moi, je me balance" for the film La fiancée du pirate that Barbara sings. She announced that she would limit her concert singing, and in 1970 she made her acting début in the stage play Madame that proved to be a commercial flop. In 1971, she co-starred with Jacques Brel in a film he directed titled Franz. Two years later she starred in L'Oiseau rare directed by Jean-Claude Brialy. Her final film role came in 1975 in Je suis né à Venise by choreographer Maurice Béjart.

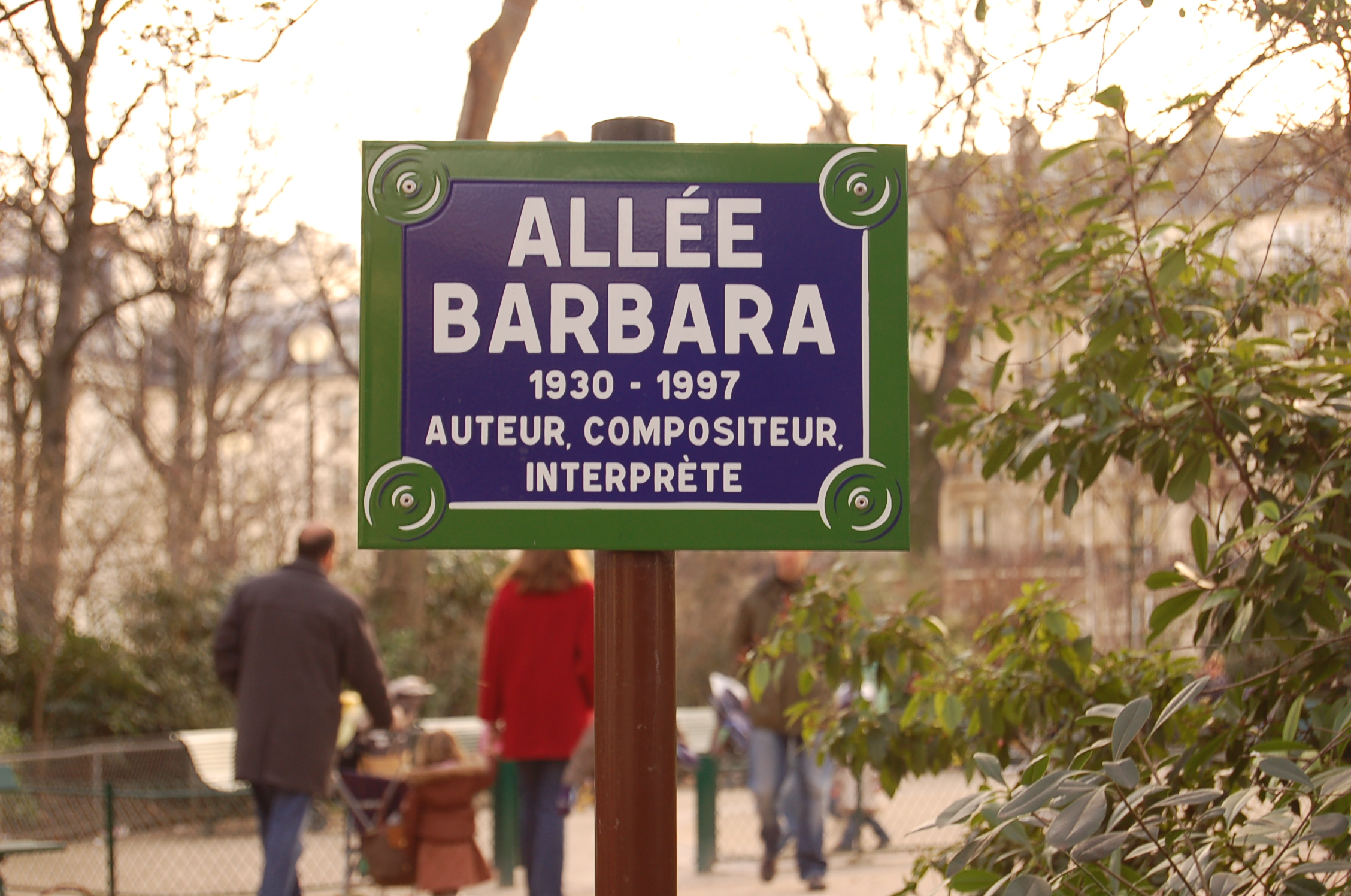
Allée Barbara in Paris

== Later years and death ==
In the 1970s, Barbara made appearances on television variety shows with stars such as Johnny Hallyday and a tour of Japan, Canada, Belgium, Israel, the Netherlands and Switzerland. Through the 1980s, she continued to tour and to write songs; her album Seule was one of France's top grossing releases of 1981. The next year she was awarded the Grand Prix du Disque in recognition of her contribution to French culture. She developed a close working relationship with rising film star Gérard Depardieu and his wife Élisabeth, collaborating on songs for film and records. In 1986, she went to New York City to perform on piano at the Metropolitan Opera with Mikhail Baryshnikov in a song and dance ballet presentation. She co-wrote the music for the stage play Lily Passion with Luc Plamondon, in which she co-starred with Depardieu. It told the story of a killer who murders someone each time he hears her sing.

In the latter part of the 1980s, she became active in the fight against AIDS. She recorded SID'Amour à mort and gave out condoms at performances. In 1988 the government of France awarded her the Legion of Honour. Health problems impeded her performing and she began to devote time to the writing of her memoirs. However, she recorded another successful album in 1996 before she died of respiratory problems in Neuilly-sur-Seine (a suburb of Paris), on 24 November 1997. She was interred in the family grave at the Cimetière de Bagneux in southwest Paris.

The Paris Métro station Barbara, named in her honour and situated near her gravesite, was opened on 13 January 2022, on a southern extension of Line 4.

== Musical influences ==
Influenced originally by songwriters Mireille and Pierre MacOrlan, she developed her own style and the writing of her own songs transformed her image into that of a unique singer-songwriter. In the 1960s, she wrote her landmark song, "Ma plus belle histoire d'amour c'est vous" ("My Most Beautiful Love Story Is You"), and others for which she remains famous such as "L'aigle noir", "Nantes", "La solitude", "Göttingen" and "Une petite cantate." These five songs plus "Dis, quand reviendras-tu?" were translated into German by Belgian-German singer-songwriter Didier Caesar. The song "Göttingen" (named after the German city of Göttingen) is said to have contributed more to post-war German–French reconciliation than any speech by a politician. On the 40th anniversary of the Elysée agreement, ex-chancellor Gerhard Schröder quoted from the song in his official speech in the Château de Versailles.

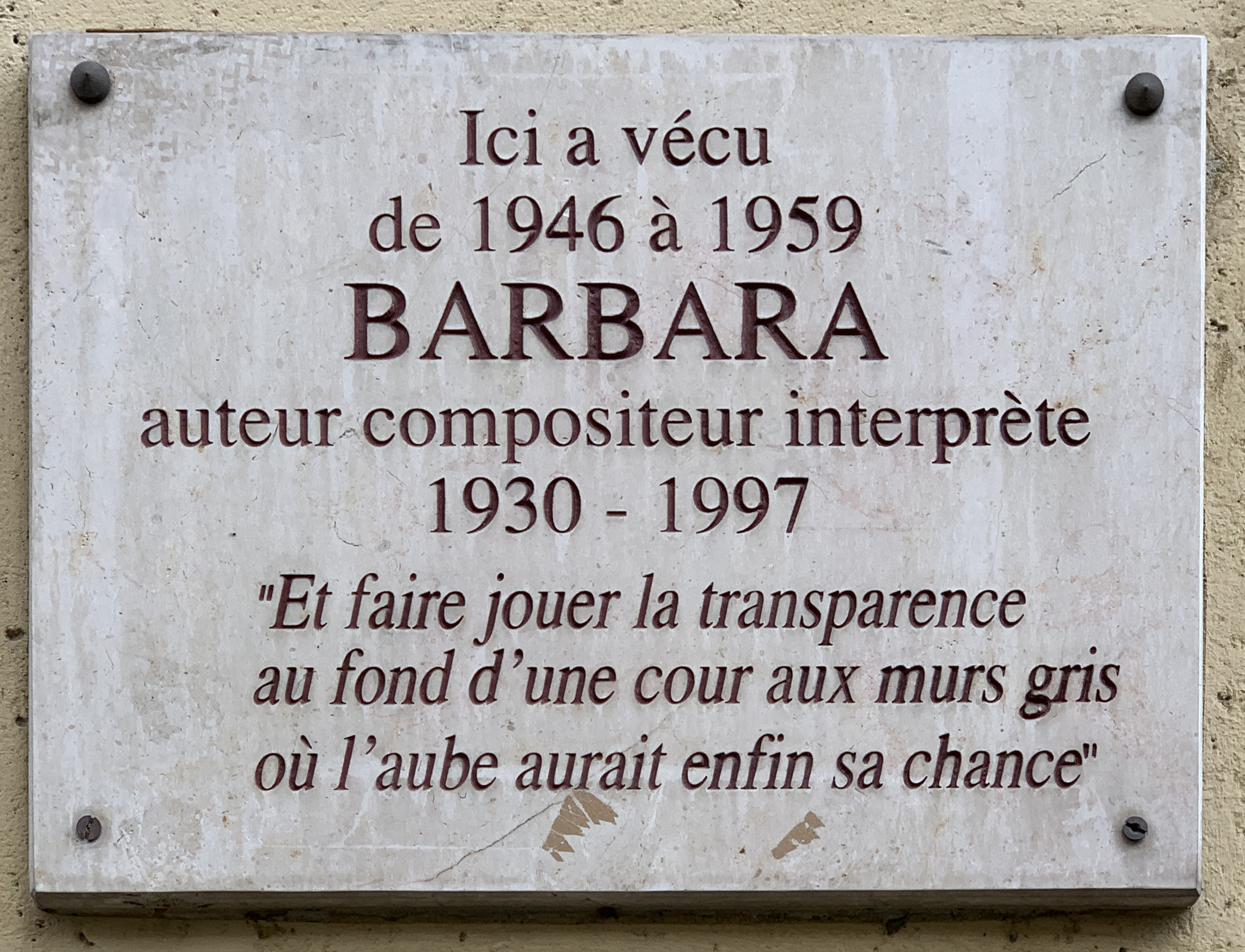
Commemorative plaque, 50 Rue Vitruve, Paris

== Personal life ==
In October 1953, she married Claude John Luc Sluys, a Belgian law student, but they separated in 1956. She wrote many very personal songs, including "Nantes" about her father and "Une petite cantate", which was dedicated to her friend Liliane Benelli, who had died in a car accident earlier in 1965. Later in life, she wrote a song to her public – "Ma plus belle histoire d'amour" – and another about her musicians – "Mes hommes".

== Musical legacy ==
Barbara's musical legacy is revealed in the writing of a number of singers, French-speaking and otherwise. A style referred to as "Nouvelle Chanson", or "New Chanson", artists such as Keren Ann, Benjamin Biolay, Coralie Clement, Emilie Simon, Daphné, Vincent Delerm and Tancrède are often cited as exponents of the updated style. One of the few English-speaking artists to cover her work is Marc Almond, whose version of "Amours Incestueuses" ("Incestuous Loves") was released on his 1993 album "Absinthe". The Anglo-French biographer David Bret, a close friend of Barbara, wrote at her behest "Les Hommes Bafoués", a song about AIDS prejudice. Bret also adapted three of her songs, "Ma Plus Belle Histoire D'Amour", "La Solitude", and "Précy Jardin" into English for Barbara. These were taped in 1992, but so far have never been released. In 1971, the Spanish singer Maria del Mar Bonet recorded a cover of L'Aigle Noir in Catalan which was a success in Spanish-language countries. L'Aigle Noir has also been adapted and sung in Spanish, and Swedish (Rikard Wolff), and many times in Japanese, also with great success.

Well-known contemporary artists such as New York-based Martha Wainwright and Spanish singer-songwriter Conchita Mendivil (who both recently reprised "Dis, Quand Reviendras-tu?",), and London-based singer-songwriter Ana Silvera have reprised songs sung by Barbara.

== Discography ==
=== Albums ===
Philips Records except where noted

- 1959: Barbara à l'Écluse (La Voix de son maître)
- 1960: Barbara chante Brassens (Odeon)
- 1961: Barbara chante Jacques Brel (Odeon)
- 1964: Dis, quand reviendras-tu? (CBS)
- 1964: Barbara chante Barbara
- 1965: Barbara (N°2)
- 1967: Barbara Singt Barbara
- 1967: Barbara (Ma plus belle histoire d'amour)
- 1967: Bobino 1967
- 1968: Le Soleil noir
- 1969: Une soirée avec Barbara
- 1970: Madame
- 1970: L'aigle noir
- 1972: La fleur d'amour
- 1972: Amours incestueuses
- 1973: La Louve
- 1974: Enregistrement public au Théâtre Des Variétés
- 1978: Enregistrement public à L'Olympia (Les insomnies)
- 1981: Seule
- 1981: Récital "Pantin 81"
- 1986: Lily Passion (with Gérard Depardieu)
- 1987: Châtelet 87
- 1994: Châtelet 93
- 1996: Barbara

=== Singles ===
- "L'Aigle noir"
- "Göttingen"
- "Mon enfance"

== Filmography ==
- 1955: Le Toubib, médecin du gang
- 1971: Franz
- 1973: L'Oiseau rare as singer Alexandra Blitz-Balfour
- 1975: Je suis né à Venise by Maurice Béjart

== Sources ==
- Adapted from the article Monique Serf, from Wikinfo, licensed under the GNU Free Documentation License.
