= Langenau =

- Town
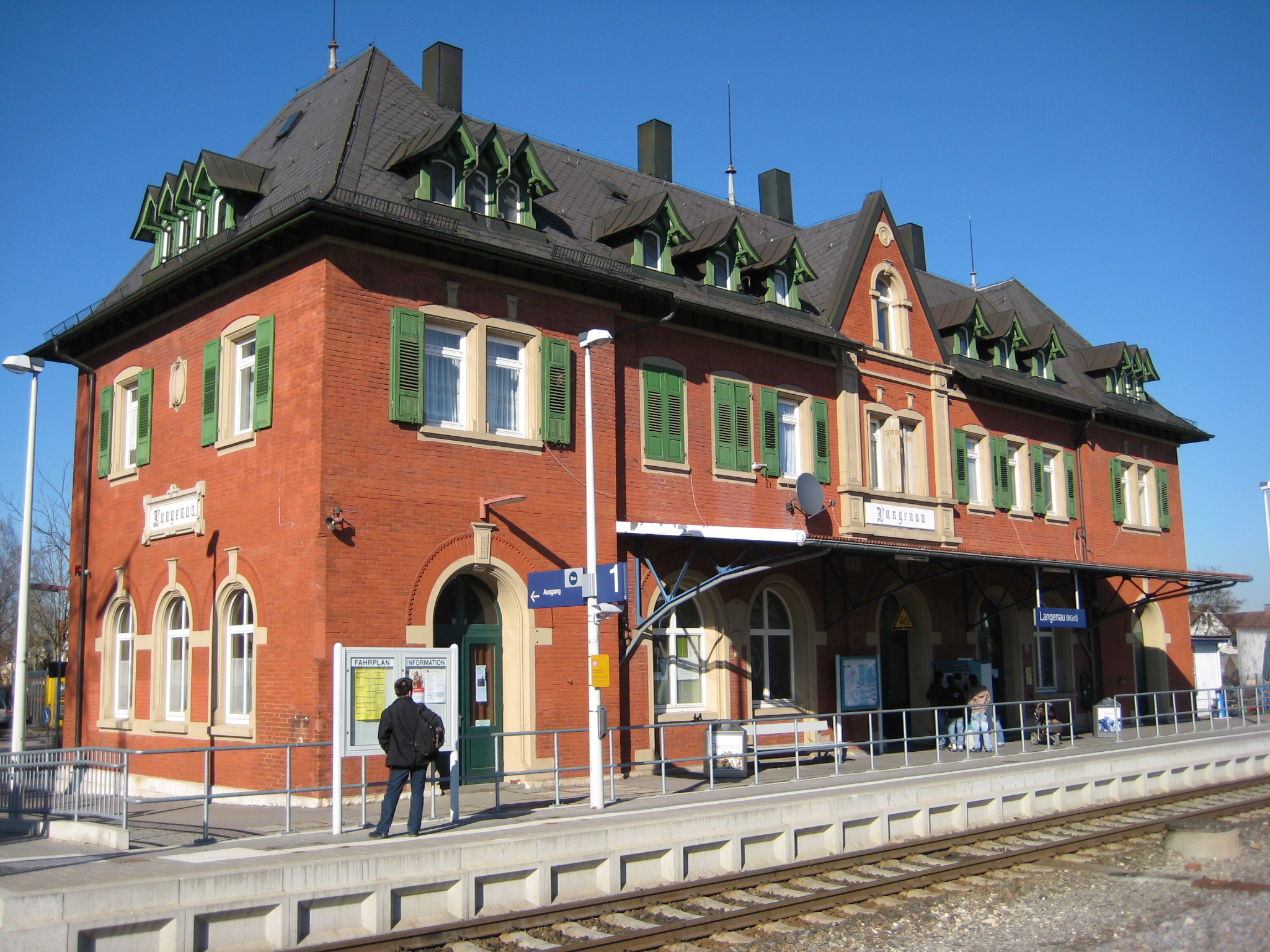
- Train station

- Coat of arms

- Location of Langenau within Alb-Donau-Kreis district
- Interactive map of Langenau
- Location within Germany Location within Baden-Württemberg
- Coordinates: 48°29′48″N 10°7′12″E
- Country: Germany
- State: Baden-Württemberg
- Admin. region: Tübingen
- District: Alb-Donau-Kreis

Government
  - Mayor (2024–32): Daria Henning

Area
  - Total: 75.03 km^{2} (28.97 sq mi)
- Elevation: 458 m (1,503 ft)

Population (2025-12-31)
  - Total: 15,359
  - Density: 204.7/km^{2} (530.2/sq mi)
- Time zone: UTC+01:00 (CET)
  - Summer (DST): UTC+02:00 (CEST)
- Postal codes: 89129
- Dialling codes: 07345
- Vehicle registration: UL
- Website: www.langenau.de

Langenau (German pronunciation: [ˈlaŋənaʊ]) is a town in the district of Alb-Donau in Baden-Württemberg in Germany. It is situated 14 km northeast of Ulm.

== History ==
Today's Langenau was created in 1972 by merging the historical villages of Albeck, Göttingen and Hövelsingen into the village of Langenau. Today, the four villages function as the town's Ortsteile.

=== Religious Buildings ===
The Protestant Martinskirche with Baroque altar comes from the 14th century to 18 century.

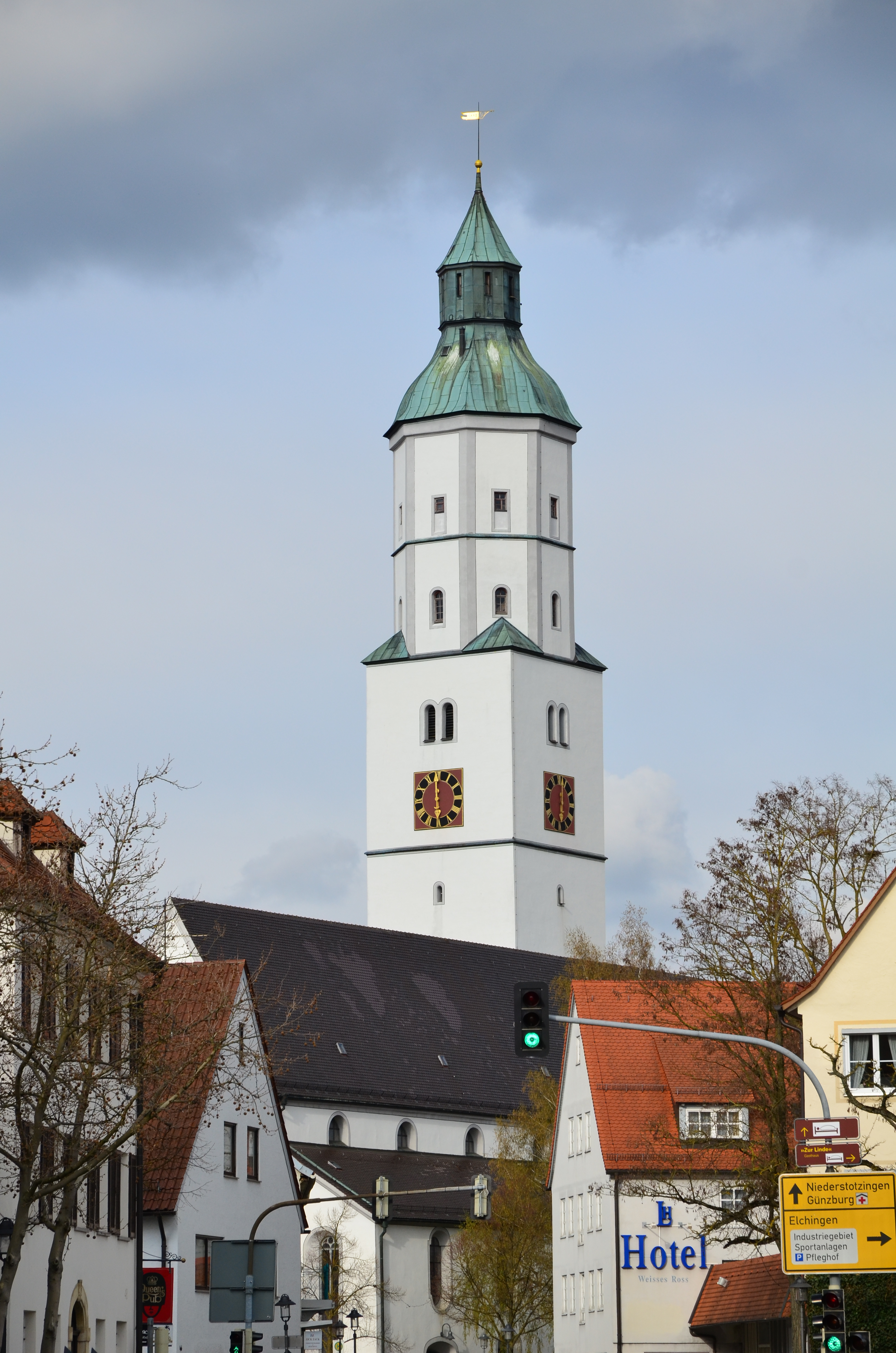
Langenau St. Martin

The likewise Protestant St. Leonhardskirche dates back to the 17th-18th century.

== Statistics ==
As of 31 December 2023, the total population is 16,045, on an area of 7,500 Hectares, and is distributed amongst the four villages as follows:

Village	Population	Area (in ha)
Langenau	12,623	4,757
Albeck	1,484	951
Göttingen	1,210	920
Hörvelsingen	728	870

The population is aged 43.6 years on average and immigrants from other countries make up 16.3 percent of the population.

== Transport ==
Langenau is located directly on the Autobahn A7 and near the A8

Public transport is provided by the Donau-Iller-Nahverkehrsverbund (DING). Langenau is connected to the national rail network via the Brenz Railway (Brenzbahn) from Ulm to Aalen.

== Mayors ==
- -2016: Wolfgang Mangold
- 2016-2024: Daniel Salemi
- since 2024: Daria Henning

== International relations ==
Langenau is twinned with:

- Albeck in Carinthia, Austria, since 1994
- Brand-Erbisdorf, Germany, since 1991
- Bridgend, Wales, since 1972
- Somberek, Hungary, since 1990

== Media ==
The newspaper Südwest-Presse is distributed in Langenau, and includes a weekly local edition "Langenau aktuell" Media Langenau date.

== Education ==
Langenau has three primary schools, a special education school, a Werkrealschule, a Realschule and the Robert Bosch school.

== Parks ==
At Langenau town Wörth is a park with a water wheel, a lake and a playground.

== Celebrations ==
Every year on the last weekend before the summer holidays, the traditional children's festival is held with a parade of schools.

== Notable people ==
- Albrecht Besserer von Thalfingen (1787–1839), the acting Bavarian war minister under Ludwig I of Bavaria 1838/9
- Robert Bosch (1861-1942), founder of the Robert Bosch GmbH, born in Albeck
- Gottlob Honold (1876–1923), engineer and inventor
- Wulf Konold (1946–2010), musicologist, dramaturge and theatre director.
- Hansjörg Schlager (1948–2004), alpine skier
- Thure Riefenstein (born 1965), actor, director, writer and producer.

== See also ==
- There were plans for a federal highway Bundesautobahn 86 with an exit for Langenau until the 1970s.
- The German Armed Forces Military History Research Office was situated there from 1957 to 1958.
