= List of highways numbered 86S =

Highway 86S may refer to:

- SR 86S
- OR 86S

== See also ==
- List of highways numbered 86
- Norinco Type 86S, an assault rifle
