= Gottlob Honold =

German engineer (1876-1923)

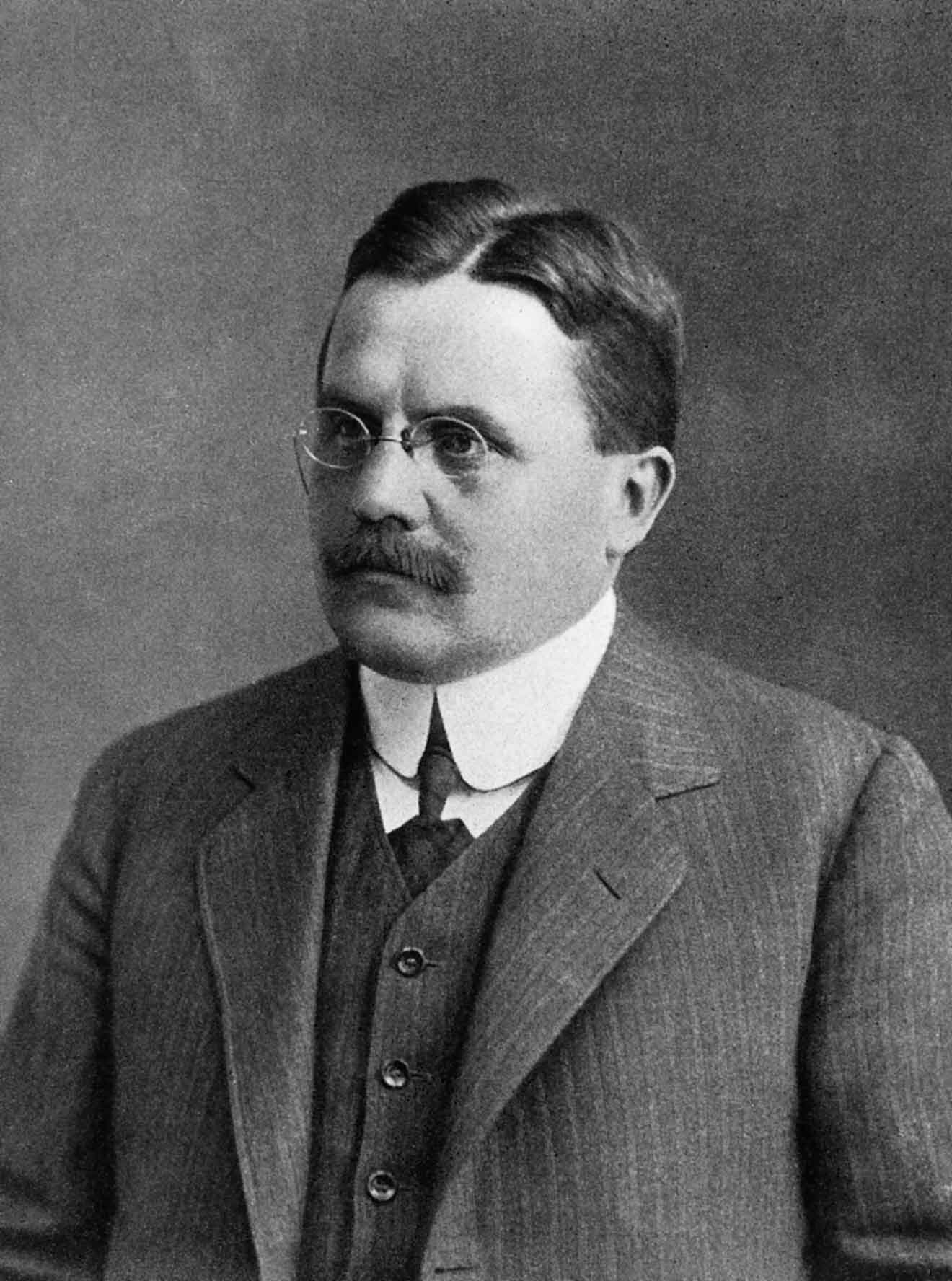
Gottlob Honold 1910

Gottlob Honold (26 August 1876 – 17 March 1923) was a leading engineer in the workshop of Robert Bosch, where he invented a practical ignition magneto, practical automobile headlights, and a practical vehicle horn.

Honold was born on 26 August 1876 in Langenau, in Germany, about 10 miles northeast of Ulm.

Honold's father was a friend of the father of Robert Bosch. In 1891, Honold first worked in Bosch's Stuttgart workshop as an apprentice. Honold then studied engineering at the Technical University of Stuttgart. In 1901, Honold accepted an offer to work for Bosch once again, where he specialized on ignition. His task was to build an apparatus "that would produce a hot spark of relatively long duration (arc) with nonmoving electrodes." By December, collaborating with Arnold Zähringer, Honold had a test model using a common power source for the low and high voltages in a single unit.

Honold also helped develop the automotive headlights that are used today. Although lights had been used to some extent for night driving, the early lanterns did little more than to draw attention to a vehicle, and were of little use for illumination. It was Honold who conceived the idea of placing parabolic metal mirrors behind the lamp to increase the amount of light without taxing the automotive electrical system.

In 1919, Honold also helped develop the Bosch horn for automobiles.

Honold died in Stuttgart on 17 March 1923.

== See also ==
- German inventors and discoverers
