= List of 86 episodes =

Cover art of the first Blu-ray compilation illustrated by Shirabii, featuring Vladilena "Lena" Milizé

86 is an anime series based on the light novel series of the same name written by Asato Asato and illustrated by Shirabii. The series adaptation was announced in a livestream commemorating the first anniversary of Kadokawa's "Kimirano" light novel website on March 15, 2020. It is produced by A-1 Pictures and directed by Toshimasa Ishii, with Toshiya Ōno writing the scripts, Tetsuya Kawakami designing the characters, and Hiroyuki Sawano and Kohta Yamamoto composing the music. The CG is developed by Shirogumi.

The series was originally scheduled to air in 2020, but it was indefinitely delayed. The series is a split-cour anime, with the first half airing on Tokyo MX and other stations from April 11 to June 20, 2021. (Note: The series premiered on April 10, 2021 at 24:00 (effectively, April 11 at 12:00 a.m. JST).) On March 28, 2021, Tokyo MX broadcast a special program commemorating the start of the series starring main cast Shōya Chiba and Ikumi Hasegawa, producer Nobuhiro Nakayama and music composer Hiroyuki Sawano. The second half aired from October 3, 2021, to March 19, 2022. The first opening theme is "3-bun 29-byō" (lit. 3 minutes 29 seconds) by Hitorie, while the first ending theme is "Avid" by SawanoHiroyuki[nZk]:mizuki and the second theme is "Hands Up to the Sky" by SawanoHiroyuki[nZk]:Laco. The second opening theme is "Kyōkaisen" (lit. Boundary Line) by amazarashi, while the third ending theme is "Alchemila" by Regal Lily and the fourth ending theme is "LilaS" by SawanoHiroyuki[nZk]:Honoka Takahashi.

Crunchyroll licensed the series outside of Asia for an English simulcast and simuldub. Muse Communication licensed the series in Southeast Asia and is streaming it on iQIYI and Bilibili.

== Episodes ==
No.	Title (Note: All English titles are taken from Crunchyroll.)	Directed by	Written by	Storyboarded by	Original release date	Ref.
Part 1
1	"Undertaker"; Transliteration: "Andāteikā" (Japanese: アンダーテイカー)	Toshimasa Ishii	Toshiya Ōno	Toshimasa Ishii	April 11, 2021	
The Republic of San Magnolia has been at war with the Empire of Giad for years. However, thanks to both sides using unmanned drones to fight, the Republic boasts that they are fighting an ethical war since no humans are actually being killed. However, in reality, the Republic's Juggernauts are actually secretly being piloted by humans called 86s, from the Republic's unofficial 86th District. Major Vladilena "Lena" Milizé is a Handler, an officer in charge of commanding 86s in battle, though she has a reputation for treating the 86s as humans. One day, Lena is suddenly appointed to be the Handler for the prestigious Spearhead squadron, made up of the most elite 86 pilots. However, the unit's leader, Shinei "Shin" Nouzen, known as the Undertaker, has a reputation for destroying Handlers, as every Handler that has attempted to command him has either requested transfer, retired or even committed suicide. Meanwhile, on the frontlines, the pilots of Spearhead live life as best they can, while taking personal glee at tormenting every Handler sent to them. However, during one battle, one of them is mortally wounded, and Shin lives up to his name by mercy killing him. Later that night, Lena contacts Spearhead and introduces herself to them.
2	"Spearhead"; Transliteration: "Supiaheddo" (Japanese: スピアヘッド)	Kuniyasu Nishina	Toshiya Ōno	Toshimasa Ishii	April 18, 2021	
One week after Lena assumes command of Spearhead, one of the Empire's Legions sends an attack wave towards Spearhead's position, forcing them to mobilize and counterattack. Lena witnesses Shin's battle prowess as he single handedly destroys the Legion's most powerful units. Afterwards, Lena attends a history class for Handler recruits where the teacher explains that since it is believed the Empire was wiped out by their own Legions, and the Legions have a set lifetime, it is predicted that the war will end within two years when the Legions automatically shut down. Lena then takes control of the lecture and reveals to the students that during the war, the Republic revoked all citizenship and human rights of the nation's non-Alba population (people who do not have silver hair and eyes) and forced them to pilot their Juggernauts. Since 86s are no longer considered "human", their losses are no longer considered as fatalities. Lena stresses to the students that 86s are human and should be treated as such. While this angers the government monitors, Lena is confident her uncle can protect her. When speaking with her friend Annette, Lena says she has a positive impression of Shin despite his reputation. That night, Lena continues her daily conversations with Spearhead, and the unit begins warming up to her, especially Shin, who is briefly seen smiling for the first time.
3	"I Don't Want to Die"; Transliteration: "Shinitakunai" (Japanese: 死にたくない)	Ryō Andō	Toshiya Ōno	Ryō Andō	April 25, 2021	
Lena continues her conversations with Spearhead, though some of the members have mixed opinions of her. Kurena has a deep resentment, due to the fact that she is jealous at how close Lena seems to be with Shin, as well as her anger at Alba in general due to her parents having been executed by them. Kaie, meanwhile, has become fascinated with Lena, having learned that not all 86 are good and not all Alba are bad. Meanwhile, Lena works to secure a more accurate map of the battlefield to assist Spearhead. Kaie then asks Lena why she cares so much about 86s and Spearhead, and Lena reveals that while she was on the battlefield, her life was saved by an 86 pilot which made her realize that they are all human. However, Kaie warns Lena not to get too attached to them and recommends she transfer out, otherwise her idealism will come back to haunt her. In the next battle, Lena uses her new maps to help Spearhead set up in superior positions. However, despite the battle being a success, Kaie is apparently killed when her Juggernaut gets bogged down in a marsh and destroyed by an enemy unit. Lena apologizes to Spearhead for Kaie's death and blames herself for not spotting the marsh sooner. This causes one of the pilots, Theoto, to go off on a rant against Lena accusing her of merely pretending to care about 86s while she stays safe in luxury behind the frontlines and is ignorant of how they truly feel about their situation, and finally points out how Lena hasn't bothered to learn any of their real names, instead referring to them only by callsign. Upon hearing all this, Lena begins to suffer an emotional breakdown.
4	"Real Name"; Transliteration: "Hontō no Namae o" (Japanese: 本当の名前を)	Ryō Andō	Toshiya Ōno	Ayako Kōno	May 2, 2021	
Theoto is chastised by Raiden for his rant. Even though they don't disagree with what he has said, they do find issue with how he said it, and they're now convinced Lena will transfer out. Meanwhile, Lena is left to reflect on idealism, especially after talking with her uncle and Annette and realizing how she is still subconsciously prejudiced against the 86s. She privately calls Shin to apologize with how she's acted, and asks him to give her the real names of the Spearhead members. Shin further explains that in his original unit, it was a custom for the longest surviving member to preserve the names and memories of the members killed in action, so they will not be forgotten. Shin has carried this responsibility with him to Spearhead, and has collected 561 names to date. Shin then connects Lena to the rest of Spearhead, where she apologizes to them for making assumptions about them and asks them to tell her their real names, and tells them her name in return. Theo also apologizes to Lena for the way he delivered his rant and while Spearhead ultimately accepts Lena's apology and accepts her as their Handler, they remind Lena that as long as she commands them while safe behind the Republic's walls, they will never view her as a true equal to them. Later that night, Lena calls Shin again, realizing that he never told her his name. When Shin tells Lena his name, she then asks if he knows a man named Shourei Nouzen, and Shin reveals that Shourei is his brother.
5	"I'm With You"; Transliteration: "Watashi mo Issho ni" (Japanese: 私も一緒に)	Satsuki Takahashi	Kurasumi Sunayama	Satsuki Takahashi	May 9, 2021	
Lena tells Shin how Shourei saved her life in a Legion ambush that killed her father, and how he was kind and compassionate and wanted nothing more than to go back home to see Shin again. She also learns that the Nouzen family immigrated to the Republic from the Empire before the war, and possibly lived in the capital of District 1. Just then, Shin warns Lena of a Legion offensive, despite the fact that she hasn't received any notifications from command. Shin also warns Lena to cut her Para-RAID link with him due to the presence of "Black Sheep" in the Legion, but Lena insists on staying connected. However, during the battle, Lena begins to hear voices of people in distress, including Kaie's last words, and goes into shock. Though traumatized by the experience, Lena works up the courage to contact Shin again, and he explains due to a near death experience, he can hear the "voices of the dead" from the Legions, which is how he can predict their movements. Furthermore, the Legions' programming is based on how a human brain works. Because of this, the Legions have been able to copy the brains of the people they have killed on the battlefield, imprinting their victims' last thoughts into their programming and creating "Black Sheep" and "Shepherd" models that have far superior performance and intelligence. The Legion is in fact far larger and more intelligent than the Republic realizes, and has already evolved a method to exceed their original lifespans, meaning the Republic's defeat is inevitable. Hearing all this, Lena resolves to work with Shin to destroy the Legion "Shepherd" commanders within one year to end the war for good. Later that night, it is revealed that Shin bears a scar on his neck from a time where Shourei attempted to strangle him.
6	"Through to the End"; Transliteration: "Saigo Made" (Japanese: 最後まで)	Kuniyasu Nishina	Toshiya Ōno	Kuniyasu Nishina	May 16, 2021	
Four years in the past, a young Shin searches through an old battlefield before finding Shourei's headless corpse. In the present the Legion begins rapidly evolving its tactics to counter Spearhead's ambushes, and Spearhead suffers two casualties, Daiya and Lecca, in their latest battle. Shin is forced to mercy kill Daiya to prevent the Legion from harvesting his brain. It's revealed that Shin is focused on finding Shourei's missing head, and that Shourei attempted to strangle him in the past in a fit of rage, blaming him for the deaths of their parents. Lena celebrates her birthday with Annette and asks her what would happen to anybody with an abnormal reaction to Para-RAID, and Annette explains that an 86 would be dissected for study while a Handler would undergo an examination before being transferred. She then petitions her uncle to provide additional military support to Spearhead and replacements for their losses, but he refuses, instead ordering her and Spearhead to attack a Legion base under construction. Shin agrees to carry out the mission, knowing it is likely a trap. Lena tells Shin more about her memories of Shourei, and quickly comes to realize that she has feelings for Shin.
7	"Will You Remember Me?"; Transliteration: "Wasurenai de Itekuremasu ka?" (Japanese: 忘れないでいてくれますか？)	Tomohiko Itō	Chiaki Nagai	Tomohiko Itō	May 23, 2021	
With the Revolution Festival coming soon, Lena arranges to have a crate of fireworks smuggled to Spearhead. She also continues to advocate for supplies and reinforcements to be sent to Spearhead, and her uncle finally appears to agree. As a new supply shipment is sent to Spearhead, Anju and Kurena privately talk about Daiya's death and how it has affected Anju, and also wonder if they should tell Lena about Spearhead's secret, which even Shin and Raiden do not have the heart to tell her. During the Festival, Lena is forced to attend a party while Spearhead celebrates with the smuggled fireworks. Later, Spearhead prepares for their planned attack on the Legion base, but they are suddenly ambushed by ultra long range artillery fire that inflicts heavy losses, forcing Spearhead to retreat and leaving only a handful of Spearhead members alive. As Lena promises to secure more reinforcements, Shin decides to tell her the truth about Spearhead; it is a suicide unit meant to kill off every 86 who reaches near the end of their term to ensure they can never return to the Republic. Spearhead will only be replenished when every current member is dead. Lena then asks why they still fight if their death is certain, and Raiden explains they all want to keep their pride by going down fighting rather than simply accepting death. Meanwhile, in another sector, a new type of Legion unit completely obliterates a Juggernaut squadron.
8	"Let's Go"; Transliteration: "Ikō" (Japanese: 行こう)	Takashi Yasui	Kurasumi Sunayama	Jong Heo	May 30, 2021	
After retreating back to base, Shin reveals to Raiden that he heard Shourei's voice among the Legion, and he is eager to confront him one final time. Meanwhile, Lena studies Spearhead's history and discovers that numerous previous iterations of the unit had been sent on "special reconnaissance missions" to guarantee their destruction. She goes to Annette to ask for help, which only makes Annette furious as Lena's idealism only reminds her of how she allowed her neighbors, who were friends and 86s, to be taken away by the government. She reveals that their para-RAID technology was developed by performing human experimentation on 86s, and her own father committed suicide from the guilt. Lena and Annette have a falling out and Lena goes to her uncle next to protest Spearhead's upcoming "special reconnaissance mission". However, he explains that the complete extermination of the 86s is necessary, because if the truth of their treatment were ever to get out, the Republic would immediately become a pariah state among foreign nations. Unable to do anything, Lena can only bid Shin farewell. Shin informs Lena that once he destroys Shourei, who is now a Shepherd, that will cause enough confusion among the Legion that she will have a chance to escape the country. On the day of the mission, the last remaining members of Spearhead: Shin, Raiden, Theoto, Kurena, and Anju, clean out their base and head out. Meanwhile, Shourei moves out to intercept them, eager to assimilate Shin into the Legion in a warped desire to protect him.
9	"Goodbye"; Transliteration: "Sayonara" (Japanese: さよなら)	Ryūta Kawahara	Chiaki Nagai	Kengo Matsumoto; Tomohiko Itō	June 6, 2021	
While Spearhead engages the main Legion forces, Shin heads directly for Shourei to battle him one on one. However, Shourei's Shepherd unit proves to be too well armored and advanced for Shin to take on alone, and he is knocked unconscious when his Juggernaut is hit. Meanwhile, Lena approaches Annette again, revealing that she has figured out that Shin and Shourei were the neighbors Annette abandoned. Feeling guilty, Annette agrees to hack the Republic's artillery system to give Lena control of it, and she provides much needed artillery support, destroying the Legion forces and disabling Shourei long enough for Shin to regain consciousness and destroy him. Regaining his sanity, Shourei apologizes to Shin before his machine explodes. With Shourei and the Legion forces in the area destroyed, Spearhead decides to continue pressing forward beyond the Republic's borders to find their freedom. Realizing Spearhead are leaving without her, Lena has no choice but to watch as Spearhead travels out of range of the Para-RAID system and disappear.
10	"Thank You"; Transliteration: "Arigatō" (Japanese: ありがとう)	Satsuki Takahashi	Toshiya Ōno	Hirotaka Mori	June 13, 2021	
Now free from the Republic's control, Spearhead travel deeper into old Empire territory, avoiding Legion patrols until reach a river their Juggernauts cannot cross alone. With their progress stopped, Spearhead are able to take the opportunity to rest and relax and explore a nearby abandoned Imperial town, and they note that Shin seems far more relaxed and easygoing now that he has set Shourei free and been able to confide with Lena about his troubles. The next day, Shin returns to the town to confront a damaged Black Sheep that he was able to hear, and mercy kills it by destroying its core. Afterwards, he tells the rest of Spearhead that he intends to find a foreign nation the Legion hasn't been able to conquer where they can live in peace. Two weeks later, Spearhead's robot companion Fido recalls its memories of being found by Shin and living with Spearhead before it is destroyed in an explosion.
11	"Here We Go"; Transliteration: "Iku yo" (Japanese: 行くよ)	Ryō Andō	Kurasumi Sunayama	Ryō Andō	June 20, 2021	
After a skirmish with the Legion, all but one of Spearhead's Juggernauts are disabled and Fido too crippled to move, forcing Spearhead to leave it behind. In addition, most of their supplies were destroyed, leaving them with limited prospects of traveling any further. With no choice, Spearhead continue on to another abandoned Imperial town, where they spend the night in a school and briefly roleplay being students again. The next day, Shin take the last remaining Juggernaut to intercept the Legion, intending to use himself as a decoy for the rest of Spearhead to escape. However, Shin's friends follow him into battle, and all of them are seemingly killed while Shin hears the voice of another Shepherd. Meanwhile, Lena arrives at Spearhead's base as the replacement Spearhead is transferred in. She explores the base and finds a note left behind by Spearhead expressing their final farewells to her, as well as a request to adopt the kitten they had been keeping as a pet. Inspired by Spearhead's words, Lena resolves to keep fighting and moving forward. Elsewhere, Shin appears to have a dying dream of being reunited with Shourei in the afterlife, leaving his headless body behind.
Part 2
12	"Welcome"; Transliteration: "Yōkoso" (Japanese: ようこそ)	Ryō Andō	Chiaki Nagai	Toshimasa Ishii	October 3, 2021	
Several weeks after Shin and his friends have gone missing, Lena has been demoted from commanding Spearhead and is in charge of conventional 86 unit, led by Cyclops. However, she is still the military's top performing Handler, and she uses her reputation as leverage to secure more resources and benefits for her troops, as well as gain a cadre of officers loyal to her. Meanwhile, Shin wakes up from his dying dream to find him and his friends in the custody of the Federacy of Giad, the successor nation to the Empire of Giad after it was toppled in a rebellion. They are greeted by Ernst Zimerman, the provisional president of the Federacy who reveals that they were rescued from Legion custody and promises they will be treated as guests. After a month of isolation, Ernst grants Shin and his friends Federacy citizenship and allows them to live in his home, where they are introduced to Frederica Rosenfort, a young girl in his care. After a brief introduction and dinner, Shin and his friends decide to go to bed. Ernst begins to wonder whether he's doing the right thing, and it's revealed Frederica is actually the Empress of the former Giad Empire. In his room, Shin is troubled when Ernst returns the tag he had carved in Shourei's memory.
13	"It's Too Late"; Transliteration: "Imasara Sonna Koto" (Japanese: 今更そんなこと)	Takaaki Ishiyama	Toshiya Ōno	Kuniyasu Nishina	October 10, 2021	
One month after they become Federacy citizens, Shin and his friends have been doing their best to adjust to civilian life within the Federacy. They do find that the Federacy is a much better country than the Republic, as they are treated as equals and not discriminated against. However, despite making friends and enjoying the luxuries the Federacy can provide, they cannot shake the feeling that they don't belong there, as their lingering guilt and trauma over their lost comrades leads them to believe they should keep fighting on the battlefield until the end. On the Eve of the Holy Birth, Shin and his friends finally come to the conclusion that they will return to the battlefield, much to Ernst's shock. He tries to convince them otherwise, but Frederica warns him that trying to override their personal decision would make him no different from the Republic. Ernst relents, but only on the condition that they all enroll in the Special Officer's Training School and become officers. Frederica also requests to go with them, revealing her true identity as Augusta Fredrica Adel-Adler, the last Empress of Giad. She also reveals that her royal blood gives her the power to view the past and present of the people she meets, and she saw how Shin defeated and freed Shourei from the Legion. She asks Shin to help her free her knight, Kiriya, who has also been turned into a Legion Shepherd. Shin agrees, and he, his friends, and Frederica depart for officer training.
14	"Glad to Be Here"; Transliteration: "Yoroshiku" (Japanese: よろしく)	Satsuki Takahashi	Kurasumi Sunayama	Satsuki Takahashi	October 17, 2021	
Thanks to their experience, Shin and his friends manage to pass officer training and are assigned to the Nordlicht Squadron under the command of Lt. Colonel Grethe Wenzel. Grethe takes Shin and his friends to a location recently reclaimed by the Federacy, where they have recovered their wrecked Juggernauts and erected a memorial dedicated to all of the names Shin had gathered. Grethe also reveals that when they recovered Fido's wreckage, they found its core still intact so they built it a new body. Frederica joins the unit as well as their official mascot, and she returns Shin's handgun to him. Shin and Nordlicht soon begin assisting the Federacy forces by piloting the Reginleif mechs, based on the Juggernaut design. During the fighting, Shin reunites with Eugene, another Federacy officer who he befriended before signing up who joined the army to make a better life for his sister. However, after a Legion attack, Shin comes across a mortally wounded Eugene and is forced to mercy kill him. Afterwards, Shin receives word that the battle is going poorly and to prepare for yet another Legion attack.
15	"Welcome Back"; Transliteration: "Okaerinasai" (Japanese: おかえりなさい)	Ryūta Kawahara	Toshiya Ōno	Tomohiko Itō	October 24, 2021	
With Federacy analysts predicting a massive Legion offensive, the Federacy military decides to reorganize its forces in order to prepare for the attack. Grethe takes the opportunity to reunite Shin and Nordlicht Squadron, who had been previously split up to assist other units. Grethe briefs Nordlicht about the coming Legion attack, as well as the discovery of several surviving countries, but they still haven't gotten any response from the Republic. Shin submits his comments about the Reginleif's performance as well his own warning of the Legion attack, though Grethe is skeptical about the number of Legion he is describing. Frederica visits Shin and tells him more about Kiriya, who was part of the Nouzen clan and is Shin's distant relative. She reveals that after the Empire declared war on its neighbors, the people rebelled against the royal family. Since the Legions were not designed to combat domestic rebellion, the royal family was forced to rely on their personal guard, and Kiriya eventually went insane trying to fight off the rebel army. Eventually, Ernst was able to capture Frederica and faked her death. Believing Frederica was dead, Kiriya allowed himself to be taken by the Legion. Frederica then cautions Shin that he should seriously think about his future, which reminds him of Lena. Meanwhile, in the Republic, Lena continues preparing for the Legion attack, who are closing in to the Republic's borders.
16	"Even So"; Transliteration: "Sore de mo" (Japanese: それでも)	Ryō Andō	Chiaki Nagai	Ryō Andō	October 31, 2021	
The Legion begins a simultaneous offensive against the Federacy, Republic, and other allied nations with massive numbers never seen before. The Federacy's defense lines come close to being overrun, but a quick deployment and counterattack by Nordlicht squadron manages to slow them down long enough for Federacy lines to reinforce and stabilize. Shin then goes on the offensive against the Legion, destroying countless Legion units on his own. Frederica has a vision and witnesses Shin taking pleasure in the fighting, reminding her of Kiri's fall to madness. She also witnesses the Republic's defenses collapsing under a major Legion assault. Eventually, the Legion withdraws from the Federacy and Frederica warns Shin about his similarity to Kiri. Meanwhile, in the Republic, word of the Legion breakthrough reaches HQ, so Lena's uncle agrees to try and hold off the Legion long enough for Lena to rally the 86s to close the breach. Using an upgraded Para-RAID, Lena connects herself to every 86 pilot simultaneously. Back in the Federacy, Frederica informs Shin and his friends about the dire state the Republic is in when both Shin and Frederica sense Kiri is about to bombard their base.
17	"I Won't Forget"; Transliteration: "Wasuremasen" (Japanese: 忘れません)	Toshihiro Maeya	Toshiya Ōno	Kyōhei Ishiguro	November 7, 2021	
In the Republic, Lena organizes a desperate last stand against the invading Legion. In the Federacy, Shin, his friends, and Frederica manage to survive the bombardment, but it is revealed that the Legion used a massive railgun codenamed "Morpho" to bombard all of the Federacy's forward bases, inflicting significant losses. While Morpho was damaged by a cruise missile attack, military analysts predict it will be able to move into range of any allied capital city once it is repaired. With few options due to Morpho's extreme range, the Federacy decides to send Nordlicht on a deep strike mission to destroy the railgun. While Grethe is furious the military is sending Shin and his friends on what is expected to be a suicide mission, none of them object since they'd rather go down fighting the Legion rather than run away from the war like the Republic did. Meanwhile, Shin's friends are worried about his mental state after he received a letter from Eugene's sister angrily demanding to know why he killed her brother and the possibility of Lena being dead. A week after the Legion invaded, the Republic's capital and Lena's home are shown to be in ruins.
18	"The Truth Is"; Transliteration: "Hontō wa" (Japanese: 本当は)	Yoshinobu Tokumoto	Kurasumi Sunayama	Kagetsu Aizawa	November 21, 2021	
As Nordlicht prepares for their mission, Grethe successfully petitions to allow the use of the prototype ground effect airplane "Nachzehrer" to be used as the unit's transport, rather than relying on much slower and more vulnerable helicopters. Grethe also volunteers to be the Nachzehrer's pilot, being the last remaining person with any experience flying it. Frederica unsuccessfully tries to convince Shin not to go on the mission, fearing that he will die or become a monster like Kiriya. Zimerman, powerless to stop the operation, expresses his wish to see that Shin and his friends return home alive no matter the cost, and privately swears to himself he will destroy the world if they don't. The Federacy and its allies then commence an all-out assault on the Legion as a distraction, opening a hole in the Legion's defensive perimeter allowing the Nachzehrer to launch and head for the Morpho. During the flight, Shin hears the Black Sheep's voices and smiles.
19	"Stay This Way Forever"; Transliteration: "Isso Kono Mama" (Japanese: いっそ このまま)	Ryūta Kawahara	Chiaki Nagai	Ryūta Kawahara	December 5, 2021	
As the Nachzehrer nears the Morpho, it comes under anti-air attack, forcing Nordlicht to airdrop while the Nachzehrer pulls away to distract the Legion's air defenses. Nordlicht then fights its way through the Legion defenders and approaches the Morpho, only for Shin to realize at the last second that the damaged Morpho is bait to lure them into the range of a second Morpho gun controlled directly by Kiriya. Nordlicht is narrowly able to avoid the Morpho's shot and retaliate. Shin falls back into his battle lust, and is only knocked out of it when Kurena is forced to fire on him. With the element of surprise lost, Kiriya is ordered by his superior "No-Face" to withdraw. Shin and his friends decide to pursue Kiriya while the rest of Nordlicht stays behind to hold back the Legion reinforcements. Meanwhile, as the main Federacy force advances, they manage to recover Grethe and the Nordlicht survivors, but cannot provide any support to Shin. As Shin and his friends take a break, they discover that Frederica has stowed away in Fido's cargo trailer. While they are angry at her coming along with them, they have no choice but to bring her along with their pursuit of Kiriya.
20	"Together Unto Death"; Transliteration: "Shinu Made Issho ni" (Japanese: 死ぬまで一緒に)	Haru Shinomiya	Toshiya Ōno	Tomohiko Itō	December 19, 2021	
Shin and his friends continue their pursuit of Morpho with Frederica in tow. Meanwhile, the Federacy and its allies begin staging diversionary attacks on the Legion to draw their attention away from Shin. Grethe returns to the frontlines with the rest of Nordlicht, now freshly resupplied and ready to support Shin. In Legion territory, Raiden confronts Shin over his recent behavior during battles, warning him that such a dangerous fighting style puts them all at risk. He reminds Shin that they are still a unit, and his friends will be there to support him so he doesn't need to keep fighting alone. As the team continues to chase Morpho, Frederica asks everybody about the ocean and they all promise to go see the ocean together after the war. That night, Frederica meets with Shin and confides that like him, she fears losing her sense of purpose, and she deluded herself into thinking that she needed to put Kiriya to rest. She tells Shin that he shouldn't be afraid of the uncertainty of the future as long as he has his friends. However, Shin reveals that ever since his near death experience at the hands of Shourei, he has been unable to feel any desires, and thus doesn't feel he is even alive. Elsewhere, No-Face warns Kiriya that enemy forces are tracking him and instructs him to deal with the matter.
21	"All That's Left"; Transliteration: "Mō Kore Shika" (Japanese: もうこれしか)	Ryō Andō	Kurasumi Sunayama	Ryō Andō	December 26, 2021	
Shin and his friends continue their pursuit of Morpho, but are continually hampered by Legion reinforcements. Anju, Theoto, and Kurena elect to stay behind to delay the Legion or provide long-range support, while Raiden is wounded protecting Frederica. Shin orders Frederica to stay with Fido while he confronts Kiriya alone. Shin manages to hold his own against Kiriya, but his cannon is damaged, leaving him with only a single shot, and Morpho's capabilities make it so Shin has trouble getting into close range with Kiriya. However, Shin is assisted by long-range artillery fire from an unknown source (implied to be provided by Lena), damaging the Morpho and distracting Kiriya. Kiriya is further distracted when Frederica arrives on the battlefield, begging him to stop. Kiriya however is still too consumed with rage, so Frederica points a gun at herself. Shocked, Kiriya moves to stop Frederica, giving Shin the opening he needs to get into point-blank range of the Morpho and destroy Kiriya's core. Frederica then has a vision of Kiriya entrusting her care to Shin before being escorted to the afterlife by Shourei. Back in reality, Kiriya's death causes Morpho's self destruct to activate and it explodes with both Shin and Frederica still in the blast radius.
22	"Shin" (Japanese: シン)	Toshimasa Ishii	Toshiya Ōno	Toshimasa Ishii	March 12, 2022 (Note: This episode aired at 11:30 p.m. JST, 30 minutes before the original air time.)	
Shin is blown clear of the blast and falls unconscious, where he has a vivid nightmare where he tries to grapple with his loss of purpose and survivor's guilt. When he regains consciousness, he sees a Legion unit approaching him with the intent to harvest his brain, but he is saved when Lena intervenes. Unaware that she is speaking with Shin, Lena asks Shin what he is doing in Republic territory. Shin decides not to divulge his identity to Lena despite recognizing her. He then asks Lena what motivates her to stay in the Republic and continue fighting, and she explains that her experiences with Spearhead inspired her, and she wants to survive so she can catch up to Shin and the others. Before Shin can exit his Reginleif and meet her properly, Federacy reinforcements finally arrive, revealing that Shin's friends and Frederica managed to survive. Lena is escorted back to the Republic, with Ernst stating that the Federacy and its allies will organize a rescue mission to help any survivors. Frederica points out that upon meeting Lena again, Shin has now found a reason to keep on living. Later, at a debriefing, Grethe embarrasses Shin by replaying his emotional conversation with Lena, which was recorded. Shin's friends are glad both he and Lena have survived, and express a newfound respect for Lena knowing that she hasn't given up.
23	"Handler One"; Transliteration: "Handorā Wan" (Japanese: ハンドラー・ワン)	Ryūta Kawahara; Toshimasa Ishii	Toshiya Ōno	Tomohiko Itō; Toshimasa Ishii	March 19, 2022	
Shin and his friends and Frederica return to Ernst's home to celebrate their second Night of the Holy Birth holiday, where they take the chance to indulge in their hobbies. Shin visits Eugene's grave and apologizes for being unable to save him, but tells him he has a newfound purpose to live and promises to return to tell him about the things he's seen. Later, he bumps into Marcel who apologizes for blaming him for Eugene's death and Shin leaves Frederica's photo of him and Eugene as an apology for Nina. After Shin and his friends return to the military, they are assigned to the newly established Independent Mobile Force which will take on specialized missions against the Legion and be led by a foreign officer. Shin then visits the Federacy memorial to the 86s and leaves behind Shourei's tag, showing he has accepted and moved on from his death, now focused on destroying the Legion so he can make a better future for his friends. Meanwhile, in the Republic, Republic forces are able to retake District One with the Federacy's help. The 86s are given the opportunity to emigrate to the Federacy and become citizens, and Lena and Annette decide to transfer to the Federacy to continue the fight against the Legion. While many Republic citizens are still prejudiced against non-Alba, Lena is happy to see that many more Republic citizens have had a change of heart. Upon arriving in the Federacy, Lena is introduced to the members of the Independent Mobile Force she now leads, and is shocked and happy to finally learn that Shin and his friends are still alive. Now that they are reunited, Lena promises to fight the Legion side by side with Shin.

== Recap specials ==
No.	Title	Original release date	Ref.
11.5	"The Poppies Bloom Red on the Battlefield"; Transliteration: "Sen'ya ni Akaku Hinageshi no Saku" (Japanese: 戦野に紅く雛罌粟の咲く)	June 27, 2021	
A recap special of part 1.
17.5	"Visual Commentary Special Episode"; Transliteration: "Bijuaru Komentarī Tokuban" (Japanese: ビジュアルコメンタリー特番)	November 14, 2021	
A recap special of part 2's first six episodes with visual discussion comments by voice actors Shōya Chiba (Shinei Nouzen), Seiichirō Yamashita (Raiden Shuga) and Misaki Kuno (Frederica Rosenfort), along with merchandise promotion.
18.5	"If There's Something Worth Dying For"; Transliteration: "Shishite Kai Aru Mono Nareba" (Japanese: 死して甲斐あるものなれば)	November 28, 2021	
A recap special of part 2's first seven episodes.
21.5	"At Least as a Human"; Transliteration: "Semete Ningen Taranto" (Japanese: せめて人間たらんと)	March 5, 2022	
A recap special of part 2's episodes 7 through 10.

== Home media release ==
=== Japanese ===
Volume	Episodes	Release date	Ref.
1	1–2	July 28, 2021	
2	3–5	August 25, 2021	
3	6–8	September 29, 2021	
4	9–11	October 27, 2021	
5	12–14	January 26, 2022	
6	15–17	February 23, 2022	
7	18–20	March 23, 2022	
8	21–23	April 27, 2022	

=== English ===
Volume	Episodes	Release date	Ref.
Complete Series	1–23	November 5, 2024	
