= AH86 =

Road in Turkey

Asian Highway 86 (AH86) is a road in the Asian Highway Network running 247 km (154 miles) from Aşkale to Trabzon, Turkey. The route is concurrent with European route E97. The route is as follows:

== Turkey ==
- D.915 Road D915: Aşkale - Bayburt
- D.050 Road D050: Bayburt - Gümüşhane
- D.885 Road D885: Gümüşhane - Trabzon

== Lack of signage ==
Asian routes are not signposted in Turkey.
