= 86th Street =

86th Street may refer to the following places in the United States:

- 86th Street (Manhattan)
- 86th Street station (IRT Broadway–Seventh Avenue Line) in Manhattan
- 86th Street station (IND Eighth Avenue Line) in Manhattan
- 86th Street station (BMT Fourth Avenue Line) in Brooklyn
- 86th Street station (IRT Lexington Avenue Line) in Manhattan
- 86th Street station (BMT Sea Beach Line) in Brooklyn
- 86th Street station (Second Avenue Subway) in Manhattan
- 86th Street station (IRT Second Avenue Line) in Manhattan (demolished)
- 86th Street station (IRT Ninth Avenue Line) in Manhattan (demolished)
- 86th Street station (New York Central Railroad)
