= 86 (film festival) =

International festival of film and urbanism held in Slavutych, Ukraine (2014–2018)

86 was an annual film and urbanism festival in Slavutych. It was held for 5 years from 2014 to 2018.

== History ==
The festival was founded in 2014 by Ilya Gladshtein and Nadia Parfan. The festival's film program specializes in documentary films on urbanism, energy, and ecology. In addition to the film program, other events are held in Slavutych as part of the festival.

Ilya Gladshtein talks about the idea of the festival:

Film festivals are what we do best. We became interested in making an international cultural event in a small town, away from capitals and large centers, where anything small gets lost in the flow of people and news.

In 2019, the film festival was canceled by the organizers due to a scandal when they received funding from the Ministry of Culture.

== Festival programme ==
- Program of feature films
- "Palm of the North"
- "The Game of Cities"
- "My Street Films Ukraine"

The Palm of the North National Documentary Competition has been held at the festival since 2016.

== Winners ==
=== 2015 ===
- Winner of the MyStreetFilms competition – My Crystal, directed by Oksana Kazmina
- Winner of the MyStreetFilms competition – In the East, dir. by Piotr Armianowski

=== 2016 ===
- Grand Prix "Palm of the North" – Tsvetaeva and Mayakovsky, dir. Polina Moshenska
- Special Mention – To School, dir. Natalia Shevchenko
- Special Mention – Truce, dir. by Valeriy Puzik
- Audience Award – Wonderland, dir. Anatoliy Ulyanov, Natasha Masharova

=== 2017 ===
- Palm of the North Grand Prix – Who are you. Who am I. From a scientific point of view, dir. by Anya Kalinichenko
- Audience Award – Who are you. Who am I. From a scientific point of view, dir. by Anya Kalinichenko
- Winner of the MyStreetFilms-Borderline competition – Ma, dir. by Maria Stoyanova
- Special prize of the MyStreetFilms-BORDER competition – The Miner, dir. by Maria Voronchuk
