= Göttingen (Langenau) =

- Village of Langenau
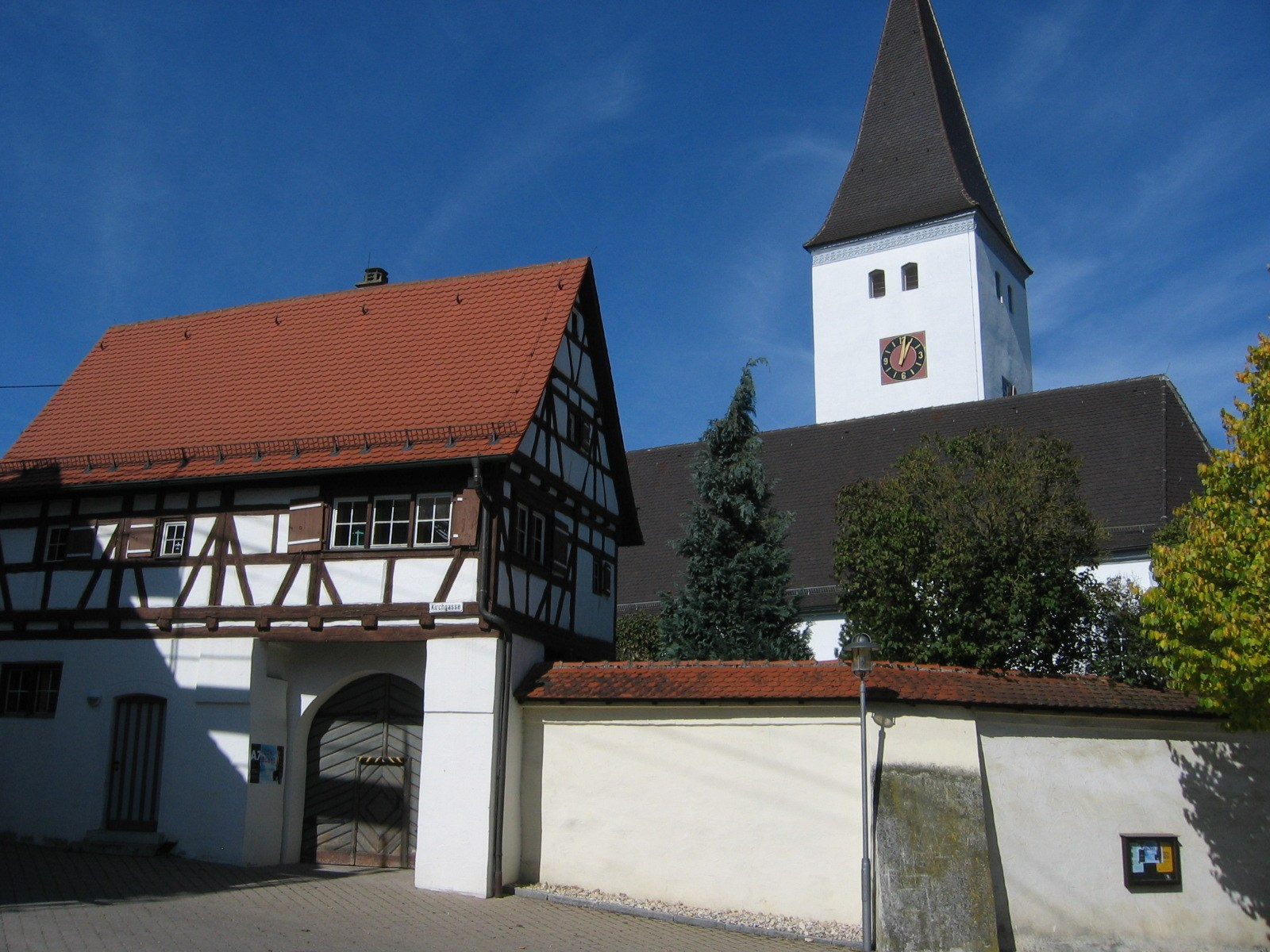
- Historic heart of the village

- Coat of arms
- Interactive map of Göttingen
- Location within Germany Location within Baden-Württemberg
- Coordinates: 48°29′48″N 10°7′12″E
- Country: Germany
- State: Baden-Württemberg
- Admin. region: Tübingen
- District: Alb-Donau-Kreis
- Town: Langenau
- Elevation: 492 m (1,614 ft)

Population (2019-12-31)
  - Total: 1,171
- Time zone: UTC+01:00 (CET)
  - Summer (DST): UTC+02:00 (CEST)
- Postal codes: 89129
- Dialling codes: (+49) (0)7345
- Vehicle registration: UL
- Website: www.langenau.de/de/Leben/Unsere-Stadt/Goettingen (in German)

Göttingen is a village in the town of Langenau in the southern German state of Baden-Württemberg. The current population of Göttingen is 1171, as of December 2019.

== History ==
The settlement of 'Gotingen' presumably developed as an Alemannic ancient village in the 6th/7th century. Göttingen, as a 'modern' village, was first mentioned in the directory of the nearby Elchingen Abbey in 1225.

On 1 April 1972, the village of Göttingen was incorporated into the neighbouring town of Langenau.

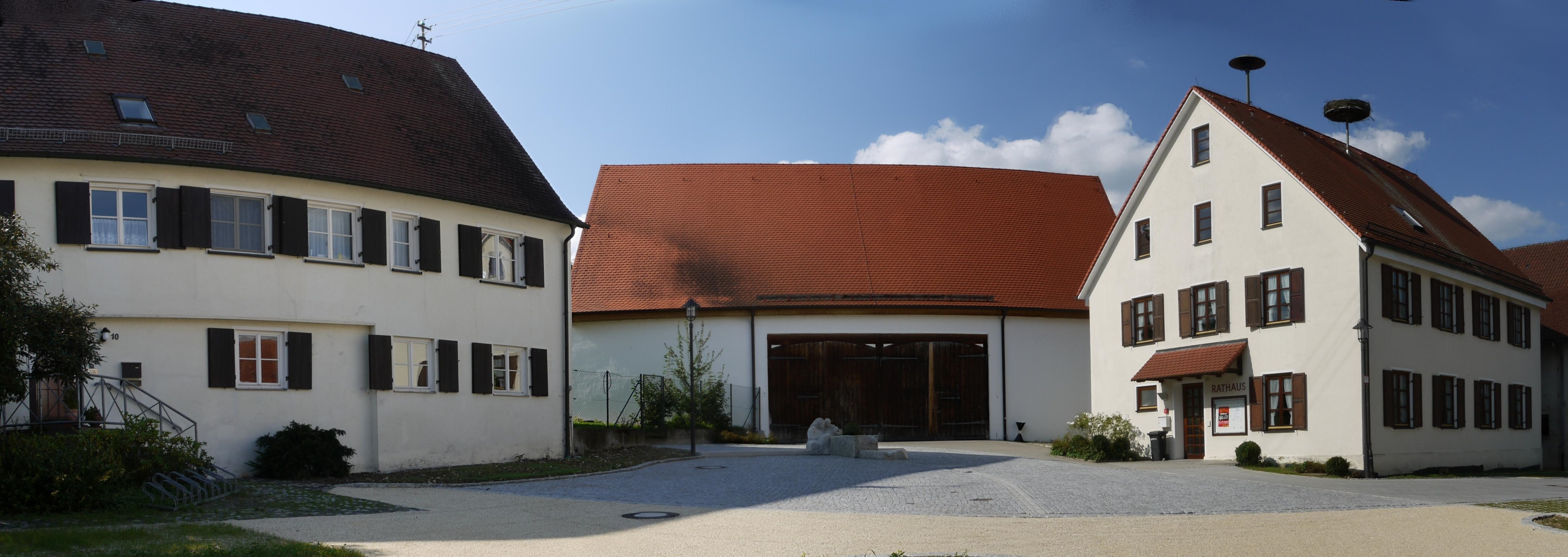
The Lutheran parsonage (left), the multi-purpose barn (centre) and the town hall (right) of Göttingen

=== Religion ===
Göttingen is home to a Protestant Lutheran church (St. Justina, mistakenly also known as 'Martinskirche') and a Roman Catholic church (Martinskirche, dedicated to St. Martin).

== Geography ==
The village is situated in the historic region of Swabia in southern Germany, on the southeastern edge of the Swabian Jura. Göttingen is located in the eastern part of the state of Baden-Württemberg, approximately 14 km (9 miles) northeast of Ulm. The village is bordered by Elchingen in the south and hence also shares a border with the German state of Bavaria. Göttingen is also bordered by Langenau in the east, and Albeck in the north and west of its boundaries.

Surrounded by the Autobahn 8 (Munich – Stuttgart) in the south and the Autobahn 7 in the east, Göttingen is conveniently connected to the national Autobahn system.

== Notable people ==
- Ulrich Kundig (1444), clergyman in Göttingen and abbot (1456-1475) at the Benedictine Abbey of Blaubeuren
- Samuel Baur (1768–1832), Lutheran clergyman and littérateur
- Urs Käufer (*1984), rower and Olympian athlete at the 2008 and 2012 Summer Olympics, has lived in Göttingen

== Literature ==
- Günther Grässel: Göttinger Dorfgeschichte(n). C. Maurer Druck und Verlag GmbH & Co. KG, Geislingen 2013, ISBN 978-3-00-043963-6 (in German)
