= Bundesautobahn 86 =

Federal motorway in Germany

A 86
- Bundesautobahn 86

Route information
- Existed: 1975–1980

Major junctions
- From: Freiburg im Breisgau
- To: Langenau

Location
- Country: Germany
- States: Baden-Württemberg

Highway system
- Roads in Germany; Autobahns; List; Federal; List; State; E-roads

Bundesautobahn 86 (translates from German as Federal Motorway 86, short form Autobahn 86, abbreviated as BAB 86 or A 86) was a planned autobahn in Germany. It was supposed to connect Breisach via Freiburg im Breisgau - Titisee - Donaueschingen - Tuttlingen - Riedlingen - Ulm to Langenau. Part of it has been built as the A 864.

The construction of the Autobahn stopped.
