= Göttingen (song) =

Popular French song

"Göttingen" is a song written and recorded as a single in 1964 by French singer Barbara, who later also recorded a German language version. The song, which appeared on Barbara's album Le Mal de vivre, has been credited with having contributed to improved relations between France and Germany in the years after the Second World War.

As a Jewish child, Barbara had been a fugitive in German-occupied France during the war, but in 1964 she accepted an invitation from the University of Göttingen to perform, and composed the song in honour of the town's charms.

German Chancellor Gerhard Schröder, who had been a student in Göttingen at the time of the song's release, quoted the lyrics in a speech celebrating the 40th anniversary of the Élysée Treaty as having had a major influence on him. The song was subsequently used by ARTE in its programme recognising the 45th anniversary. The French and German versions of the song, which she called "a hymn to Franco-German reconciliation", both appeared on Barbara's 1997 compilation album.

== Other versions ==
Swedish singer-songwriter Barbro Hörberg recorded her own Swedish translation called "Sommarö" ("Summer island") for her album "Med ögon känsliga för grönt" in 1973.
