= A86 =

A86 or A-86 may refer to:

- A86 (software), an assembler for x86 architecture microprocessors
- A86 motorway (France), a beltway in the region of Paris
- A86 road, a major road in Scotland
- Dutch Defence, in the Encyclopaedia of Chess Openings
- LOHAS Park station, a station of Hong Kong MTR
