= 86th Brigade =

86th Brigade may refer to:

== Bangladesh ==
- 86th Independent Signals Brigade

== Russia/Soviet Union ==
- 86th Anti-Aircraft Rocket Brigade

== Spain ==
- 86th Mixed Brigade, a unit of the Spanish Republican Army

== United Kingdom ==
- 86th Brigade (United Kingdom)
- 86th Brigade, Royal Field Artillery, a British Army unit during World War I
- 86th (East Anglian) (Hertfordshire Yeomanry) Brigade, Royal Field Artillery, a British Army unit after World War I

== United States ==
- 86th Infantry Brigade Combat Team, a unit of the United States Army

== See also ==
- 86th Division (disambiguation)
- 86th Wing (disambiguation)
- 86th Regiment (disambiguation)
