= 86th Regiment =

86th Regiment may refer to:

- 86th Regiment of Foot (Rutland Regiment), a unit of the British Army
- 86th (Royal County Down) Regiment of Foot, a unit of the British Army
- 86th (Cornwall) Medium Regiment, Royal Artillery, air defence unit of the British Territorial Army
- 86th (East Anglian) (Hertfordshire Yeomanry) Field Regiment, Royal Artillery, British Yeomanry unit
- 86th (Honourable Artillery Company) Heavy Anti-Aircraft Regiment, Royal Artillery, a unit of the British Territorial Army
- 86th Field Artillery Regiment, a unit of the United States Army
- 86th Infantry Regiment, a unit of the United States Army
- 86th Armoured Regiment (India), an armoured unit of the Indian Army
- 86th Guards Fighter Aviation Regiment, aviation regiment of the Soviet Air Forces

American Civil War

- 86th Illinois Volunteer Infantry Regiment, a unit of the Union (Northern) Army
- 86th Indiana Infantry Regiment, a unit of the Union (Northern) Army
- 86th New York Volunteer Infantry, a unit of the Union (Northern) Army
- 86th Ohio Infantry, a unit of the Union (Northern) Army

== See also ==
- 86th Division (disambiguation)
- 86th Brigade (disambiguation)
