= 86th Division =

86th Division or 86th Infantry Division may refer to:

== Infantry divisions ==
- 86th Division (1st Formation) (People's Republic of China), 1949–1951
- 86th Motorized Infantry Division, People's Republic of China
- 86th Infantry Division (German Empire)
- 86th Infantry Division (Wehrmacht), Germany
- 86th Division (Imperial Japanese Army)
- 86th Guards Rifle Division, Soviet Union
- 86th Rifle Division, Soviet Union
- 86th Division (Syria)
- 86th Infantry Division (United States)

== Artillery divisions ==
- 86th Anti-Aircraft Artillery Division, Soviet Union

== Aviation divisions ==
- 86th Air Division, United States Air Force

== See also ==
- List of military divisions by number
- 86th Brigade (disambiguation)
- 86th Regiment (disambiguation)
- 86th Wing (disambiguation)
