= Kaveh =

Kaveh may refer to:

== Mythology ==
- Kaveh (Finnish mythology), or Kave, a female spirit or goddess
- Kaveh the Blacksmith, a figure in Iranian mythology

== Places in Iran ==
=== Isfahan province ===
- Kave Terminal, a bus terminal in Isfahan
- Kaveh Ahangar Rural District, a Dehestan
- Kaveh Boulevard, a boulevard in Northern Isfahan
- Kaveh Metro Station (Isfahan)
- Mashhad-e Kaveh, a village

=== Lorestan province ===
- Kaveh Kali, a village
- Kaveh-ye Olya, a village
- Kaveh-ye Olya (Deh Sefid), a village
- Kaveh-ye Sofla, a village
- Kaveh-ye Vosta, a village

=== Other provinces ===
- Chahār Kāveh, or Chahar Gaveh, a village in Khuzestan province
- Kāveh Bādām, or Taveh Badom, a village in Kohgiluyeh and Boyer-Ahmad province
- Kaveh Industrial City, a village in Markazi province
- Kaveh Langeh, a village in Gilan province
- Kaveh Malek, a village in Mazandaran province
- Shahid Kaveh Metro Station (Mashhad Metro), Razavi Khorasan province

== Sport ==
- Kaveh Tehran BC, a defunct Iranian basketball club
- Bank Resalat Kerman FSC, known as Kaveh Zarand Kerman in 2011–2012, an Iranian futsal club
- Sanati Kaveh Tehran F.C., a defunct Iranian football club

== Other uses ==
- Kaveh (magazine), a 1916–1922 Persian-language periodical
- Kaveh (name), a Persian given name and surname
- Kaveh (star), or HD 175541, a star in the constellation Serpens
