= Districts of Isfahan =

The Iranian city of Isfahan is divided into 15 districts.

Isfahan city location map

== 1 ==
Range of boundaries of District 1 are from Shohada Square in the north, Enghelab square in south till Vahid bridge, East from Charbagh to Enghelab Square, in the west from Vahid bridge until ( Meidan Jomhori Eslami )Islamic republic square.

District 1 is a 810 hectare area.

There are three subway stations.

== 3 ==
District 3 (Persian: منطقه سه شهرداري اصفهان or منطقه 3 شهر اصفهان) is a district in the Iranian city of Isfahan. It has an area of 1148 hectares and is the tourism entry point of Isfahan city. It is a central business district. It hosts twenty seven thousand stores in Grand Isfahan market alone.

The district has one fire station and two fire departments under development. This district has a subway station.

Two hundred and thirty nine mosques are in this district, along with thirteen libraries, eight gymnasiums and five pools, three parks and four zurkhanehs.

== 4 ==
District 4 is a district in Isfahan, Iran.

There is a nuclear research center close to this district.

== 5 ==
District 5 is a district in the Iranian city of Isfahan. It was part of region 2 until 1971. The district has the administration of Sepahan Shahr and Mount Sofeh. 28 percent of the district is militarized.

It is one of the more developed parts of the city and important for tourism. District 13 was created out of part of this district in 2001.

This municipality manages New Julfa.

Universities in this district include: Isfahan University, Isfahan University of Medical Sciences, Art university of Isfahan, Mohajer Technical And Vocational College of Isfahan, Sepah University of Military Sciences and Technology.

Photovoltaics solar cells panels are used in municipality building rooftops.

== 6 ==
District 6 is an area of 6600 hectare in the southeastern part of Isfahan. Of the district a section is militarized Fourth Isfahan base for IRGC پایگاه چهارم رزمی عمومی اصفهان. There are 68 mosques, seven libraries, seven swimming pools, eight parks, twelve gymnasiums and two Zurkhanehs.

== 7 ==
District 7 has 12 main neighborhoods and is located north east of the city of Isfahan. The district was formed out of district 3 in 1981 it was broken up into another district 14 in 2008(1387 ) .

Total area of the land under district administration is 2857 hectare. There are fifty mosques, four libraries, seven parks, one pool and six gymnasiums. Social status average three out of four neighborhoods is 3.98.

== 12 ==
District 12 is the largest district in the Iranian city of Isfahan, located in the northwest.

Three neighborhoods in this district are among the city's most impoverished.

A business and commercial center tower project are under construction.

== 13 ==
District 13 (منطقه 13 اصفهان) is one of the largest of Isfahan's fifteen districts.

== 14 ==
District 14 was created in 2008 out of dividing District 7 in Northeast Isfahan. It was created in order to address the lack of administration of highly deprived neighborhoods.It has an area of 1900 hectares and an administrative area of 940 hectares. It's social and economic status ranking score is 3/44, which is the city's lowest.

== 15 ==
Khvorasgan (Persian: خوراسگان) (Note: Also romanized as Khvorāsgān; also known as Khavrāskān, Khorasgun, Khorasqān, and Khurāsqān) is a neighborhood in the city of Isfahan in the Central District of Isfahan County, Isfahan province, Iran.

== List of Municipal districts administrators ==
1. District 1: Mahin Shokrani since 2017
2. District 2: Kavous Haghani 2017
3. District 3: Hosein Kargar 2016
4. District 4: Reza Akhavan 2016
5. District 5: Ahmad Rezaei 2016
6. District 6: Mohammad Reza Barakat 2016
7. District 7: Ali Asghar Shatori 2016
8. District 8: Mohammad Keihani 2018
9. District 9: Alireza Rafii 2020
10. District 10: Hamid Shahbazi 2018
11. District 11: Hamid Ashrafi 2017
12. District 12:Ali Bagheri 2018
13. District 13:Mohamad Sharfa 2018
14. District 14: Ali Shamsi ejie 2016
15. District 15:Masoud Ghasemi 2018
16. Nazhvan district: Rasoul Hashemian 2019

=== Population ===
District population (2007)
| region | Size (km^{2}) | Population | Density (h./km^{2}) |
|---|---|---|---|
| 1 | 8 | 176,000 | 22,000 |
| 2 | 27 | 67,325 | 2,494 |
| 3 | 11 | 118,000 | 10,727 |
| 4 | 28 | 110,587 | 3,950 |
| 5 | 41 | 270,000 | 6,585 |
| 6 | 11 | 117,589 | 10,790 |
| 7 | 46 | 189,259 | 4,114 |
| 8 | 85 | 285,000 | 3,353 |
| 9 | 23 | 64,141 | 2,789 |
| 10 | 23 | 210,000 | 9,130 |
| 11 | 11 | 55,000 | 5,000 |
| Total | 279 | 1,657,901 | 5,942 |
