= Takhti Metro Station (Isfahan) =

Metro station in Isfahan, Iran

Tahkti Station ایستگاه تختی

General information
- Location: Takhti Int. Chaharbagh Avenue; Districts 1-3, Isfahan; Iran
- Coordinates: 32.6653722°N 51.6704366°E
- System: Isfahan Metro Station
- Operator: Isfahan Urban and Suburban Railways Organization
- Line: 1
- Connections: Isfahan City Buses: BRT 3 Arghavanieh Term. - Khorram Term.; 9 Jomhuri - Enqelab; 10 BaghQushkhane - Enqelab; 16 Malekshahr Jct.-Zayanderud Term.; 41 Tayyeb - Juyabad; 45 Ahmadabad - Rehnan; 78 Imam Hossein-Shahrak-e Valiasr; 85 Tayyeb - Shahrak Negin; 91 Soffeh-Malekshahr; 93 Khorram - Khorasgan

History
- Opened: 12 Aban, 1395 H-Sh; 2 November 2016; 9 years ago

Services
Preceding station	Isfahan Metro	Following station
Shohada towards Qods (Malek Shahr)	Line 1	Imam Hossein towards Defa'-e Moqaddas
Location

Takhti Metro Station is a station on Isfahan Metro Line 1. The station opened on 2 November 2016. It is located at Takhti intersection in central Isfahan. The next station on the north side is Shohada Station.
