= Shahid Chamran Metro Station (Isfahan) =

Metro station in Isfahan, Iran

Shahid Chamran Station ایستگاه شهید چمران

General information
- Location: Kaveh Boulevard; Districts 7-8, Isfahan; Iran
- Coordinates: 32°41′15″N 51°40′33″E
- System: Isfahan Metro Station
- Operator: Isfahan Urban and Suburban Railways Organization
- Line: 1
- Connections: Isfahan City Buses: 7 Baboldasht - Gharazi Hospital; 16 Malekshahr Jct.-Zayanderud Terminal; 17 Jomhuri - BaghQushkhane; 59 Baboldasht-Dastgerd; 70 Baboldasht - Golestan; 78 Imam Hossein-Shahrak-e Valiasr; 84 Abshar-Radan-Fizudan; 91 Soffeh-Malekshahr; Bablodasht - Gaz Borkhar

History
- Opening: 12 Aban, 1395 H-Sh; 2 November 2016; 9 years ago

Services
Preceding station	Isfahan Metro	Following station
Kaveh towards Qods (Malek Shahr)	Line 1	Shahid Bahonar towards Defa'-e Moqaddas
Location

Shahid Chamran Metro Station is a station on Isfahan Metro Line 1, Iran. The station opened on 2 November 2016. It is located at Kaveh Boulevard south of Chamran Bridge (intersecting Chamran Expwy. and Radanipur Expwy.) in Isfahan. The next station on the north side is Kaveh Station at Kaveh Bus Terminal and on the south side Shahid Bahonar Station.
