= Shohada Metro Station (Isfahan) =

Metro station in Isfahan, Iran

Shohada Station ایستگاه شهدا

General information
- Location: Shohada Square (Isfahan); Districts 1-3-7-8, Isfahan; Iran
- Coordinates: 32°40′20″N 51°40′21″E
- System: Isfahan Metro Station
- Operator: Isfahan Urban and Suburban Railways Organization
- Line: 1
- Connections: Isfahan City Buses: 9 Jomhuri - Enqelab; 10 BaghQushkhane - Enqelab; 16 Malekshahr Jct.-Zayanderud Terminal; 57 Jomhuri - Zeinabieh - Darak; 78 Imam Hossein-Shahrak-e Valiasr; 91 Soffeh-Malekshahr; Shahinshahr City Buses: 1 Shahinshahr-Isfahan Line 1; 9 Gaz-Isfahan; 12 Shahinshahr-Isfahan Line 2

History
- Opened: 23 Mehr, 1394 H-Sh; 15 October 2015; 10 years ago

Services
Preceding station	Isfahan Metro	Following station
Shahid Bahonar towards Qods (Malek Shahr)	Line 1	Takhti towards Defa'-e Moqaddas
Location

Shohada Metro Station is a station on Isfahan Metro Line 1. The station opened on 15 October 2015. It is located at Shohada Square at the beginning of Chaharbagh Payin Avenue in Isfahan. The next station on the north side is Shahid Bahonar Station and on the southern side is Takhti Station
