= Shahid Bahonar Metro Station (Isfahan) =

Metro station in Isfahan, Iran

Shahid Bahonar Station ایستگاه شهید باهنر

General information
- Location: 25 Aban Square; Districts 7-8, Isfahan; Iran
- Coordinates: 32°40′44″N 51°40′32″E
- System: Isfahan Metro Station
- Operator: Isfahan Urban and Suburban Railways Organization
- Line: 1
- Connections: Baboldasht Bus Terminal Isfahan City Buses: 7 Baboldasht - Gharazi Hospital; 16 Malekshahr Jct.-Zayanderud Terminal; 17 Jomhuri - BaghQushkhane; 20 BaghQushkhane - Malekshahr; 59 Baboldasht-Dastgerd; 70 Baboldasht - Golestan; 78 Imam Hossein-Shahrak-e Valiasr; 84 Abshar-Radan-Fizudan; 91 Soffeh-Malekshahr; Bablodasht - Gaz Borkhar

History
- Opened: 23 Mehr, 1394 H-Sh; 15 October 2015; 10 years ago

Services
Preceding station	Isfahan Metro	Following station
Shahid Chamran towards Qods (Malek Shahr)	Line 1	Shohada towards Defa'-e Moqaddas
Location

Shahid Bahonar Metro Station is a station on Isfahan Metro Line 1. The station opened on 15 October 2015. It is located at 25 Aban Square along Kaveh Boulevard in Isfahan. The next station on the north side is Shahid Chamran Station and on the south side Shohada Station.
