= Shahid Mofateh Metro Station (Isfahan) =

Metro station in Isfahan, Iran

Shahid Mofateh Station ایستگاه شهید مفتح

General information
- Location: Baharestan Boulevard- Mofateh St; Malekshahr, Districts 8-12, Isfahan; Iran
- Coordinates: 32°43′00″N 51°38′43″E
- System: Isfahan Metro Station
- Operator: Isfahan Urban and Suburban Railways Organization
- Line: 1
- Connections: Isfahan City Buses: 82 Malekshahr-Esteqlal

History
- Opened: 23 Mehr, 1394 H-Sh; 15 October 2015; 10 years ago

Services
Preceding station	Isfahan Metro	Following station
Golestan towards Qods (Malek Shahr)	Line 1	Shahid Alikhani towards Defa'-e Moqaddas
Location

Shahid Mofateh Metro Station is a station on Isfahan Metro Line 1. The station opened on 15 October 2015. It is located at Baharestan Boulevard, at Malekshahr in northern Isfahan. The next station on the west side is Golestan Station and on the east side Shahid Alikhani Station.
