= Golestan Metro Station (Isfahan) =

Metro station in Isfahan, Iran

Golestan Station ایستگاه گلستان

General information
- Location: Baharestan Boulevard, Malekshahr; Districts 8-12, Isfahan; Iran
- Coordinates: 32°42′55″N 51°37′38″E
- System: Isfahan Metro Station
- Operator: Isfahan Urban and Suburban Railways Organization
- Line: 1
- Connections: Isfahan City Buses: 82 Malekshahr-Esteqlal

History
- Opened: 12 Aban, 1395 H-Sh; 2 November 2016; 9 years ago

Services
Preceding station	Isfahan Metro	Following station
Baharestan towards Qods (Malek Shahr)	Line 1	Shahid Mofateh towards Defa'-e Moqaddas
Location

Golestan Metro Station is a station on Isfahan Metro Line 1. The station opened on 02 November 2016. It is located at Baharestan Boulevard in northern Isfahan. The next station on the west side is Baharestan Station having a similar status as yet unopened. and on the east side Shahid Mofateh Station.
