= Municipality of Isfahan =

- Formation: 1907
- Budget: 6000 billion tomans (2020)
- Website: isfahan.ir

The Municipality of Isfahan is responsible for the management of the city of Isfahan, Isfahan Province, Iran. The highest-ranking official of this organization is the mayor of Isfahan, who is chosen by the Islamic City Council of Isfahan. The city of Isfahan has 15 administrative divisions and each division has its own mayor, who work under the mayor of Isfahan. The present mayor of Isfahan is Ali Ghasemzadeh.

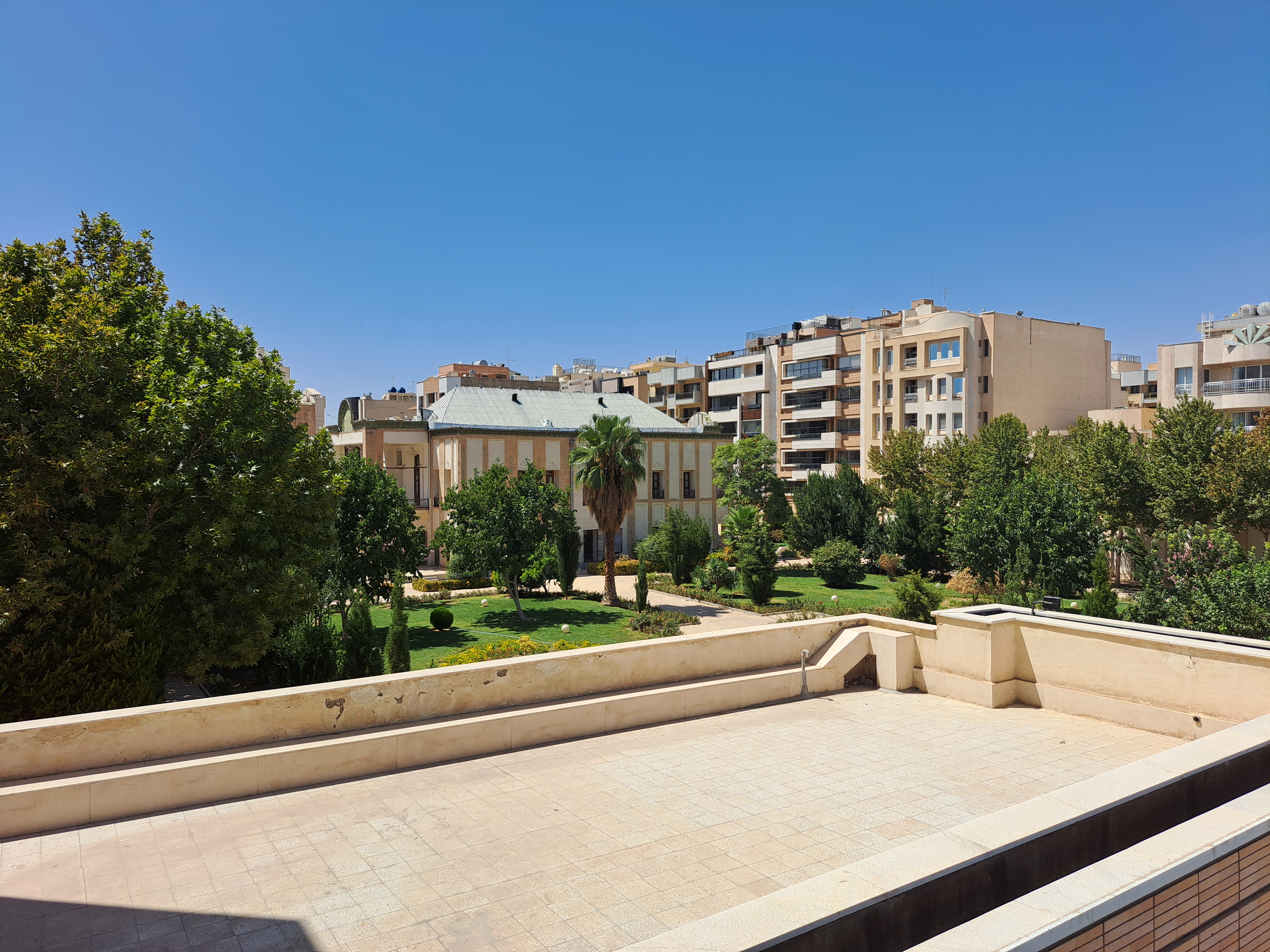
Kooshk zereshk garden isfahan municipality

== History ==
The municipality of Isfahan was founded in 1907. In that time, it was named Baladiyeh. The council of Baladiyeh appointed Haji Mohammad Ali Khan (The sheriff of Isfahan) as the chief of Baladiyeh, Mirza Mehdi Khan as the deputy and Mirza Abolhasan Khan for official services. But after two weeks, Haji Mohammad Ali Khan was replaced by Mirza Assadollah Vassigholmilk. Baladiyeh had at first only 25 members. In 1911, the Baladiyeh faced a financial crisis because of shortage of income and the chief of Baladieyeh resigned and council of Baladiyeh decided to decrease its range of activities and only look after the provisions of the city.

With the amendment of baladiyeh's law in 1930, the responsibility of choosing mayor was given to the Interior ministry.

Until 1927, Isfahan had only two main streets, Charbagh-e Hezar Jarib street and Charbagh-e Abbassi street, and several broad alleys. from 1935 after giving more powers to the municipality of Isfahan, the municipality decided to rebuild new streets and so Foroughi street, Modarres street, Jomhouri square, Bozorgmehr street and Soroush street were built and the neighborhoods Hatef, hafez, Sepah and Neshat were changed gradually to streets. In 1941 with allocating oil income to the municipality and increasing its income, the streets of Isfahan were asphalted and several garbage trucks were purchased.

In 2023 Isfahani workers were deployed to clean Iraqi cities.

== Districts ==
The city is divided into fifteen districts.

- 1
- 2
- 3
- 4
- 5
- 6
- 7
- 8
- 9
- 10
- 11
- 12
- 13
- 14
- 15

== Organizational structures ==
- Deputy of administration and finance
- Deputy of research planning and IT
- Deputy of transportation and traffic
- Deputy of civil services
- Deputy of city planning and architecture
- Deputy of urban development
- Deputy of cultural and social affairs
- Deputy of coordination of districts
- Municipalities of the 15 municipal districts

== Dependent organizations ==
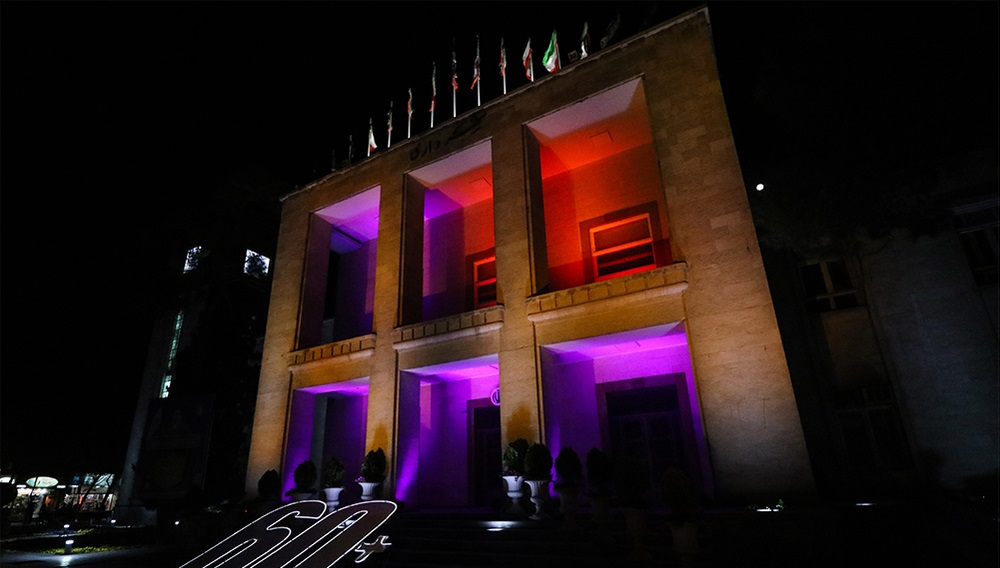
Main building of Municipality of Isfahan

- Fire and safety services
- Cemeteries
- Parks and green spaces
- Terminals
- Motorized services
- Development
- Subway
- Taxi services
- markets and regulation of occupations
- Designing
- Renovation and improvements
- Bus services
- Waste management
- Culture and Recreation
- IT and communication
- Beautification
- Transportation and cargo
- Sport

== Program ==
The city has the "solar municipal 2036" will install and supply solar panels to its buildings.

The municipality parks department have developed dormant therapy for trees with Isfahan University of Technology.

== Controversy ==
It is criticized for the Isfahan Zoo.

== See also ==
- Adib Astronomy Teaching Centre
- Math house
