= Shahid Alikhani Metro Station (Isfahan) =

Metro station in Isfahan, Iran

Shahid Alikhani Station ایستگاه شهید علیخانی

General information
- Location: Alikhani Sq. Malekshahr, Districts 8-12, Isfahan; Iran
- Coordinates: 32°42′58″N 51°39′39″E
- System: Isfahan Metro Station
- Operator: Isfahan Urban and Suburban Railways Organization
- Line: 1
- Connections: Isfahan City Buses: 20 BaghQushkhane - Malekshahr; 24 Jomhuri - Negin; 77 Jomhuri - Shahrak-e Azadegan; 82 Malekshahr - Esteqlal; 85 Tayyeb - Shahrak-e Negin; 91 Soffeh-Malekshahr; 92 Hasht Behesht-Khaneh Esfahan; 94 Janbazan-Malekshahr

History
- Opened: 23 Mehr, 1394 H-Sh; 15 October 2015; 10 years ago

Services
| Preceding station | Isfahan Metro | Following station |
|---|---|---|
| Shahid Mofateh towards Qods (Malek Shahr) | Line 1 | Jaber towards Defa'-e Moqaddas |
Location

Shahid Alikhani Metro Station is a station on Isfahan Metro Line 1. The station opened on 15 October 2015. It is located at Shahid Alikhani Sq., formerly known as Malekshahr Sq., at Malekshahr in northern Isfahan. The next station on the west side is Shahid Mofateh Station and on the southeast side Jaber Station.
