= Baharestan Metro Station (Isfahan) =

Metro station in Isfahan, Iran

Baharestan Station ایستگاه بهارستان

General information
- Location: Baharestan Boulevard; Districts 8-12, Isfahan; Iran
- Coordinates: 32°42′55″N 51°37′31″E
- System: Isfahan Metro Station
- Operator: Isfahan Urban and Suburban Railways Organization
- Line: 1
- Connections: Isfahan City Buses: 82 Malekshahr-Esteqlal

History
- Opened: 12 Aban, 1395 H-Sh; 2 November 2016; 9 years ago

Services
Preceding station	Isfahan Metro	Following station
Qods towards Qods (Malek Shahr)	Line 1	Golestan towards Defa'-e Moqaddas
Location

Baharestan Metro Station is a station on Isfahan Metro Line 1. The station started operation on 2 November 2016. It is located at Baharestan Boulevard in northern Isfahan. The next station on the west side is Qods Station and on the east side Golestan Station having a similar status as yet unopened.
