= Shari'ati Metro Station (Isfahan) =

Metro station in Isfahan, Iran

Shari'ati Station ایستگاه شریعتی

General information
- Location: Chaharbagh Bala Avenue; Districts 5-6, Isfahan; Iran
- Coordinates: 32.6283031°N 51.6654987°E
- System: Isfahan Metro Station
- Operator: Isfahan Urban and Suburban Railways Organization
- Line: 1
- Connections: Isfahan City Buses: 14 Hotel Pol - Mardavij/Kuy-e Bahar; 36 Hotel Pol - Kuy-e Emam; 61 Hotel Pol - Kuy-e Emam Jafar Sadeq; 62 Hotel Pol - Kuy-e Sepahan

History
- Opened: 29 Mordad, 1396 H-Sh; 20 July 2017; 9 years ago

Services
Preceding station	Isfahan Metro	Following station
Si-o-se Pol towards Qods (Malek Shahr)	Line 1	Azadi towards Defa'-e Moqaddas
Location

Shari'ati Metro Station is a station on Isfahan Metro Line 1. The station opened on 20 July 2017. It is located on intersection in southern central Isfahan along Chaharbagh Avenue just north of the intersection with Shariati and Nikbakht Streets. The next station to the north is Si-o-se Pol Station and to the south Azadi Station.
