= Jaber Metro Station (Isfahan) =

Metro station in Isfahan, Iran

Jaber Station ایستگاه جابر

General information
- Location: Adelpur St. District 8, Isfahan; Iran
- Coordinates: 32°42′32″N 51°40′02″E
- System: Isfahan Metro Station
- Operator: Isfahan Urban and Suburban Railways Organization
- Line: 1

History
- Opened: 23 Mehr, 1394 H-Sh; 15 October 2015; 10 years ago

Services
Preceding station	Isfahan Metro	Following station
Shahid Alikhani towards Qods (Malek Shahr)	Line 1	Kaveh towards Defa'-e Moqaddas
Location

Jaber Metro Station is a station on Isfahan Metro Line 1. The station opened on 15 October 2015. It is located at Adelpur St., in northern Isfahan. The next station on the northwest side is Shahid Alikhani Station and on the south side Kaveh Station.
