= Kaveh Metro Station (Isfahan) =

Metro station in Isfahan, Iran

Kaveh Station ایستگاه کاوه

General information
- Location: Kaveh Boulevard; District 8, Isfahan; Iran
- Coordinates: 32°41′53″N 51°40′27″E
- System: Isfahan Metro Station
- Operator: Isfahan Urban and Suburban Railways Organization
- Line: 1
- Connections: Kaveh Bus Terminal Isfahan City Buses: 7 Baboldasht - Gharazi Hospital; 16 Malekshahr Jct.-Zayanderud Terminal; 17 Jomhuri - BaghQushkhane; 27 Jomhuri - Kaveh; 59 Baboldasht-Dastgerd; 70 Baboldasht - Golestan; 78 Imam Hossein-Shahrak-e Valiasr; 80 Soffeh-Bozorgmehr-Malekshahr Jct.; 83 Kaveh-Bozorgmehr; 91 Soffeh-Malekshahr; 94 Janbazan-Malekshahr; Bablodasht - Gaz Borkhar

History
- Opened: 23 Mehr, 1394 H-Sh; 15 October 2015; 10 years ago

Services
Preceding station	Isfahan Metro	Following station
Jaber towards Qods (Malek Shahr)	Line 1	Shahid Chamran towards Defa'-e Moqaddas
Location

Central station or Kaveh Metro Station is a station on Isfahan Metro Line 1. The station opened on 15 October 2015. It is located at Kaveh Bus Terminal, on Kaveh Boulevard in Isfahan. The station will serve as an inter-provincial passenger hub, as there is the bus terminal there, and there are plans for Tehran-Qom-Isfahan High Speed Rail to terminate at this location too. The next station on the north side is Jaber Station and on the southeast side Shahid Chamran Station.
