= Kaveh Boulevard =

Boulevard in Northern Isfahan, Isfahan Province, Iran

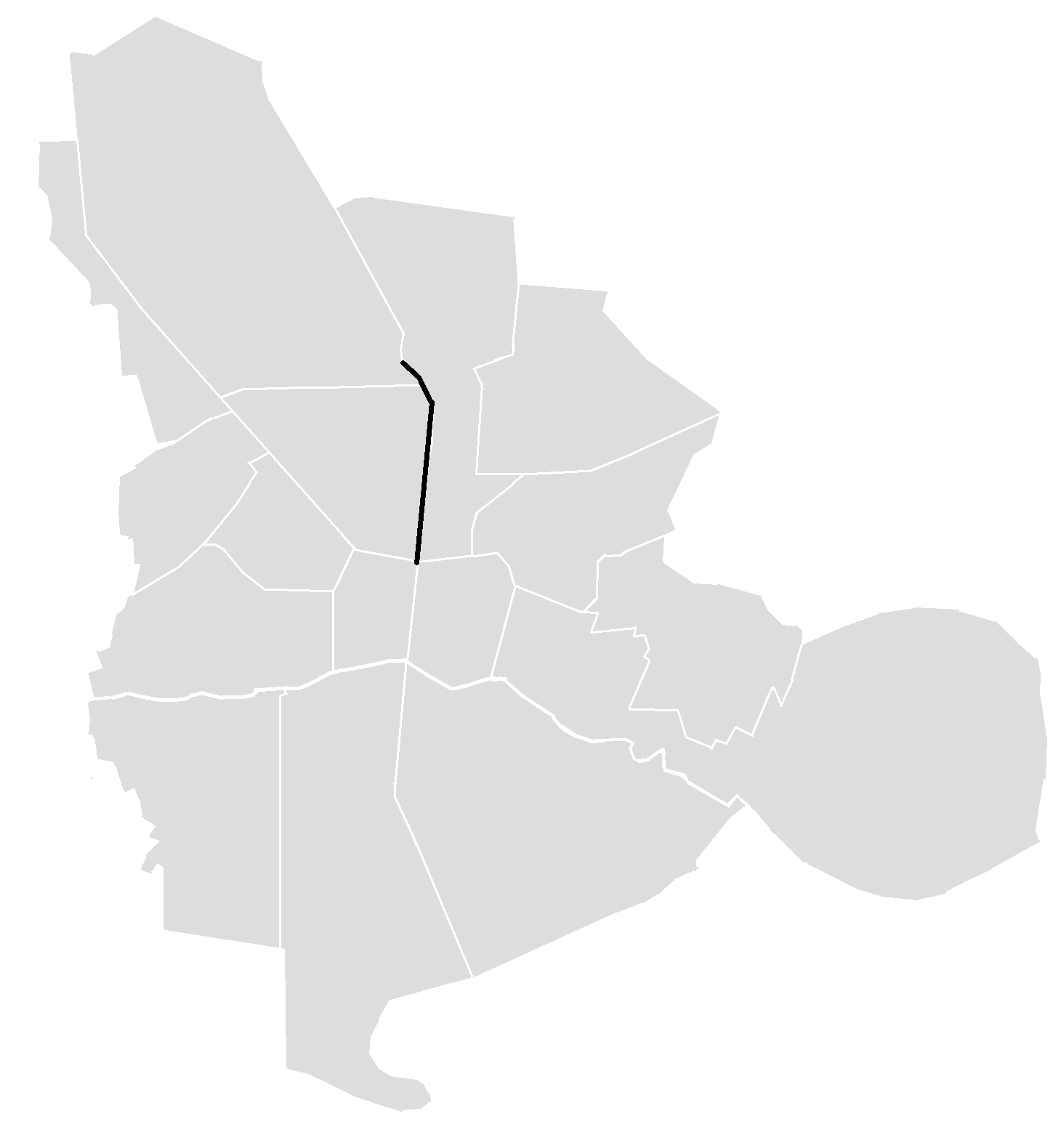
- Native name: بلوار کاوه (Persian)
- Length: 7.0 km (4.3 mi)
- Location: Isfahan, Isfahan
- North end: Mo'allem Freeway; Taksirani Boulevard
- South end: Shohada Squrare

Kaveh Boulevard (Persian: بلوار کاوه) is a boulevard in Northern Isfahan, Isfahan Province, Iran. Kaveh Terminal and Isfahan Urban and Suburban Railway Organization Headquarters are located along the boulevard. The boulevard is also currently the main entrance to the city from the North and Tehran, as the Freeway towards Tehran terminates at the northern end of the boulevard.

From North to South
Continues as: Mo'allem Freeway
	Taksirani Boulevard
	Gharazi Street
Service Station
Malekshahr Jct.	Baharestan Boulevard; Golestan Boulevard; Negarestan Boulevard
	Mokhaberat Street
	Shahid Adelpur Street
	Ostad Falaturi Boulevard; Jaber Ansari Boulevard; Abureihan-e Biruni Boulevard
Kaveh Metro Station; Kaveh Bus Terminal
Chamran Interchange	Chamran Expressway; Shahid Radanipour Expressway
Shahid Chamran Metro Station
U-Turn
25 Aban Square	Bahonar Boulevard; Adib Boulevard
Shahid Bahonar Metro Station; Baboldasht Bus Terminal
	Baboldasht Street
U-Turn
Shohada Squrare	Foruqi Street; Ebn-e Sina Street; Modares Street Shohada Metro Station
Continues as: Chaharbagh Pa'in
From South to North
