= Enqelab =

Enqelab (Persian: انقلاب; also spelled Enghelab) means "revolution" in Persian, and may refer to several places in Iran:

- Enghelāb-e Eslāmi Technical College, Tehran
- Enghelab Sport Complex, Tehran
- Enghelab Stadium, Karaj
- Enqelab Square, Tehran
- Enqelab Square, Isfahan
- Enqelab Street, Tehran
