= Ardestani Expressway =

Iranian expressway

Ardestani Expressway
- بزرگراه شهید اردستانی
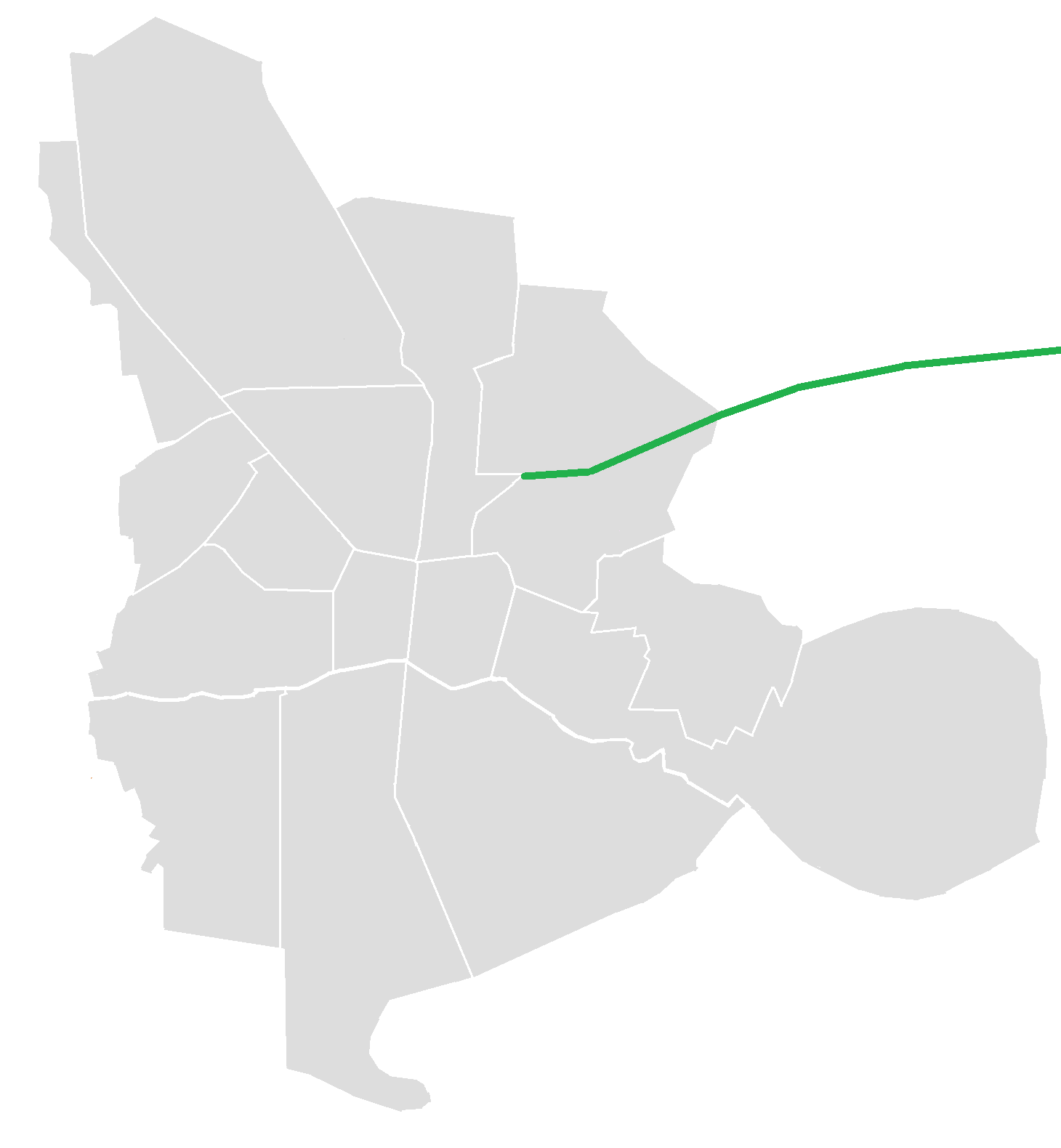

Route information
- Length: 14.7 km (9.1 mi)

Major junctions
- East end: Laleh Square; Chamran Expressway
- West end: Shahrak-e Sanaati Jey Expressway

Location
- Country: Iran
- Major cities: Isfahan, Qahjavarestan

Highway system
- Highways in Iran; Freeways

َArdestani Expressway (Persian: بزرگراه شهید اردستانی) is an expressway in northeastern Isfahan, Iran connecting to Isfahan International Airport via Qahjavarestan.

== Route ==
From East to West
		Isfahan International Airport; Shahrak-e Sanaati Jey Expressway
		Sorush Street; Towards Qahjavarestan
		Paygah-e haftom-e Shekari
		Isfahan Eastern Bypass Freeway
		Isfahan Northeast Bypass Expressway
Isfahan; Municipal Districts 10 and 14
		Hasseh
		Ashegh Esfahani Street; Khatunabad Road
23		Aghababaei Expressway
22		Sheikh Tusi Street
21A / 21B	Laleh Square	Laleh Boulevard; Zeinabieh Boulevard; Parvin E'tesami Boulevard
Continues as: Chamran Expressway
From West to East
