= Risbaf National Corporation =

Risbaf Factory
- کارخانه ریسباف (Persian)
- Interactive map of Risbaf Factory
- 32.63895246947265°N 51.66799037610207°E

History
- Built: 1932; 94 years ago

Risbaf was a textile spinning factory established in 1932 in Iranian city of Isfahan. The plan for the building was designed by German architect Max Otto Schönemann and executed by Iranian traditional master builders called "Ostadmemars". The factory is located on 7-hectares parcel of land, and it's planned to be repurposed site of a museum to be built in the future through Iranian Cities Urban Renewal Company.

In 1959 there were worker strikes. They were primarily due to an economic recession that came about due to World War 2. This eventually led to discord and disagreement between workers and managers and a social unrest.

== Reconstruction ==
It was proposed to become changed to an innovation factory.

== Location ==
It is in Charbagh-bala Avenue south of Siosepol bridges, where real estate development has to be approved through Minister of Tourism and Cultural Heritage.
