= Azadi Metro Station (Isfahan) =

Metro station in Isfahan, Iran

Azadi Station ایستگاه آزادی

General information
- Location: Azadi Square (Darvazeh Shiraz); Districts 5-6, Isfahan; Iran
- Coordinates: 32.6223563°N 51.6648255°E
- System: Isfahan Metro Station
- Operator: Isfahan Urban and Suburban Railways Organization
- Line: 1
- Connections: Isfahan City Buses: BRT1 Baghushkhaneh - Yazdabad Bridge; 14 Hotel Pol - Mardavij/Kuy-e Bahar; 34 Jomhuri Sq. - Soffeh Term.; 36 Hotel Pol - Kuy-e Emam; 37 Azadi - Rahahan; 54 Azadi - Baharestan (Development Co.); 55 Azadi - Baharestan (Valiasr); 61 Hotel Pol - Kuy-e Emam Jafar Sadeq; 62 Hotel Pol - Kuy-e Sepahan; 63 Emam Hussein Sq. - Isfahan Uni.; 76 Azadi - Sepahanshahr (Shahed); 86 Azadi - Sepahanshahr (Ghadir); 91 Malekshahr - Soffeh

History
- Opened: 29 Mordad, 1396 H-Sh; 20 July 2017; 9 years ago

Services
Preceding station	Isfahan Metro	Following station
Shari'ati towards Qods (Malek Shahr)	Line 1	Daneshgah-e Esfahan towards Defa'-e Moqaddas
Location

Azadi Metro Station is a station on Isfahan Metro Line 1. The station opened on 20 July 2017. It is located on Azadi Square, also known as Darvazeh Shiraz (Shiraz Gate). The next station on the north side is Shari'ati Station. The station is located next to University of Isfahan campus.
