= Enqelab Square (Isfahan) =

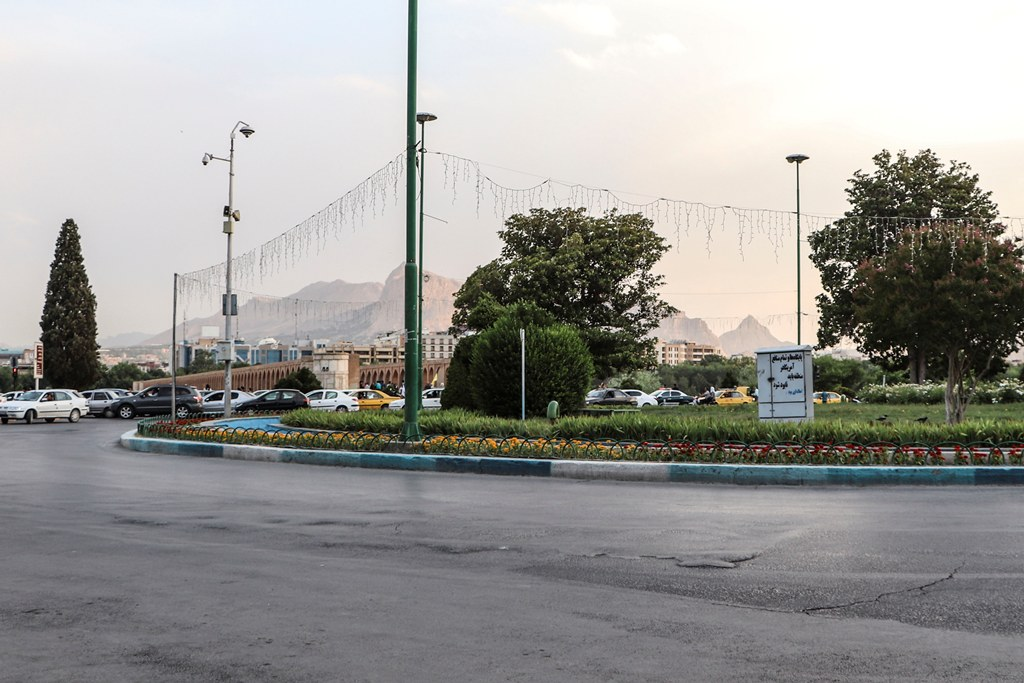
- Interactive map of Enqelab Square
- Location: Isfahan, Iran
- Coordinates: 32.64653°N 51.66778°E
- North: Chahar Bagh Boulevard
- East: Kamal Esmael Street
- South: Si-o-se-pol bridge
- West: Motahari Street

Enqelab Square is a square in downtown Isfahan, Iran. It is located between the southern tip of Chahar Bagh Boulevard and the historical Si-o-se-pol bridge. Si-o-se Pol Metro Station is just across the bridge.

Built as a roundabout to deal high flow of traffic, the square has green landscape area in the centre.
