= Isfahan central fruit and vegetable market =

Wholesale farmer's market in Isfahan, Iran

Coordinates: 32.6464°N 51.7977°E

Central fruit and vegetable market of Isfahan is the wholesale farmers market controlled by Isfahan Municipality Samandehi Organization. It is located on Naein Road east of Isfahan. The market complex also buys and sells meat, groceries, fisheries. The markets' facilities are continually being expanded.

As a whole sale market the prices are 25% cheaper than average store in Isfahan. On average 5000 tons of fruit and grocery are traded in the market each day. It has an area of 198 hectares and contains around 800 shops. There is a mechanized fruit cleansing unit.
