= Chamran Expressway (Isfahan) =

Expressway in Isfahan, Iran

Chamran Expressway
- بزرگراه چمران
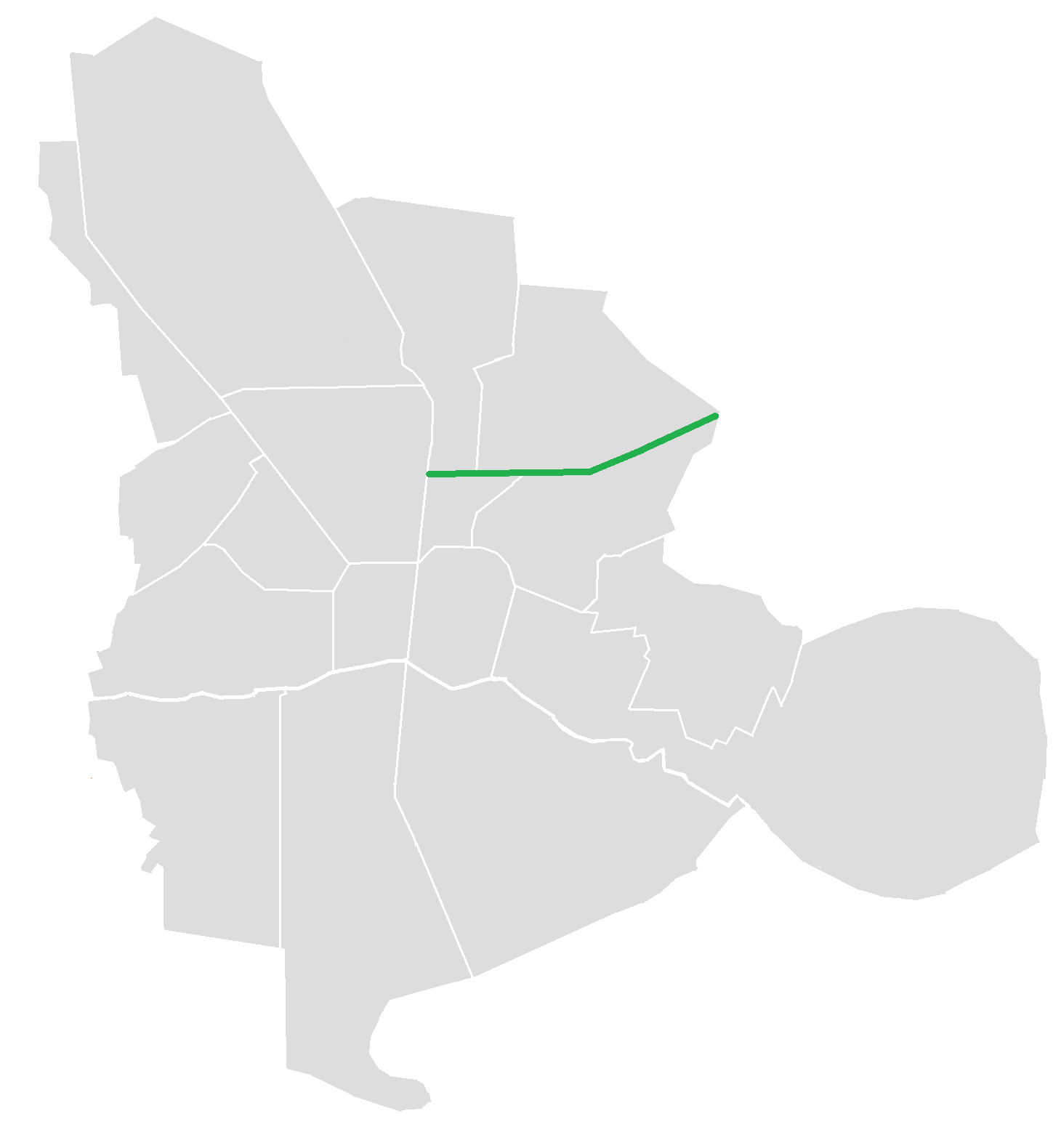

Route information
- Length: 7.5 km (4.7 mi)

Major junctions
- East end: Laleh Square Ardestani Expressway
- West end: Radanipur Expressway; Kaveh Boulevard

Location
- Country: Iran
- Major cities: isfahan

Highway system
- Highways in Iran; Freeways

Chamran Expressway (Persian: بزرگراه شهید چمران) is an expressway in northeastern Isfahan, Iran.

From East to West
Continues as: Isfahan Airport Freeway
		Hasseh
		Ashegh Esfahani Street; Khatunabad Road
23		Aghababaei Expressway
22		Sheikh Tusi Street
21A / 21B / 22	Laleh Square	Laleh Boulevard; Zeinabieh Boulevard; Parvin E'tesami Boulevard; Be'sat Street
20; East-bound Only		Be'sat Street; Farvardin Street
West-bound Only		Mohammad Taher Street; Al-e Yasin Street
20A; West-bound Only		Shahed Street; Al-e Mohammad Street
20B; West-bound Only		N. Eshraq Street
19A / 19B		Molavi Street
18	Chamran Interchange	Kaveh Boulevard Shahid Chamran Metro Station
Continues as: Radanipur Expressway
From West to East
