= Hall of Art, Isfahan =

Hall in Isfahan Iran

Hall of Art, Isfahan (Persian: تالار هنر اصفهان) of Municipality of Isfahan was opened in 2003. It has a main hall with a capacity of 323 people and a side hall with a capacity of 80 people, it is a place for performing the theaters of Isfahan city. About 30 Iranian films and 30 foreign films were screened in this hall for artistic analysis. Conferences and art sessions are held in this hall.

It was reopened in 2021 after rebuilding.

- Location: Chamran Avenue Isfahan, Iran - Coordinates: 32°41'36.9"N 51°42'18.4"E - Owner: Municipality of isfahan - ---- Capacity: 323 fixed seats,80 on the blackBox - Opened Oct 30, 2003

WebSite: http://talarhonar.esfahanfarhang.ir/

Instagram: https://www.instagram.com/talarhonar_isfahan/

Aparat: https://www.aparat.com/TalarHonar_Isfahan

== Features ==
There are also a decoration workshop, five practice plateaus. two makeup rooms, lighting equipment, Black box theater spaces.
