= District 14, Isfahan =

District 14, Isfahan منطقه ۱۴ اصفهان منطقه چهارده
- Interactive map of District 14, Isfahan
- Coordinates: 32.710557°N 51.724526°E

District 14 was created in 2008 out of dividing District 7 in Northeast Isfahan. It was created in order to address the lack of administration of highly deprived neighborhoods.It has an area of 1900 hectares and an administrative area of 940 hectares. It's social and economic status ranking score is 3/44, which is the city's lowest.

== Transport ==
In the future, two Isfahan Metro lanes are planned to pass through the district.

== Geography ==
To the south of the District, is District 15, and on the west is District 12.

== Amenities ==
In District 14, there are 74 mosques, and 5 Imamzadeh. It also has 3 libraries/study halls, 6 gymnasiums, and 4 parks The district has a fire station (19) and also a police department.

== Neighborhoods ==
District neighborhoods include:

- Dark - دارک
- Imam Khomeini (Which is not the same as Imam Khomeini street and freeway flyover bridge in the city's western sector)- امام خمینی
- MontazerulMahdi - منتظرالمهدی
- AmanSamani- عمان سامانی
- Batun - باتون (مهدیه)
- Elahie - الهیه
- Jelvan - جلوان
- Arznan - Zeynabieh - ارزنان- زينبيه
- Sudan - سودان
- DuTeflan - دوطفلان
- Shah pasand - شاهپسند
- North Hasseh - حصه شمالي
