= Si-o-se Pol Metro Station (Isfahan) =

Metro station in Isfahan, Iran

Si-o-se Pol Station ایستگاه سی و سه پل

General information
- Location: Chaharbagh Bala Avenue; Districts 5-6, Isfahan; Iran
- Coordinates: 32.6392898°N 51.6667003°E
- System: Isfahan Metro Station
- Operator: Isfahan Urban and Suburban Railways Organization
- Line: 1
- Connections: Isfahan City Buses: 14 Hotel Pol - Mardavij/Kuy-e Bahar; 36 Hotel Pol - Kuy-e Emam; 61 Hotel Pol - Kuy-e Emam Jafar Sadeq; 62 Hotel Pol - Kuy-e Sepahan

History
- Opened: 29 Mordad, 1396 H-Sh; 20 July 2017; 9 years ago

Services
Preceding station	Isfahan Metro	Following station
Enqelab towards Qods (Malek Shahr)	Line 1	Shari'ati towards Defa'-e Moqaddas
Location

Si-o-se Pol Metro Station is a station on Isfahan Metro Line 1. The station opened on 20 July 2017. It is located on intersection in central Isfahan along Chaharbagh Avenue just south of Zayanderud. The next operational station on the north side is Enqelab Station across from the river and on the south it's followed by Shari'ati Station.
