= Radanipur Expressway =

Road in Iran

Radanipur Expressway
- بزرگراه شهید ردانی پور
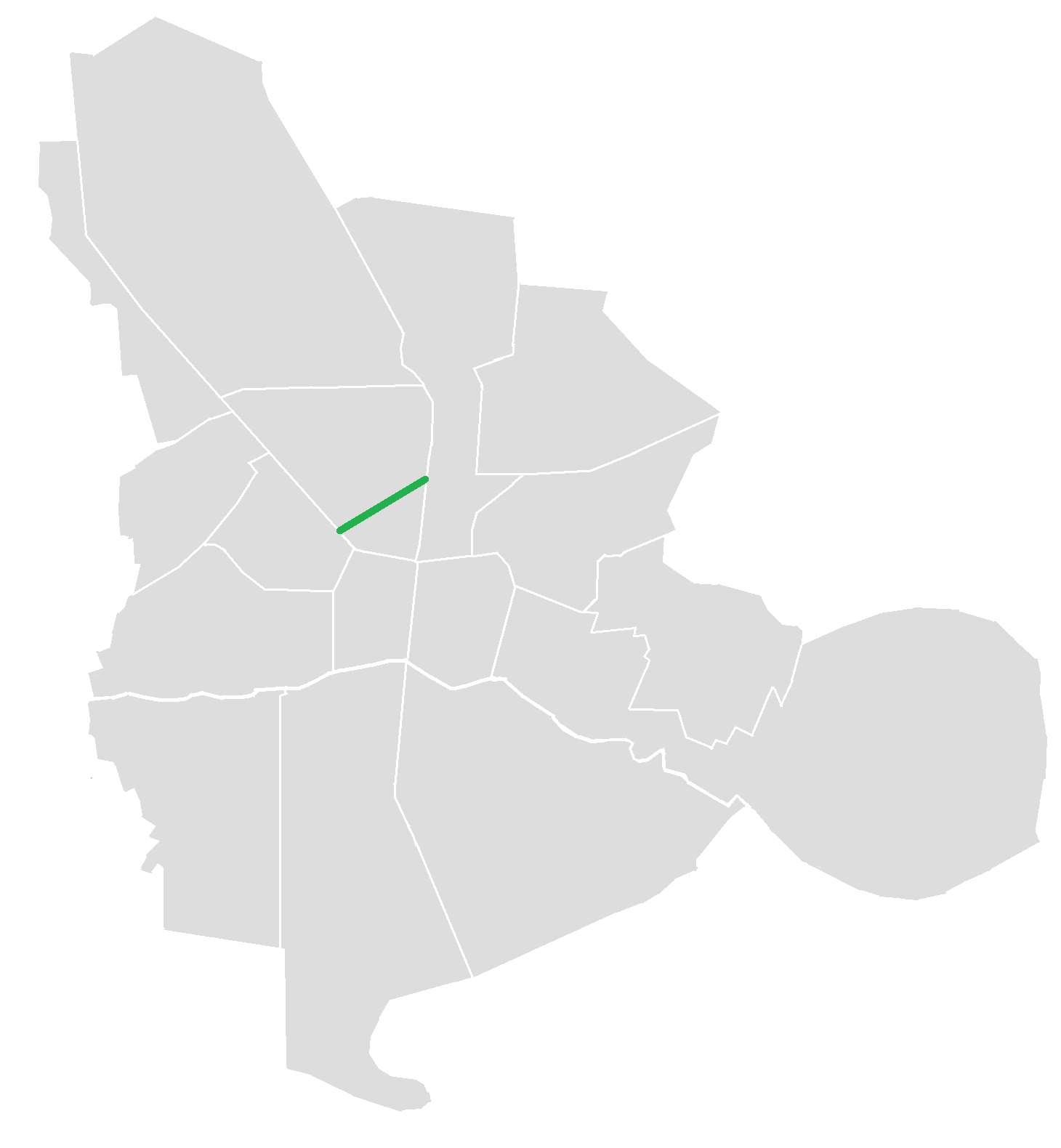

Route information
- Length: 3.5 km (2.2 mi)

Major junctions
- East end: Chamran Expressway; Kaveh Boulevard
- West end: Kharrazi Expressway; Imam Khomeini Expressway; Imam Khomeini Boulevard

Location
- Country: Iran
- Major cities: Esfahan

Highway system
- Highways in Iran; Freeways

Radanipur Expressway (Persian: بزرگراه شهید ردانی پور) is an expressway in Esfahan, Iran.

From East to West
Continues as: Chamran Expressway
18	Chamran Interchange	Kaveh Boulevard Shahid Chamran Metro Station
17		5 Azar Street
16		Robat Boulevard
		Bahonar Boulevard
15A / 15B		Imam Khomeini Expressway; Imam Khomeini Boulevard
Continues as: Kharrazi Expressway
From West to East
