= Kaveh (name) =

Kaveh is a Persian name. It is both a given name and a surname.

== Given name ==
- Kaave Lajevardi (born 1971), Iranian philosopher
- Kaveh Afagh (born 1983), Iranian singer-songwriter
- Kaveh L. Afrasiabi (born 1958), Iranian-American political scientist
- Kaveh Akbar (born 1989), Iranian American writer
- Kaveh Alamouti (born 1954), Iranian-British investment banker
- Kaveh Farrokh (born 1962), Greek historian of Iran
- Kaveh Golestan (1950–2003), Iranian photojournalist and artist
- Kaveh Madani (born 1981), Iranian environmental scientist
- Kaveh Mazaheri (born 1981), Iranian director and scriptwriter
- Kaveh Mehrabi (born 1982), Iranian badminton player
- Kaveh Mousavi (born 1985), Iranian athlete
- Kaveh Nabatian, Iranian-Canadian musician and film director
- Kaveh Pahlavan (1951–2024), American academic
- Kaveh Rad (born 2001), American soccer player
- Kaveh Rastegar (born 1975), Persian-American jazz musician
- Kaveh Rezaei (born 1992), Iranian footballer
- Kaveh Shojania, Canadian doctor and academic
- Kaveh Solhekol, English sports journalist
- Kahveh Zahiroleslam (born 2002), American footballer

== Surname ==
- Ali Kaveh (born 1946), Iranian photojournalist
- Ardalan Shoja Kaveh (born 1963), Iranian actor
- Mahmoud Kaveh (1961–1986), Iranian military commander
- Mohammadreza Kaveh (born 1997), Iranian footballer
- Moshe Kaveh (born 1943), Israeli physicist

== Fictional characters ==
- Kaveh, a character in 2020 video game Genshin Impact

== See also ==
- Kaveh
- Kaveh the Blacksmith
