= Adib Astronomy Teaching Centre =

Teaching centre

Adib Astronomy Teaching Centre (Persian: مرکز آموزش نجوم ادیب) in Isfahan, Iran from Municipality of Isfahan's sport and culture organization started in 1994 with the purpose of recreation and learning. It has a specialized library, a 3D film cinema, an exhibition and observation tools.
