= Taveh Badom =

Taveh Badom طاوه بادام
- Village
- Location within Iran
- Coordinates: 30°38′39″N 51°28′23″E
- Country: Iran
- Province: Kohgiluyeh and Boyer-Ahmad
- County: Boyer-Ahmad
- Bakhsh: Central
- Rural District: Dasht-e Rum

Population (2006)
  - Total: 202
- Time zone: UTC+3:30 (IRST)
  - Summer (DST): UTC+4:30 (IRDT)

Taveh Badom (Persian: طاوه بادام, also Romanized as Tāveh Bādom; also known as Kāveh Bādām and Tāvīeh Bādom) is a village in Dasht-e Rum Rural District, in the Central District of Boyer-Ahmad County, Kohgiluyeh and Boyer-Ahmad Province, Iran. At the 2006 census, its population was 202, in 40 families.
