= Kaveh-ye Sofla =

Kaveh-ye Sofla كاوه سفلي
- Village
- Location within Iran
- Coordinates: 34°07′46″N 47°39′33″E
- Country: Iran
- Province: Lorestan
- County: Delfan
- Bakhsh: Kakavand
- Rural District: Kakavand-e Sharqi

Population (2006)
  - Total: 52
- Time zone: UTC+3:30 (IRST)
  - Summer (DST): UTC+4:30 (IRDT)

Kaveh-ye Sofla (Persian: كاوه سفلي, romanized as Kāveh-ye Soflá; also known as Kāveh) is a village in Kakavand-e Sharqi Rural District, Kakavand District, Delfan County, Lorestan Province, Iran. At the 2006 census, its population was 52, in 11 families.
