= Imam Khomeini Expressway =

Road in Iran

Imam Khomeini Expressway
- بزرگراه امام خمینی

Route information
- Length: 11.00 km (6.84 mi)

Major junctions
- North end: Kharrazi Expressway
- South end: Azadegan Expressway

Location
- Country: Iran
- Major cities: Esfahan

Highway system
- Highways in Iran; Freeways

Imam Khomeini Street is a renowned street in the 12th district of Isfahan province, Iran. There is a concrete bridge that is built over the road. It starts from Jomhouri-e-Eslami Square, and is the way between Kharrazi Expressway and Isfahan-Tehran freeway.

== Name ==
Before the Islamic revolution it was called (St. Nausherwan - خیابان انوشیروان ) By name of the prominent king Khosrow I.

But after the Islamic Revolution it was renamed St. Imam Khomeini in honor of the revolution's leader Ruhollah Khomeini

== Length ==
By declarance of Hexa the length of bridge is about 5 km

But length of to boulevard by google maps is about 11 km

== Concrete bridge or elevated expressway (by Hexa) ==
Project2 - Detail | Hexa Co

=== Phase I ===
Concrete bridge overpasses Imam Khomeini avenue Isfahan city

Employer: Isfahan municipality

Consultant: Hexa

Contract year: 2006

Place of work: Isfahan

Working values: Ground and underground operations: 60,000 cubic meters

Concrete operations: 70000 cubic meters

Formatting operations: 150,000 Metal works (rebar): 9000000 kg

=== Phase II ===
Concrete Bridge over the Imam Khomeini Highway (Esfahan).

Municipality of isfahan

Employer: Isfahan Municipality

Consultant: Hexa

Contract year: 2007

Place of work: Isfahan

Working values:

Soil and stone operations: 21,500 m 3

Concrete work: 32,000 cubic meters

Formatting operation: 40000 sq. M

Metal work (rebar): 4200000 kg

=== Phase III ===
Concrete Bridge over the Imam Khomeini Highway

Municipality of isfahan

Employer: Isfahan Municipality

Consultant: Hexa

Contract year: 1388

Place of work: Isfahan

Working values:

Soil and stone operations: 22,000 cubic meters

Concrete work: 55,000 cubic meters

Formatting: 110,000 sq.m.

Metal work (rebar): 8,000,000 kg

== Neighborhoods ==
Asheq abad:

Ashegh Abad neighborhood from the west to Imam Khomeini (RA) street, south to Golzar Street, and east and north to Marchein desert.

The neighborhood with a total area of 2254423 square meters is home to 168336 people. Population density in Asheghabad neighborhood is 72 people per hectare.

Kowsar Township:

In this town with an area of 958936 square meters, 10915 people live. Population density in Ko'ars is 118 people per hectare.

Mahmoud Abad neighborhood:

Mahmood Abad neighborhood is located south of Rajaee Street and west to Seyyed Mostafa Mahmoud Abadi Street. In this neighborhood with an area of 806399 square meters, 5492 inhabitants reside. Population density in Mahmoud Abad neighborhood is 68 people per hectare.

Montazeri Town:

The town with its total area of 852,853 square meters has 2709 people. Population density in Montazeri is 31 people per hectare.

Malek City:

The Malek city is located north of Fajr, along the Baharestan street, from the south to the Khiaban-e-Al-Hoda street and from the west to Mofattah Street.

The area of the neighborhood is 1874201 square meters, with 35,118 people living in this area. Population density is 187 people per hectare.

Negin Township:

In this town with an area of 801050 square meters, 10394 people live. The population density in Negin is 113 people per hectare.
