= Isfahan Mathematics House =

Information
- Website: www.isf.mathhouse.org

Isfahan Mathematics House (Persian:خانه ریاضیات اصفهان) is a non-formal education institute in Iran, focusing primarily on statistics, biology, physics, maths, AI, computer programming courses. Established 1998 mainly priority of the Isfahan mathematics house is to offer students training.
