= Isfahan Central Library and Information Center =

Library in Isfahan, Iran

Coordinates: 32.654028°N 51.67234°E

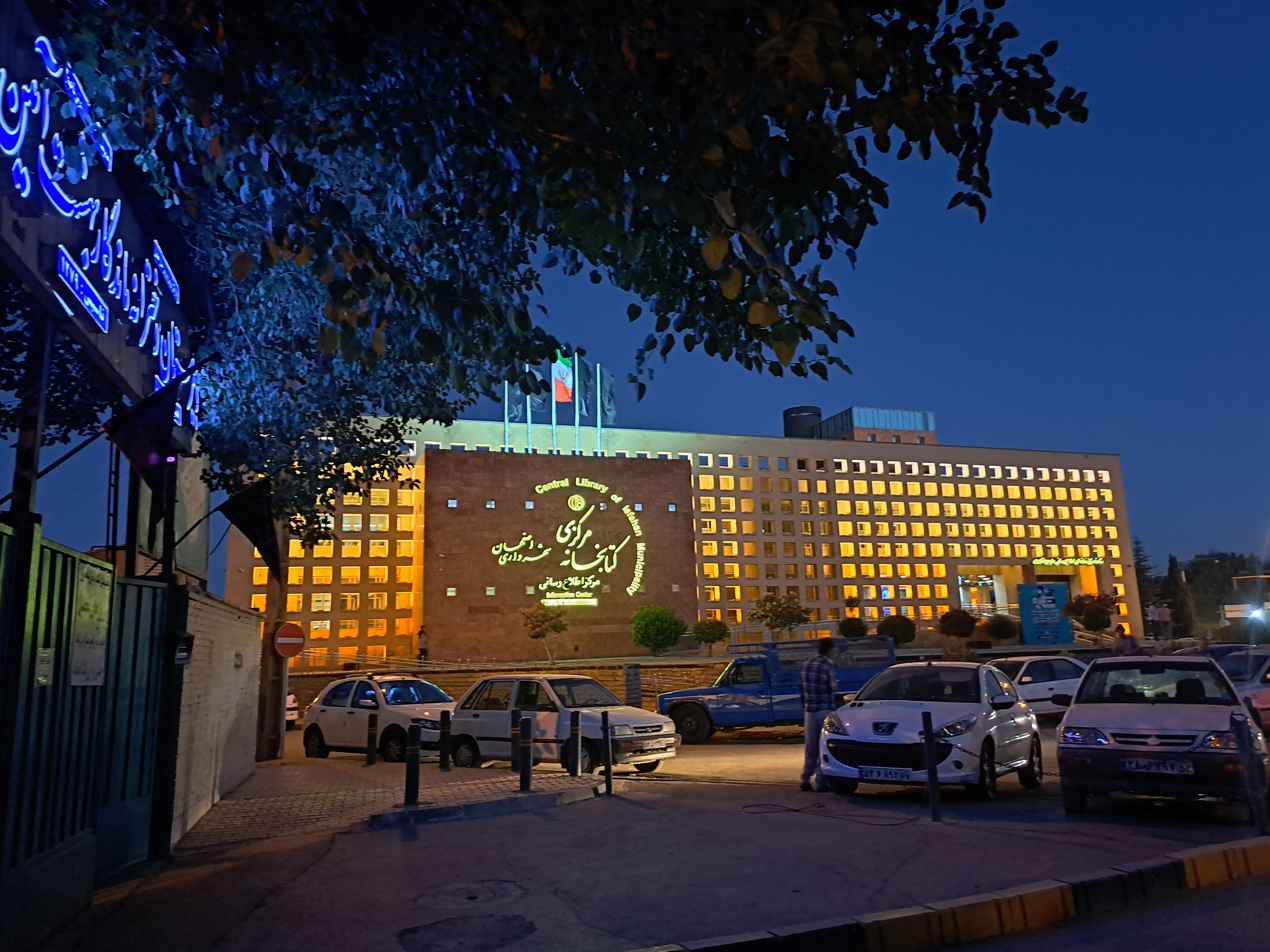
isfahan Municipality central library

Isfahan Central Library and Information Center (Persian: کتابخانه مرکزی و مرکز اطلاع رسانی اصفهان) is a library in the Iranian city of Isfahan. It is 12,000 square metres (130,000 sq ft), and houses 130,000 books.

It also has a book club, a media center, a publication section and keeps 6000 manuscripts documents.
