= Si-o-se-pol =

Double-level arch bridge located in Isfahan, Iran

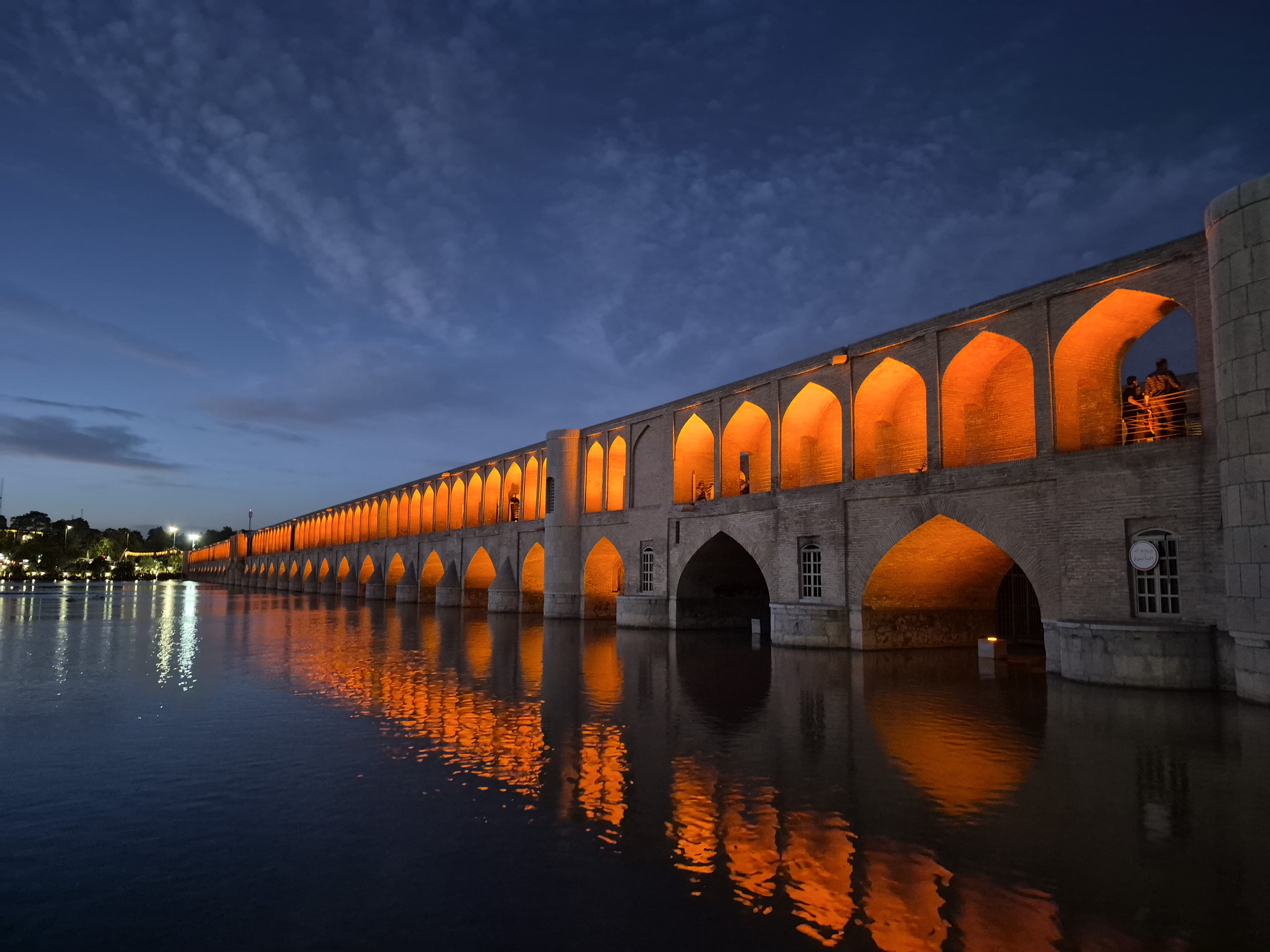
- Coordinates: 32°38′42″N 51°40′03″E
- Crosses: Zayanderud
- Locale: Isfahan, Iran

Characteristics
- Design: double-deck arch bridge
- Material: Stone and brick
- Total length: 297.76 metres (976.9 ft)
- Width: 14.75 metres (48.4 ft)
- Longest span: 5.60 metres (18.4 ft)
- No. of spans: 33

History
- Construction start: 1599
- Construction end: 1602

Location
- Interactive map of Si-o-se-pol

Si-o-se-pol
- Interactive map of Si-o-se-pol

Iran National Heritage List
- Official name: Allahverdi Khan Bridge
- Type: Bridge
- Designated: 1932
- Reference no.: 110
- Conservation organization: Cultural Heritage, Handicrafts and Tourism Organization of Iran

The Allahverdi Khan Bridge (Persian: پل الله‌وردی خان), popularly known as Si-o-se-pol (Persian: سی‌وسه‌پل, lit. '[the] bridge of thirty-three [spans]'), is the largest of the eleven historical bridges on the Zayanderud, the largest river of the Iranian Plateau, in Isfahan, Iran.

The bridge was built in the early 17th century to serve as both a bridge and a dam.

== History ==
Si-o-se-pol was built between 1599 and 1602, under the reign of Abbas the Great, the fifth shah of Safavid Iran. It was constructed under the supervision of Allahverdi Khan Undiladze, the commander-in-chief of the armies, who was of Georgian origin, and was also named after him. The bridge served particularly as a connection between the mansions of the elite, as well as a link to the city's vital Armenian neighborhood of New Julfa.

In years of drought (2000–02 and 2013), the river was dammed upstream to provide water for Yazd province.

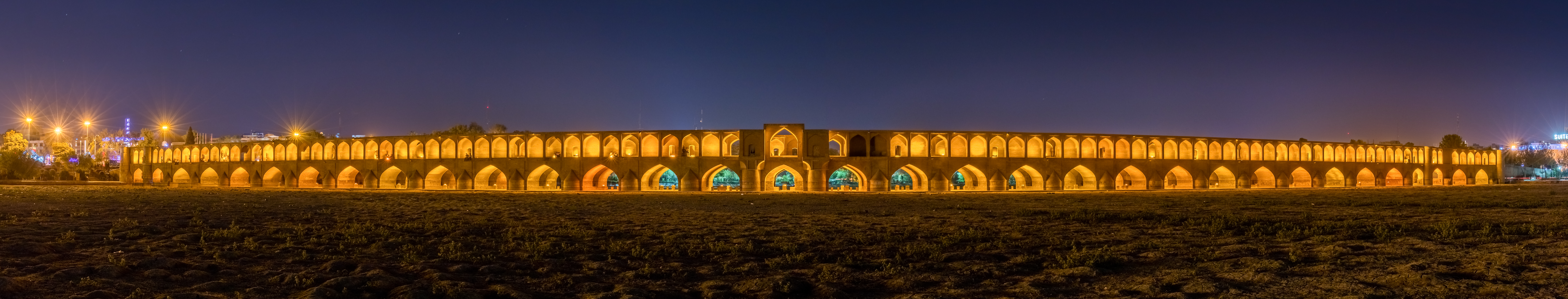
Panoramic photography of the bridge

== Structure ==
The bridge has a total length of 297.76 metres (976.9 ft) and a total width of 14.75 metres (48.4 ft). It is a vaulted arch bridge consisting of two superimposed rows of 33 arches, from whence its popular name of Si-o-se-pol comes, and is made of stone. The longest span is about 5.60 metres (18.4 ft). The interior of Si-o-se-pol was originally decorated with paintings, which were often described by travelers as erotic.

== Gallery ==
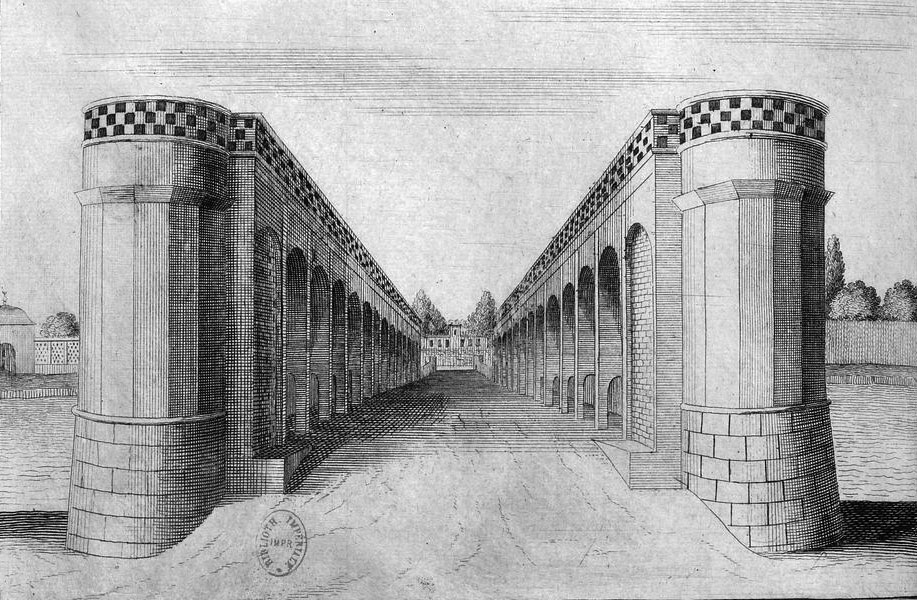
A 17th-century drawing of Si-o-se-pol by Jean Chardin.

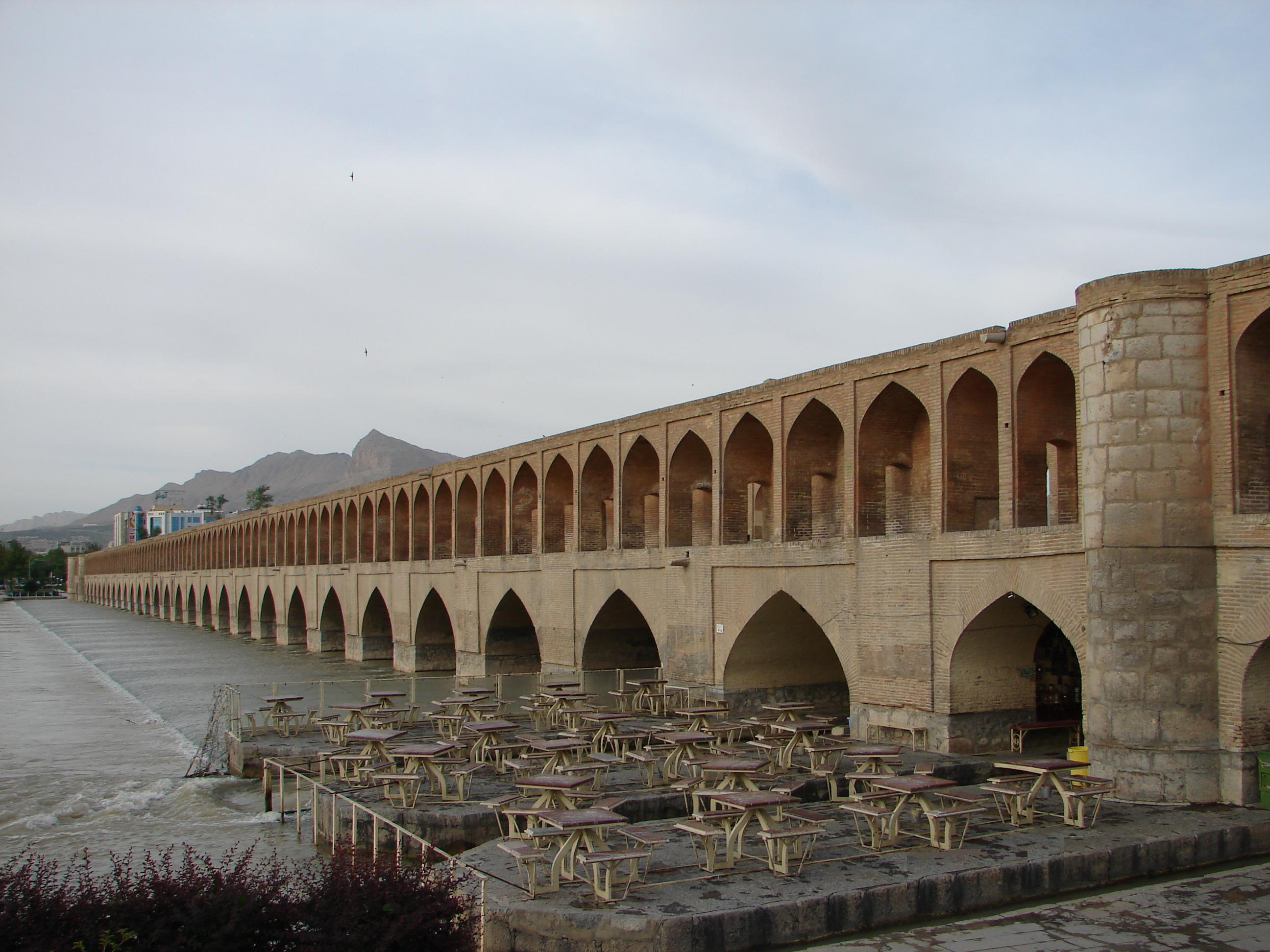
Benches and tables next to Si-o-se-pol.

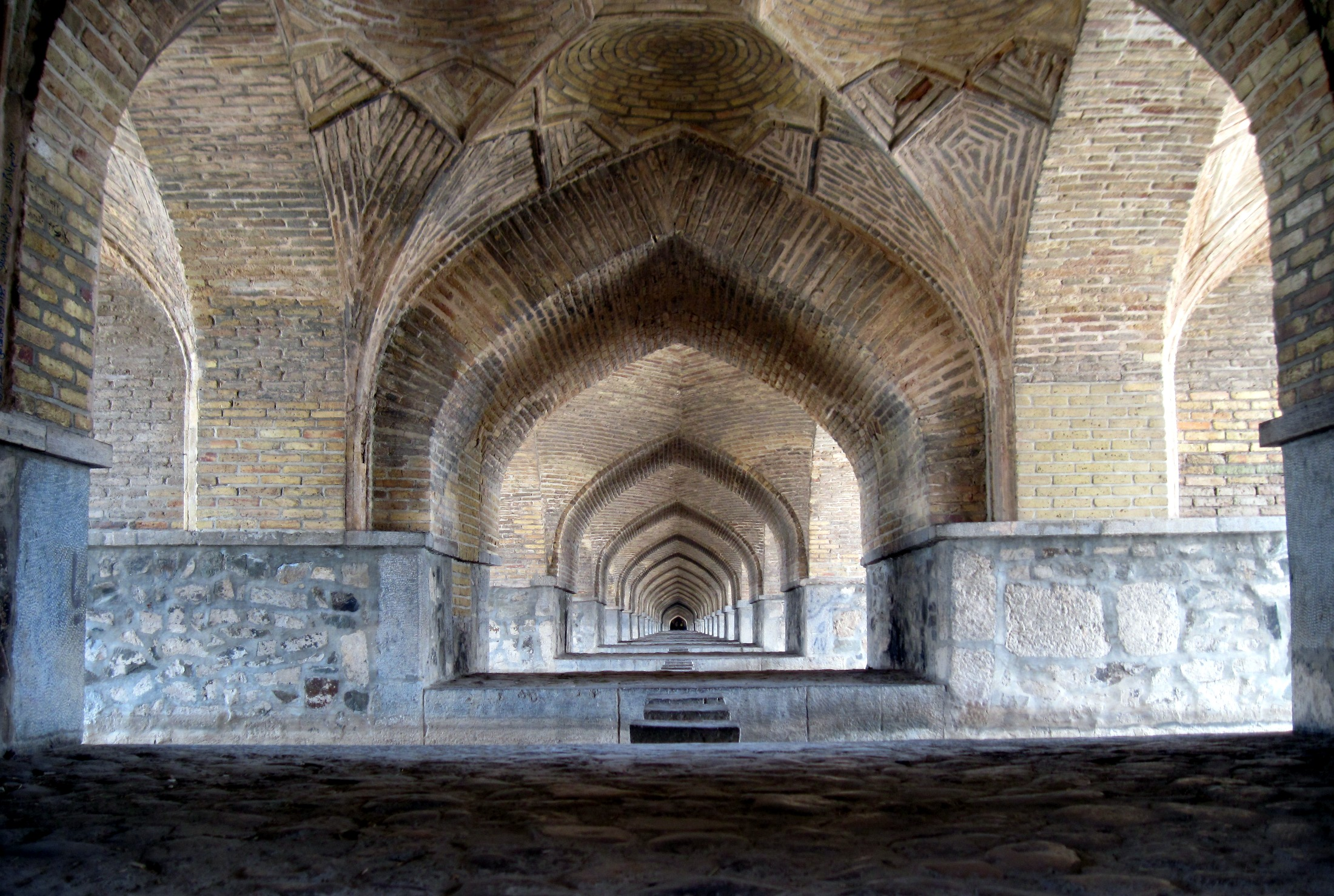
A view of the arches under Si-o-se-pol.

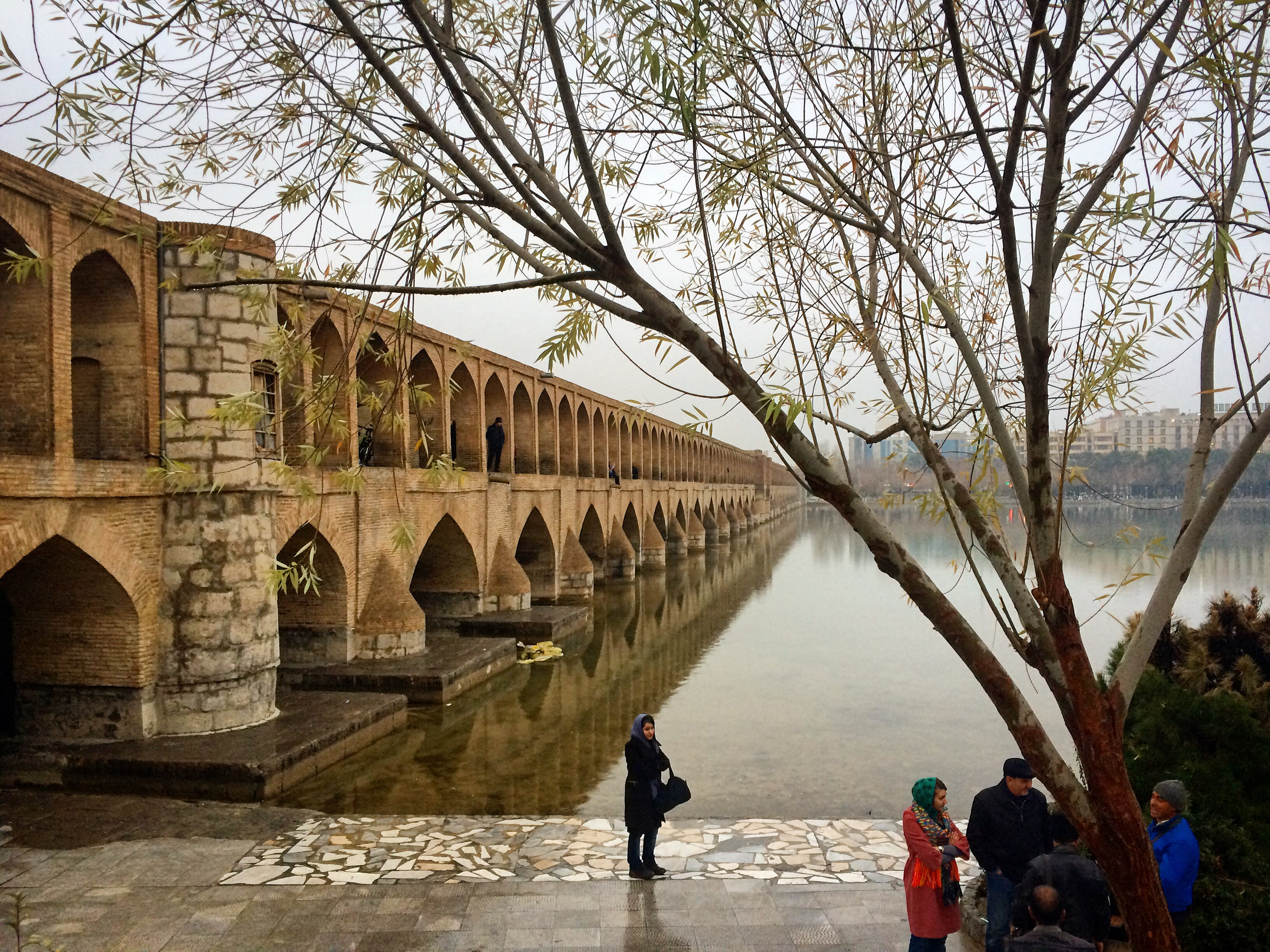
Si-o-se-pol in December 2015.

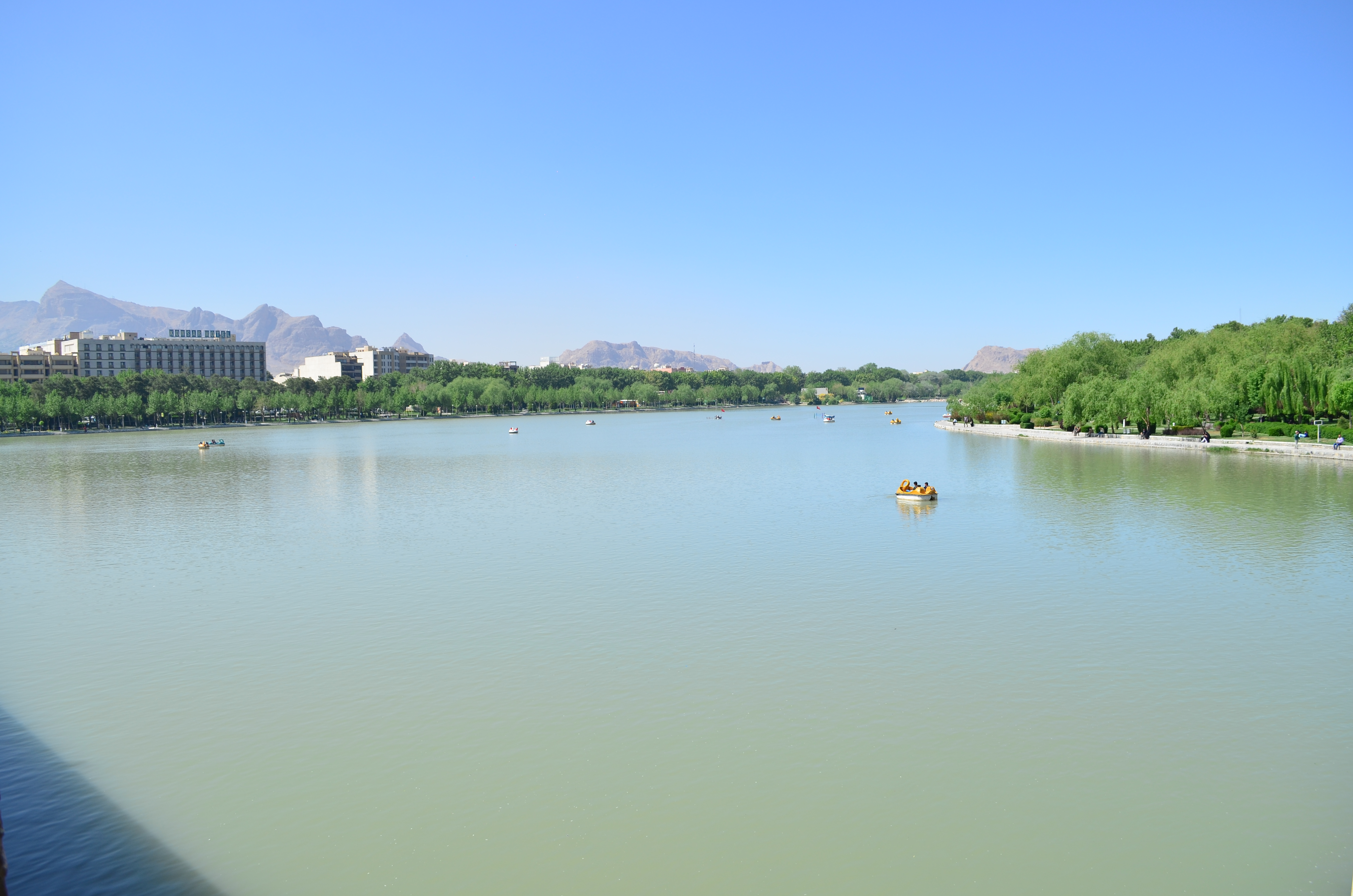
Si-o-se-pol's view of the Zayanderud.

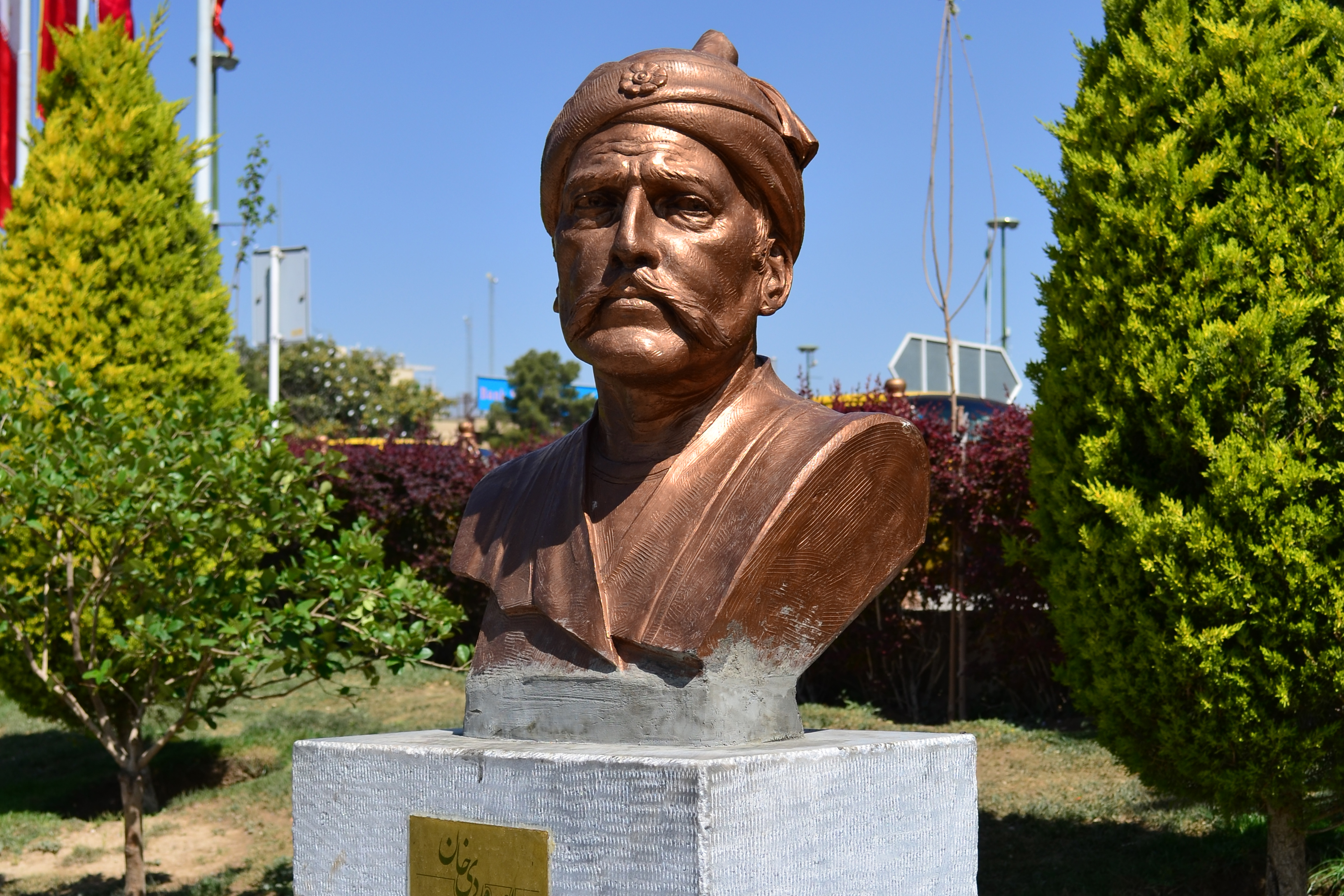
The statue of Allahverdi Khan, next to the bridge.

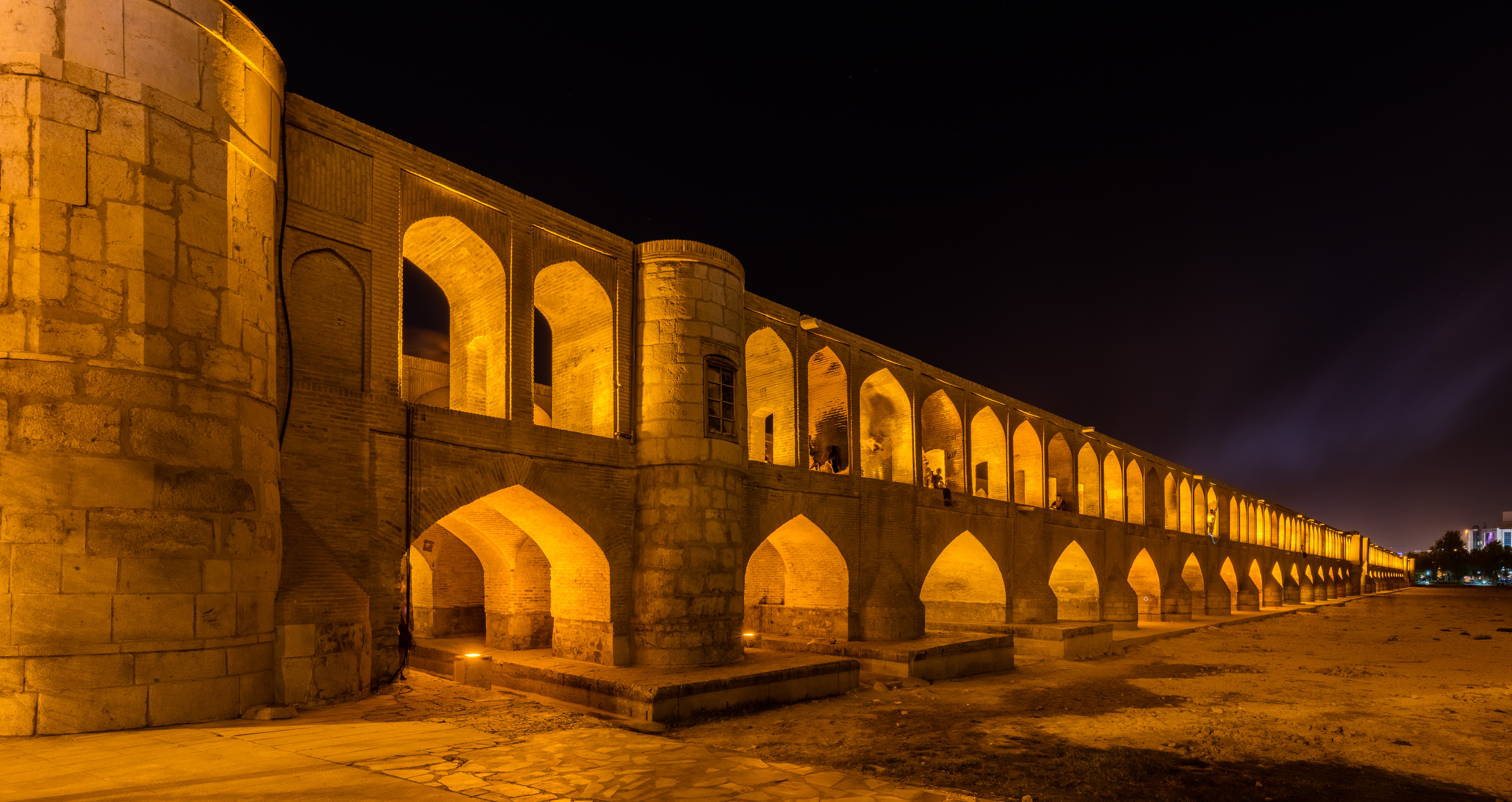
Si-o-se-pol at night.

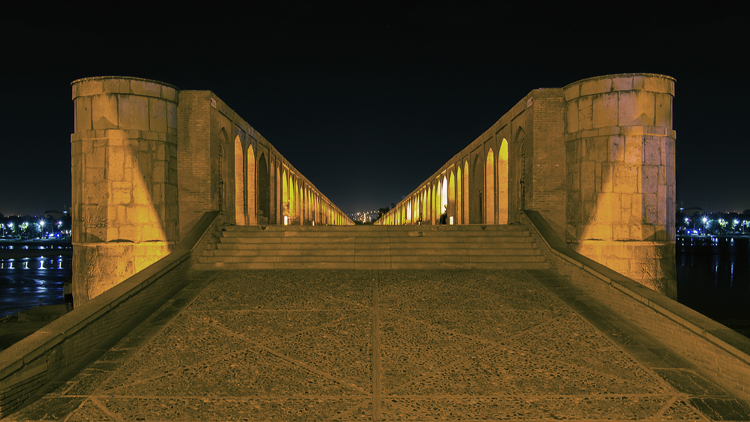
Si-o-se-pol's walkway at night.

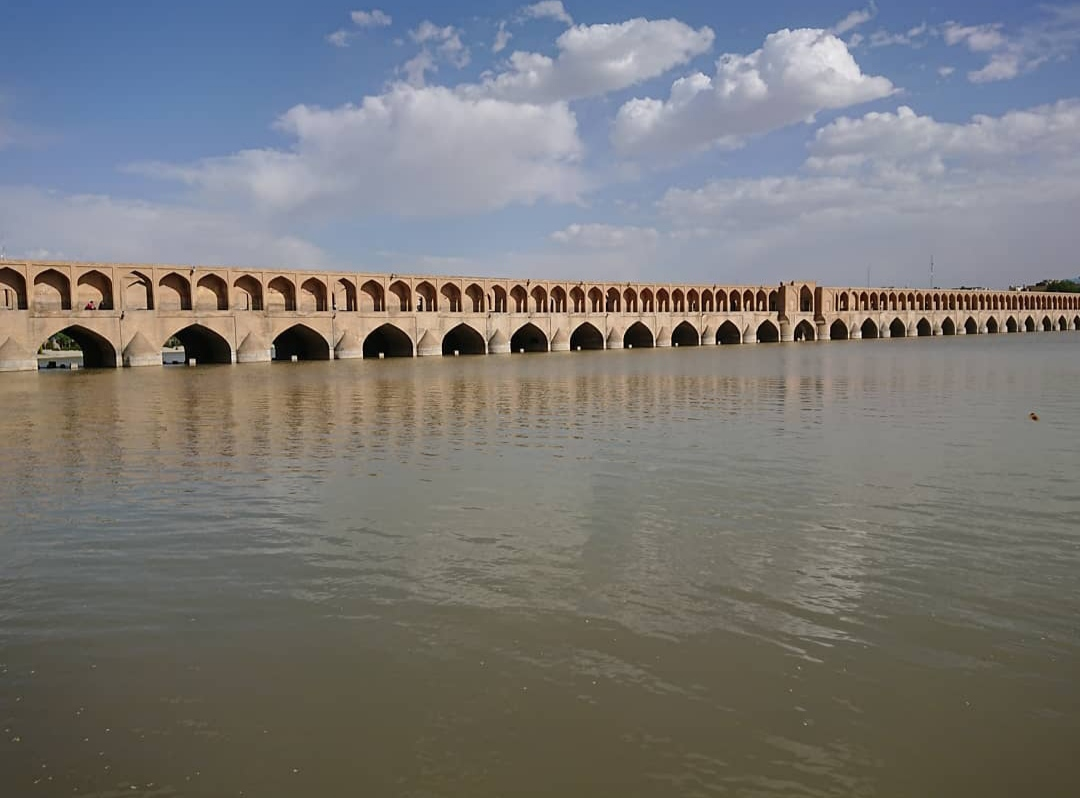
April 2019

== Transportation ==
- Chaharbagh Street
- Motahari Street
- Kamaloddin Esmaeil Street
- Chahar Bagh Bala Street
- Mellat Street
- Ayenekhaneh Street
- Enqelab Metro Station
- Si-o-se Pol Metro Station

== See also ==
- Risbaf factory
