= Chaharbagh, Isfahan =

Historical avenue in Isfahan, Iran

Chaharbagh Boulevard
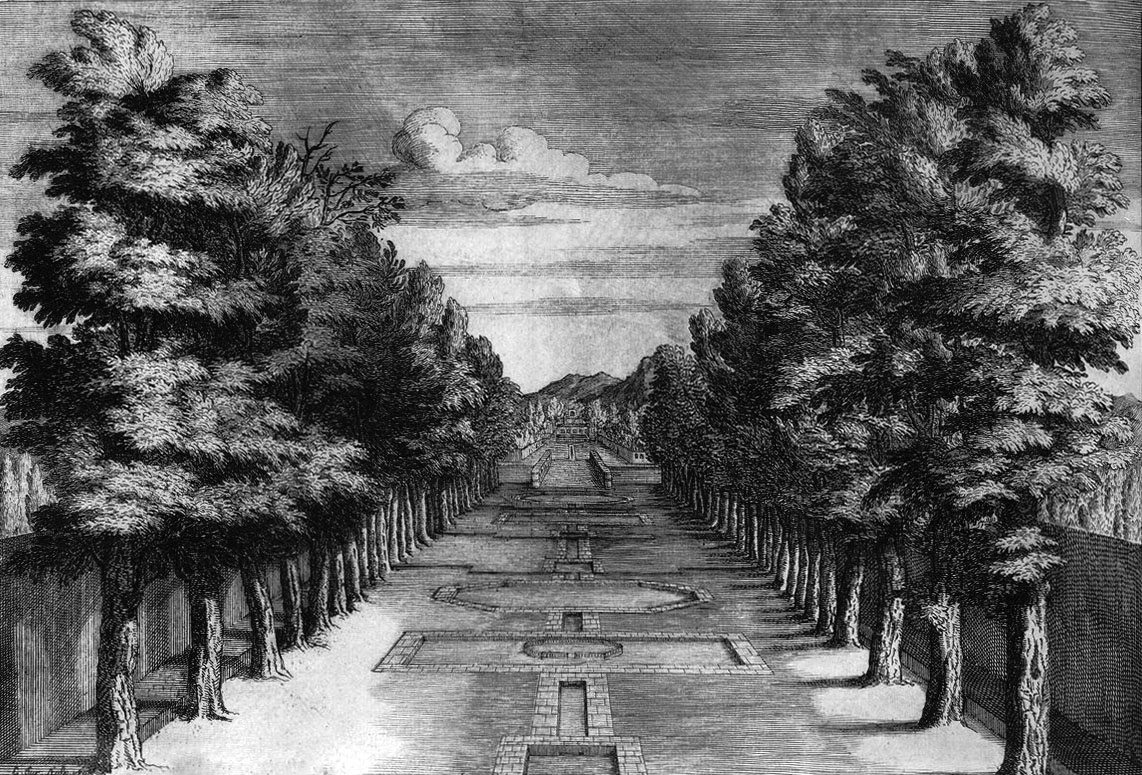
- 1670s, by Jean Chardin

- Location within Iran
- 32°39′11″N 51°40′07″E
- Location: Isfahan, Iran

Iran National Heritage List
- Official name: Chaharbagh Boulevard
- Type: Boulevard
- Designated: 1932
- Reference no.: 109
- Conservation organization: Cultural Heritage, Handicrafts and Tourism Organization of Iran

Chahar Bagh Boulevard (Persian: خیابان چهارباغ, lit. 'Four Gardens' Street') is a historic avenue in Isfahan constructed during the Safavid era. This historic street is very similar to the Champs-Élysées in Paris. Therefore, some visitors have called it the Champs-Élysées of Isfahan.

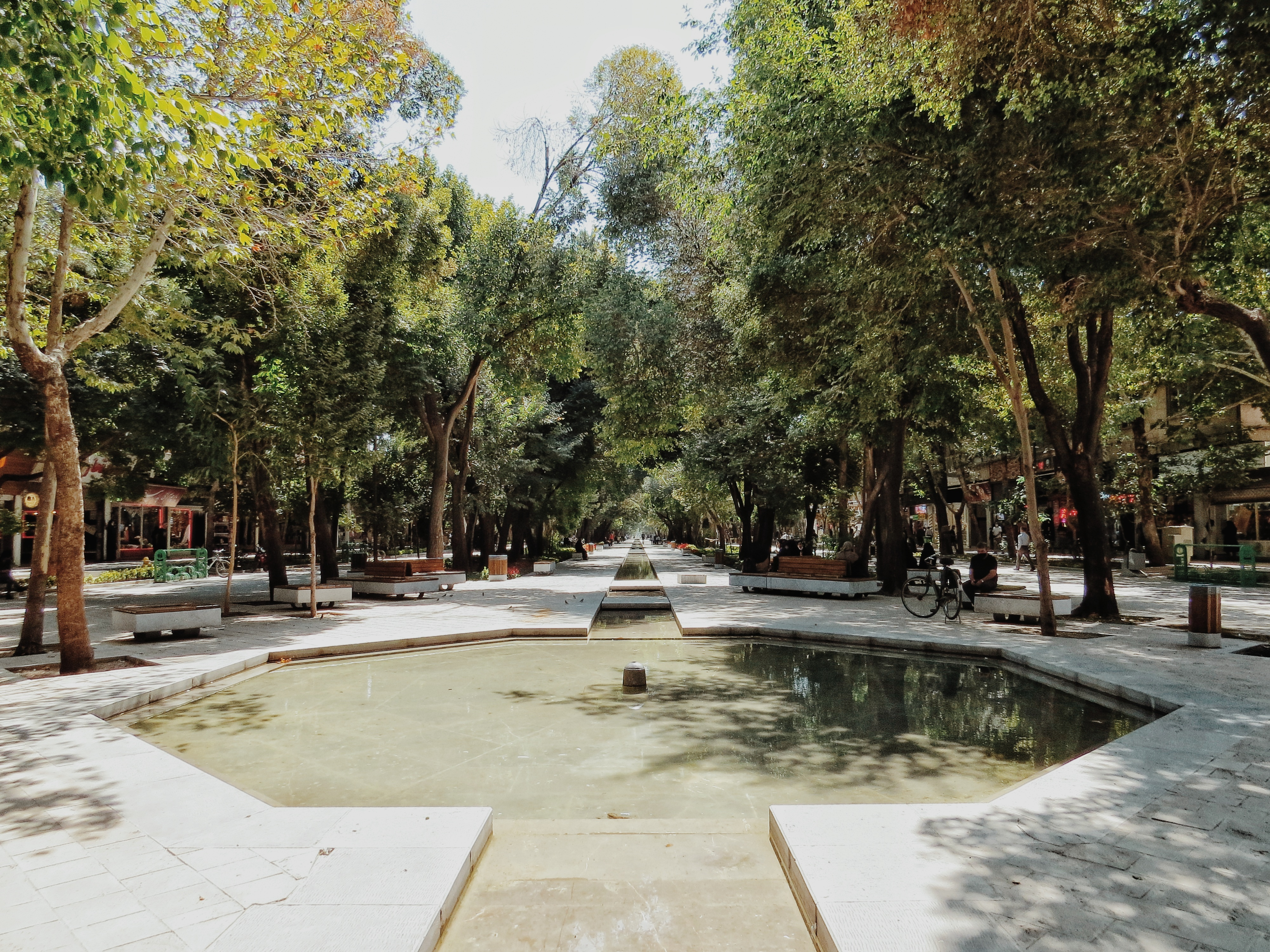
2020

The avenue, historically, is the most famous in all of Iran. It connects Isfahan's northern parts to the southern sections and is about 6 kilometers long. On the east side of this street, there are the Hasht Behesht and Chehel Sotoun gardens.

== Origin of name ==
The avenue was named "Chahar Bagh" because Shah Abbas the Great had bought four vineyards in the city to secure the right-of-way.

== History ==
Shah Abbas I changed his capital from Qazvin to Isfahan and decided to concentrate the country's artistic wealth into that central spot which has been dubbed for centuries "Nesf-e Jahan" or "Half the World". The chief architect of this task of urban planning was Shaykh Bahai (Baha' ad-Din al-'Amili), who focused the programme on two key features of Shah Abbas's master plan: the Chahar Bagh avenue, flanked at either side by all the prominent institutions of the city, such as the residences of all foreign dignitaries, and the Naqsh-e Jahan Square ("Exemplar of the World"). After the opening of the enghelab metro station, chaharbagh abbasi, the middle section of avenue, was pedestrianised.

== Sections ==
Chahar Bagh Street
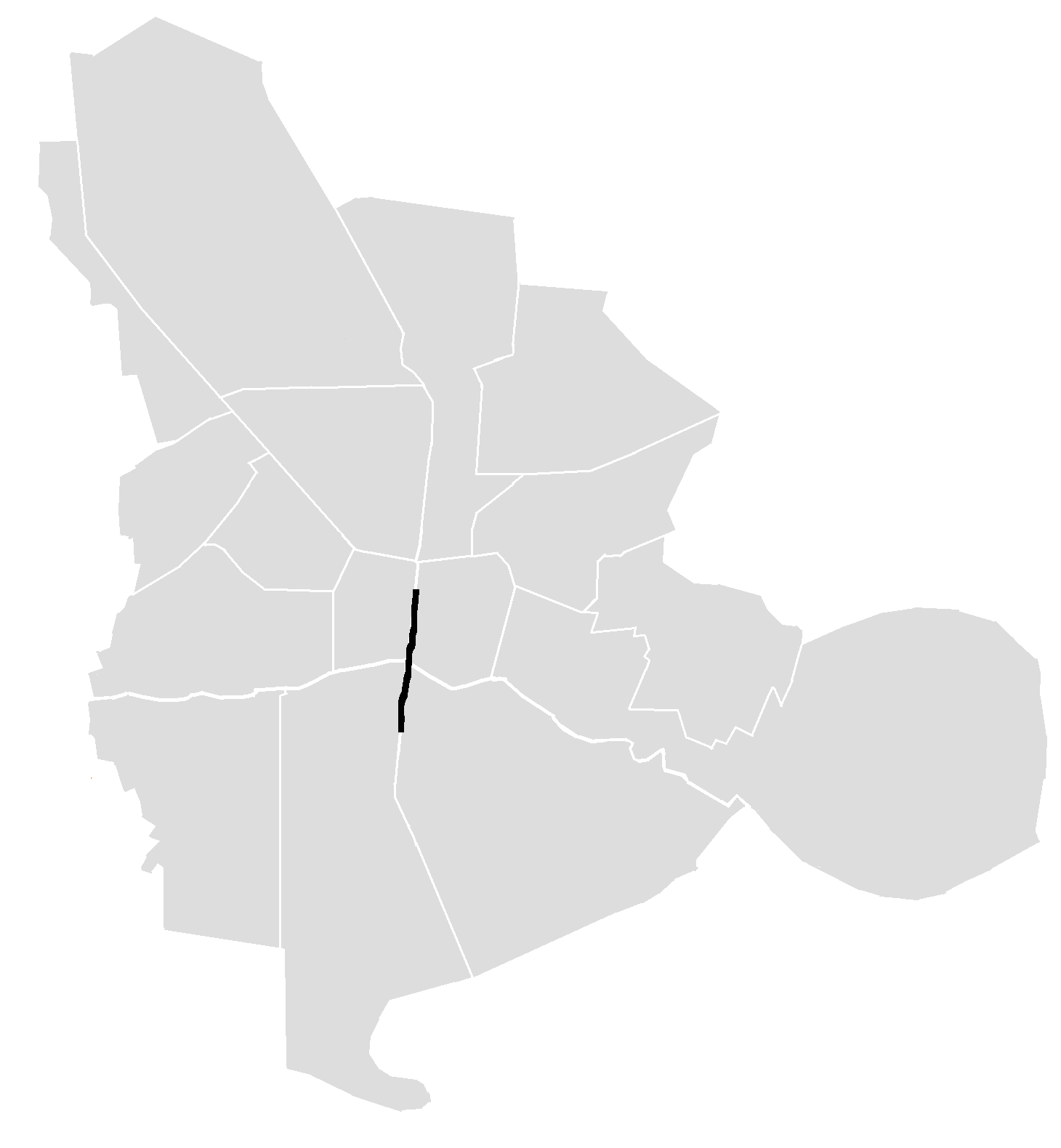
- Interactive map of Chahar Bagh Street
- Native name: خيابان چهار باغ (Persian)
- Length: 5.5 km (3.4 mi)
- Location: Isfahan
- North end: Shohada Squrare
- South end: Azadi Squrare

=== Chaharbagh Pa'in ===
Chaharbagh Pa'in, or lower Chaharbagh, (Persian: چهارباغ پایین) is the northern section of the avenue. This part of Chaharbagh is from Shohada Square to Darvazeh Dowlat.

Detailed characteristics
From North to South
Continues as: Kaveh Boulevard
Shohada Square	Foruqi Street; Ebn-e Sina Street; Modares Street Shohada Metro Station
Takhti Junction	Masjed-e Seyyed Street; Abdorrazaq Street Takhti Metro Station
Imam Hosein Square	Sepah Street; Bagh Goldasteh Street; Taleqani Street; Babolrahmat Street Imam Hossein Metro Station
Continues as: Chaharbagh Abbasi
From South to North

=== Chaharbagh Abbasi ===
Chaharbagh Abbasi, (Persian: چهارباغ عباسی) is the middle section of the avenue. This part of Chaharbagh is from Darvazeh Dowlat to Northern 33 pol at Enqelab Square.

Detailed characteristics
From North to South
Continues as: Chaharbagh Pa'in
Imam Hosein Square	Sepah Street; Bagh Goldasteh Street; Taleqani Street; Babolrahmat Street Imam Hossein Metro Station
	Sheykh Bahaei
	Amadegah Street
	Abbasabad Street
Enqelab Square	Si-o-se Pol; Motahari Street; Kamaloddin Esmaeil Street Enqelab Metro Station
From South to North

=== Chaharbagh Bala ===
Chaharbagh Bala, or upper Chaharbagh, (Persian: چهارباغ بالا) is the southern section of the avenue. This part of Chaharbagh is from southern 33 pol to Azadi Square.

Detailed characteristics
From North to South
	Si-o-se Pol; Mellat Street; Ayenekhaneh Street
Si-o-se Pol Metro Station
Nazar Junction	Nazar Street; Mir Fendereski Street
Shari'ati Metro Station
	Shari'ati Street; Nikbakht Street
Azadi Metro Station
Azadi Square	Azadegan Boulevard; Daneshgah Boulevard
Continues as: Hezar Jarib Boulevard
From South to North
