= Kaveh-ye Vosta =

Kaveh-ye Vosta كاوه وسطي
- Village
- Location within Iran
- Coordinates: 34°11′58″N 47°50′32″E
- Country: Iran
- Province: Lorestan
- County: Delfan
- Bakhsh: Kakavand
- Rural District: Kakavand-e Sharqi

Population (2006)
  - Total: 40
- Time zone: UTC+3:30 (IRST)
  - Summer (DST): UTC+4:30 (IRDT)

Kaveh-ye Vosta (Persian: كاوه وسطي, also Romanized as Kāveh-ye Vosţá; and Deh-e Vosţá) is a village in Kakavand-e Sharqi Rural District, Kakavand District, Delfan County, Lorestan Province, Iran. At the 2006 census, its population was 40, in 9 families.
