= District 3, Isfahan =

Coordinates: 32.669762°N 51.693563°E

Government
  - Body: Isfahan City Council
- Website: https://mun3.isfahan.ir/fa/node/5799

District 3 (Persian: منطقه سه شهرداري اصفهان or منطقه 3 شهر اصفهان) is a district in the Iranian city of Isfahan. It has an area of 1148 hectares and is the tourism entry point of Isfahan city. It is a central business district. It hosts twenty seven thousand stores in Grand Isfahan market alone.

The district has one fire station and two fire departments under development. This district has a subway station.

Two hundred and thirty nine mosques are in this district, along with thirteen libraries, eight gymnasiums and five pools, three parks and four zurkhanehs.

== Buildings ==
Government buildings in this district include Isfahan Municipality Education department, IRIB, Ministry of Foreign Affairs branch office and Isfahan provincial government.

- Three minarets
- Moshtagh park
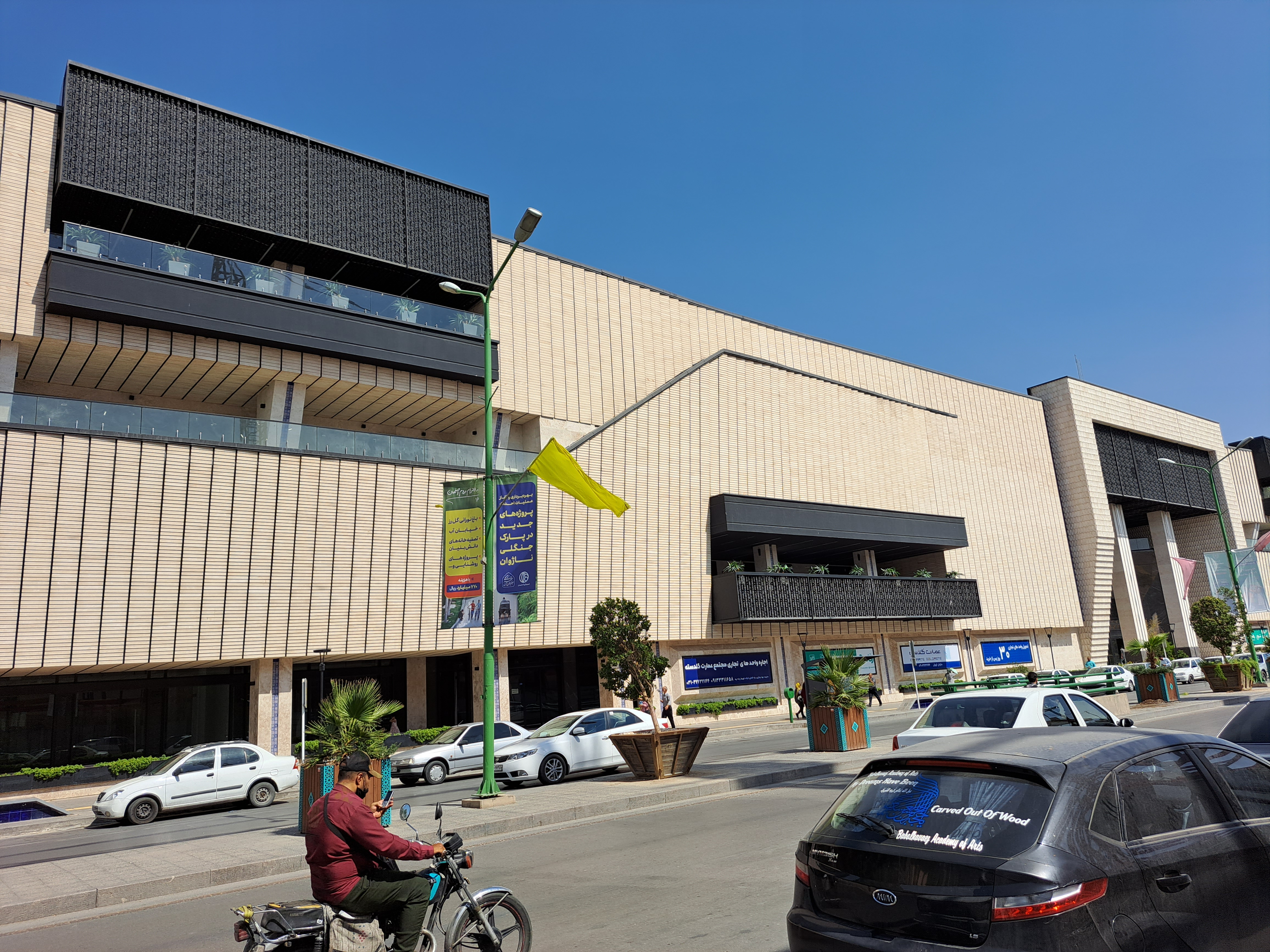
- Amadega
- Moshir street
- Isfahan Central Library
- Ferdowsi bridge
- Hasht Behesht
- Khaju Bridge
- Si-o-se-pol
- Naghshe Jahan square

== Zones ==
The district has fourteen neighbourhood regions:

- Naghshe Jahan neighborhood (or Safavid) - محله نقش جهان یا صفویه,
- Ahmad abad -محله احمدآباد ,
- Charkhab (Pasdaran) -چرخاب ,
- Juybare - جویباره,
- Sartave - سرتاوه,
- Sarcheshme - سرچشمه,
- Shahshahan - شهشهان,
- Khaju -خواجو,
- Malek -ملک,
- Gulzar - گلزار,
- Qale Tabare - قلعه طبره,
- Emamzade Ismail امامزاده اسماعیل,
- Sunbolostan سنبلستان
