= District 1, Isfahan =

Place in Iran

District 1, Isfahan شهرداری منطقه یک
- Coordinates: 32.642672°N 51.644525°E

Range of boundaries of District 1 are from Shohada Square in the north, Enghelab square in south till Vahid bridge, East from Charbagh to Enghelab Square, in the west from Vahid bridge until ( Meidan Jomhori Eslami )Islamic republic square.

District 1 is a 810 hectare area.

There are three subway stations.

== List of neighborhoods ==
Saeb; Abbas Abad; Lenban; Prince Ibrahim; Bidabad, its other name in Arabic sources is Wizabad, it was also called Sheesh, Bidabad and Ten Sheesh.; The door of the kiosk; Jami; Ali Qoli, sir; Khalja neighborhood; Jozdan Eliadra	صائب; عباس‌آباد; لنبان; شاهزاده ابراهیم; بیدآباد نام دیگر آن داخل منابع عربی ویذآباد است، به آن شیش و بیدآباد و ده شیش هم می‌گفتند.; درب کوشک; جامی; علی قلی آقا; محله خلجا; جوزدان الیادران

== Amenities ==
- There are 79 mosques, 4 parks including 430,000 meters of green, ten playgrounds, 7 libraries, nine art centers, three pools, three gymnasiums.
- Bicycle lane.
- Social hub in Jammi street
- Chaharbagh walkway
- Jahan-Nama Tower

Maadi Niasarm.
