= Hasseh =

Neighborhood in Isfahan province, Iran

Hasseh Persian: حصه
- Neighborhood
- Location within Iran
- Coordinates: 32°42′24″N 51°45′09″E
- Country: Iran
- Province: Isfahan
- County: Isfahan
- District: Central
- City: Isfahan

Population (2011)
  - Total: 11,254
- Time zone: UTC+3:30 (IRST)

Hasseh (Persian: حصه) (Note: Also romanized as Ḩaşeh, Ḩaşşeh, and Ḩasseh; also known as Hasteh and Shahrak ol Mahdī) is a neighborhood in the city of Isfahan in the Central District of Isfahan County, Isfahan province, Iran.

== Demographics ==
=== Population ===
At the time of the 2006 National Census, Hasseh's population was 10,942 in 2,652 households, when it was a village in Qahab-e Shomali Rural District. The following census in 2011 counted 11,254 people in 2,998 households. After the census, the village was annexed by the city of Isfahan.
