= District 7, Isfahan =

Coordinates: 32.694117°N 51.676867°E

District 7, Isfahan شهرداری منطقه هفت 7 اصفهان
- Interactive map of District 7, Isfahan

Area
  - Total: 1,357 ha (3,350 acres)

District 7 has 12 main neighborhoods and is located north east of the city of Isfahan. The district was formed out of district 3 in 1981 it was broken up into another district 14 in 2008(1387 ) .

Total area of the land under district administration is 2857 hectare. There are fifty mosques, four libraries, seven parks, one pool and six gymnasiums. Social status average three out of four neighborhoods is 3.98.

== List of neighborhoods ==
- Babul Dasht - بابلدشت - This is one of the ancient historic areas of the city.
- Sheikh Eshragh - شیخ‌اشراق
- Barazandeh - برازنده - Golestan Street
- Bagh Fadak - باغ فدك - In 1995 the tourism project was built with 85 hectare garden on Farzanegan Avenue.
- Koye Kaveh- کوی کاوه
- Shahrak Milad - کوی میلاد
- Koye Valiasr - کوی ولی عصر عج
- Farvardin - فروردين
- Shahed - شاهد
- Mulavi - مولوي
- Puriaie Vali- پورياي ولي
- Rahim Abad - رحیم آباد - This village succeeded from Burkhar county district.

== Landmarks ==
There is a dedicated full vaccination center.

It has an Al Mohamad library study.
