= Kave Terminal =

Kave Terminal, developed in 1990, is a bus terminal in Isfahan, Iran operated by municipality. It is one of the major terminals along with Soffeh terminal, Jey terminal, Zayanderud terminal and Samadie. There is a program to relocate the terminal to a zone with less traffic. It moves around 12 thousand passengers a day. It's adjacent to central subway station.
