= District 12, Isfahan =

- Coordinates: 32.716286°N 51.632788°E

Area
  - Total: 8,223 ha (20,319 acres)

District 12 is the largest district in the Iranian city of Isfahan, located in the northwest.

Three neighborhoods in this district are among the city's most impoverished.

A business and commercial center tower project are under construction.

== Neighborhoods ==
- Malekshahr - Most populated neighborhood within district
- Khaneh Esfahan
- Baharestan (not the same Baharestan neighborhood south of Isfahan)
- Mahmoud Abad industrial district zone of the city محمودآباد
- Ashegh Abad
- Shahrake Ghods
