= Qods (Malek Shahr) Metro Station (Isfahan) =

Metro station in Isfahan, Iran

Qods Station

General information
- Location: Asheghabad; District 12, Isfahan; Iran
- Coordinates: 32°42′53″N 51°36′17″E
- Operator: Isfahan Urban and Suburban Railways Organization
- Line: 1
- Connections: Isfahan City Buses: 51 Jomhuri-Shahrak Kowsar

History
- Opened: 23 Mehr, 1394 H-Sh; 15 October 2015; 10 years ago

Services
Preceding station	Isfahan Metro	Following station
Terminus	Line 1	Baharestan towards Defa'-e Moqaddas
Location

Qods Metro Station is a station on Isfahan Metro Line 1. The station opened on 15 October 2015. It is located near Imam Khomeini Expressway at Shahrak-e Kowsar and Shahrak-e Qods neighbourhoods at Asheghabad area. It is the northern terminus of Line 1 of Isfahan metro. The next station is Baharestan Station.
