= Isfahan Metro =

Rapid transit system in Isfahan, Iran

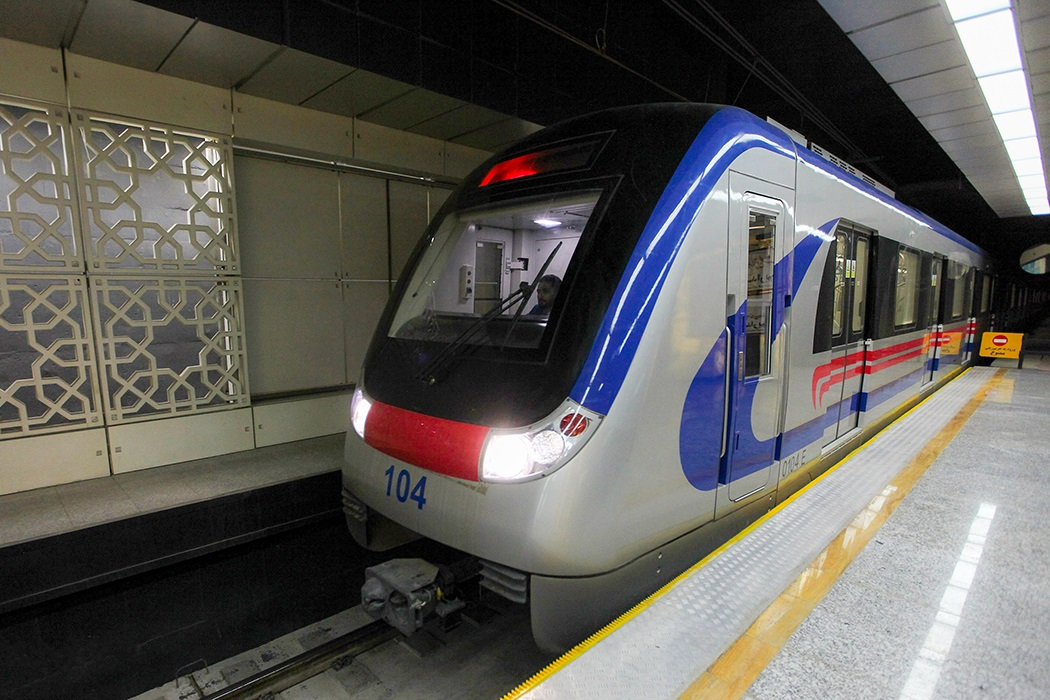

Overview
- Native name: Isfahan Urban and Suburban Railway قطار شهری اصفهان و حومه / Ghatār šahr-ye Eṣfahān va ḥūmeh
- Owner: Isfahan Municipality
- Locale: Isfahan, Greater Isfahan Region, Iran
- Transit type: Rapid transit
- Number of lines: 1 (2 under construction)
- Number of stations: 20
- Website: Urban Railway Organization; Isfahan Region's Metro Company

Operation
- Began operation: 15 October 2015; 11 years ago
- Operators: Isfahan Urban and Suburban Railway Organization; Isfahan Region's Metro Company

Technical
- System length: 20.2 km (12.6 mi)
- Track gauge: 1,435 mm (4 ft 8 1/2 in) standard gauge
System map
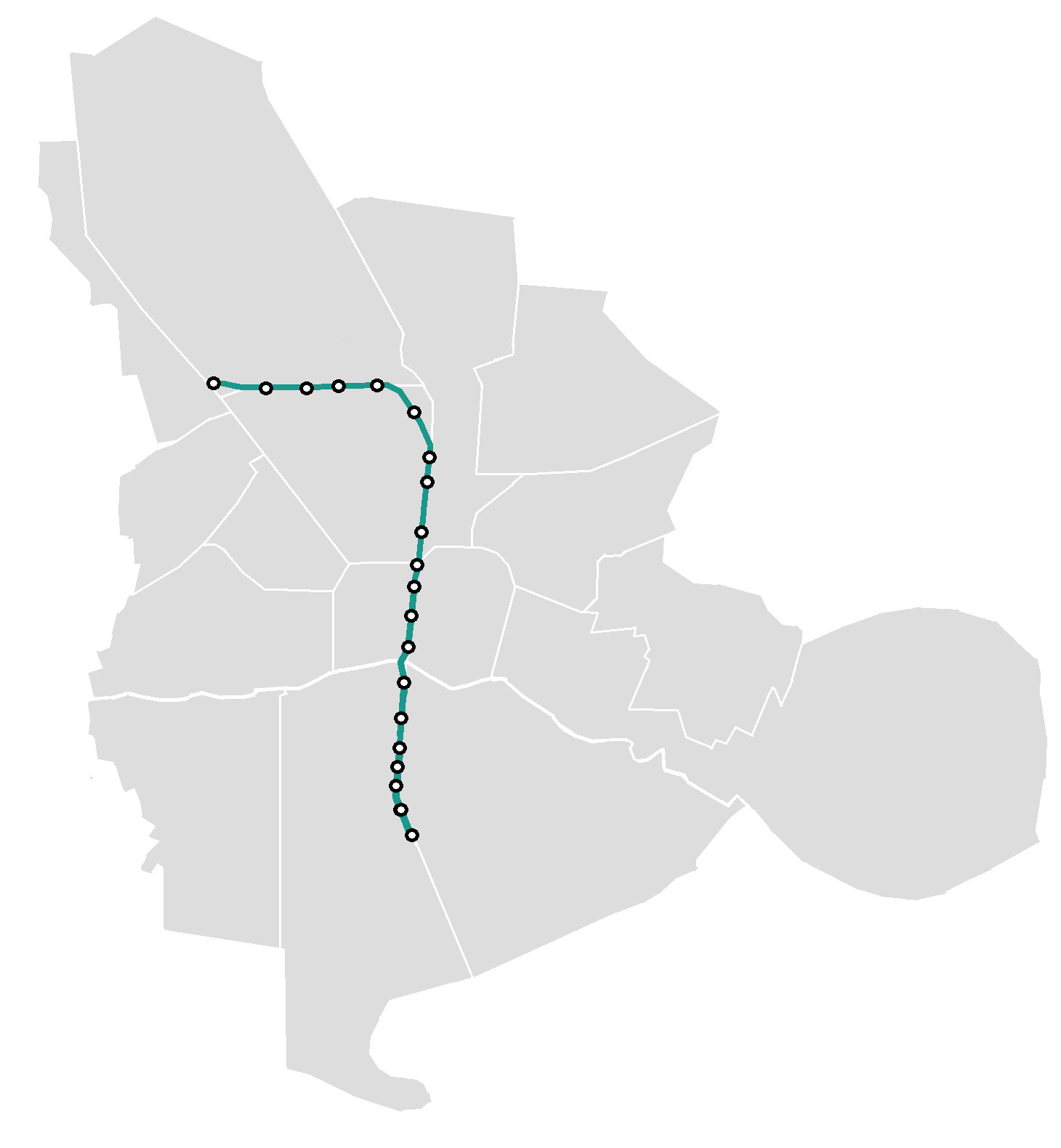

Isfahan Metro (Persian: متروی اصفهان, romanized: Metro-ye Eṣfahān) is a rapid transit system serving the city of Isfahan, Iran.

The first phase of Line 1 runs for 11 km (6.8 mi) from Qods in the northwest to Shohada via Kaveh long-distance bus terminal.

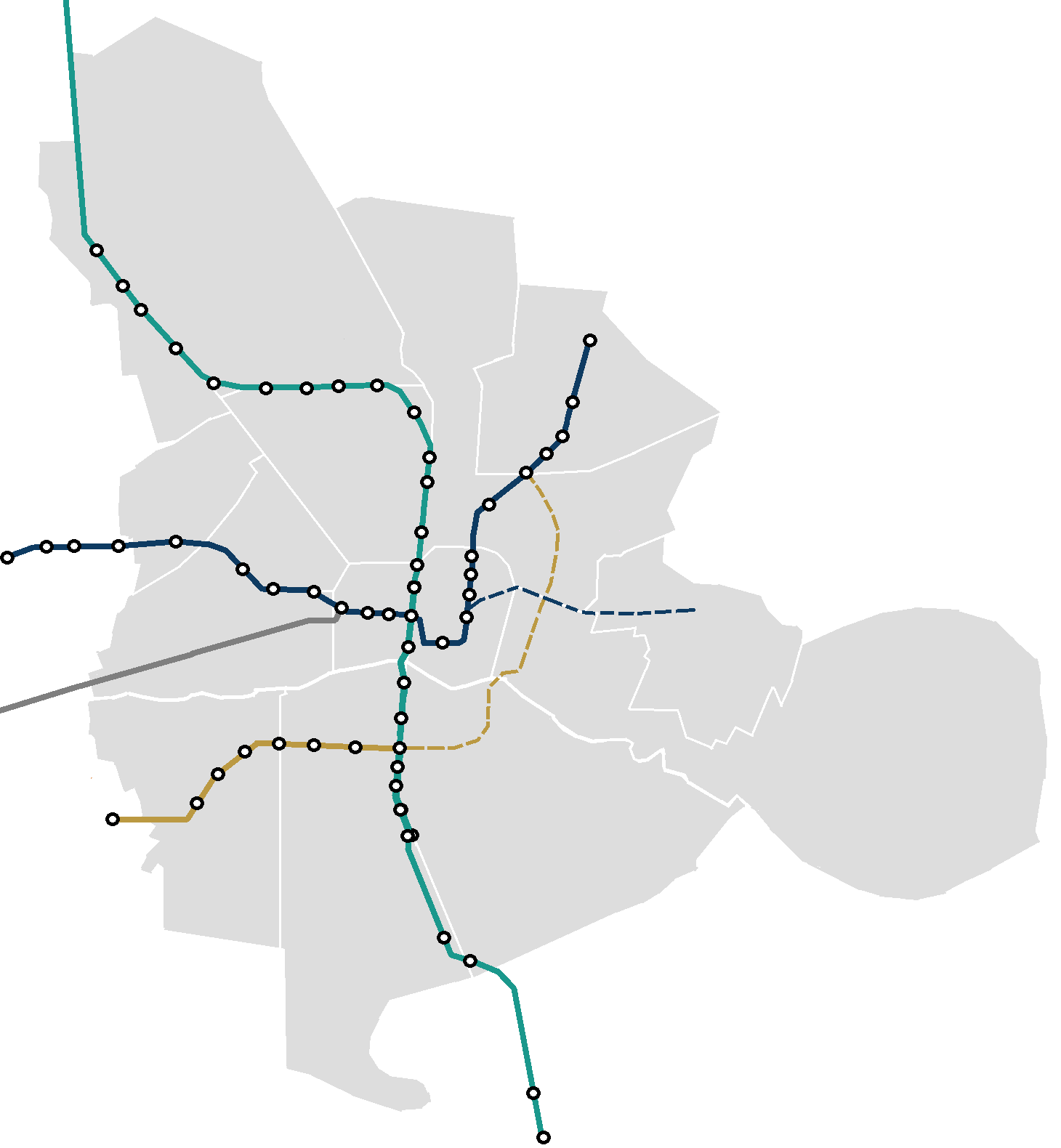
Prospective plan of the subway

== Lines ==
=== Line 1 ===
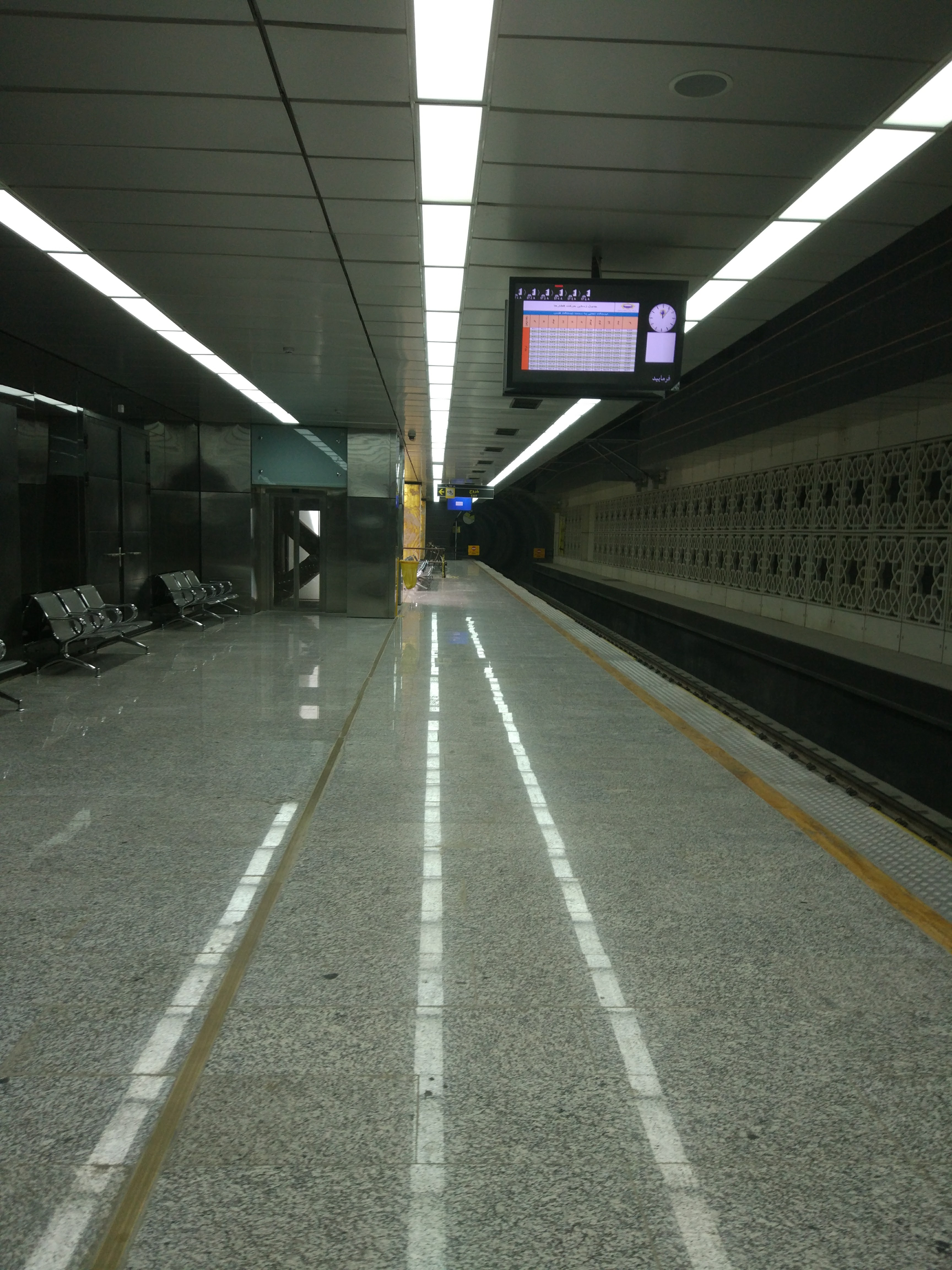
Takhti Metro Station

Line 1 (Green/Turquoise) is a north to south line that runs for 11 km (6.8 mi) from Qods to Shohada via Kaveh long-distance bus terminal. There are 20 stations: Ashegh Abad (Qods), Baharestan, Golestan, Shahid Mofateh, Shahid Alikhani, Jaber, Kaveh, Shahid Chamran, Shahid Bahonar, Meydan Shohada, Takhti, Meydan-e- Emam Hossein (darvazeh Dolat), Meydan-e- Enghelab, Si-o-se-pol, Doctor Shariati, Meydan-e-Azadi, Daneshgah (University), Kargar, Kuy-e-Emam (khabgah) and Defa-e- Moghadas (Payeneh Soffeh). Not all stations are in service at the moment.

The line was opened for commercial services on 15 October 2015. Construction commenced in 2001 but was subject to multiple delays.

The next phase would extend the line south from Shohada to the Soffeh long-distance bus terminal; in the longer term extensions are planned at both ends.

=== Line 2 ===
Line 2 (blue) is planned to be an east–west line.

=== Line 3 ===
Line 3 (Gold) is planned to run in the south of the city in its first stage.

=== Suburban rail ===
Three suburban rail lines are planned to feed the metro.

== See also ==
- Transportation in Isfahan
