= Barvikha (disambiguation) =

- Barvikha is a village in Odintsovsky District of Moscow Oblast, Russia; serving as a health resort of the President of Russia

Barvikha may also refer to:

- Barvikha (settlement), Odintsovsky District, Moscow Oblast, a settlement in Odintsovsky District of Moscow Oblast, Russia
- Barvikha Castle, alternative name of Meyendorff Castle in Russia
