= Skolkovo =

Skolkovo may refer to:

- Skolkovo Foundation, an organization in Russia charged with creating the Skolkovo innovation center
- Skolkovo Innovation Center, an emerging high-tech business area in Moscow, Russia
- Skolkovo Institute of Science and Technology, a private research university in Moscow, Russia
- Skolkovo Moscow School of Management, a graduate business school in Moscow, Russia
- Skolkovo (rural locality), name of several rural localities in Russia
  - Skolkovo, Moscow Oblast
