= Usovo, Moscow Oblast =

Usovo Усово
- Village
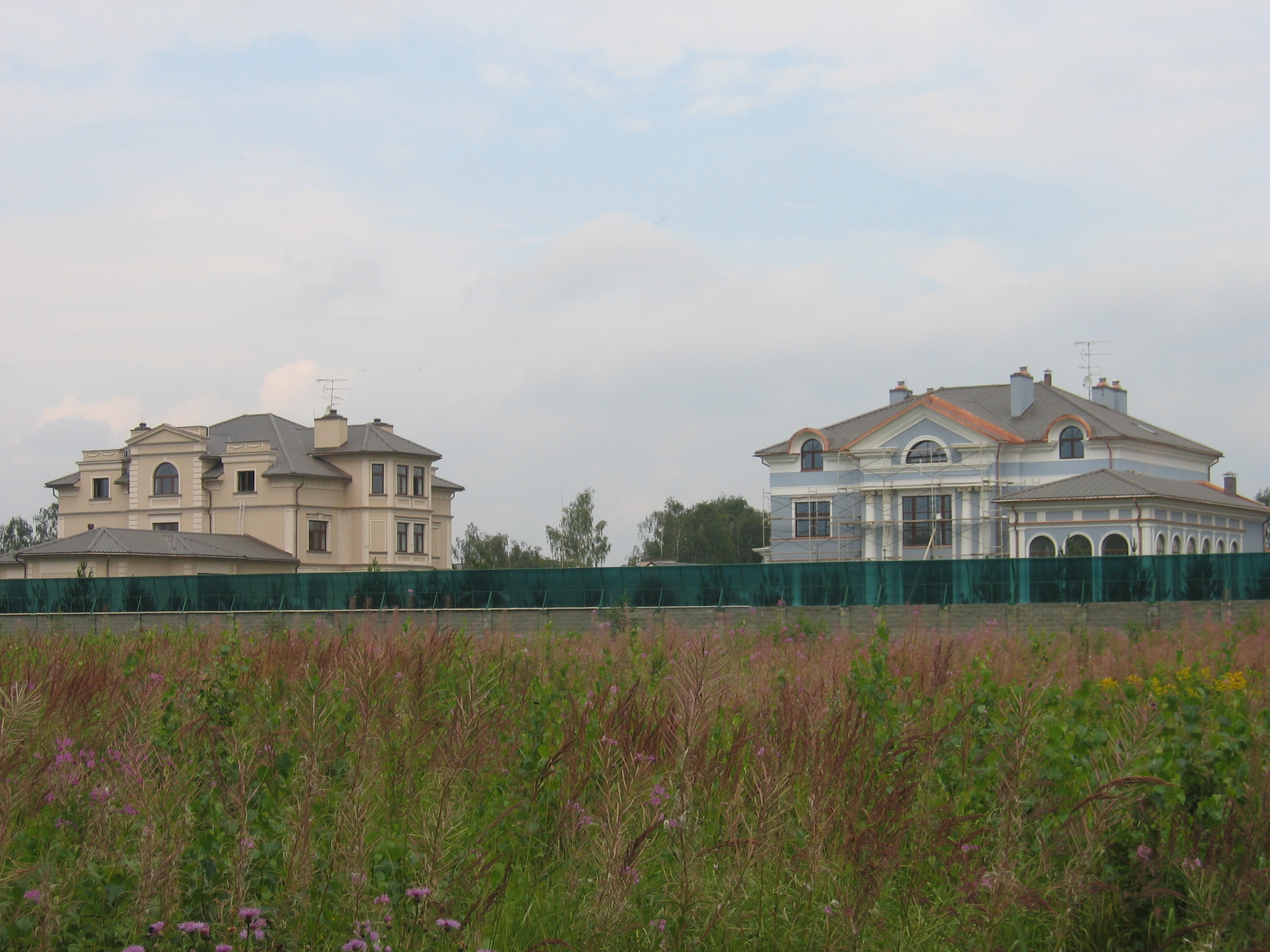
- Villas on the Rublevka road

- Location within Moscow Oblast Location within Russia
- Coordinates: 55°43′59″N 37°12′30″E
- Country: Russia
- Region: Moscow Oblast
- District: Odintsovsky District
- Time zone: UTC+3:00

Usovo (Russian: Усово) is a rural locality located in Barvikhinskoye Rural Settlement of Odintsovsky District, in Moscow Oblast, Russia.

== Population ==
In 2010, the population was 190 inhabitants.

== Transport ==
The village is served by a railway station, the terminal of the line that links the locality to central Moscow.

== Government buildings ==
The presidential estate of Novo-Ogaryovo, one of the homes of President Vladimir Putin, is located in the locality.

Usovo is nicknamed "the tsar village" because the family of Vladimir Putin owns several houses in the locality, including his two daughters Maria and Katerina and his ex-wife, Liudmila.

The locality is located within the so-called Rublevka district, the wealthiest neighbourhood in Moscow and home to many oligarchs and businessmen.
