= Dacha =

Seasonal or year-round second home in Russian-speaking and post-Soviet countries

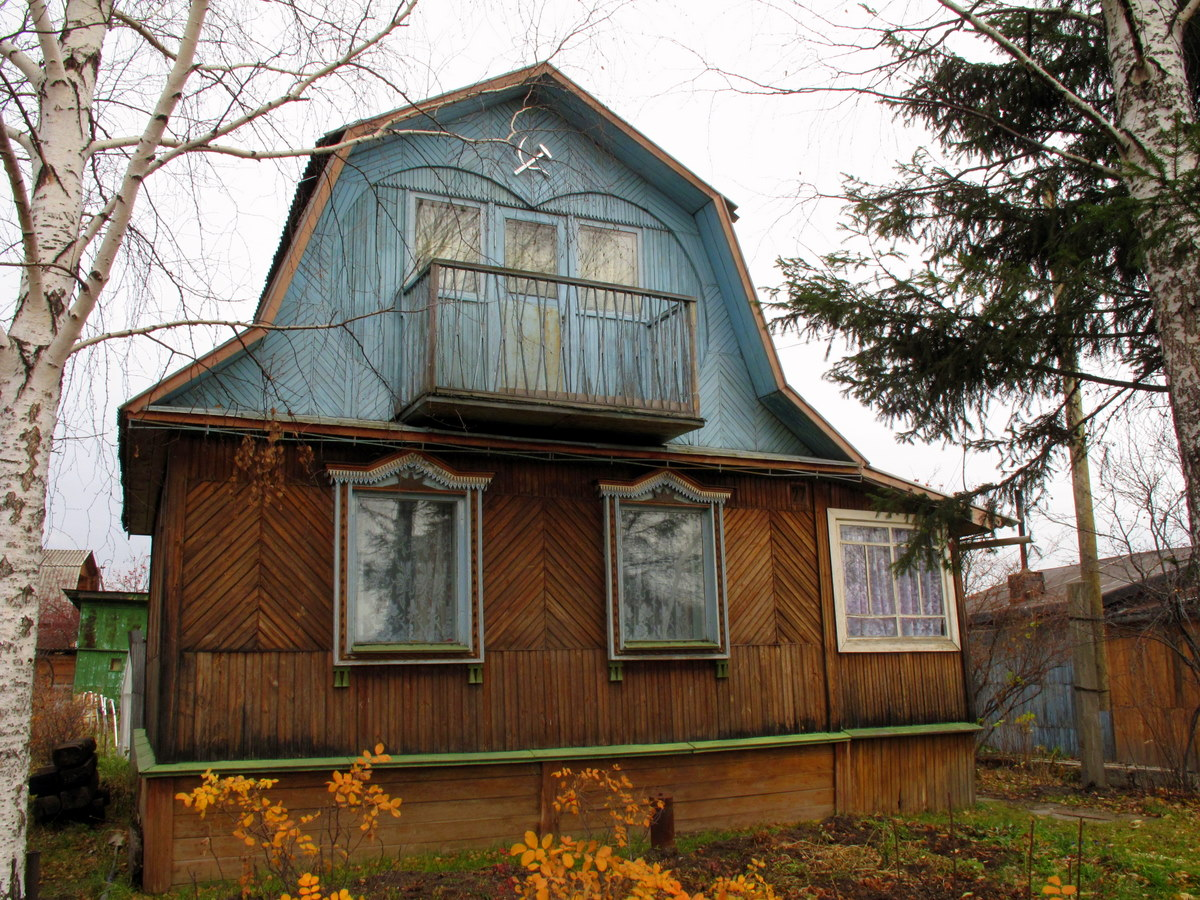
Soviet-era dacha with hammer and sickle in Yekaterinburg

A dacha (Russian: дача, IPA: [ˈdatɕə]) is a seasonal or year-round second home, often located in the exurbs of post-Soviet countries, including Russia. A cottage (коттедж, kottedzh) or shack serving as a family's main or only home, or an outbuilding, is not considered a dacha, although some dachas recently have been converted to year-round residences and vice versa.

The noun "dacha", coming from verb "davat" (to give), originally referred to land allotted by the tsar to his nobles; and indeed the dacha in Soviet times is similar to the allotment in some Western countries – a piece of land allotted, normally free, to citizens by the local government for gardening or growing vegetables for personal consumption. With time the name for the land was applied to the building on it. In some cases, owners occupy their dachas for part of the year and rent them to urban residents as summer retreats. People living in dachas are colloquially called dachniki (дачники); the term usually refers not only to dacha dwellers but to a distinctive lifestyle. The Russian term is often said to have no exact counterpart in English.

Dachas are common in Russia, and are also widespread in most parts of the former Soviet Union and in some countries of the former Eastern Bloc. Surveys in 1993–1994 suggest about 25% of Russian families living in large cities had dachas. Most dachas are in colonies of dachas and garden plots near large cities. These clusters have existed since the Soviet era, and consist of numerous small land plots. They were initially intended only as recreation getaways of city dwellers and for growing small gardens for food.

Dachas originated as small country estates given as a gift by the tsar, and have been popular among the Russian upper- and middle-classes ever since. During the Soviet era, many dachas were state-owned, and were given to the people. The government of the Russian Federation continues to own State dachas (gosdacha) used by the president and other officials. They were extremely popular in the Soviet Union.

As regulations severely restricted the size and type of dacha buildings for ordinary people during the Soviet period, permitted features such as large attics or glazed verandas became extremely widespread and often oversized. In the period from the 1960s to 1985, legal limitations were especially strict: only single-story summer houses without permanent heating and with living areas less than 25 m^{2} (269 sq ft) were allowed as second housing (though older dachas that did not meet these requirements continued to exist). In the 1980s, planners loosened the rules, and since 1990 all such limitations have been eliminated. As of 2019, about 62% of Russians visit dachas in the summer.

== History ==
=== Origins ===
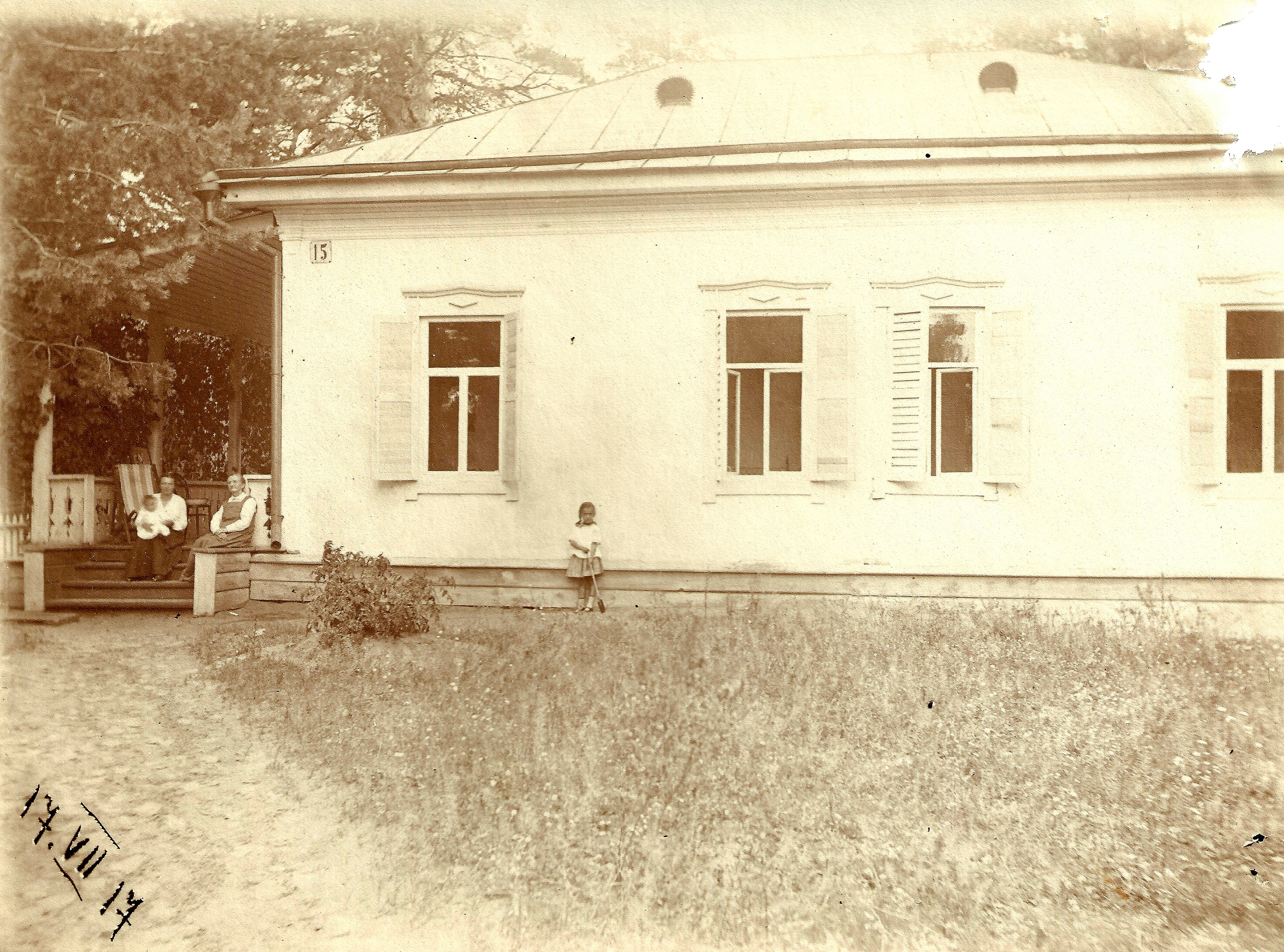
A dacha near Moscow, 1917

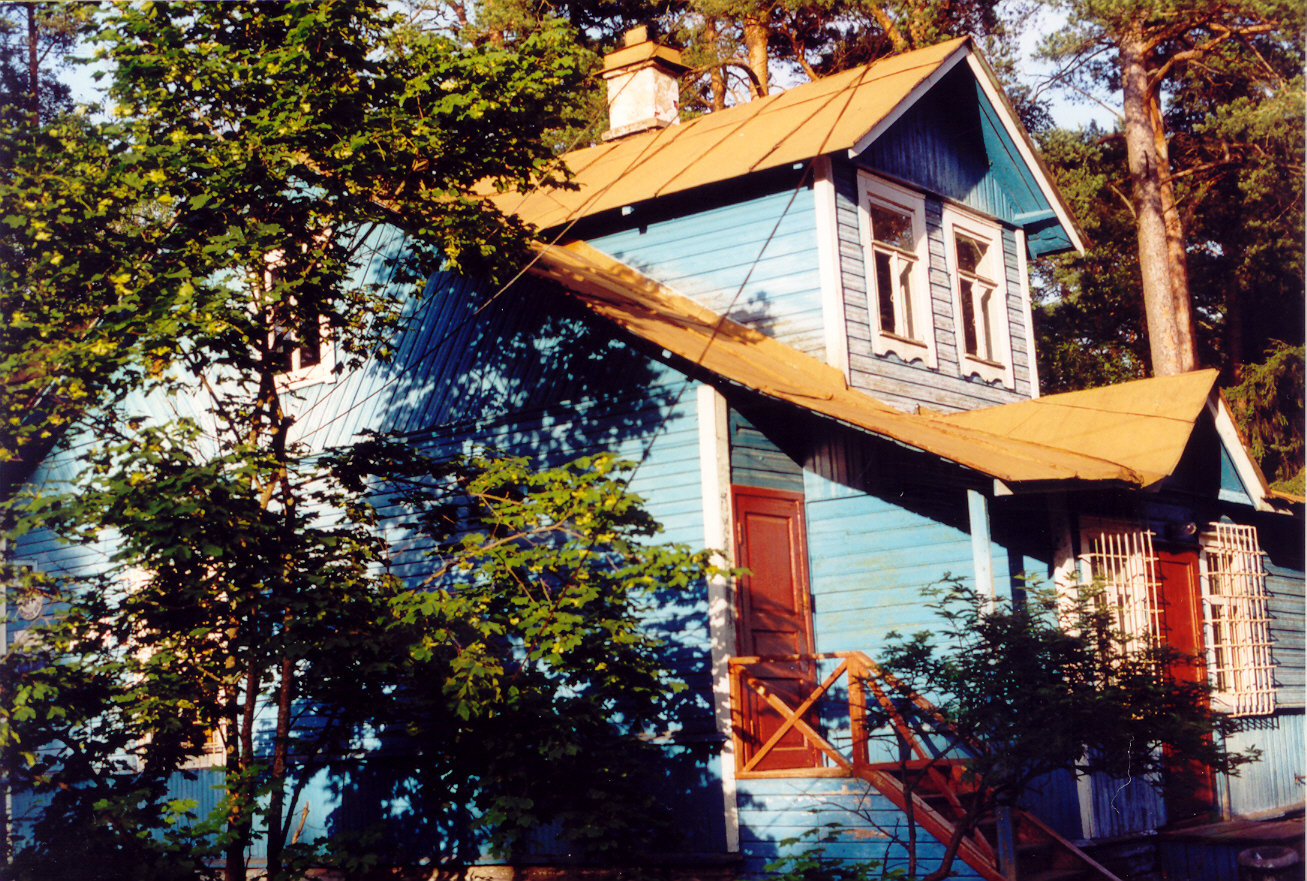
An old dacha near Saint Petersburg

The first dachas in Russia began to appear during the 17th century, initially referring to small estates in the country that were given to loyal vassals by the tsar. In archaic Russian, the word dacha means something given, from the verb "дать" [dat'] – "to give". During the Age of Enlightenment, Russian aristocracy used their dachas for social and cultural gatherings, which were usually accompanied by masquerade balls and firework displays. The coming of the Industrial Revolution to Russia brought about a rapid growth in the urban population, and wealthy urban residents increasingly desired to escape the heavily polluted cities, at least temporarily.

By the end of the 19th century, the dacha became a favorite summer retreat for the upper and middle classes of Russian society. In the tsarist era, dachas tended to have pleasure gardens, but were not used much for growing food. Maxim Gorky wrote a novelette entitled Dachniki (1885), about newlywed city-dwellers living a 'simple' summer life of walks in the countryside.

=== Soviet Union ===
Following the Russian Revolution, most dachas were nationalised. Some were converted into vacation homes for factory workers, while others, usually of better quality, were distributed among the prominent functionaries of the Communist Party and the newly emerged cultural and scientific elite. All but a few dachas remained the property of the state and the right to use them was usually revoked when a dacha occupant was dismissed or fell out of favour with the rulers of the state. Building new dachas required permission from senior officials and was rarely granted during the early years of the Soviet Union. The seniormost Soviet leaders all had their own dachas, and Joseph Stalin's favourite was in Gagra, Abkhazia. New dachas started to be built in larger numbers during the 1930s, and dacha colonies for artists, or soldiers, or various classes of party functionaries, started to form.

There were legal size restrictions for dacha houses in the Soviet era. They had to have not more than 25 m^{2} (269 sq ft) of living area and be only one story tall. For that reason, they usually had a mansard roof, which was considered by authorities as just a large garret or attic, not a second story. Often ill-equipped and without indoor plumbing, dachas were nevertheless a solution for millions of working-class families, to have their own form of summer retreat. Having a piece of land also offered an opportunity for city dwellers to indulge themselves in growing their own fruits and vegetables.

In the years before and after World War II, cultivation of garden crops on dacha plots was substantial, because of the failure of the centrally planned Soviet agricultural programme to supply enough fresh produce. Many dacha owners grew crops for market. Since then, growing garden crops has been of lesser importance, but continues to be widespread. Many Russian dacha owners still see gardening as a key value of dachnik culture. Keeping historical food shortages in mind, they take great pride in growing their own food rather than buying it at a store.

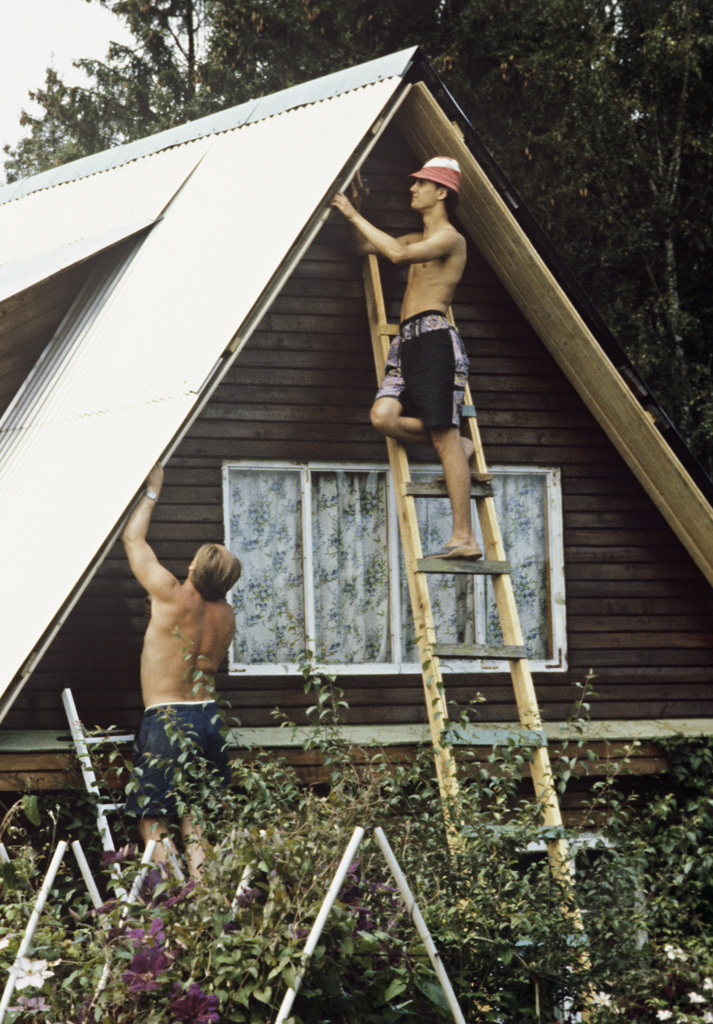
Battening a country house in a dacha co-operative in the environs of Moscow, July 1993

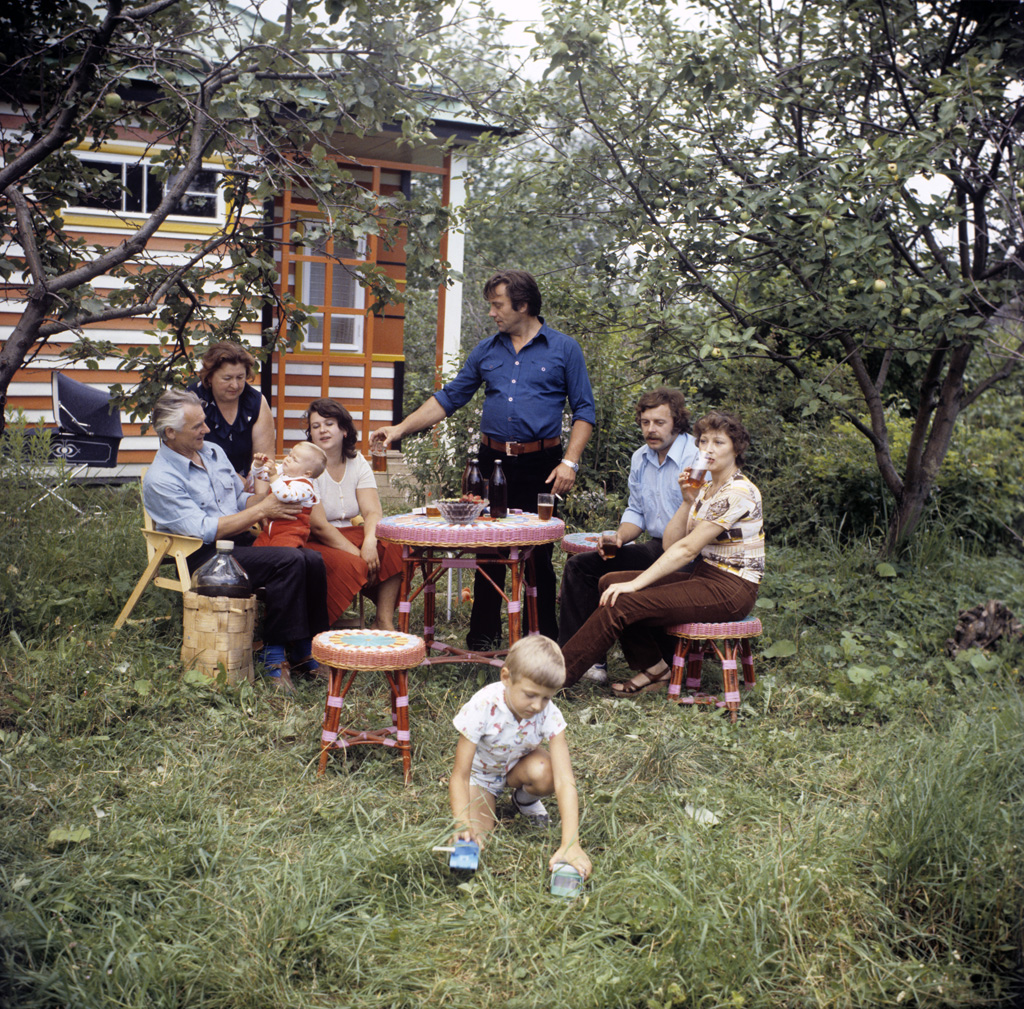
The family of a worker of the Krasny Khimik plant in Leningrad at their dacha house, July 1981

The period after World War II saw moderate growth in dacha development. Since there was no actual law banning the construction of dachas, people began occupying unused plots of land near cities and towns, growing gardens and building sheds, huts, and more prominent dwellings that served as dachas. As time passed, the number of squatters grew and the government had no choice but to officially recognise their right to amateur farming.

The 1955 legislation introduced a new type of legal person into the Soviet juridical system, a gardeners' partnership (садоводческое товарищество, sadovodcheskoye tovarishchestvo), similar to community gardens in other countries. The gardeners' partnership received the right to permanent use of land exclusively for agricultural purposes and permission to connect to public electrical and water supply networks. In 1958, yet another form of organisation was introduced, a cooperative for dacha construction (дачно-строительный кооператив, dachno-stroytelniy kooperativ), which recognised the right of an individual to build a small house on the land leased from the government.

The 1980s saw the peak of the dacha boom, with nearly all affluent families—over a third of families in urban areas—having a dacha of their own. Dacha houses built since the late 1980s are significantly larger than older ones because legal size restrictions were liberalized, and new dacha areas became fields of relatively big houses on tiny land plots. Tracts between lines of dacha land plots are usually unimproved or improved with crushed stone, and narrow (often about 6 m (20 ft) between fences) enough that two cars can hardly pass each other by.

Dachas also started to be found in other Eastern Bloc countries, especially in East Germany (where it remains quite current even after German reunification), and in Czechoslovakia and Yugoslavia.

=== Post-Soviet ===
In the 1990s, there was great unemployment in Russia and other post-Soviet states, and salaries in factories and research institutes that still functioned were sometimes not paid for many months. In these hard times potatoes grown in garden plots saved many people from hunger, and fruit and berries helped prevent vitamin deficiency.

Due to the rapid increase in urbanization in Russia, many village houses are currently being sold for use as dachas. Many Russian villages now have dachniki as temporary residents. Some villages have been fully transformed into dacha settlements, while some older dacha settlements often look like more permanent lodgings. The advantages of purchasing a dacha in a village usually are lower costs, greater land area, and larger distances between houses. The disadvantages may include lower-quality utilities, less security, and typically a farther distance to travel.

The means of transportation for people to get to their dachas, besides cars, are "water trams", buses, and electric trains (colloquially called "elektrichka"). Due to the large number of people traveling to dachas at weekends (especially during the summer), traffic typically builds up around large cities, and elektrichka and buses are filled to capacity.

Dachas have started appearing in regions of North America that have high concentrations of immigrants from Russia and Ukraine. Russians and Ukrainians from New York, Long Island, and New Jersey have been retreating to their Russian-style dacha homes in the forests of Upstate New York in order to recreate the dacha experiences they had during the Soviet era.

== Dacha gardens ==
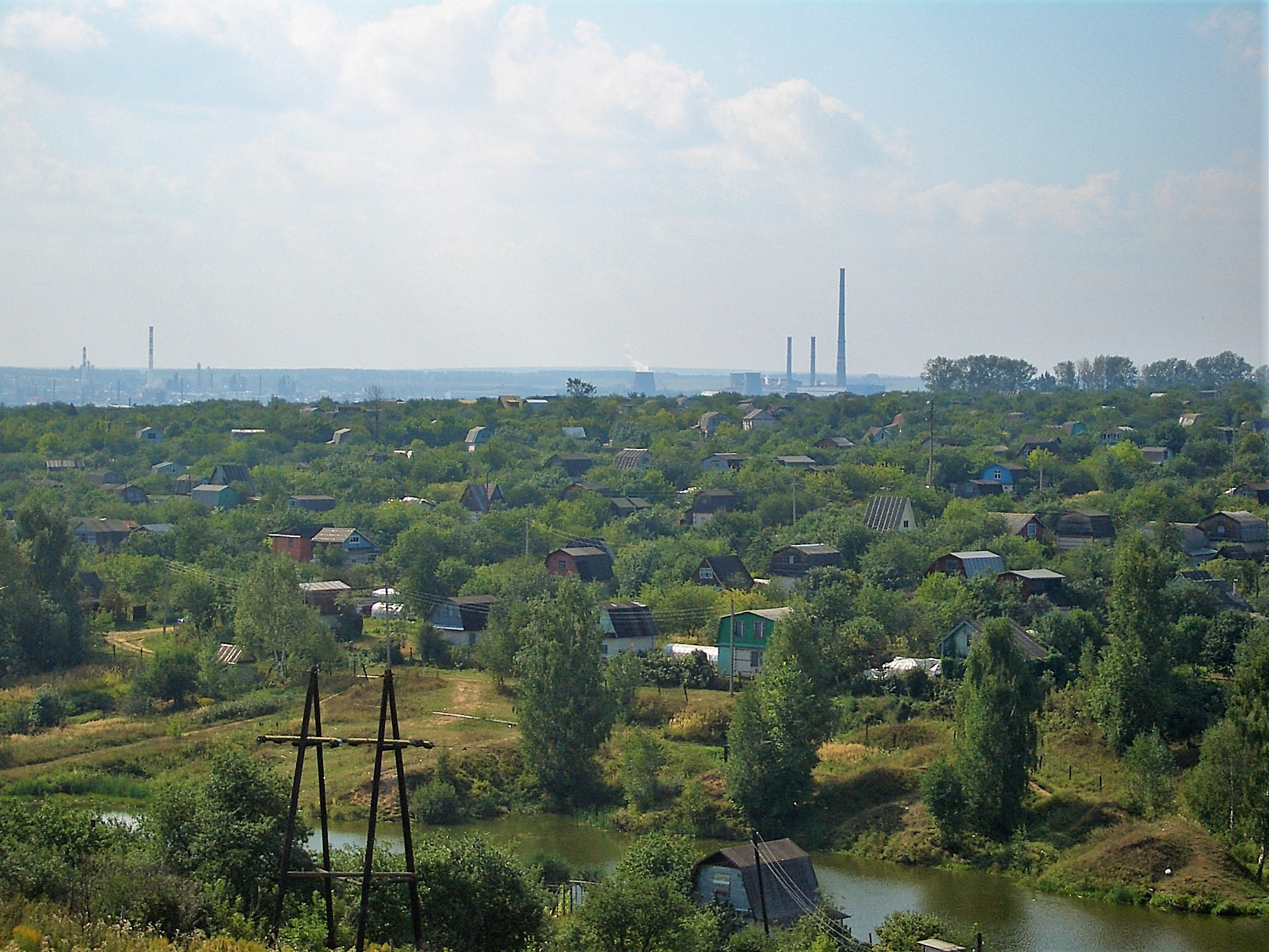
One of many dacha plots surrounding Kstovo, Nizhny Novgorod Oblast

Dacha plots are usually not more than 600 m^{2} (6,500 sq ft) in area; in some cases over 1,200 or 1,500 m^{2} (13,000 or 16,000 sq ft), but nearly never exceeding 0.96 ha (2.4 acres).They therefore are too small to grow any large amount of fruits and vegetables, thus sometimes they are also grown on separate dedicated plots of ground nearby. In Soviet times and sometimes now, such dedicated plots of ground were often made of the unused sections of agricultural fields owned by collective farms. Many small dacha plots, especially those that were recently purchased, are not used for large-scale fruit and vegetable farming. Instead, they are frequently used for gardening and planting exotic plants.

Due to custom and the perceived high costs of good equipment, even relatively large plots of land are often cultivated manually using equipment such as a spade or a spading fork. In autumn the grown potatoes and other crops are gathered and transported to the city where they are stored in cellars, dugouts (usually located on unused plots of ground), or in personal automobile garages.

Many Russians prefer to grow vegetables themselves because of the widespread belief in the excessive use of agrochemicals in the vegetables from supermarkets and grocery stores, and the higher costs of the vegetables in stores and bazaars, especially among the older part of the population. Also, growing one's own food supplies is a long-lived Russian tradition practised even by many affluent Russians. It is seen as a way to have a connection to the land, to be self-sufficient, and for many, to find some escape from a capitalist economy.

While a large portion of urban Russians grow some vegetables in their dacha gardens, the perception in some parts of society that urban Russians are becoming increasingly self-sufficient is a myth, and only some 15 percent of vegetables are grown by urban dwellers.

The most common dacha fruits in cool temperate regions of Russia are apple, blackcurrant, redcurrant, gooseberry, raspberry and strawberry (sometimes also sour cherry, downy cherry, rose hips, plum, bird cherry, pear, sea-buckthorn, Actinidia kolomikta, black chokeberry, serviceberry, barberry, sweetberry honeysuckle, blackberry and grape, but many of them are either rare or not hardy enough and require winter protection). Popular vegetables and herbs are potato, cucumber, zucchini, pumpkin, tomato, carrot, red bell peppers (capsicum), beetroot, cabbage, cauliflower, radish, turnip, onion, garlic, dill, parsley, rhubarb, sorrel, papaver, earth apple, horseradish and others.

== Elite dachas ==
=== Gosdachas ===
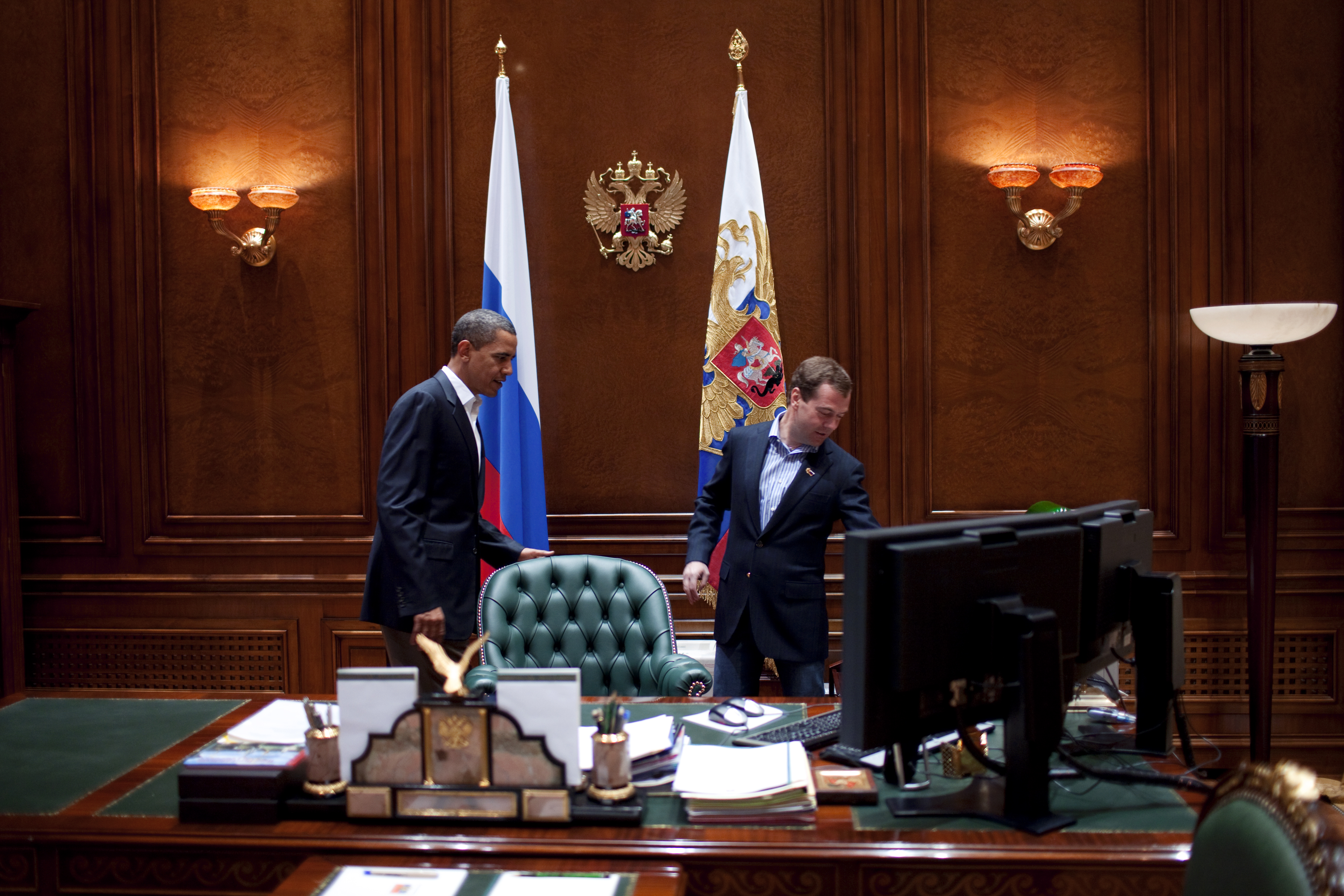
U.S. President Barack Obama and Russian President Dmitry Medvedev at Medvedev's dacha office outside Moscow, 2009

The state-owned vacation houses allotted for government officials, academicians, military personnel, and other VIPs are called "gosdachas" (госдача, short for государственная дача gosudarstvennaya dacha— "state dacha"). In modern Russia, the Federal Property Agency of Russia continues to own numerous estates throughout the country that are leased, often on non-market terms, to government officials. The President of Russia has official dacha residences in Novo-Ogaryovo and Zavidovo. Gosdachas in Komarovo and Peredelkino, Zhukovka, Barvikha, and Usovo and Rublyovka in Moscow are populated by many Soviet-era intellectuals and artists. Russian President Vladimir Putin has a dacha in the Karelian Isthmus, as part of a cooperative society called Ozero, and one in Sochi.

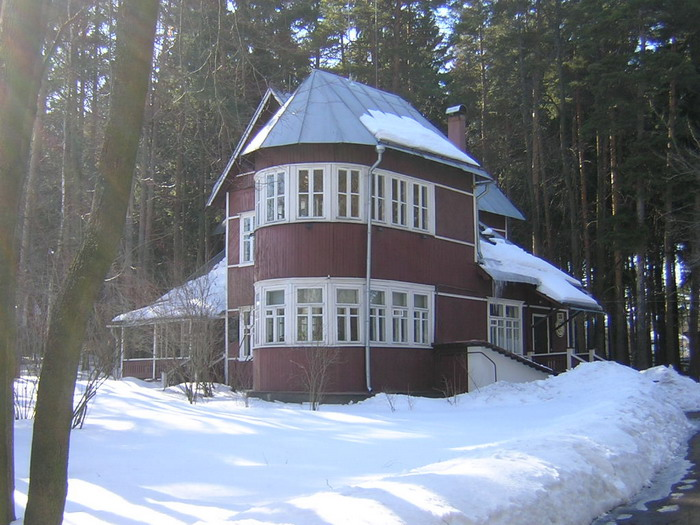
The dacha of Boris Pasternak in Peredelkino, near Moscow

=== Modern elite dachas ===
In modern times, the rise of a new class in the Russian society (the 'new Russians') has added a new dimension to the concept of dacha. (Some wealthy Russians prefer the term 'cottage' for their country homes.)

With construction costs often reaching into the millions of U.S. dollars, the dachas of the country's elite bear no resemblance to the small dachas of the Soviet era. Comparable in size and décor to mansions and palaces, they become an elaborate display of social status, wealth and power. Most dachas of the elite are constructed with brick and concrete, unlike the middle-class dachas that are mostly constructed with wood.

These new symbols of prosperity are designed by professional architects, usually in eclectic style—that older dachniks look down upon as reflecting the nouveau-riche tastes of their owners—and feature ostentatious items such as marble statues, fountains and exotic plants. Some have state-of-the-art sporting facilities such as an indoor swimming pool, multiple tennis courts and stables for race horses. A few privately owned estates even have small forests and lakes.

Wealthy Russians have also bought up many of the tsarist-era dachas of the aristocracy, and Soviet-era dachas of artists and intellectuals.

== Dachas and crimes ==
Theft is not unusual for dachas. Usually, the dachas are either without surveillance or only one single guard taking care of the entire property. In an attempt to prevent these thefts, dacha owners often take everything valuable back to their apartments in the city at the end of summer. Typically dishes, tools and clothes are stolen. Homeless people and criminals often use the dachas in autumn and winter when the owners are absent. Occasionally minors light unsupervised dachas on fire as entertainment.

Thieves also break into dachas with the intention of stealing non-ferrous metal, like gold, copper and silver. This happened to the leader of LDPR, Igor Lebedev, in 2000. Two men broke into his dacha in Odintsovo District after which they were stopped by police officers. The Moscow City Police press claims that collectors of non-ferrous metal are a big problem for the Moscow region and that they come from several different nearby regions.

Because of drug abuse becoming more prevalent, poppies are now being stolen from dachas more often. That is why growing more than two poppy plants is now considered a crime. In 2008, unknown men robbed 10 dachas, including the famous "Zelyonaya budka" (Russian: Зелёная Будка, lit. 'Green Booth') that belonged to the famous Russian poet Anna Akhmatova in the settlement Litfonda in Komarovo.

In 2000, Alexander Vasilyev committed a series of robbery-murders on dachas around Krasnoyarsk with an accomplice.

In 2002, the United States citizen Yakov Tilipman, who was representing the interests of the "Kremlyovskaya group", was shot in the protected gardening association "Yagodka" (Russian: Ягодка, lit. 'Berry') in Opalikha in the Krasnogorsk region of Moscow. In 2008, robbers in camouflage uniforms climbed over a fence and made their way into the dacha of the TV host Aleksandr Tsekalo in Krasnogorsk, where his relatives were tied up and robbed.

== See also ==
- Bach (New Zealand) – Small holiday home located near beaches
- Buitenplaats – Summer residence for Dutch townspeople
- Izba – Traditional Russian countryside dwelling
- Holiday cottage
