= Astrakhan Declaration =

2010 treaty between Armenia and Azerbaijan

The Astrakhan Declaration is a Russian-brokered humanitarian agreement between Armenia and Azerbaijan, signed on October 27, 2010, in the Russian city of Astrakhan. Concerning the post-war situation in Nagorno-Karabakh, the declaration envisages the exchange of prisoners of war and the return of the bodies of killed servicemen with the assistance of the OSCE Minsk Group co-chairmen and the International Committee of the Red Cross. The First Deputy Chairman of the State Duma International Affairs Committee Leonid Slutsky assessed the declaration as "a small advancement in geopolitical sense", which in fact has "a great political significance in the case of Nagorno-Karabakh problem".

In his statement, the then French Foreign Minister Bernard Kouchner said, that "the measures set out in the resolution adopted in Astrakhan can help to reduce tension and violations of the ceasefire, which have become frequent in past months" and "therefore, France expects them to be executed immediately". At a press briefing in Washington U.S. Assistant Secretary of State Philip J. Crowley welcomed the signing of Astrakhan Declaration as a "positive development": "We appreciate President Medvedev's personal efforts to reach this agreement, which aims to build confidence between the parties and to strengthen the 1994 ceasefire".

== See also ==
- Nagorno-Karabakh Declaration
