= Skolkovo (rural locality) =

Skolkovo (Russian: Сколково) is the name of several rural localities in Russia:

- Skolkovo, Moscow Oblast, a village in Odintsovsky District, Moscow Oblast, 55°41′15″N 37°22′10″E
- Skolkovo, Filinsky Selsoviet, Vachsky District, Nizhny Novgorod Oblast, a village in Filinsky Selsoviet of Vachsky District of Nizhny Novgorod Oblast, 55°50′14″N 42°34′27″E
- Skolkovo, Kazakovsky Selsoviet, Vachsky District, Nizhny Novgorod Oblast, a village in Kazakovsky Selsoviet of Vachsky District of Nizhny Novgorod Oblast, 55°47′44″N 42°51′58″E
- Skolkovo, Samara Oblast, a selo in Kinelsky District of Samara Oblast, 53°19′22″N 50°44′27″E
