= Research and Development Institute of Ecology and the Sustainable Use of Natural Resources =

Russian conservation technology company

Research and Development Institute of Ecology and the Sustainable Use of Natural Resources, LLC
- Trade name: Research institute of Ecology
- Native name: НИИ экологии и рационального использования природных ресурсов (NII ecologii & ratsyonal'nogo ispol'zovaniya prirodnyh resursov)
- Company type: Private
- Founded: Tyumen, Russia (April 19, 2005; 21 years ago)
- Founder: Julia Deneko
- Headquarters: Tyumen, Russia
- Number of locations: 10 affiliates (2012)
- Area served: Siberia; United States
- Key people: Victor Ryadinskiy (CEO); Julia Deneko (CMO)
- Production output: oil eating microbes
- Services: Recycling
- Website: rusecology.ru

The Research and Development Institute of Ecology and the Sustainable Use of Natural Resources, LLC (Russian: НИИ экологии и рационального использования природных ресурсов), or Research institute of Ecology, the abbreviation is the RSI — a company from Tyumen (Tyumen Oblast, Russia) specializes in development of innovation technologies in the field of environmental protection and nature conservation.

One of the first residents of the business incubator within the West Siberian innovation center. It made itself a name due to the participation in the aftereffects destruction of the Deepwater Horizon oil spill, the Gulf of Mexico (2010).

== History ==
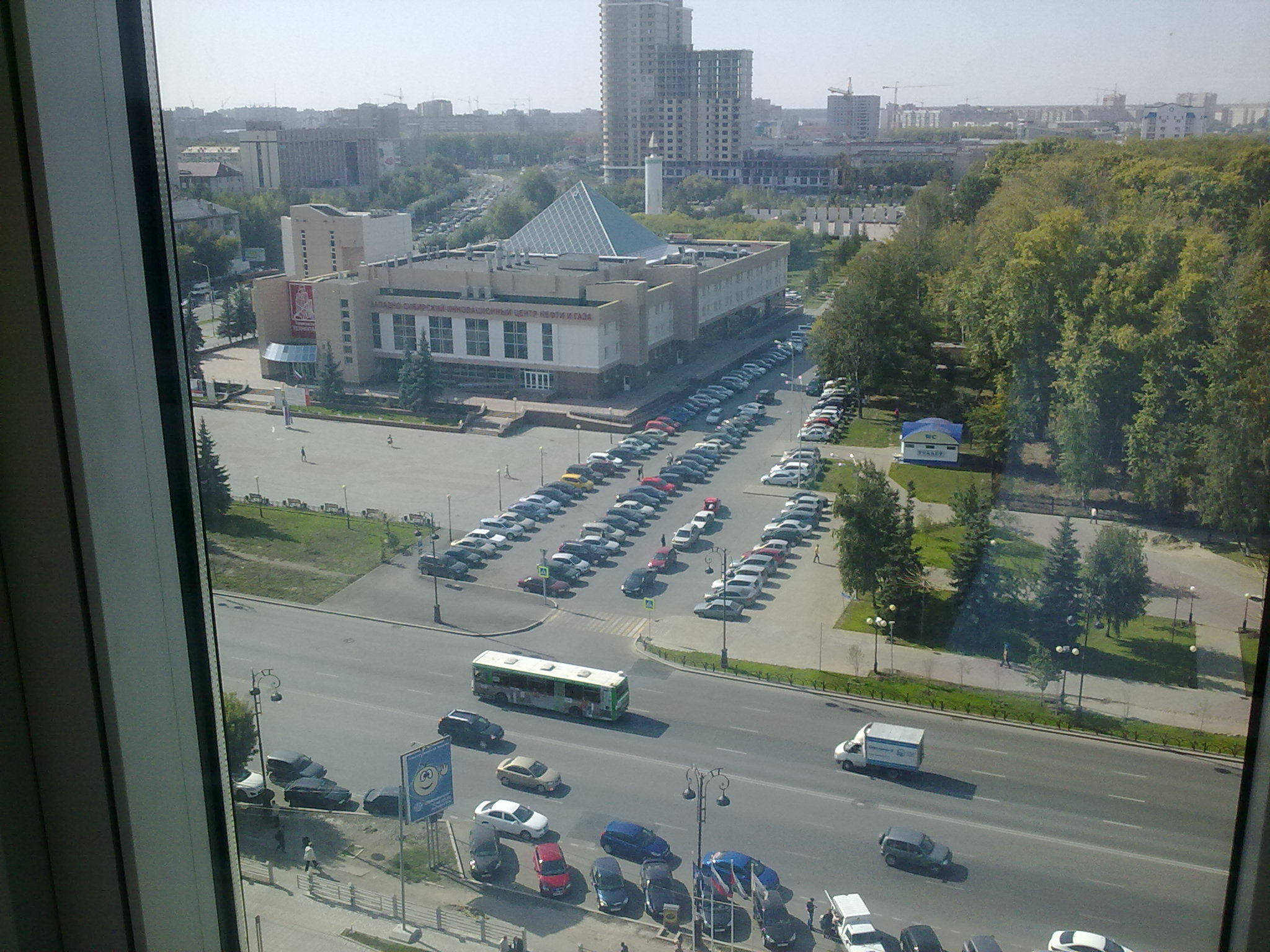
West Siberian innovation center. Tyumen, 2012

The founder of the RSI Julia Deneko (born in 1982) graduated the Faculty of Ecology and Geography of the Tyumen State University (TSU), worked as the chief specialist of the business support center of research and technology within the Science park of the TSU. Together with her father Victor Ryadinskiy, the head of the TSU's Science park was the co-author of several inventions.

The company was founded by Julia in 2005 after two years by graduation the University. In April 2009 RSI turned out to be in the first 5 companies obtained the resident status within the business incubator of the West Siberian innovation center (The Tyumen Science park), its innovation project was called «The use of the fibre "oil sorbent boom" for oil-contaminated flows clean up». In 2008, the company obtained a grant from the Governor of the Tyumen Oblast for project development.

In 2010, RSI took part in the aftereffects destruction of the Deepwater Horizon oil spill, the Gulf of Mexico (United States): it supplied materials and waged a field supervision. In December, 2012 the company has applied for inclusion into the science park «WISTA» (Berlin, Germany) residents.

== Structure ==
The information about the head of the company is contradictory. According to one data, the CEO of the company is Julia Deneko, according to the other one – her father and co-author of the inventions Victor Ryadinskiy. Sometimes Julia Deneko is called as a chief marketing officer.

The company has 10 affiliates in the Khanty-Mansi Autonomous Okrug and the Yamalo-Nenets Autonomous Okrug. The main landfills of RSI are near Tyumen, in the area of Verkhniy Bor. In the Khanty-Mansi Autonomous Okrug the landfill mobile plant Dekontamobil (Russian: Деконтамобил) is used; the plant was awarded by the «National environment award» in 2009.

== Activity ==
=== Technology ===
RSI owns 6 patented technologies and 14 certified materials. On the forum «The new technologies of the oil waste processing and the contaminated land revegetation» held in Moscow, in 2012, the participants displayed a high interest to the oil sorbent boom, the local above gas flare device for use of associated petroleum gas; and the landfill mobile plant Dekontamobil.

==== The fiber oil sorbent boom ====
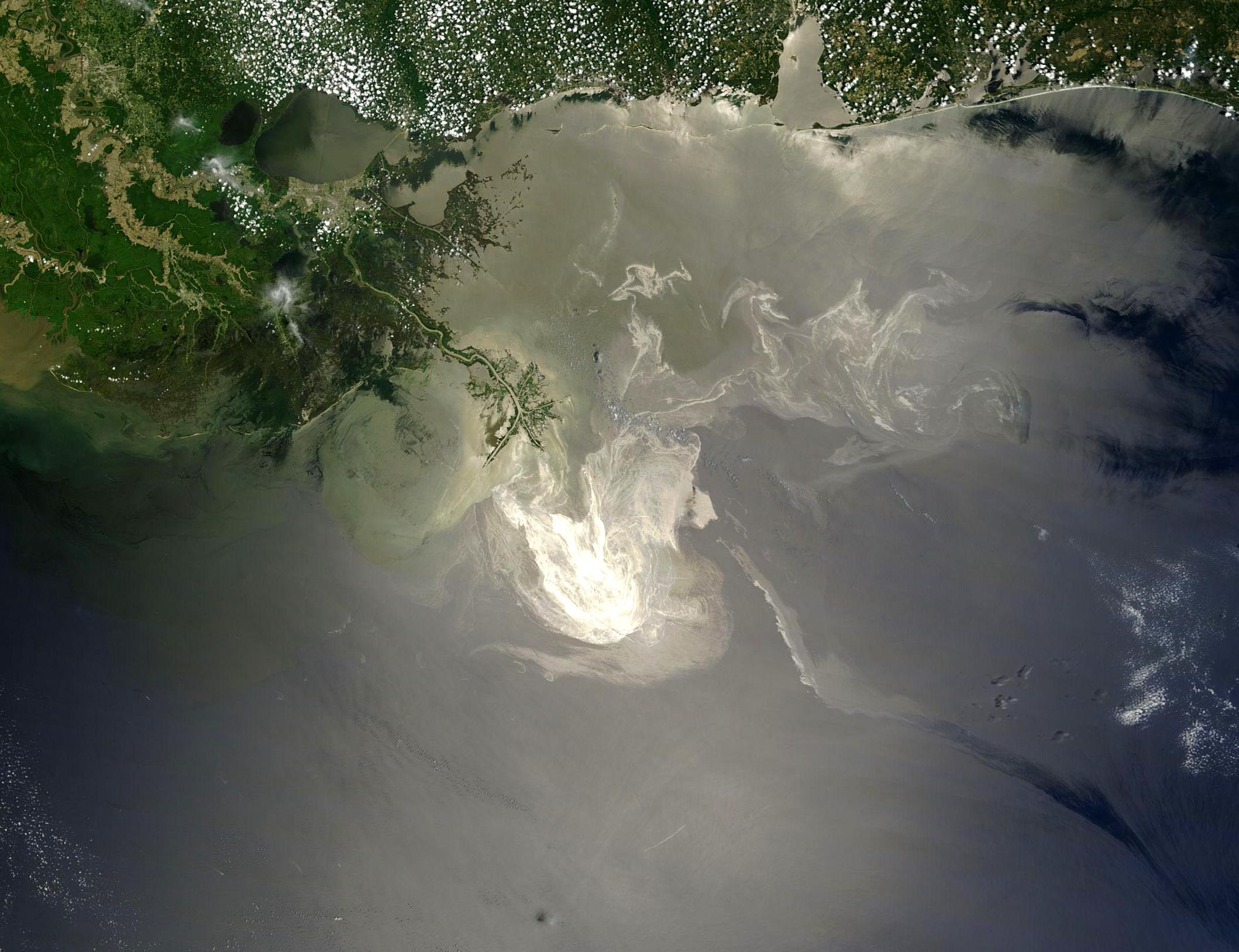
The oil spill in the Gulf of Mexico, sight from Space. May 24, 2010

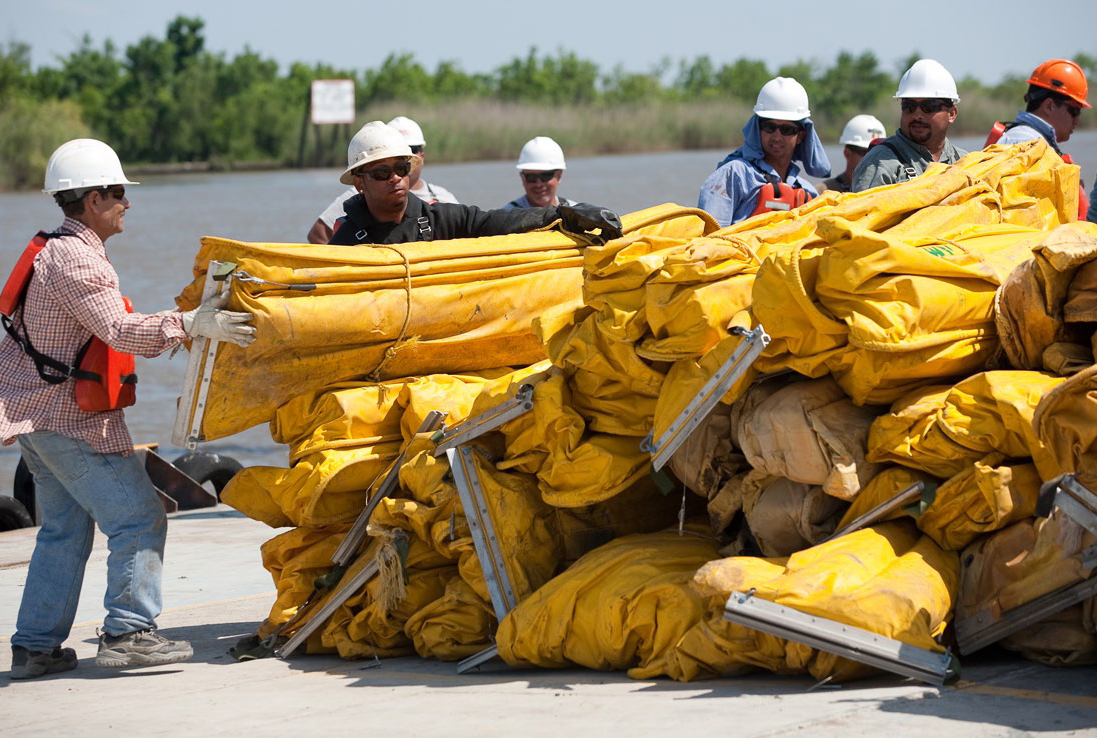
The workers are preparing the boom defence. Gulf of Mexico. April 30, 2010

The most known technology of the company is the fiber oil sorbent boom. The ideologist of the invention is Petr Gvozdyak – the doctor of Biological Sciences, the professor of the Colloid chemistry and the Water chemistry Institute of the National Academy of Sciences of Ukraine (Kyiv), who invented the method of sewage treatment by bioremediation (SU 1428713 A1 patent). The staff of the laboratory of the Research Institute of Ecology and Natural Resources Management of the TSU patented the consortium of oil eating microbes Arthrobacter Oxydans-091 and Pseudomonas putida, but the RU 2275466 C1 patent put out of action in 2007. Therefore, the authors Victor Ryadinskiy and Julia Deneko applied for the new patent (RU 2431017 C1 patent) in 2010.

The essence of the technology is that the special fibers saturated with oil eating microbes are fastened on the floating booms. The fibers hook up the oil patches on themselves and microbes biodegrade it during several days, oil is decomposed into carbonic acid and water. The fiber attachments do not hinder the water flow. Also it has the largest absorbing surface area: 5-10 thous. m^{2} per 1 cubic metre of the construction. The tests on the river Var-Egan show the reduction of the petroleum product concentration of water column in 4 times, the surface pellicular oil reduced in 43 times.

The project became the finalist of the «Russian innovations competition–2009» and the «Zworykin Award-2011». The technology was applied in the time of the aftereffects Deepwater Horizon oil spill, the Gulf of Mexico, 2010. RSI worked under the contract with the American company TransGlobal Remediation Group. The American bacteria raised by the researchers from Texas (Texas A&M University System, United States) were used because of the long awaiting of the microbes import permission from the United States Environmental Protection Agency.

==== The pyrolysis plant by TransGlobal Remediation Group ====
In the result of the partnership with TransGlobal Remediation Group in the time of the aftermath's destruction of the Gulf of Mexico accident, RSI got the exclusive right to distribute the American pyrolysis plants into Russia. The plants allow the processing of any organic compound at a rate of from 115 kg to 8 tons per hour with the performance 99%. On the downstream the synthetic fuel, biogas, biofuel and electric energy are generated.

==== The local above gas flare device ====
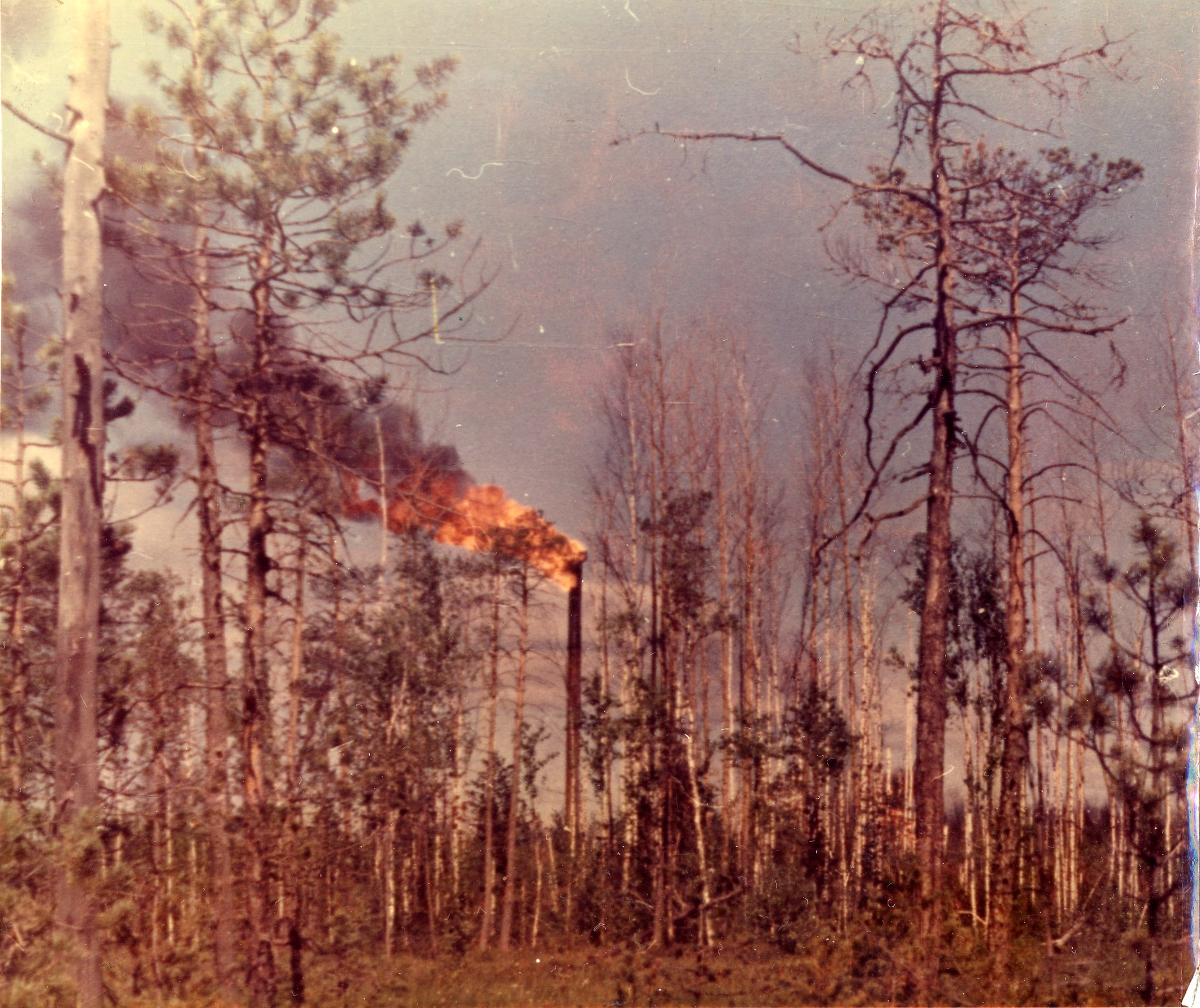
Gas flare in taiga. Western Siberia, the beginning of the 1980s

The device allows the increasing of the combustion temperature of the associated petroleum gas; as a result, the majority of pollutants will burn down inside gas flare. It causes the reduction of pollutant emissions into the atmosphere (according to the developer – in 20-40 times). The obtained heat can be used in greenhouses.

The company obtained a grant from the Governor of the Tyumen Oblast for the realization of its technology. In October, 2011, the head of RSI was proposed by the head of the community «Futurerussia Skolkovo» Ivan Burtnik to apply for the including in the list of residents of the Skolkovo Innovation Center (Skolkovo, Moscow Oblast, Russia). The first successful tests of the plant were held in March, 2012. The technology is planned for its needs by the company ILF Consulting Engineers (Munich, Germany).

==== Decontamix ====
The name originates from the words «decontamination» (purification) and «mix» (mixing). This material is the type of so-called «burolit» mixture – the product of the drilled cuttings processing, it is used for the highways building. Victor Ryadinskiy built the so-called earth house of the decontamix on his own land lot, in the village of Reshetnikova, near Tyumen. He called it «burlyanka». A house from such material can be built in 2–5 days, its thermal insulation is provided by the soil layer 1,5 m thick and by grass and snow. The project of burlyanka was awarded by the golden medal in the nomination «The best exposition» on the exhibition «The landscape design and architecture held» in Tyumen, on May 15–19, 2013.

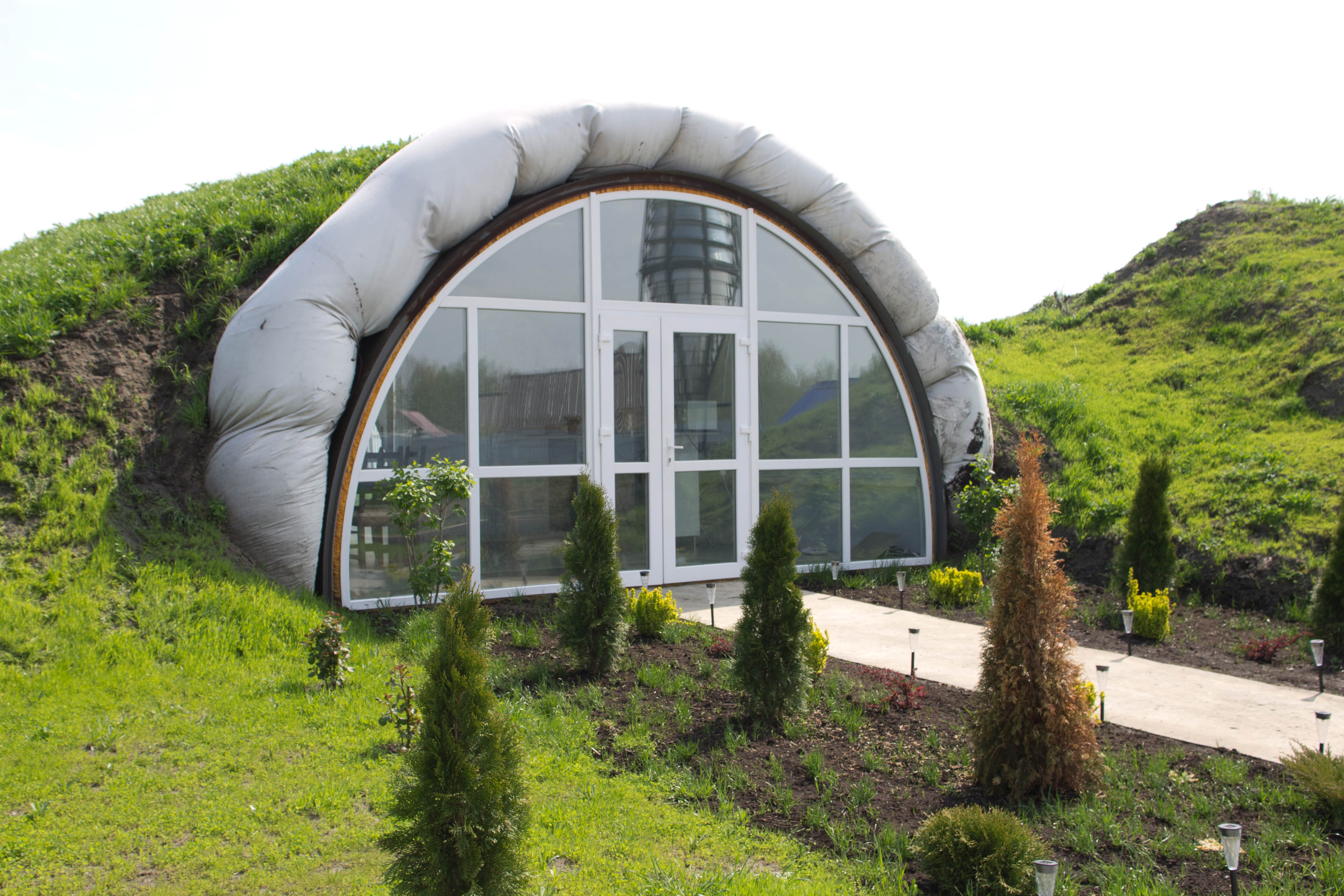

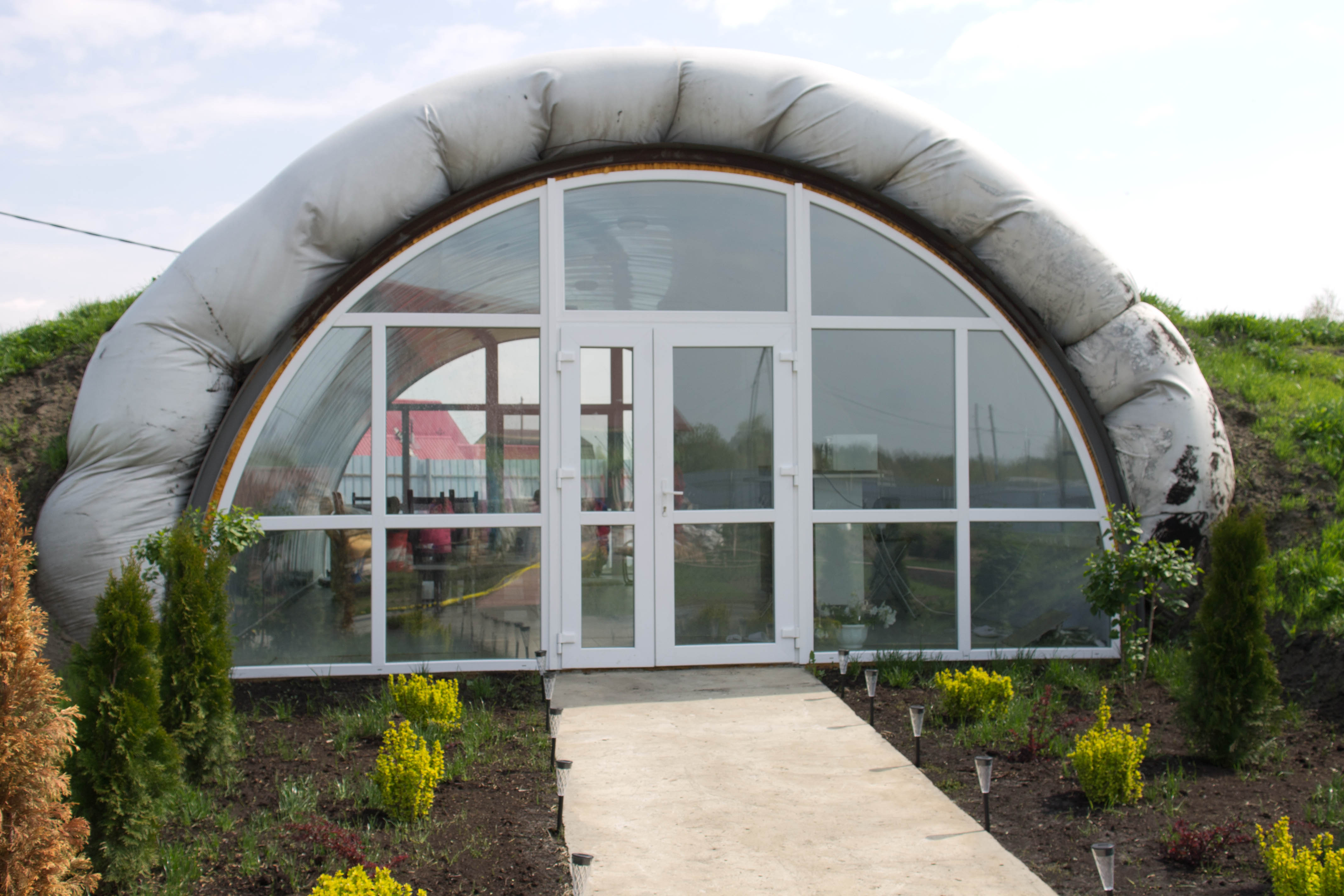

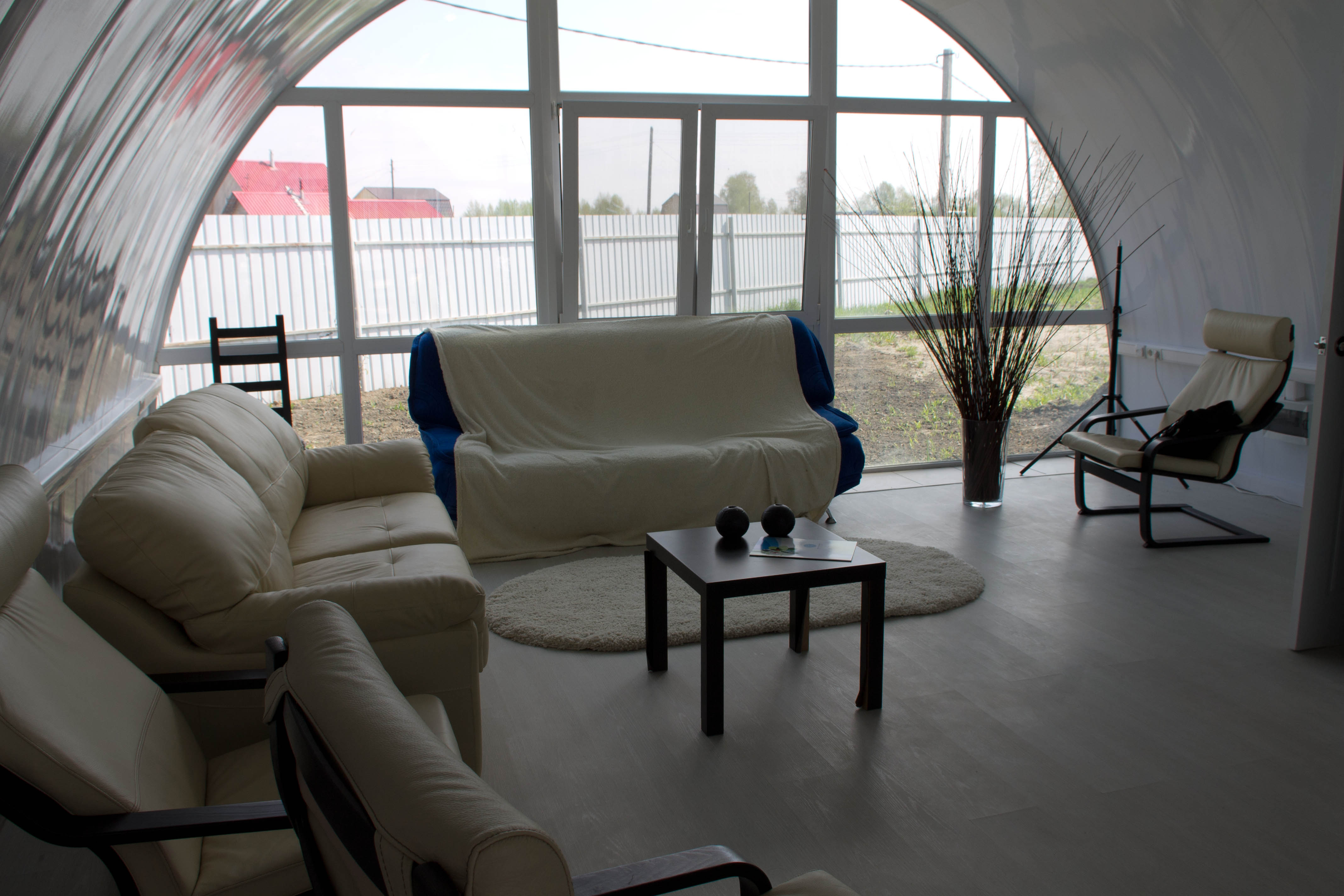

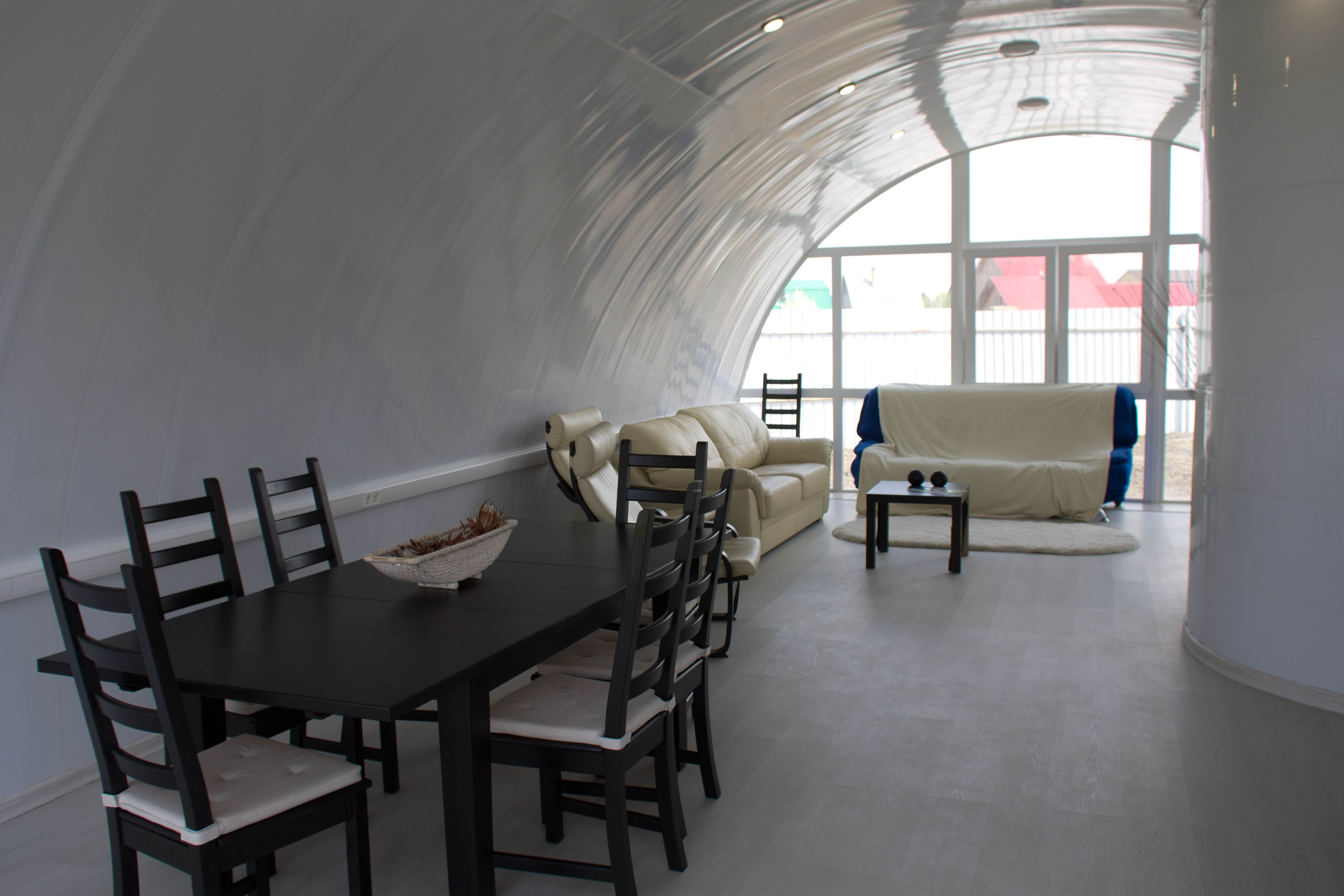

==== The pump for viscous liquid fluid ====
It is the codevelopment with the American researchers, it was presented for the first time within the exhibition «NeftGasTEK-2011» in Tyumen. It is able to pump 115 cubic meters of viscous liquid fluid per hour from the depth up to 30 meters.

==== 3D-Vision Space ====
It exists only in the design phase. The idea is based on the technology of pattern recognition, owned by the Russian company «Papillon Systems» (Miass, Chelyabinsk Oblast), the resident of the business incubator Plug and Play Tech Center (Sunnyvale, California). RSI proposed to use this technology for the recognition of the both pollutant free and contaminated territories. From the American side, the formalization of the information on the environmental technologies is represented by the KMT International, Inc (Fremont, California).

=== Capacities ===
RSI has implemented several hundred projects for leading oil companies in northern Russia. The company processed circa 1 million cubic meters of the drilling wastes, held the revegetation of circa 1,000 hectares of disturbed and contaminated lands. 80% of offers are obtained from the Tyumen Oblast (including autonomous okrugs).

== Community involvement ==
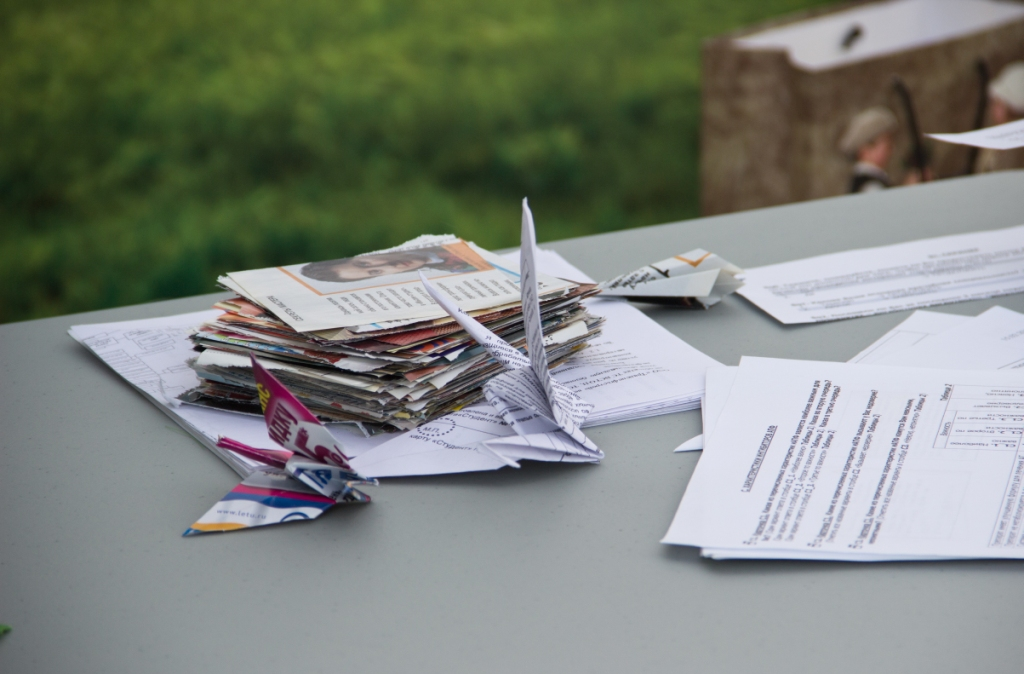
The craftwork from old journals made within the environmental art-mob. Tyumen. June 5, 2013

In 2012, the company was a partner of the III International Innovation Forum «NeftGazTEK» in Tyumen. In December of that year, Julia Deneko became chairman of the Public Council under the Rosprirodnadzor in the Tyumen Oblast. In June 2013 the World Environment Day RSI co-organized the environmental art-mob in Tyumen, in the course of which children were held workshops on plastic paper, modeling figures of birds and animals out of paper, create ekobags without thread and needles, re-use of old magazines to make decorations of beads.

== Awards and achievements ==
=== Corporate ===
- Winner of the Russian competition «National environment award» (2009) in the nomination «Innovative eco-efficient technologies in industry» for the project «The drilling waste processing of the oil and gas producers by means of the mobile landfill plant "Decontamobil"»;
- The prize «European Standard 2011» awarded by the International association «Eurostandard» (City of Brussels, Belgium);
- In 2011 became the laureate of the Russian national programme-competition «100 best goods of Russia»;
- Winner of the competition «The best company of the Tyumen Oblast—2011» in the nomination «The best innovation company» among the medium business enterprises.

=== Personal ===
Julia Deneko:

- in 2010 became the winner of the Tyumen regional prize of public recognition «Fortuna» in the nomination «Discovery of the year»;
- in 2011 won in the nomination «Innovative business» of the regional, district (within the Ural Federal District) and Russian federal stage of the competition «Young Russian entrepreneur»;
- in 2012 became the winner of the Tyumen regional prize of public recognition «Club 7» (the club of mass media editors-in-chief) in the nomination «Businessman of the year».
