= Skolkovskoye Highway =

Street in Moscow, Russia

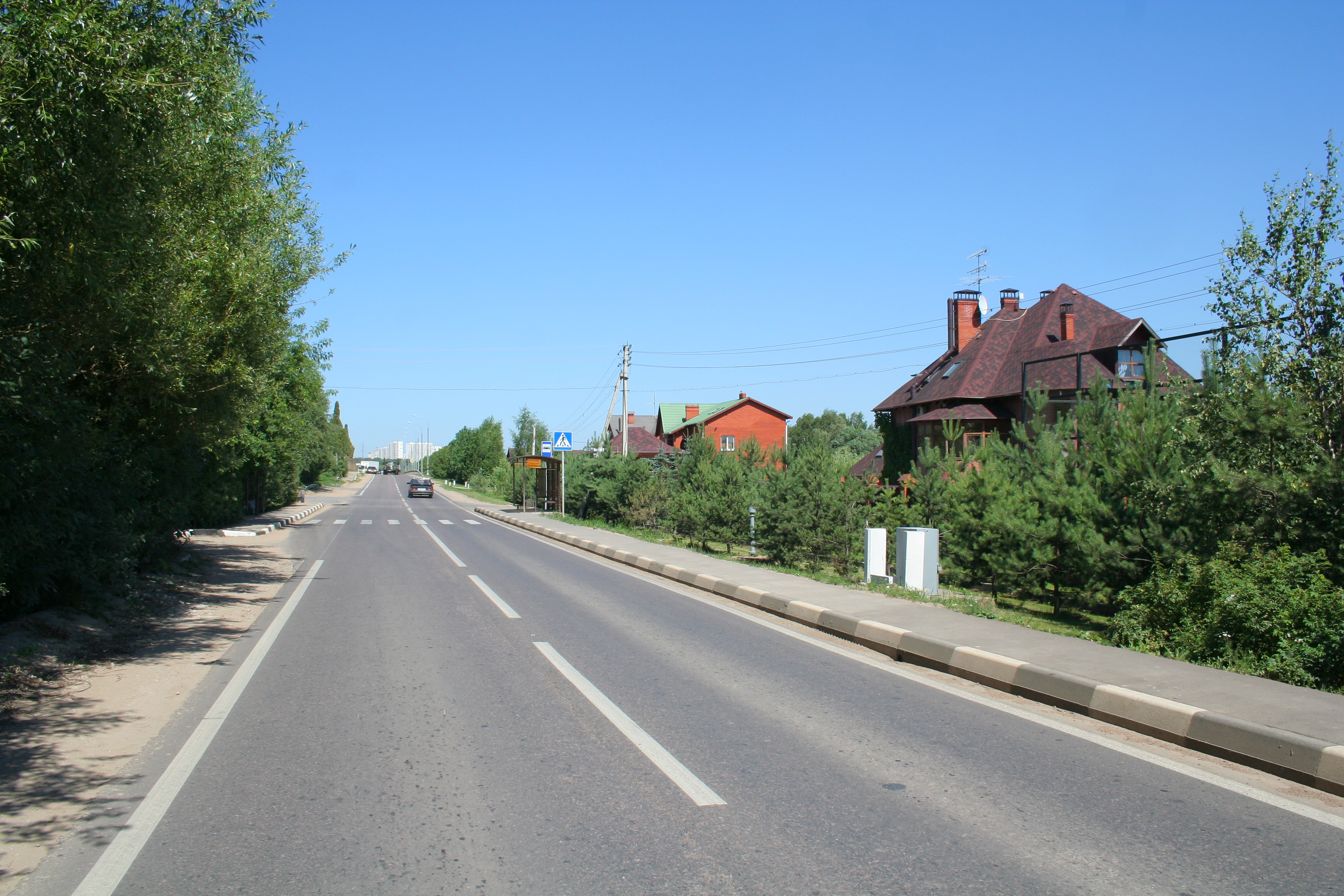
- Skolkovskoye Highway in the village of Skolkovo

Route information
- Length: 5 km (3.1 mi)

Location
- Country: Russia

Highway system
- Russian Federal Highways

The Skolkovskoye Highway (Russian: Сколковское шоссе, romanized: Skolkovskoye Shosse) is a highway located in the Mozhaysky District of the Western Administrative Okrug of Moscow and in the Odintsovsky District of Moscow Oblast. In 2012, the highway overtook the famous Rublyovka in terms of the cost of renting a square meter of real estate.

== Etymology ==
The Skolkovskoye Highway is named after the village of Skolkovo near Moscow, to which it leads. It was already shown on plans in the 17th century. the village got its name from the surname Skolkov, known since the 16th century.
