= Novo-Ogaryovo =

Official country residence of the Russian President

Coordinates: 55°44′00.8″N 37°11′53.8″E

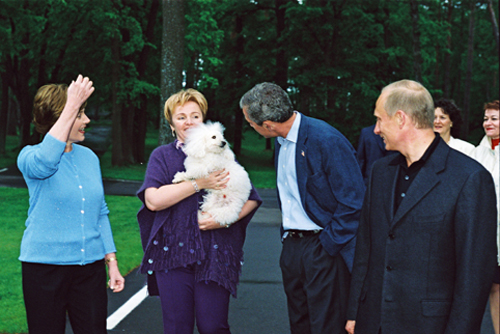
Vladimir Putin and his then-spouse Lyudmila with US president George W. Bush and his spouse Laura at Novo-Ogaryovo on 24 May 2002

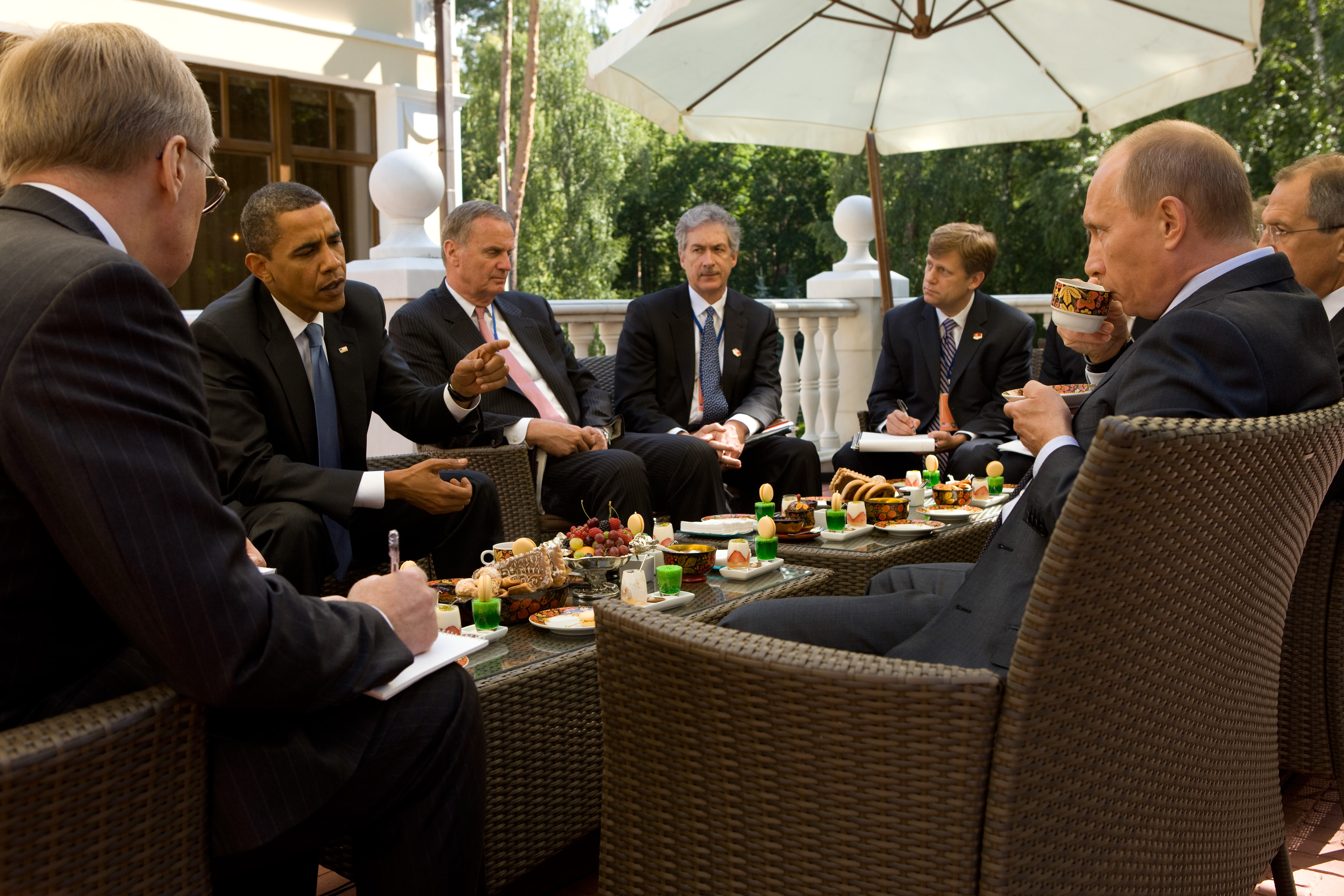
Barack Obama and Vladimir Putin at Novo-Ogaryovo on 7 July 2009

Novo-Ogaryovo (Russian: Ново-Огарёво), also transliterated as Novo-Ogarevo, is an estate in the Odintsovsky District of Moscow Oblast, located by the Rublyovo-Uspenskoye Highway west of the city of Moscow. It operates as the suburban residence of the president of Russia, officially recognized as such in 2000, although, throughout President Vladimir Putin's second tenure, he has spent progressively more time at Novo-Ogaryovo, so much so that it has been unofficially termed the de facto residence of the head of state.

== History ==
Novo-Ogaryovo was constructed in the first half of the 1950s on the foundation of a 19th-century villa, at the behest of Georgy Malenkov, using his architect daughter's design. Construction work was under way when Malenkov was removed from his position of Premier of the Soviet Union in 1955, and the place was then used as a gosdacha, a "state dacha", or vacation retreat for housing guests, for receptions, and as a workplace for various government committees.

Since 1991, Novo-Ogaryovo has been reserved as a government residence, mostly unused until Russian president Vladimir Putin (in office from 31 December 1999) had it renovated in 2000. A six-meter-high wall surrounds the Presidential residence.

In October 2012, Putin announced his intention to work at Novo-Ogaryovo to avoid commuting into Moscow, due to the city's extensive traffic congestion.

In April 2020, Putin self-isolated at Novo-Ogaryovo after meeting with the head doctor of City Clinical Hospital No. 40, Moscow, who later tested positive for COVID-19.

== Gallery ==
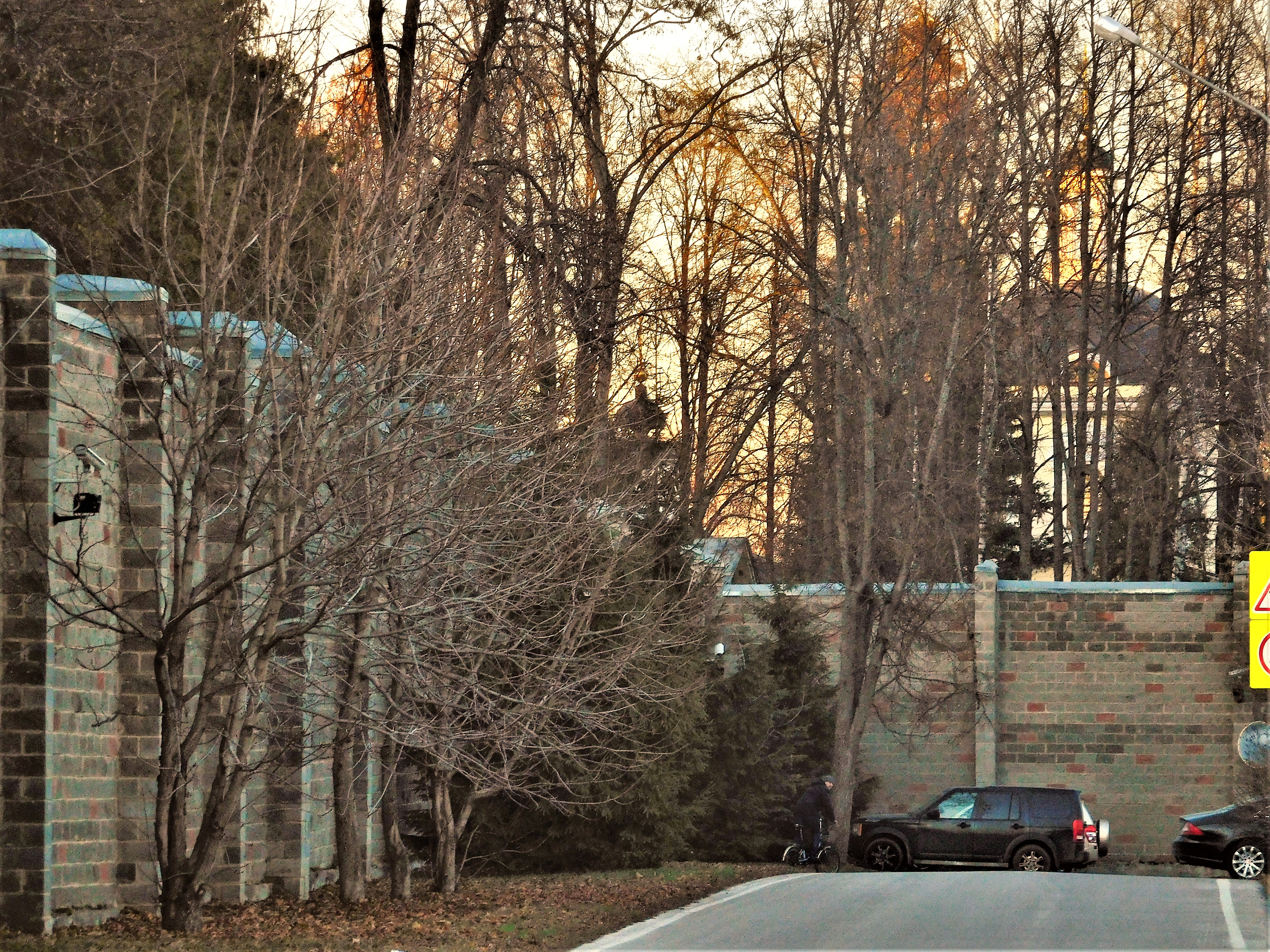
Residence

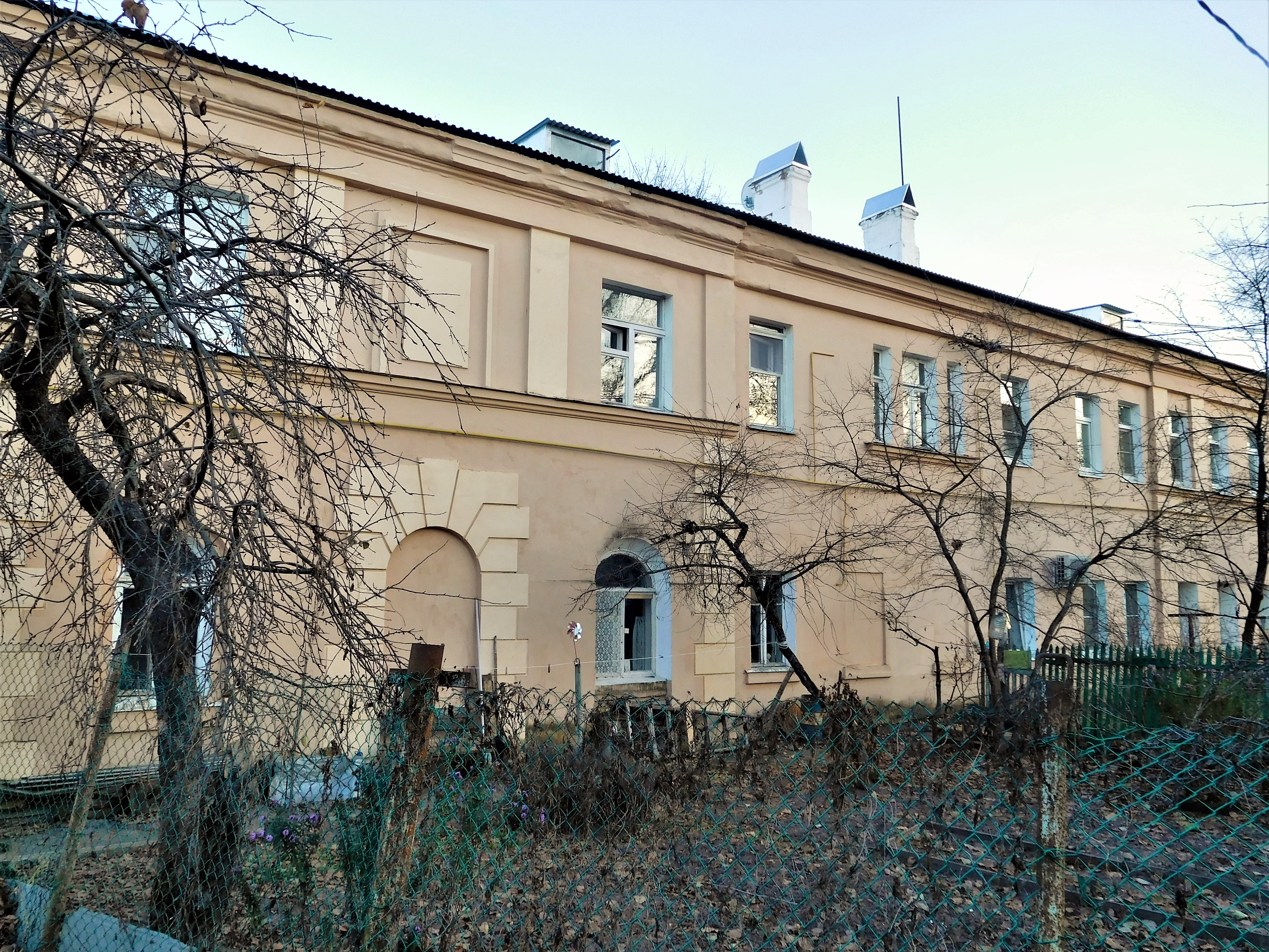
Residence

== See also ==
- Meyendorff Castle
- Zavidovo
- Foros, Crimea
- Livadia Palace
- Massandra Palace
- Bocharov Ruchey
- Strelna
- Putin's Palace
- Camp David
- Chequers
