= Barvikha =

Barvikha Барви́ха
- Village
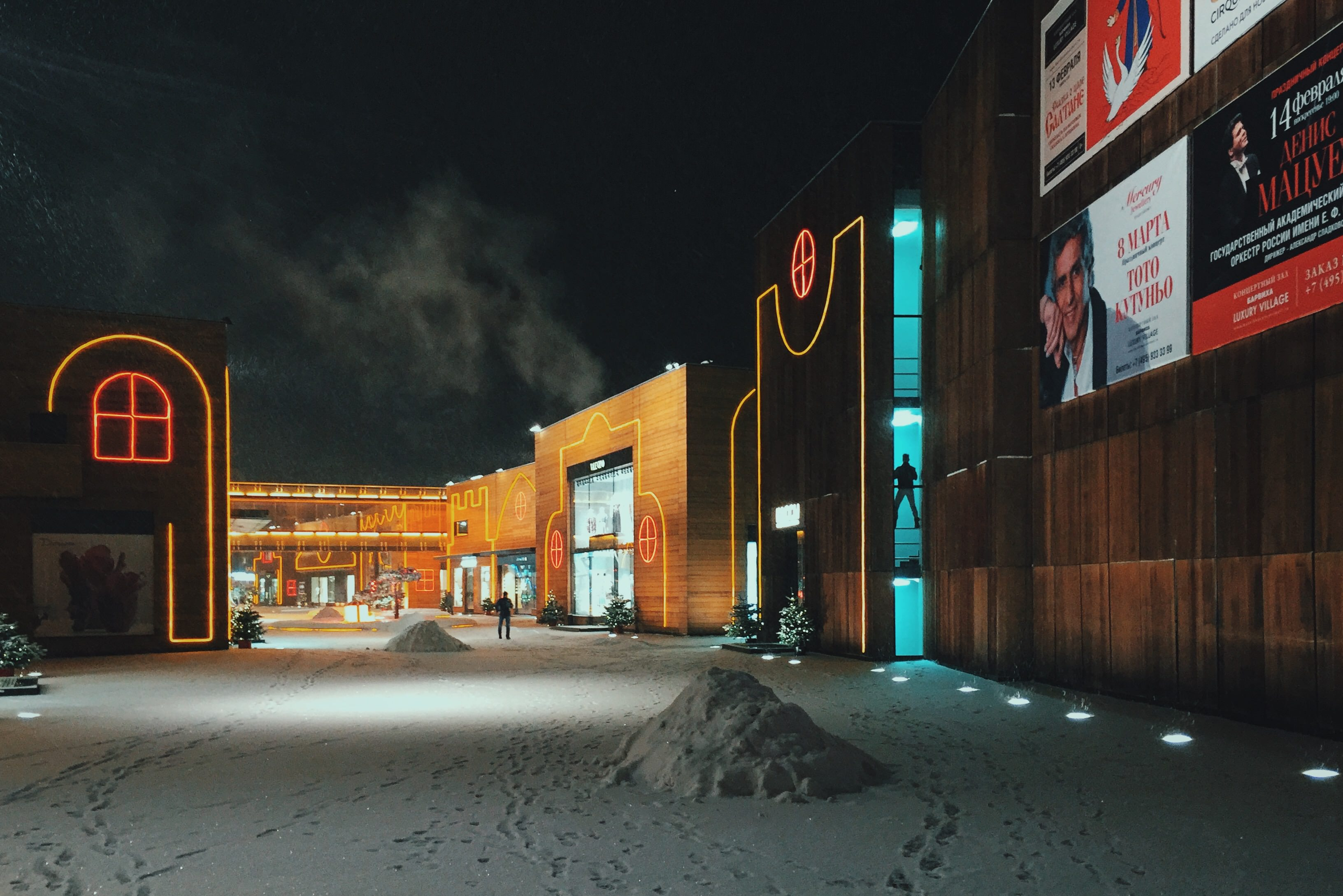
- "Barvikha Luxury Village", a luxury shopping, hotel and spa complex located in the village.
- Interactive map of Barvikha
- Location within Moscow Oblast Location within Russia
- Coordinates: 55°44′28″N 37°16′34″E
- Country: Russia
- Region: Moscow Oblast
- District: Odintsovsky District
- Time zone: UTC+3:00

Barvikha (Russian: Барви́ха) is a village in Odintsovsky District of Moscow Oblast, Russia. It is the site of the Barvikha Sanatorium, the health resort of the President of Russia. During the Soviet era, Barvikha was known as the site of the most desirable state dachas for government officials and leading intellectuals. Since the late 1990s many of Russia's wealthiest individuals have built private luxury dachas in Barvikha. The village lies in an area nicknamed "Rublyovka", known as the most expensive area in Russia.

== Geography ==
The village lies on the Rublyovo-Uspenskoye road leading to the west from Moscow, just outside the Moscow Ring Road and the boundaries of the city of Moscow. There is a Barvikha rail station on a spur of the Belarus direction of the Moscow Railway, first opened at the current site in 1927.

Barvikha is surrounded by a zone of pine forest nature preserve on the south bank of the Moscow River.

== History ==
Two villages, Lutskaya (Луцкая) and Shulgina (Шульгина) existed in the area where modern Barvikha now stands. Later they grew and merged into a settlement, which was originally called Samynki (Самынки), after the Saminka River, on which the settlement stood. Over time, the name changed to Borikha (Бориха) and later—to Barvikha. By 1890, the population of the village consisted of almost 100 people.

== Sanatorium ==
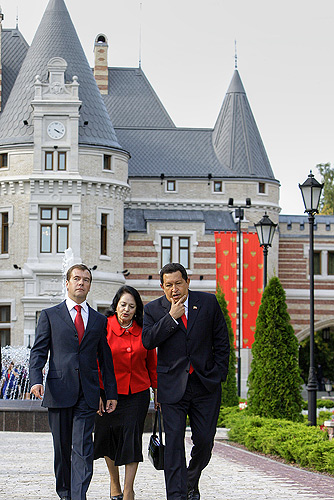
Dmitry Medvedev and Hugo Chavez at Barvikha Castle

Barvikha contains the Barvikha Sanatorium, a well-equipped medical center which treated several Russian leaders. The sanatorium was designed by architect Boris Iofan, and completed in 1935. It was designated as a clinic for leading government officials suffering from illnesses of digestion and metabolism; it was there that Bulgarian leader Georgi Dimitrov died in 1949. In 1944 and 1945, writer and Communist Party official Aleksandr Shcherbakov was treated at Barvikha for cardiac illness. He died of heart failure in 1945. In 1952, Shcherbakov's death became one of the issues in Doctors' Plot affair. The deputy director of the medical department of the sanitarium, Roman Ryzhikov, was arrested and interrogated, but later released.

In 1961 the American singer Paul Robeson was treated there for several months.

Today the sanatorium is owned by the Administration of Affairs of the President of the Russian Federation. It provides deluxe accommodations and high-quality medical services. Its grounds include a lake that offers fishing and swimming in the summer. The first President of Russia, Boris Yeltsin, made frequent stays at the sanatorium during his second presidential term and retirement. From 1996 until his death in April 2007, his primary residence was the Gorki-9 (Горки-9) presidential dacha on the Rublyovo-Uspenskoye Road, not far from Barvikha. This allowed quick access to the sanatorium's medical facilities.

== Dachas ==
The Rublyovo-Uspenskoye Road, colloquially known as the Rublyovka, has long been a site for dachas. During the Soviet period, prominent officials and intellectuals often used state-owned dachas in the vicinity of Barvikha. Writer Aleksey Tolstoy and his family occupied a state-owned dacha in Barvikha from 1938 through his death in 1945.

== Development ==
Beginning in the late 1990s, Barvikha has become a popular site for the dachas of wealthy residents of Moscow. In contrast to the traditional wood-built dachas, these new, privately owned cottages are often much larger and include mansion-like residences with full amenities and private security. The rapid development has substantially increased property values and has generated some friction with long-term local residents.

The Barvikha Luxury Village, a high-end shopping center including Ferrari and Harley-Davidson dealerships, opened in 2005.

== Deposed national leaders ==
In December 2012, the town was called a "magnet for deposed leaders given asylum in Russia" by a writer for The New York Times, who suggested that Barvikha might become the new home of Syria's president, Bashar al-Assad. Former leaders in the town reported by the NYT included Askar Akayev, formerly the president of Kyrgyzstan, Aslan Abashidze of Adjara, and the wife and family members of Slobodan Milošević. After fleeing his country in the wake of the Euromaidan protests in 2014, former Ukrainian president Viktor Yanukovych reportedly moved into a $52 million residence in the town as well.

== See also ==
- Barvikha Castle
- Zavidovo
- Novo-Ogaryovo
