= Barvikha (settlement), Odintsovsky District, Moscow Oblast =

Rural locality in Odintsovsky District, Moscow Oblast, Russia

Coordinates: 55°43′N 37°16′E

Barvikha (Russian: Барви́ха) is a rural locality (a settlement) in Odintsovsky District of Moscow Oblast, Russia. Population: 4,093 (2010 census); 4,228 (2002 census).

The settlement was built by General Kazakov in the 19th century as a resort place to increase the profitability of his estate.
