= Meyendorff Castle =

Official country residence of the Russian President

Coordinates: 55°43′27″N 37°16′20″E

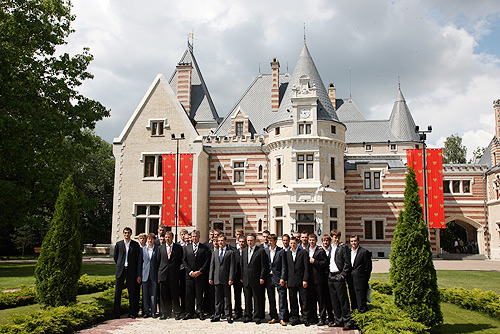
The Russian national football team with Dmitry Medvedev at Barvikha Castle, 2008.

Meyendorff Castle or Meindorf Castle (Russian: Мейендорф or Мейндорф) is a Châteauesque architectural extravaganza constructed at the turn of the 20th century to Pyotr Boytsov's designs as a private residence of the Swedish-Baltic German Meyendorf family, (Note: Meyendorf (Russian: Мейендорф) is also spelled Meiendorf, Meindorf, and Mayendorf.) (a cadet line of the Baltic German noble House of Uexküll). (Note: In 1679, Swedish lieutenant general Baron Jacob Ikskul at Castle Ikskile in Ikskile, Latvia, of the House of Iksskuli or the House of Uexküll, which used the letters H and X for its house, researched his family line and found that Baron Konrad Meyendorf in the 11th century established the Ikskule or Ikskile castle 28 kilometres (17 mi) from Riga in 1185. This castle and church built in 1186 were located on the high right bank of the Western Dvina or Daugava River. These facts led Jacob Ikskul to realize that the Ikskul line is a Meyendorf. Between 1932 and 1934, Alfred Rust discovered the Hamburg archaeological culture which had the oldest known arrows from about 14,000 to 16,000 years ago near Hamburg, Germany, at Meiendorf along the Stellmoore Paleolithic lake.) Located between Barvikha and Odintsovo along Podushkinskoye Highway (Russian: Подушкинское шоссе) A106 in Odintsovsky District, Moscow Oblast west of Moscow, the castle was constructed between 1874 and 1885.

== History ==
The Meindorf family (Note: The Meindorf family owned the entire Odintsovo okrug: nearby Usov and its railway, post office and sawmill, which is a closed area today, as well as Likov and the estate of Samynok.) (Note: Nadezhda Alexandrovna, the wife of the Minister of Foreign Affairs Baron Mikhail Feliksovich Meyendorf (1861–1941) who was the son of Feliks Kazimirovich Meindorf (Russian: Феликс Казимирович Мейендорф), held the estate from 1886 to 1917.) (Note: Nadezhda Alexandrovna Meyendorf, the daughter of Major General Alexander Borisovich Kazakov who obtained the Podushkino-Rozhdestveno estate on which the castle was built, received the estate as a dowry in 1886 upon her marriage to Colonel General Staff Evgeny Aleksandrovich Verigin in 1882 but became a widow in 1891 and then married Baron M. F. Meyendorf in 1898. Returning on a Baltic steamboat to St. Petersburg from a European capital with important papers in his briefcase in autumn of 1891, Colonel Verigin inadvertently dropped the case overboard, dove into the stormy Baltic Sea, retrieved the documents, but later had a fever and became ill. He died from his exposure in his wife's arms. Built before the castle, the original manor house burned down in 1892.) established their estate including the castle Barvikha or the castle of Baroness Meyendorf (Russian: Усадьба Мейендорф) here in 1904 prior to the Russian Revolution of 1917. In 1908, under the Russian ambassador to Denmark, Baron Karl Karlovich Buksgevden, Baron F. M. Meyendorf became a diplomat with rank as a Russia state advisor (equivalent to a colonel) and became the first secretary of the Russian diplomatic mission to Denmark which was a very esteemed honor because Tsar Nicholas II's mother, the Tsarina Maria Fyodorovna, was born a Danish Princess Dagmar of Denmark.

After the outbreak of the Great War the owners of the castle left Russia for abroad.

After the October Revolution the castle was occupied by Vladimir Lenin and other Bolshevik leaders. In 1935, the grounds were declared a high-profile, exclusive sanatorium. Mikhail Bulgakov, Sergey Korolyov and Yuri Gagarin were among those who vacationed at Barvikha. There is also a World War II cemetery marked by Yevgeny Vuchetich's miniature copy of his Mamayev Monument.

During Vladimir Putin's visit to the castles of the Loire valley in 2002, Jacques Chirac commented that Russia had nothing to compare with these French castles. Putin directed his staff to find a castle near Moscow and restore it. At only 20 minutes from Moscow, his staff transferred ownership of Bavikha to the Office of the President of the Russian Federation as the residence of the President and remodeled the 1,300 square metres (14,000 sq ft) manor to the grandest in Russia when it opened for use in November 2008. The Barvikha castle or Meyendorf Manor is officially called State Residence Barvikha (Russian: «Госрезиденция „Барвиха“») since November 2008 but others (RIA Novosti and Echo Moscow) refer to it as Meyendorf Manor or Meyendorf Castle.

In the 21st century, Barvikha Castle has been designated a country residence of the President of Russia. It was there that the Meyendorff Declaration of 2008 was signed by the leaders of Armenia and Azerbaijan in a bid to end the Nagorno-Karabakh conflict.

While Gorky-9 (Russian: Горки-9) was undergoing renovations, Dmitry Medvedev, as president of Russia, resided primarily at Barvikha until the Gorky-9 renovations were completed upon which Medvedev primarily resided at Gorky-9 which is 15 kilometres (9.3 mi) from Moscow.

== See also ==
- Massandra Palace
- Millerhof

== Books ==
- Блюмин, Георгий Зиновьевич (Blyumin, Georgy Zinovievich) (3 September 2012). Рублевка и ее обитатели. Романтическое повествование [Rublevka and its inhabitants. Romantic story] (in Russian). Центрполиграф (Centerpolygraph). ISBN 978-5-227-03668-1.
- Rust, Albert (1937). Das altsteinzeitliche Rentieriagerlaeer Meiendorf. Neumünster.
