= Nagorno-Karabakh Declaration =

Agreement between Armenia and Azerbaijan

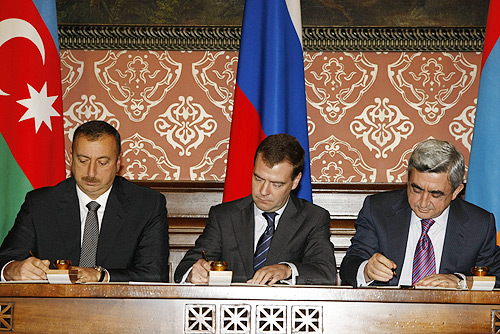
Presidents of Azerbaijan, Russia and Armenia Ilham Aliyev, Dmitry Medvedev and Serzh Sargsyan at moment of signing declaration about Nagorno-Karabakh

In the Nagorno-Karabakh Declaration (more formally, The Declaration of the Republic of Azerbaijan, Armenia and the Russian Federation), signed 2 November 2008 in the Meyendorf Castle in Moscow Oblast, the presidents of Azerbaijan and Armenia stated their intention to "contribute to a healthier situation in the South Caucasus and the establishment of regional stability and security through a political settlement of the Nagorno-Karabakh conflict on the basis of the principles and norms of international law and adopted in the framework of decisions and documents".

It reaffirmed the importance of continuing the mediation efforts of the OSCE Minsk Group in the light of the Madrid document dated 29 November 2007, and subsequent discussions.

The parties reached an agreement that "reach a peaceful settlement that must be accompanied by a legally binding international guarantees all its aspects and stages".

According to the Russian co-chair of the OSCE Minsk Group, Yuri Merzlyakov, the main value of the declaration is that it was the first since 1994, agreed to in the settlement of the Karabakh conflict, and concluded "directly between the two conflicting parties".
