= Rublyovka =

Prestigious residential area in west Moscow

Coordinates: 55°45′35″N 37°20′45″E

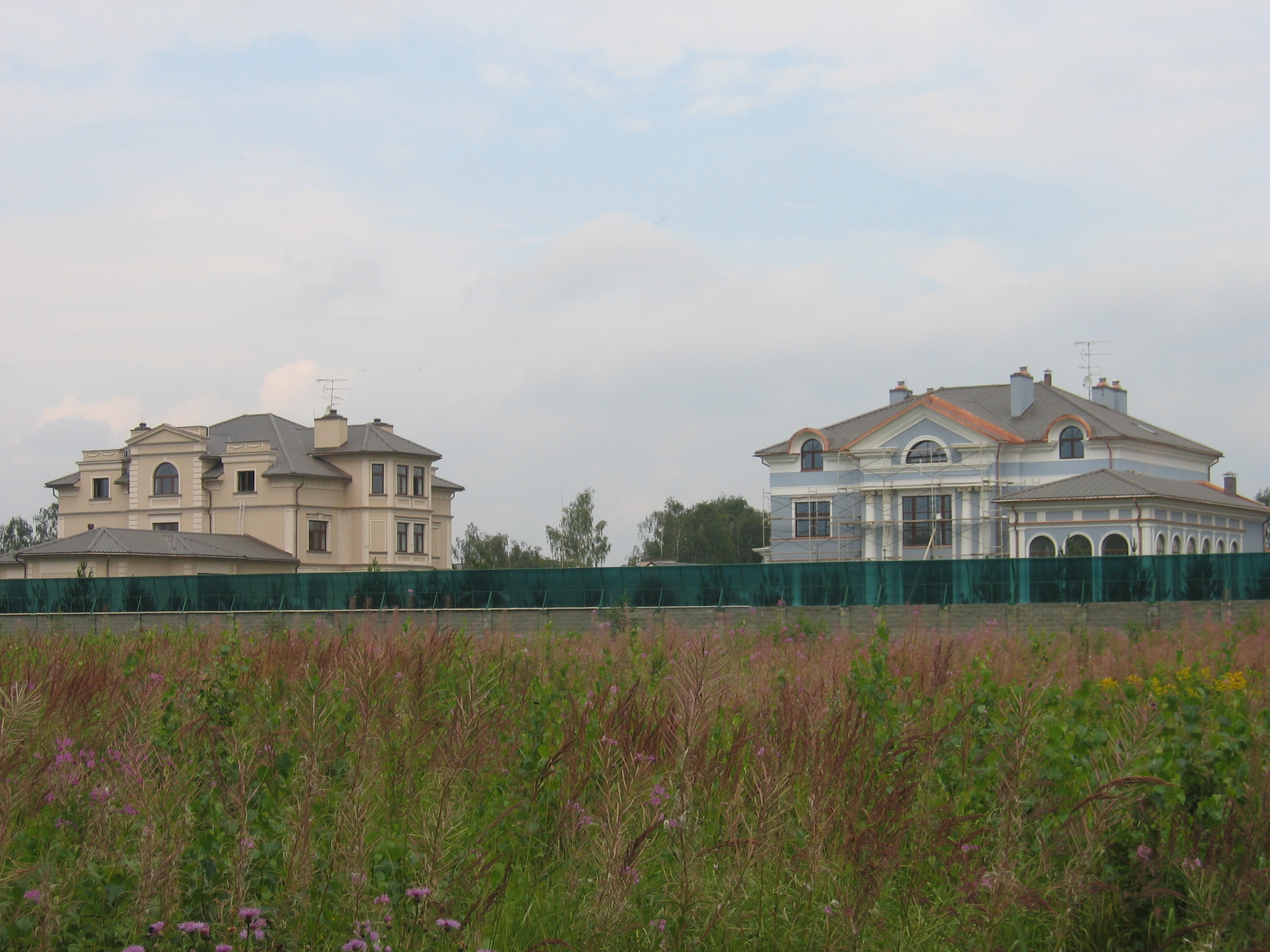
Usovo-houses

Rublyovka (Russian: Рублёвка) or Rublevka is the unofficial name of a prestigious residential area in the western suburbs of Moscow, Russia, located along Rublyovo-Uspenskoye Highway, Podushkinskoe, 1st Uspenskoe and 2nd Uspenskoe highways. There is no official administrative unit called "Rublyovka", but this name has become popular in society and in mass media. The area features good ecology and rather clear air in comparison to Moscow and the rest of its suburbs. Many Russian government officials and successful businesspeople reside in the gated communities of Rublevka. Real-estate prices there are among the highest in the world. The New York Times called it "home to the sprawling villas of Russia's ruling class".

== History ==
Rublyovskoe Highway has been a place for the privileged ever since it was the Tsars road in the 16th century: for the entire Romanov dynasty. Russian rulers Mikhail Fyodorovich, Aleksey Mikhaylovich, Peter the Great and Catherine the Great made pilgrimages to the Savvino-Storozhevsky Monastery by this road. Also this picturesque area was always the favorite place for the royal falcon hunting. Here, near the sovereigns, the Russian nobility also made their homes, particularly the Princes Yusupov, Shuvalov and Golitsyn. At the time of the Russian Revolution in 1917, the Zubalov family owned the estate Rubllevka. (Note: The richest Moscow oil magnate, Lev Zubalov (Russian: Лев Зубалов) was a Georgian who purchased the estate in 1904 from Sergey Pavlovich von Derviz (Russian: Сергей Павлович фон Дервиз), the eldest son of Pavel Nikolayevich von Derviz (Russian: Павл Николаевич фон Дервиз) a railroad baron that built the mansion in 1884 for his son Sergey. Zubalov was formerly known as Levan Zubalishvili but Russified to Lev Konstantinovich Zubalov and died in 1914.) (Note: Rublevka can be translated as the place of Rubles or the rich which after the Russian Revolution Rublevka was renamed by the Bolsheviks to the Red Gate (Russian: Красные Ворота) and Zubalov Olga Ivanovna, the widow of Lev Zubalov, gave the mansion to the Rumyantsev Museum.) (Note: Meindorf, who were relatives of the Zubalovs, owned the Barvikha estate.)

The area was where the dachas of Lenin and Stalin were located, (Note: Zubalovo-2 was Mikoyan's estate and Zubalovo-4 was Stalin's dacha. Both Stalin and Mikoyan had organized strikes against the Zubalovs' oil refineries at both Batumi and Baku.) as well as the summer residences of all the subsequent general secretaries, from Nikita Khrushchev to Mikhail Gorbachev. Many other prominent Bolsheviks settled here (Anastas Mikoyan, Felix Dzerzhinsky, Nikolai Yezhov) – side-by-side with famous scientists, artists and writers (Mstislav Rostropovich, Andrei Sakharov, Dmitry Shostakovich), and foreign diplomats. And they all lived on a small stretch of highway that is only 35 kilometers long. During the Soviet period, General Secretary Leonid Brezhnev may have gone for a walk and encountered Aleksandr Solzhenitsyn, who was being hunted by the KGB and hiding out at Mstislav Rostropovich's dacha.

In the mid-1990s, Rublyovka, which borders on the pristine and well-forested bank of the Moscow River was swiftly privatized by stars of show-business, the demi monde, officials and industrial magnates, and turned into a kind of a "millionaires' ghetto", or a Russian Beverly Hills, "where it is outrageous not to be good-looking".

== Geography and amenities ==
The district is 40 minutes to Moscow via a two-lane paved road; however, the road is sometimes closed due to travels by Vladimir Putin and other important Russian officials. There is a high-end shopping mall, Barvikha Luxury Village, where such brands as Prada, Gucci, and Dolce & Gabbana are offered. The mall includes Bentley and Ferrari/Maserati dealerships. There is also a wedding palace and a concert hall. Gated communities include Tagankovo.

== Notable residents ==
The area is known for its residents' high net worth.

- It was revealed in January 2020 that Mikhail Mishustin and his wife own a property in Rublyovka. Mishustin was named by President Vladimir Putin in January as the nominee to become the next Russian Prime Minister.
- Viktor Zolotov, former personal security chief for Vladimir Putin, currently chief of Russia National Guard (Rosguard), resides at his newer home with 1 hectare (2.5 acres) on the former Mikoyan estate or Zubalovo-2 which the Russia Ministry of Defense is the legal owner of. The one hectare of land for his new home is valued at 200 million rubles in 2014.
- Bashar al-Assad, former Syrian president, is alleged to live in Rublyovka following the Syrian civil war.

== Books ==
- Блюмин, Георгий Зиновьевич (Blyumin, Georgy Zinovievich) (3 September 2012). Рублевка и ее обитатели. Романтическое повествование [Rublevka and its inhabitants. Romantic story] (in Russian). Центрполиграф (Centerpolygraph). ISBN 978-5-227-03668-1.
- Блюмин, Георгий Зиновьевич (Blyumin, Georgy Zinovievich) (29 June 2015). Рублевка, скрытая от посторонних глаз. История старинной дороги [Rublevka hidden from prying eyes. History of the ancient road] (in Russian). Центрполиграф (Centerpolygraph). ISBN 978-5-227-05725-9.

== See also ==
- Barvikha
- Homes of the Russian "elite" in Rubliovkam Blog Tolkovatelia (in Russian)
- Insider unmasks rich Russians, BBC (in English)
