= Rublyovo-Uspenskoye Highway =

Road in Russia

Federal Highway A106
- Федеральная автомобильная дорога А106
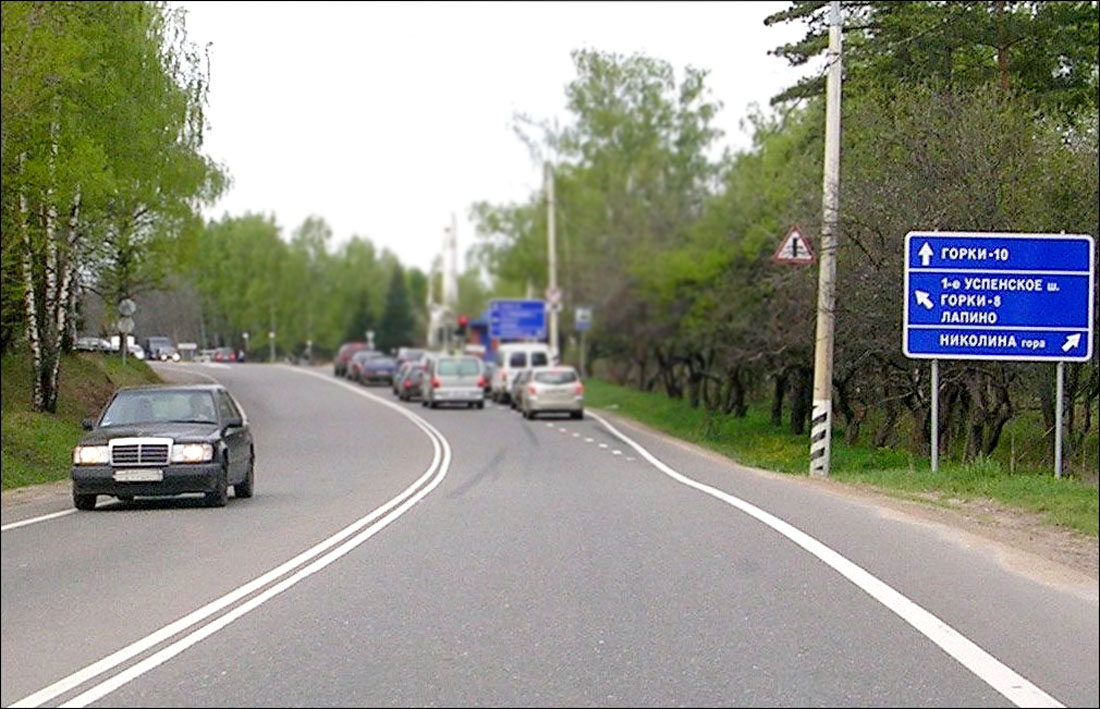
- Junction of Rublyovo-Uspenskoye Highway

Route information
- Length: 30 km (19 mi)

Major junctions
- East end: MKAD in Moscow
- West end: near Zvenigorod

Location
- Country: Russia

Highway system
- Russian Federal Highways
← A 105	→ A 107

The Rublyovo-Uspenskoye Highway (Russian: Рублёво-Успенское шоссе), designated as A106, is a Russian federal highway that runs from Moscow to Zvenigorod. It starts at the Rublevsky Highway at the intersection with the Moscow Ring Road, runs along the Moskva river and ends near Zvenigorod.

The Rublyovo-Uspenskoye Highway is a highway with improved surface. It is one of the shortest federal highways with its length at approximately 30 km (19 mi). Almost the entire length of the highway has two lanes and a speed limit of 50–60 km/h (31–37 mph). The road is maintained by the 7th District of the GIBDD.
