= Skolkovo, Moscow Oblast =

Rural locality in Odintsovsky District, Moscow Oblast, Russia

Skolkovo Ско́лково
- Village
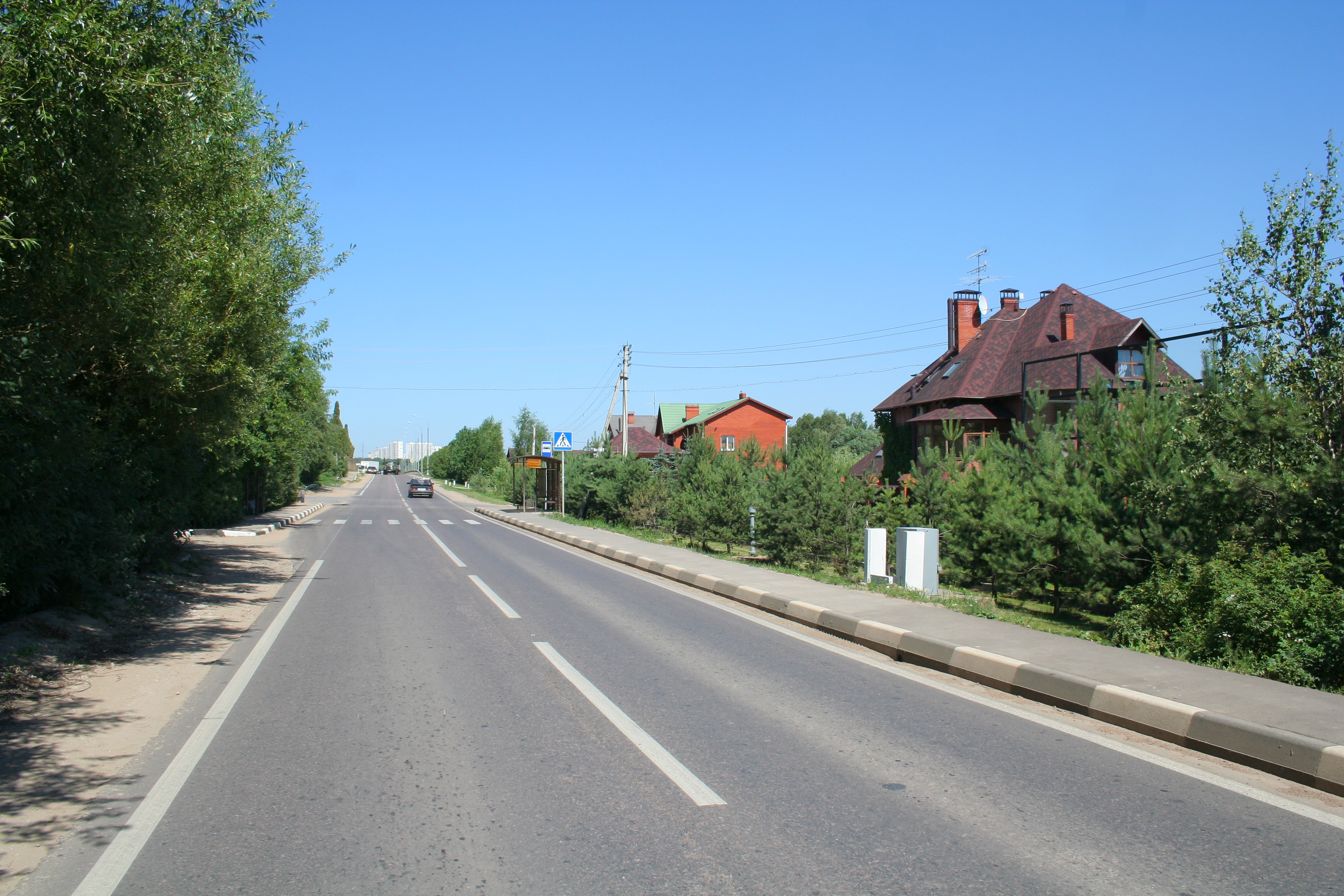
- Skolkovskoye Highway in Skolkovo

- Location within Moscow Oblast Location within Russia
- Coordinates: 55°41′16″N 37°22′07″E
- Country: Russia
- Region: Moscow Oblast
- District: Odintsovsky District
- Time zone: UTC+3:00

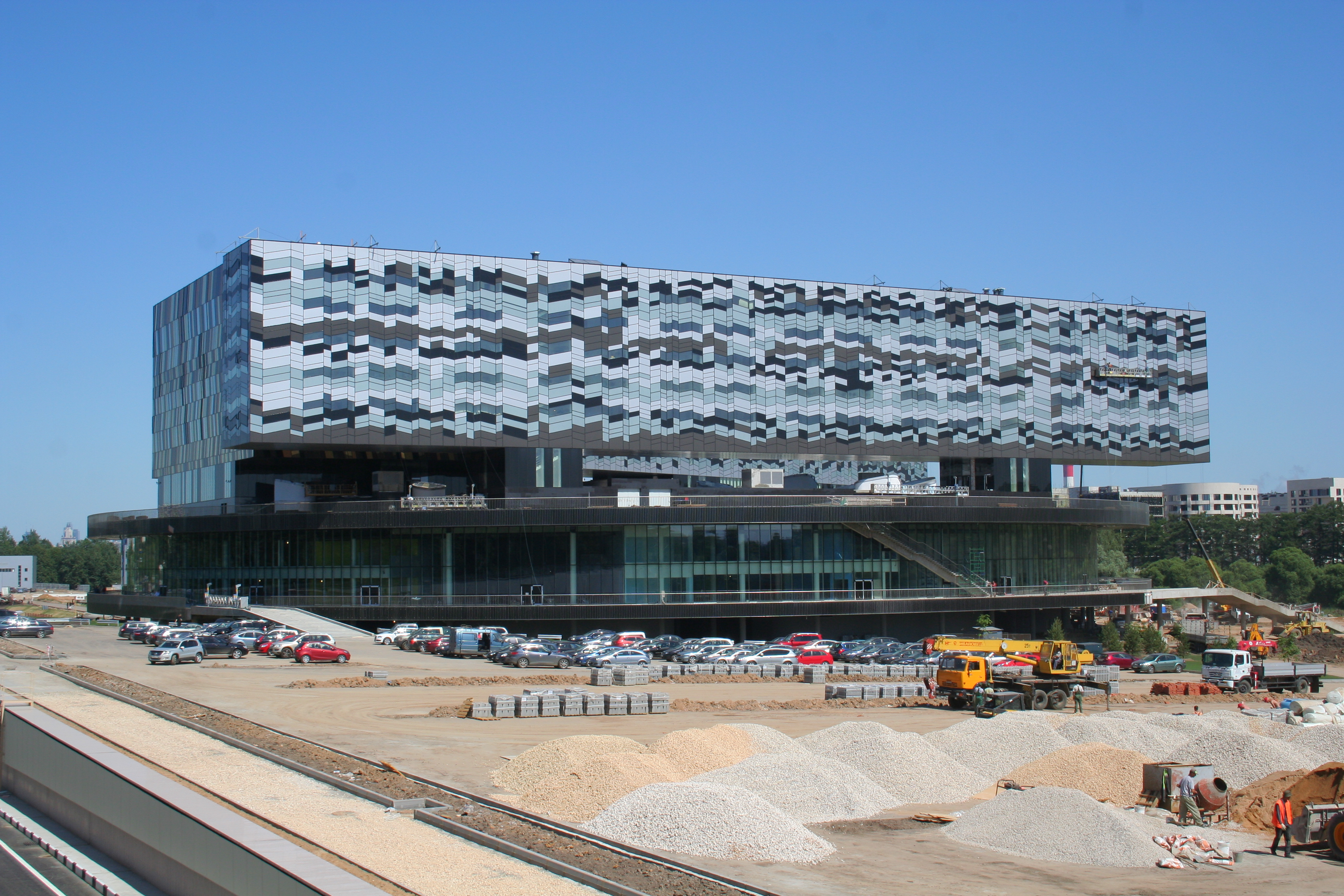
Skolkovo Moscow School of Management under construction

Skolkovo (Russian: Ско́лково, IPA: [ˈskolkəvə]) is a rural locality (a selo) in Odintsovsky District of Moscow Oblast, Russia, located 2 kilometers (1.2 mi) west of MKAD near the Setun River. Population: 325 (2005 est.).

The village has been known since the 16th century. In 1862, the population of the village lived in 23 homesteads comprising 226 people (104 male and 112 female).

In March 2010, Russian President Dmitry Medvedev announced plans to create Skolkovo Innovation Center–a modern technology complex to encourage scientific research and development. The construction of the center commenced in the vicinity of Skolkovo in 2011. Currently, another major project is realized near Skolkovo – the construction of the campus of Skolkovo Moscow School of Management.

== See also ==
- National Technological Initiative
