= Odintsovsky District =

Odintsovsky District Одинцовский район (Russian)
- District
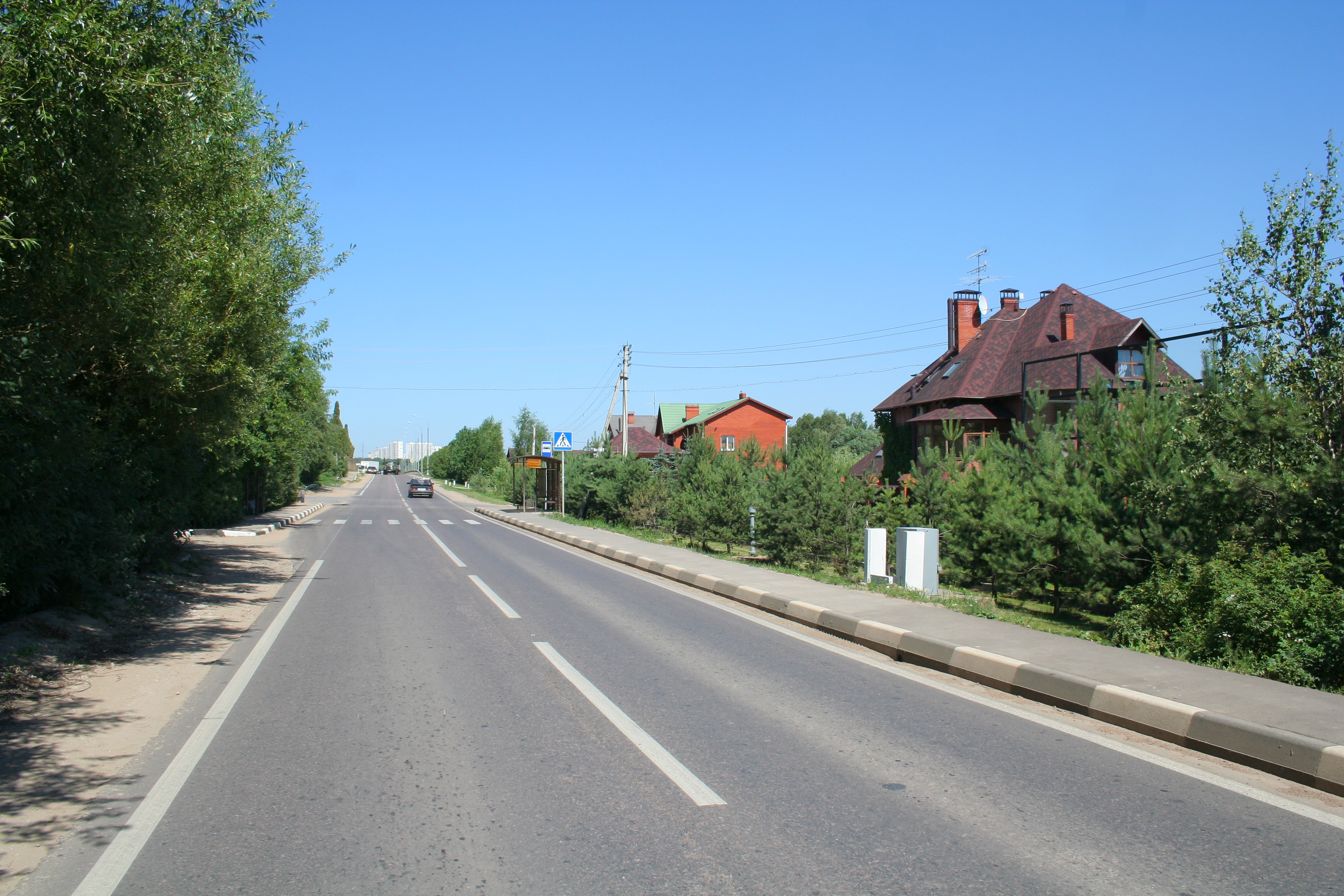
- Skolkovskoye Highway in the village of Skolkovo in Odintsovsky District

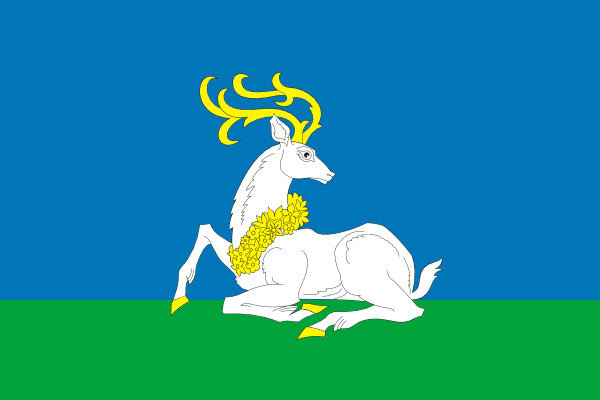
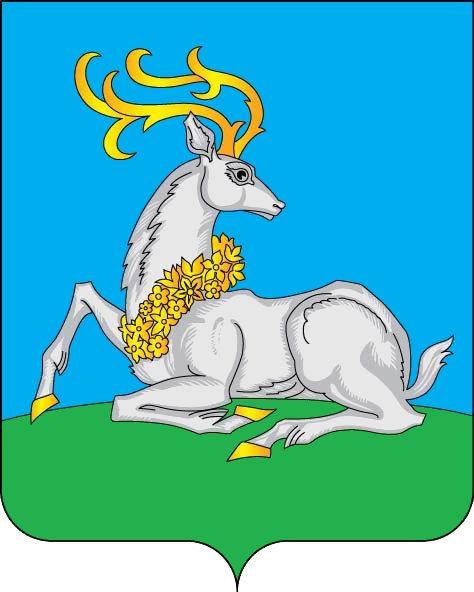
- Flag Coat of arms
- Location of Odintsovsky District in Moscow Oblast (before July 2012)
- Coordinates: 55°40′N 37°16′E
- Country: Russia
- Federal subject: Moscow Oblast
- Established: January 13, 1965
- Administrative center: Odintsovo

Area
  - Total: 1,289.628 km^{2} (497.928 sq mi)

Population (2010 Census)
  - Total: 316,696
  - Density: 245.572/km^{2} (636.028/sq mi)
  - Urban: 66.8%
  - Rural: 33.2%

Administrative structure
  - Administrative divisions: 3 Towns, 4 Work settlements and suburban settlements, 9 Rural settlements
  - Inhabited localities: 3 cities/towns, 4 urban-type settlements, 228 rural localities

Municipal structure
  - Municipally incorporated as: Odintsovsky Municipal District
  - Municipal divisions: 7 urban settlements, 9 rural settlements
- Time zone: UTC+3 (MSK)
- OKTMO ID: 46641000
- Website: http://odin.ru/

Odintsovsky District (Russian: Одинцо́вский райо́н) is an administrative and municipal district (raion), one of the thirty-six in Moscow Oblast, Russia. It is located in the western central part of the oblast and borders with the federal city of Moscow in the east, Leninsky District in the southeast, Naro-Fominsky District in the south, Ruzsky District in the west, Istrinsky District in the north, and with Krasnogorsky District in the northeast. The area of the district is 1,289.628 square kilometers (497.928 sq mi). Its administrative center is the city of Odintsovo. Population: 316,696 (2010 Census); 286,033 (2002 census); 129,343 (1989 Soviet census). The population of Odintsovo accounts for 43.9% of the district's total population. The city of Baikonur in Kazakhstan also belongs administratively to the district.

== Geography ==
The Moskva River with its tributaries flow through the district.

== History ==
The district was established on January 13, 1965.

== Attractions ==
Major attractions include the Kubinka Tank Museum, Grebnevskaya Church, and the Main Cathedral of the Russian Armed Forces and the Vjazjomy estate manor house.
