= List of ring roads =

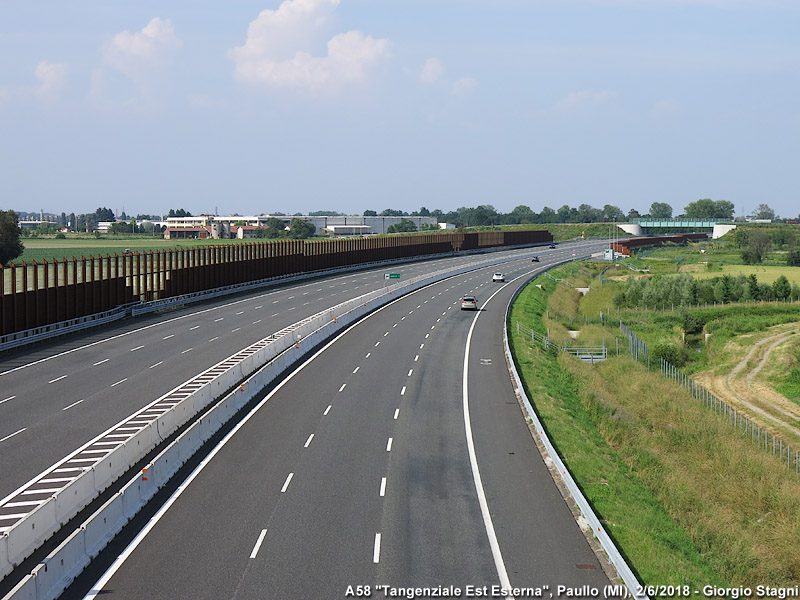
The Autostrada A58, the Milan external east ring road, Italy. Together with the Autostrada A50 (Milan west ring road), the Autostrada A51 (Milan east ring road) and the Autostrada A52 (Milan north ring road), it is the largest system of ring roads around a city in Italy, for a total length greater than 100 kilometres (62 mi).

Below is a list of ring roads from around the world encircling major cities.

== Africa ==
=== Egypt ===
- Autostrad road, Cairo
- Cairo Ring Road, Cairo

=== Ghana ===
- Ring Road East
- Ring Road Central

=== Morocco ===
- Rabat Ringroad, Rabat

=== Nigeria ===
- Benin City Ring Road
- Bauchi Ring Road, Jos
- Ibadan Ring Road

=== South Africa ===
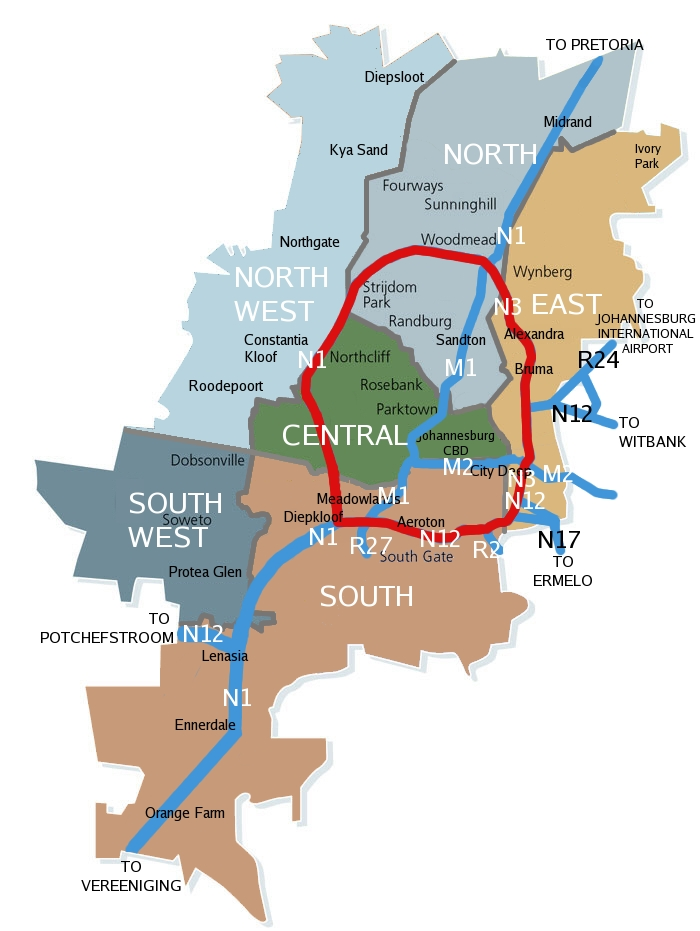
Johannesburg Ring Road

- Johannesburg Ring Road
- Durban Ring Road
- Cape Town Ring Road
- Pretoria Ring Road
- Polokwane Ring Road
- Bloemfontein Ring Road
- Pietermaritzburg Ring Road

== Asia ==
=== China ===
- Ring roads of Beijing: 2nd, 3rd, 4th, 5th and 6th
- Ring roads of Shanghai: Inner Ring Road, Middle Ring Road, S20 Outer Ring Expressway, G1501 Shanghai Ring Expressway
- 1st, 2nd, 3rd, 4th (formerly 1st Chengdu bypass highway) and 5th Ring Roads (formerly 2nd Chengdu bypass highway), currently exist in Chengdu and a new 3rd bypass highway (6th ring road) is under construction and scheduled for completion in 2017.
- G0102 Changchun Ring Expressway
- Inner Ring Road, Outer Ring Road, Guangzhou
- Shenyang Ring Expressway, Shenyang
- 1st Ring Road, 2nd Ring Road, 3rd Ring Road, 4th Ring Road, G3001 Zhengzhou Ring Expressway, G9905 Zhengzhou Metropolitan Area Ring Expressway, Zhengzhou
- Tangshan Ring Expressway, Tangshan
- Inner, Middle and Outer Ring Roads, Tianjin
- The second and the third ring roads in Xi'an
- Inner Ring Road, Second Ring Road and Third Ring Road of Wuhan

=== Hong Kong ===
The ring road that circles the New Territories area of Hong Kong.

In Hong Kong, a circular motorway, Route 9, as known as New Territories Circular Road, circles the New Territories and connects all the towns to the north of New Kowloon.

=== India ===
- Outer Ring Road, Largest in the nation, about 158 km, 8-lane ring road Inner Road Road, Hyderabad
- Inner and Outer Ring Roads and Elevated Beltways, Chennai
- Central, Inner Ring Road, Outer Ring Road, and Peripheral Ring Roads, Bangalore
- Delhi Ring Road, Delhi Outer Ring Road and the Western Peripheral Expressway, Eastern Peripheral Expressway National Capital Region
- Bandra-Worli Sea Link and the proposed Western Freeway Sea Link, Mumbai
- Inner Ring Road, Ranchi
- Ranchi Ring Road, Ranchi
- Outer Ring Road, Nagpur
- Outer Ring Road, Amaravati
- Jaipur Ring Road, Jaipur
- Inner Ring Road, Pune
- Outer Ring Road, Pune
- Coimbatore bypass, Coimbatore
- Mysore Ring Road, Mysore
- Jodhpur Ring Road, Jodhpur
- Outer Ring Road, Trivandrum
- Sardar Patel Ring Road, Ahmedabad
- Gulbarga Ring Road, Gulbarga
- Rourkela Ring Road, Rourkela
- Mandalsera Ring Road, Bageshwar
- Varanasi Ring Road, Varanasi
- Surat Ring Road, Surat
- Tumkur Ring Road, Tumkur.
- Thanjavur Ring Road, Thanjavur
- Tiruchy Bypass and Semi Ring Road, Tiruchirappalli
- Ring Road, Indore
- Madurai Ring Road
- Inner Central Ring Road (Old Padra Road/Vadodara Road – Race Course Road – Sarabhai Road – Sayaji Path – VIP Road – New VIP Road – Ring Road – (Ajwa – Waghodia) – (Waghodia – Dabhoi) – (Soma Talav – Tarsali) – (Sussen – Tarsali)), Outer Ring Road/NH48 bypass Chhani – Makarpura, Vadodara

=== Indonesia ===
- Jakarta Inner Ring Road
- Jakarta Outer Ring Road 1
- Jakarta Outer Ring Road 2 (One section completed)
- Bogor Outer Ring Road
- Bandung Ring Road (Padaleunyi Toll Road)
- Semarang Ring Road (Arteri Semarang Toll Road)
- Surabaya (Gresik – Gempol Toll Road)

=== Iran ===
- Azadegan Expressway: Tehran Southern and Western Ringway
- Basij Expressway: Tehran Eastern Ringway
- Agharabparast Expressway – Shahid Radanipour Expressway – Chamran Expressway – Kharrazi Expressway – Shahid Keshvari Expressway – Shahid Meysami Expressway – Habibollahi Expressway – Sayyad Shirazi Expressway – Mirza Kouchak Khan Expressway – Aghababaei Expressway – Shohadaye Soffeh Expressway – Kayyam-Khorram Expressway: These are known as Esfahan's third Traffic Ring
- Shahre Rey Ring Expressway
- Tehran Second Ring Expressway
- Shiraz Ringway
- Tabriz Northern Freeway
- Tabriz Southern Freeway

=== Japan ===
==== Fukuoka ====
- Expressway
  - Fukuoka Expressway Circle Route (35 km, 60–80 km/h)

==== Nagoya ====
- Expressway
  - Nagoya Expressway Ring Route (10.3 km, 50–60 km/h)

==== Osaka ====
- Expressway
  - Hanshin Expressway Loop Route (10.3 km, 50–60 km/h)

==== Sendai Metropolitan Area ====
- Expressway
  - Gurutto Sendai (58.9 km, 70–100 km/h)

==== Greater Tokyo Area ====
Expressways of the Greater Tokyo Area

- Expressway
  - Tokyo Expressway
  - Shuto Expressway C1 Inner Circular Route (14.8 km, 50 km/h)
  - Shuto Expressway C2 Central Circular Route
  - Tokyo-Gaikan Expressway
  - Ken-O Expressway (Includes Chiba-Tōgane Road, Shinshōnan Bypass, Yokohama Ring Expressway)
  - Tokyo Bay Ring Road (Shuto Expressway B Bayshore Route, Tokyo Bay Aqua-Line)
  - Kantō Ring Road (Kita-Kantō Expressway, Jōshin-etsu Expressway, Chūbu-Ōdan Expressway)
- National Highway
  - Japan National Route 16
  - Japan National Route 298 (Parallel to Tokyo-Gaikan Expressway)
  - Japan National Route 357
- Local Highway
  - Tokyo Ring 1 (Uchibori-dori, Eitai-dori, Hibiya-dori, Harumi-dori)
  - Tokyo Ring 2 (Sotobori-dori, Shin-ohashi-dori, Tokyo Highway 483, Tokyo Highway 484)
  - Tokyo Ring 3 (Kiyosumi-dori, Kasuga-dori, Gaien-higashi-dori, Kototoi-dori, Mito Highway, Mitsume-dori)
  - Tokyo Ring 4 (Gaien-nishi-dori, Tokyo Highway 437, Meiji-dori, Maruhachi-dori)
  - Tokyo Ring 5–1, 5–2 (Meiji-dori)
  - Tokyo Ring 6 (Yamate-dori)
  - Tokyo Ring 7 (Kannana-dori)
  - Tokyo Ring 8 (Kanpachi-dori)
  - Tokyo Bay Ring Road
  - Yokohama Ring 1 (Yokohama Highway 83, Kanagawa Highway 201, Yokohama Highway 84)
  - Yokohama Ring 2
  - Yokohama Ring 3
  - Yokohama Ring 4 (Kanagawa Highway 23, Kanyon)
  - Utsunomiya Ring Road
  - Takasaki Ring Road

=== Malaysia ===
==== Penang ====
===== George Town (Island) =====
- George Town Inner Ring Road
- Penang Middle Ring Road
- Penang Outer Ring Road

===== Butterworth (Mainland) =====
- Butterworth Outer Ring Road

==== Johor ====
===== Johor Bahru =====
- Johor Bahru Inner Ring Road
- Johor Bahru Middle Ring Road, comprising:
  - Pasir Gudang Highway
  - Johor Bahru Parkway
- Johor Bahru Outer Ring Road, comprising:
  - Second Link Expressway
  - Senai–Desaru Expressway

===== Others =====
- Segamat Inner Ring Road
- Kluang Inner Ring Road

==== Klang Valley/Kuala Lumpur ====
- Kuala Lumpur Inner Ring Road
- Kuala Lumpur Middle Ring Road 1
- Kuala Lumpur Middle Ring Road 2, comproising
  - Kuala Lumpur Middle Ring Road 2
  - Shah Alam Expressway
  - Damansara–Puchong Expressway
- Kuala Lumpur Outer Ring Road, comproising
  - North–South Expressway Central Link
  - Guthrie Corridor Expressway
  - Kuala Lumpur–Kuala Selangor Expressway
  - East Klang Valley Expressway
  - Kajang Dispersal Link Expressway
  - South Klang Valley Expressway

=== Nepal ===
- Kathmandu Ring Road
- Kathmandu Outer Ring Road (under construction)

=== Pakistan ===
- Lahore Ring Road
- Peshawar Ring Road
- Rawalpindi Ring Road (under construction)

=== Philippines ===
==== Metro Manila ====
- C-1
- C-2
- C-3
- C-4
- C-5
- C-6

=== Singapore ===
- Outer Ring Road System, comprising (from east to west):
  - Still Road South
  - Still Road
  - Jalan Eunos
  - Hougang Avenue 3
  - Bartley Road
  - Braddell Road
  - Lornie Road
  - Adam Road
  - Farrer Road
  - Queensway
  - Portsdown Avenue
- Yishun Ring Road, a ring road located in Yishun
- A ring road in Toa Payoh comprising Lorong 1 Toa Payoh and Lorong 6 Toa Payoh
- Bukit Panjang Ring Road, a ring road located in Bukit Panjang
- Minor ring roads in Woodlands
  - Woodlands Circle
  - Woodlands Ring Road

=== South Korea ===
==== Seoul ====
- Capital Region First Ring Expressway (Route 100), a complete outer ring road of motorway standard.
- The 2nd Capital Region Ring Expressway (Route 400)
- Inner ring road, a complete ring consisting:
  - Naebu Beltway (Route 66)
  - Dongbu Arterial Road (Route 61)
  - Gangbyeonbuk-ro (Route 70)

==== Daejeon ====
- Daejon Ring Road, a complete ring road consisting:
  - Daejeon Nambu Sunhwan Expressway (route 300), southern portion
  - Tongyeong–Daejeon Expressway (route 35), eastern portion
  - Gyeongbu Expressway (route 1), northern portion
  - Honam Expressway (route 251), western portion

==== Gwangju ====
- Ring Road, a complete ring road consisting:
  - Honam Expressway (route 25), northern portion
  - Route 77, the eastern, western and southern portion

=== Thailand ===
==== Bangkok ====
- Outer Ring Road – Kanchanaphisek Road – Motorway route 9, a complete ring road (grade-separated and controlled access) comprising:
  - Western Outer Ring Road, Bang Pa In to Suk Sawad
  - Eastern Outer Ring Road, Bang Phli to Bang Pa In, a partly tolled section
  - Southern Outer Ring Road, Bang Phli to Suk Sawad, a viaduct/bridge and fully tolled section
- Inner Ring Road – a complete ring road comprising
  - Ratchadaphisek Road (eastern portion)
  - Wong Sawang Road (northern portion)
  - Charan Sanit Wong Road (western portion)
- Bangkok Expressway – a fully tolled, complete ring (grade-separated and controlled access) comprising
  - Port – Dao Khanong Expressway (southern portion)
  - Phaya Thai – Bangkhlo Expressway (western portion)
  - Chalerm Mahanakhorn Expressway (eastern portion)
  - Asoke – Rachadapisek Expressway (northern portion)

==== Northern Thailand ====
- Ayutthaya – Route 32, 347 and 356, a complete outer ring road
- Ayutthaya – U Thong Road, a complete inner ring road, surrounding old city
- Chiang Mai – Route 121, a complete outer ring road
- Chiang Mai – Route 11 and 1141, a partial inner ring road
- Phitsanulok – Route 126, a complete ring road linking routes 11, 12 and 117
- Suphanburi – Route 357, a complete ring road linking routes 321, 322, 329 and 340.
- Saraburi – Route 362, a complete ring road linking routes 1 and 2.

==== North Eastern Thailand ====
- Buriram – Route 288, a complete ring road linking routes 218, 219 and 226
- Khon Kaen – Route 230, a complete ring road linking Route 2 and Route 12
- Roi Et – Route 232, a complete ring road linking routes 23, 214 and 215
- Ubon Ratchathani – Route 231, a complete ring road linking routes 23, 24, 212, 217 and 226
- Udon Thani – Route 216 'By pass Road', a complete ring road linking Route 2 with Routes 22 and 216

==== South Eastern Thailand ====
- Chonburi – Route 361, a partial ring road linking Route 3 with routes 315 and 344

==== Southern Thailand ====
- Surat Thani – complete ring road consisting of routes 401, 417 and 420
- Trang – Route 419, a complete ring road linking routes 4, 403 and 404

=== Turkey ===
Most of Turkish metropolitans have beltways with motorway standard.

- Istanbul: Has three beltways named as Otoyol 1 (inner beltway), Otoyol 2 (outer beltway) and Otoyol 7 (outest beltway). Also Kennedy Avenue and Eurasia Tunnel forms a somewhat ring road in the most southern section of the city along the Marmara Sea coast.
- Ankara: Otoyol 20
- İzmir: Altınyol, Otoyol 30
- Bursa: Otoyol 5 and Otoyol 22
- Antalya: Dumlupınar Bulvarı (West), Gazi Bulvarı (North) are in use. A new beltway project is planning on stage.
- Gaziantep: Otoyol 54
- Tekirdağ: D110
- Aydın: Otoyol 31
- Manisa: D565 and D250
- Çanakkale: D550
- Adapazarı: D100 and D650
- Edirne: Otoyol 3

=== Vietnam ===
==== Hanoi ====
- Partial Inner Ring road consisting:
  - Buoi, Lang, Truong Chinh and Vinh Tuy Bridge
- Outer Ring Road consisting:
  - Ring Road 3 (Route CT.37): Pham Van Dong, National Highway 5 (QL 5), Thanh Tri Bridge and Nguyen Van Linh
  - The 4th Hanoi Capital Region Ring Expressway (Route CT.38)

==== Ho Chi Minh City ====
- Partial ring road consisting:
  - National Route 1 (QL 1A), northern portion
  - Nguyen Van Linh, southern portion
  - Vanh Dai, incomplete eastern portion

== Australia ==
=== Australia ===
Australian Coast or nearby – Highway 1, ring road surrounds all of Australia

==== New South Wales ====
- Sydney – Sydney Orbital Network, complete ring road consisting of 11 Motorways
- Sydney – A9 (Sydney), a partial outer ring road
- Newcastle – Newcastle Inner City Bypass, an inner partial ring road

==== Queensland ====
- Brisbane – Orbital, a partial ring road comprising:
  - Gateway Motorway (M1), eastern portion
  - Logan Motorway (M2), southern portion
  - Western Bypass, a proposed western portion
- Brisbane – Inner City Bypass an inner partial ring road
- Townsville – Townsville Ring Road, a partial ring road comprising:
  - Douglas Arterial Road
- Mackay – Mackay Ring Road, a partial ring road
- Toowoomba – Toowoomba Bypass, a partial ring road

==== Victoria ====
- Melbourne – Metropolitan Ring Road, a partial ring road comprising:
  - Western Ring Road (M80)
  - Metropolitan Ring Road (M80)
  - EastLink (M3)
- Melbourne – Outer Metropolitan Ring Road, a partial outer ring road (proposed)
- Geelong – Geelong Ring Road, a partial ring road

==== Western Australia ====
- Perth Inner Orbital:
  - Reid Highway (northern)
  - Tonkin Highway (eastern)
  - Leach Highway (southern)
- Perth Outer Orbital (State Route 3):
  - Reid Highway (northern)
  - Roe Highway (eastern)
  - Roe Highway (southern)
- Bunbury
  - Wilman Wadandi Highway (formerly Bunbury Outer Ring Road)
  - Robertson Drive (or Bunbury Inner Ring Road)

== Europe ==
=== Austria ===
- Gürtel (Outer Ring), Vienna
- Ringstraße (Inner Ring), Vienna

=== Azerbaijan ===
- M1 Baku Ring, Baku

=== Belarus ===
- Minsk Automobile Ring Road (MKAD), Minsk

=== Belgium ===
- R0 (Brusselse Ring), Brussels
- R1 (Antwerpse Ring), Antwerp
- R2 (Wider ringroad, not completely built), Antwerp
- R3, Charleroi
- R4, Ghent
- R5, Mons
- R7, Liège
- R8, Kortrijk
- R9 (smaller ring), Charleroi
- R42 (smaller ring), Sint-Niklaas

=== Bulgaria ===
- Sofia ring road

=== Croatia ===
- Zagreb bypass (A2, A3, A4)
  - A second, 160 km (99 mi) bypass (proposed signing is A15) was announced to be part of the 2009–2012 four-year construction plan)
- Rijeka bypass (A7)

=== Cyprus ===
- Larnaca Beltway – A3

=== Czech Republic ===
- D0 (Prague Ring Road) (partially completed)
- Městský okruh (Urban Ring Road), Prague (partially completed)
- Road I/31 (Hradec Králové)
- Big City Ring (Velký městský okruh) in Brno
- Brno City Ring (Brněnský městský okruh, vnitřní městský okruh), the inner ring in Brno
- the three old Prague rings (I - inner, II - middle, III - outer) and many rings in other cities are not special express ring roads but routes signed on common streets and roads

=== Denmark ===
- Copenhagen City Ring (O2) and Outer Rings O3, O4, Motorringveje 3 og 4)

=== Estonia ===
- Tallinn ring road (Tallinna ringtee), around Tallinn, Estonian national road 11
- Tartu ring road (Ringtee), around Tartu, most of it is part of Tallinn–Tartu–Võru–Luhamaa road (E263)
- Põlva ring road (Põlva ringtee), around Põlva, Estonian national road 87
- Kuressaare ring road (Kuressaare ringtee), around Kuressaare, Estonian national road 76

=== Finland ===
- Kehä 0 (Ring 0), a conceptual approach to routing traffic away from the very centre of the city, to develop greater pedestrian access areas in the centre, the so-called "carless centre". Though this is the least legitimate in the sense of what is commonly thought as a ring road, merely consisting of ways to route traffic, it differs from the other ring roads in that it would consist of a fully circular network of routes around a focal point, rather than I, II and III, which are properly only semicircular, being as they are, limited by the sea on one side.
- Hakamäentie, by-passes inner city. The central part is built, remaining parts uniting Turku motorway with E75
- Kehä I (Ring 1), encircling Helsinki while also passing through Espoo, for local traffic
- Kehä II (Ring 2), traffic loadout highway through Espoo, for local traffic (Kehä II is not an actual ring road but only a stub – the complete ring is not yet even planned)
- Kehä III (Ring 3), bypass of Helsinki, part of E18, encircling Helsinki through Vantaa, Espoo and Kirkkonummi, for local traffic and long-distance traffic
- Turun kehätie (Turku Ring Road), encircling city of Turku and bypasses through Turku, Raisio, Lieto and Kaarina.
- Tampere Ring Road, encircling city of Tampere and bypasses Tampere, Pirkkala, Nokia and Ylöjärvi.

=== France ===
- Périphérique, Paris
- A86 autoroute ("Le Superpériphérique"), Paris
- A104 autoroute ("La Francilienne"), Île-de-France region.
- Périphérique de Toulouse (A620, A61, A62), Toulouse
- Boulevard périphérique de Lyon (A7, N383), Lyon. West segment is still under construction.
- Rocade de Bordeaux : (A630, N230), Bordeaux, Longest beltway of France.
- Boulevard périphérique de Caen (N814), Caen
- Boulevard périphérique de Lille (A22, A25, N352) Lille
- Boulevard périphérique de Nantes (N8444, N249), Nantes.
- Rocade de Rennes (N136), Rennes

=== Germany ===
- Inner Ring Road, Berlin Inner city ring road, Berlin
- Berliner Stadtring, Autobahn around the city of Berlin (incomplete)
- Berliner Ring (A 10), Berlin
- Bochumer Autobahnring (A 448 with A 40 and A 43), former Bochumer Außenring (only L705) around the city, Bochum
- Cologne Inner Ring (Bundesstraße 9), Cologne
- Cologne Outer Ring (A 1, A 3, A 4), Cologne
- Dortmund Wallring (ring road around the inner city)
- Dortmunder Ring (A 1, A 2, A 45), Dortmund
- Giessener Ring, (A 485, A 480, B 49, B 429), Giessen
- Mitteldeutsche Schleife (A 9, A 14, A 38, A 143), Leipzig, Halle
- Inner City Ring Road in Leipzig, also called Promenadenring (Ring of promenades)
- Mainzer Ring, ring of the autobahns A 671, A 60, A 643, A 66 and the short B 263 around the city of Mainz
- Altstadtring, innerst city ring road of Munich
- Mittlerer Ring Federal ring road around the city of Munich
- Münchener Ring (A 99), Munich (incomplete)
- Bundesstraße 4 R Ringroad in the city of Nuremberg
- Oldenburg has a ring of Autobahns around the city (A 28, A 29 and A 293)

=== Greece ===
- A5 Patras Bypass, Patras
- Attiki Odos (A65, A6, A621, A62), Athens
- Thessaloniki Inner Ring Road (the eastern part is the A24 expressway)
- Greek National Road 6 (EO6) (Larissa Beltway), Larissa

Athens is encircled by the system of Attiki Odos motorway with three main avenues, forming a Π around the Athens Basin. To the northern side, the main section (number 6) connecting Elefsina shipyards-industrial zone with the Athens International Airport in Spata and counts about 50 km. To the western side, Aigaleo Avenue, encircling Mount Aigaleo and to the eastern side, the Hymettus Ring. As supplementary avenues there are also NATO Avenue, running across the Elefsina Basin next to Mount Aigaleo, Katehaki Avenue, connecting NE (Papagou) and SE (Ilioupoli) suburbs of Athens aligned with Mount Hymettus and finally Varis-Koropiou Avenue, connecting the vicinity of Athens International Airport and the SE coast of Athens, near the suburb of Voula, in the back side of Mount Hymettus. To the south side (coast), Poseidonos Avenue (Or "Paraliaki (Παραλιακή): Greek for "Coastal (Road)") runs from Piraeus (Faliro Interchange) to Voula, aligned with the coast, until it meets Varis-Koropiou and then it continues to the countryside Sounio Avenue, towards Sounio and Lavrio.

The quality of the encircling system varies from motorway of high standards and fully computerised control and service (northern section of Attiki Odos) to more simple two-lanes avenue, like Aigaleo Avenue. Most of the system, maybe except the mountainous parts (Aigaleo, Katehaki and Hymettus Ring), is a high-speed traffic system of roads. Usually the most speedy traffic is noticed on the coastal Poseidonos Avenue, thus making it need increased attention.

=== Hungary ===
- Motorway M0 (Budapest)
- Section of Motorway M35 bypassing Debrecen

=== Iceland ===
- Route 1, which circles the entire country

=== Ireland ===
All ring roads listed are not arranged from previously existing roads.

- Dublin: M50 motorway (Dublin Port Tunnel, Northern Cross Route, Western Parkway, South Eastern Motorway)
- Limerick: Limerick Southern Ring Road (end of N7 route)
- Cork: N40 Cork South Ring Road
- Kilkenny: Kilkenny Ring Road (part N10/N77 routes)
- Galway: Galway City Outer Bypass (planned) (part of the N6 road route)
- Waterford: Waterford Bypass [under construction] (part of the N25 route)

Dublin has three generations of partial ring roads. Due to its location on the sea, there is no complete ring road as yet. with the combined South Circular Road and North Circular Road forming the oldest, and inner pair dating from the 19th century.

The M50 motorway forms the middle, most complete and most heavily trafficked (85k-90k cars/day) ring road with an eventual plan to form a complete ring via an undersea tunnel or bridge.

The Outer Ring Road forms the newest partial ring, running along the west of the cities outer suburbs. Eventual plans are to link it to sections of the R121 road which provides a similar service in the north west of the city, with land being reserved for this.

In addition, Dublin City Council has signed two "orbital routes" consisting of existing roads, but following these requires turning at many junctions.

=== Italy ===
Grande Raccordo Anulare, Rome, Italy

- Grande Raccordo Anulare, Rome
- Tangenziale, Milan (A50-A51 – A52)
- Tangenziale di Padova
- Tangenziale di Pavia (A54)
- Tangenziale di Torino (A55)
- Tangenziale di Napoli (A56)
- Tangenziale di Venezia (A57)
- Tangenziale di Bologna (RA 1)
- Tangenziale di Catania (RA 15)

=== Netherlands ===
The S100 that circles central Amsterdam (yellow) and the larger A10 (red) and its numerous connecting highways.

- Ring Amsterdam (A10), Amsterdam
- Ring Rotterdam (A4/A15/A16/A20), Rotterdam
- Ring Utrecht (A2/A12/A27/Zuilensering), Utrecht
- Centrumring Amsterdam (S100)
- Ring Almelo
- Ring Almere
- Ring Alkmaar
- Ring Alphen aan den Rijn
- Ring Apeldoorn
- Ring Barendrecht
- Ring Den Haag
- Ring Eindhoven (inner) and Randweg Eindhoven (A2/A67, outer; incomplete)
- Ring Enschede
- Ring Franeker
- Ring Groningen, Groningen
- Ring 's-Hertogenbosch
- Ring Leeuwarden
- Ring Sneek
- Ring Spijkenisse
- Ring Zwolle
- Ring Zoetermeer
- Ringweg Bruinisse
- Ringweg Kats
- Ringweg Harderwijk
- Buitenring Parkstad

The Hague is circled by four ring roads:

- The "Ring" is the main ring road, roughly 34 km long; It is also called the "International ring".
- Around the city centre, there is the "CentrumRING", roughly 11 km long.

=== Norway ===
- Oslo Ringveg, Oslo (three ring roads going around the city centre, with a mutual road (E18) in southernmost part of the city)
- Ringveg Vest, Bergen (Connecting RV 580 and RV 555)
- Ringveg Øst, Bergen (Not built E39 Bypassing Bergen city centre E16 bypassing Arna)

=== Poland ===
Kraków rings: existing, built and planned.

- Gliwice ring: A1 autostrada, A4 autostrada
- Katowice agglomeration ring: A1 autostrada, A4 autostrada, Expressway S1
- Kraków ring: A4 autostrada, Expressway S7, Expressway S52
- Lublin ring: Expressway S17, Expressway S19
- Łódź ring: A1 autostrada, A2 autostrada, Expressway S8, Expressway S14
- Piotrków Trybunalski ring: A1 autostrada, Expressway S8, Expressway S12
- Poznań ring: A2 autostrada, Expressway S5, Expressway S11
- Rzeszów ring: A4 autostrada, Expressway S19
- Warsaw ring: Expressway S2, Expressway S7, Expressway S8, Expressway S17
- Wrocław ring: A4 autostrada, A8 autostrada
- Szczecin ring: A6 autostrada, Expressway S3, Expressway S6
- Toruń ring: A1 autostrada, Expressway S10
- Tricity (Gdańsk, Sopot, Gdynia) ring: Obwodnica Trójmiejska

=== Portugal ===
- VCI, inner ring road in Porto
- CREP, outer ring road in Porto
- Segunda Circular, inner ring road in Lisbon
- CRIL, inner ring road of Lisbon's suburbs
- CREL, outer ring road of Greater Lisbon

=== Romania ===
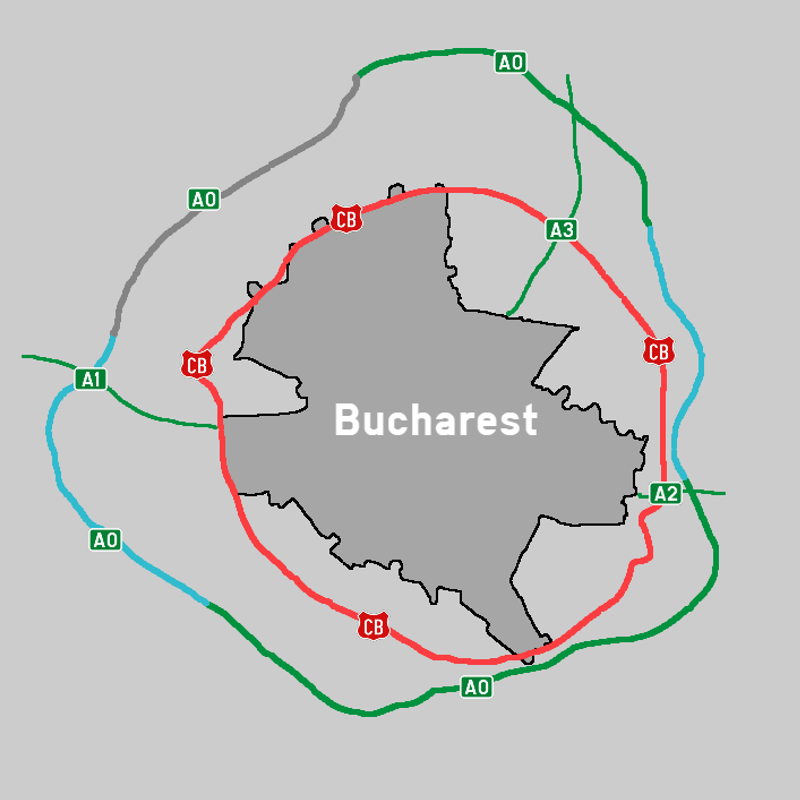
The Bucharest Ring Motorway Red: Old Ring Road Green: Opened sections on the ring motorway Light blue: Sections under construction Grey: Planned section.

- Centura București (CB, Bucharest Inner Ringroad), national road class around Bucharest, currently upgrading to expressway standard;
- Autostrada Centura București (ACB, Bucharest Outer Ringroad or A0), a motorway-class road circling Bucharest, partially opened.
- Sibiu bypass: The 17.5 km of motorway as a part of A1 motorway forming a partial beltway around Sibiu was fully completed on August 30, 2011.
- Autostrada Centura Constanţa (Constanţa West Bypass motorway), part of A4, completed in 2011. Currently the government has plans to extend it to the border with Bulgaria, at Vama Veche.

=== Russia ===
- Saint Petersburg Ring Road, Saint Petersburg

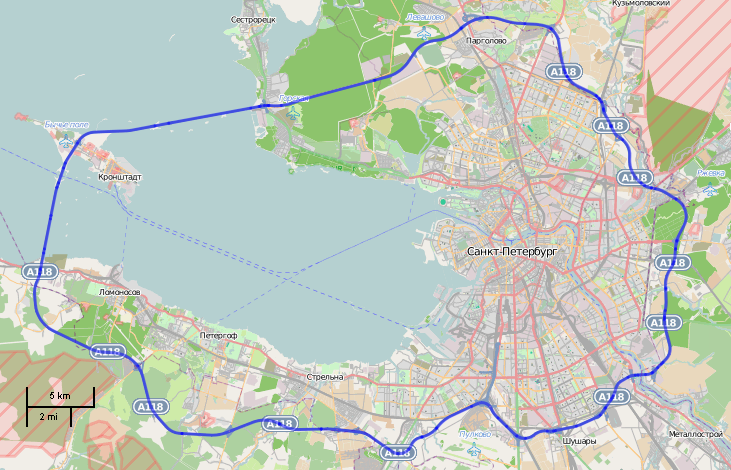
The Saint Petersburg Ring Road, fully encircling the city.

The Moscow Ring Road shown in dark blue.

Moscow, Russia has three beltways:

- MKAD — Moscow Ring Road, which follows city borders, is approximately 109 kilometres (68 mi)
- Moscow Small Ring Road — road A107, about 25 kilometres (16 mi) off MKAD, length is about 320 kilometres (200 mi)
- Moscow Big Ring Road — road A108, about 80 kilometres (50 mi) off MKAD, length is about 550 kilometres (340 mi)

Moscow Central Ring Road is a planned road which will consist of parts of Moscow Small Ring and Moscow Big Ring. Planned length is about 442 kilometres (275 mi), it will be opened in 2015.

Inside the Moscow city limits there are three ring roads: the central Boulevard Ring, which is generally two lanes each way with narrow tree-lined parks between the carriage ways; the Garden Ring, which has at least four lanes each way and no gardens; and the Third Ring Road, which was constructed in the late 1990s and early 2000s and combined existing roads and new highways. A fourth ring, between the Third Ring and the MKAD, is planned.

- Third Ring Road (Moscow)
- MKAD, Moscow
- Chelyabinsk Ring, Chelyabinsk
- Kaliningrad Road Ring, Kaliningrad

=== Slovenia ===
- Ljubljana bypass (Obvoznica)

=== Serbia ===
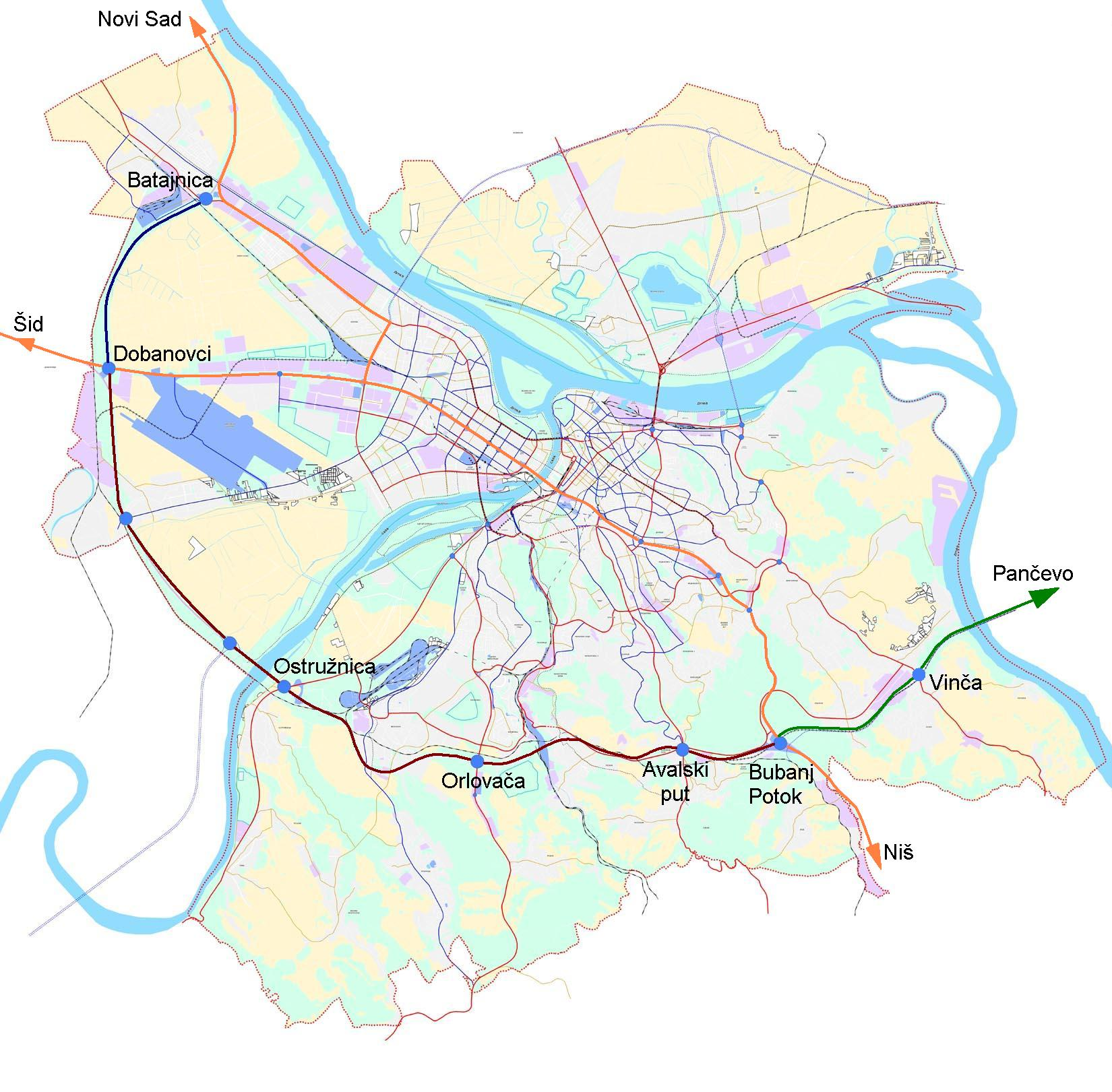
Plan of the Belgrade bypass, with major interchanges: Existing highways Section A, Batajnica-Dobanovci Section B, Dobanovci-Bubanj Potok Section C, Bubanj Potok-Pančevo

- Belgrade bypass (Obilaznica oko Beograda, under construction, total length is 69 kilometers) (A1)
- Novi Sad bypass (A1)
- Niš bypass (A1 / A4)

=== Spain ===
The system of ring roads in the Spanish region of Madrid.

Madrid, Spain is served by three beltways:

- M-30, which at a mean distance of 5.17 kilometres (3.21 mi) to the Puerta del Sol has been overtaken by the city in most of its 32.5 kilometres (20.2 mi) length.
- M-40, which borders Madrid at a mean distance of 10.07 kilometres (6.26 mi), with connections to the southern metropolitan towns and projects westwards to reach Pozuelo de Alarcón for a total length of 63.5 kilometres (39.5 mi).
- M-50, which was planned as a full ring but is not "closed" as of 2008, though projects by the Autonomous Community of Madrid to connect both ends through a tunnel are being aired. It is 85 kilometres (53 mi) long and services mainly the metropolitan area at a mean distance of 13.5 kilometres (8.4 mi).

Also, the half-loop M45 runs between the M40 and the M50 at the east, where the two beltways are more separated; and there are plans to build a fourth full loop, the M60, which would be over 120 kilometres (75 mi) long and encompass the whole metropolitan area of Madrid. This proliferation of orbital motorways is partially due to the traditional high radiality of the Spanish highway network, which routed most cross-country traffic through Madrid.

Other Spanish beltways include:

- B10 motorway, also known as Ronda Litoral coastal lower (south part) ring road in Barcelona (Catalonia)
- B20 motorway, also known as Ronda de Dalt, upper (north parth) ring road in Barcelona (Catalonia)
- B30 motorway, outer half-ring road in Barcelona (Catalonia)
- B40 motorway, the outermost ring road in Barcelona (Catalonia).(In project, known as "Quart Cinturó" (Fourth beltway))
- See also List of autopistas and autovías in Spain

=== Sweden ===
- Stockholm Ring Road (half-completed, eastern section under feasibility study)
- Malmö Inner Ring Road
- Malmö Outer Ring Road
- Linköping Inner Ring (C-ring) and Outer Ring (Y-ring)
- Västerås

=== Ukraine ===
Kyiv has 3 beltways:

- Small Beltway – completed
- Great Beltway – only west half-belt is complete, through further extension is frozen.
- Second Great Beltway – currently under construction.

Kharkiv has one of oldest ring roads in Ukraine. It was built in 1960–1970s. The road has been maintained in preparation for UEFA Euro 2012.

Other cities that have ring roads include:

- Ivano-Frankivsk
- Khust
- Kropyvnytskyi
- Lviv
- Odesa

=== United Kingdom ===
- Ashford, Ashford Ringway was formerly a one-way circuit of the town centre consisting of 3 to 4 lanes and part of the A292. The Elwick Road and Forge Lane sections now form part of the town's shared space scheme with an aim of taming the traffic and promoting commercial growth. Somerset Road is now a dual carriageway and Wellseley Road and Station Road are now a single carriageway section of the A2042.
- Aylesbury, the A4157 road in Aylesbury goes past Stocklake and Weedon Road near the Bicester Road near Fairford Leys
- Basingstoke, Basingstoke Ringway is a complete loop around the town centre; it is a dual carriageway except for a small unfinished section on the south-western side.
- Birmingham:
  - Birmingham Box orbital motorway (parts of M42, M6 and M5 motorways)
  - Outer (A4040) ring road (uses redesignated old roads, to the north it continues beyond the Box)
  - Intermediate (A4540) ring road, Middleway
  - Former inner (A4400) ring road reduced; now two through routes
- Bradford, A6177
- Bristol, A4174
- Coventry, A4053
- Edinburgh, A720 Edinburgh City Bypass
- Glasgow, Glasgow Inner Ring Road
- Kidderminster, not completed
- Leeds:
  - Leeds Outer Ring Road, M621, M1, M62
  - Leeds Inner Ring Road
- Leicester:
  - Leicester W/N 1st Orbital M1/A46 (Leicester Western Bypass)
  - Leicester Ring Road
  - Leicester Central Ring
- Liverpool, Queens Drive, the UK's first ring road, conceived as early as 1860 by James Newlands; construction began in 1903 under his successor John Alexander Brodie.
- London:
  - London Orbital Motorway or M25 motorway (including A282)
  - North Circular and South Circular
  - London (Inner) Ring Road
- Manchester:
  - M60 Orbital Motorway: Created by the amalgamation and renumbering of several existing motorways (M62, M63 and M66) and some new build to create a complete loop around the city of Manchester and seven neighbouring Metropolitan Boroughs to form one of the UK's busiest stretches of road.
  - Manchester Inner Ring Road: This runs around the city centres of Manchester and Salford. To the south, one third is elevated motorway (the Mancunian Way), with the remainder being at-grade urban clearway.
- Oxford, Oxford Ring Road
- Paignton, Torquay, A380 road
- Paisley, Renfrewshire
- Reading, Berkshire, Inner Distribution Road
- Redditch, B4160
- Sheffield:
  - Sheffield Outer Ring Road
  - Sheffield Inner Ring Road
- Stourbridge, A491
- Walsall, A4148
- Watford, A411
- Wolverhampton, A4150

== North America ==
=== Canada ===
==== Alberta ====
- Stoney Trail, Calgary
- Anthony Henday Drive, Edmonton
- Inner Ring Road (170 Street, Whitemud Drive, Wayne Gretzky Drive, Yellowhead Trail), Edmonton

==== British Columbia ====
- University of Victoria, Victoria, British Columbia - encircles the main campus area

==== Manitoba ====
- Perimeter Highway, Winnipeg

==== New Brunswick ====
- Route 15, Moncton

==== Newfoundland and Labrador ====
- Outer Ring Road, Metro St. John's
- Pitts Memorial Drive, Metro St. John's
- Lewin Parkway, Corner Brook

==== Nova Scotia ====
- Nova Scotia Highway 111, Dartmouth, Nova Scotia, in the Halifax Regional Municipality
- Nova Scotia Highway 125, Cape Breton Regional Municipality

==== Ontario ====
- Lincoln M. Alexander Parkway and Red Hill Valley Parkway, Hamilton
- Southwest and Southeast Bypasses and Northwest Bypass, Sudbury (partial)
- Thunder Bay Expressway, Thunder Bay (partial)
- Highway 407 and Highway 35/115, Greater Toronto Area

==== Quebec ====
- Montreal
  - Autoroute 30, South Shore of Montreal
  - Autoroute 640, North Shore of Laval – not completed and probably won't be completed from Oka to the A-40 near Hudson and from Charlemagne to the A-30 near Varennes
- Quebec City
  - Autoroute 40, north of Quebec City
- Sherbrooke
  - Autoroute 410, entire highway — north leg
  - Autoroute 10, exits 141 to 143 — northwest leg
  - Autoroute 610, entire highway — west & south legs

==== Saskatchewan ====
- Ring Road, Regina
- Circle Drive, Saskatoon

=== Cuba ===
==== Camagüey Province ====
- Agramonte Beltway, in the Barrio Agramonte, Florida
- Beltway Avenue, bypass around Nuevitas to Barrio Obrero
- Esmeralda Beltway, bypass of the CN
- North Beltway, bypass of the CC
- South Beltway, bypass of the CC

==== Ciego de Avila Province ====
- Morón Beltway, bypass of the 5–151
- North Beltway, bypass of the CC
- South Beltway, unfinished beltway south of the city of Ciego de Avila

==== Cienfuegos Province ====
- Cienfuegos Beltway, beltway on the eastern side of the city of Cienfuegos

==== Guantánamo Province ====
- South Beltway, beltway south of the city of Guantánamo
- West Beltway, beltway west of the city of Guantánamo

==== Granma Province ====
- Bayamo Beltway, west and south of the city of Bayamo
- Camilo Cienfuegos Beltway, south-east of the city of Manzanillo

==== Holguín Province ====
- Holguín Beltway, south of the city of Holguín, bypass of the CC

==== La Habana Province ====
- Primer Anillo, first beltway of Havana
- Segundo Anillo (2–400 and Calle 100), second beltway of Havana

==== Las Tunas Province ====
- North Beltway, bypass north of the city of Las Tunas
- Puerto Padre Beltway, south-east of the city of Puerto Padre, bypass of the CN
- South Beltway, bypass of the CC

==== Matanzas Province ====
- Cárdenas Beltway, bypass of the CN
- Matanzas Beltway, bypass of the CC
- Autopista Sur, motorway beltway on the south of Varadero

==== Sancti Spíritus Province ====
- Sancti Spíritus Beltway, beltway on the eastern side of the city or Sancti Spíritus

==== Santiago de Cuba Province ====
- Santiago de Cuba Beltway, on the east and south of the city of Santiago de Cuba
- Songo Beltway, east of the town of Alto Songo

==== Villa Clara Province ====
- Encrucijada Beltway, bypass of the CN
- Remedios Beltway, bypass of the CN
- Santa Clara Beltway, beltway around the whole city of Santa Clara
- Santo Domingo Beltway, unpaved beltway on the west of Santo Domingo
- Vueltas Beltway, unpaved beltway on the west of San Antonio de las Vueltas

=== Mexico ===
- Anillo Periférico, Mexico City. The beltway gained major media attention when the Mexico City mayor, Andrés Manuel López Obrador, started a project to turn a southern section of the ring into a two-story highway. The second floor was finished in 2006.

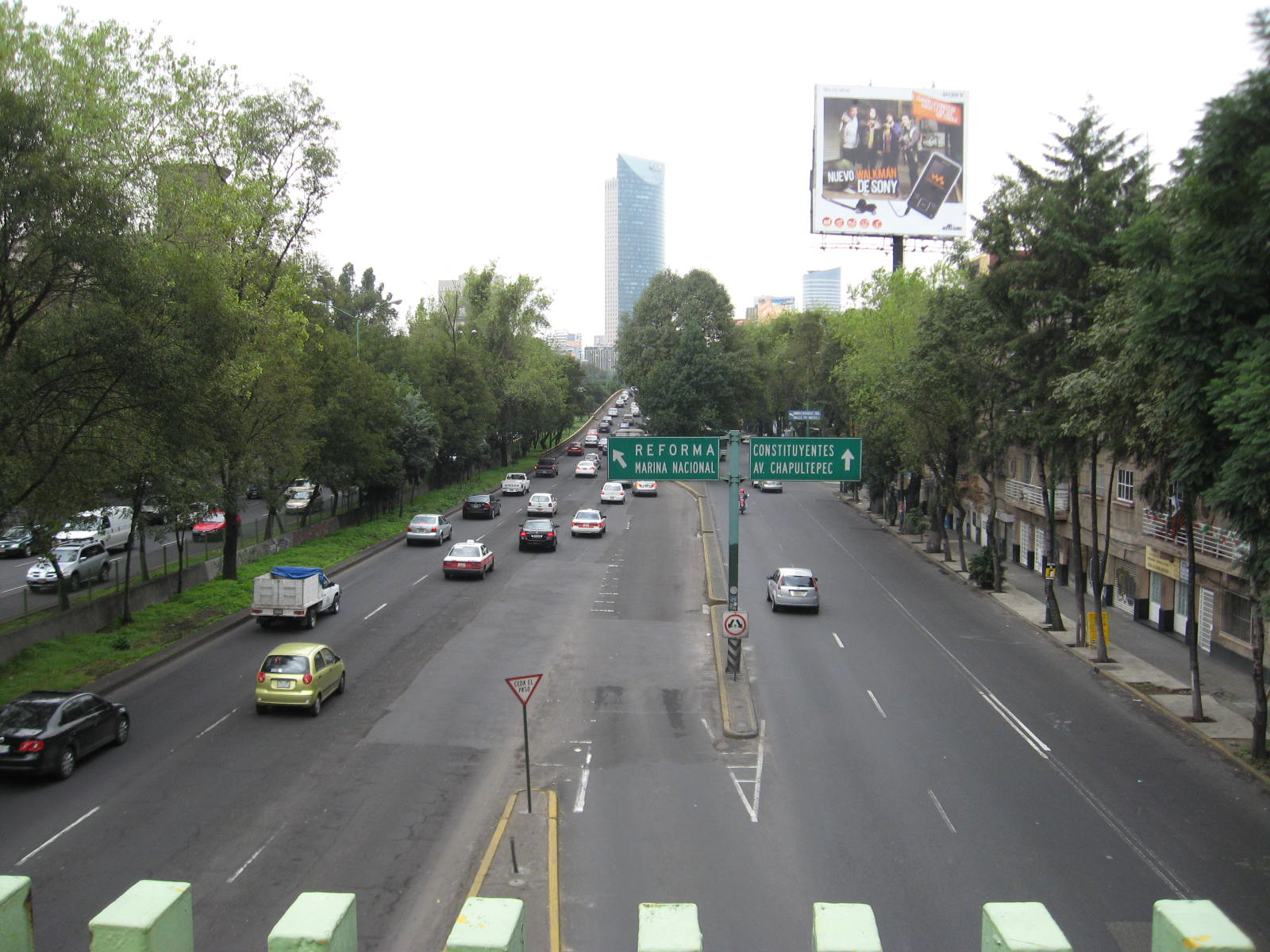
A portion of the Circuito Interior, José Vasconcelos Avenue between Colonia Condesa and Colonia San Miguel Chapultepec, looking east in Mexico City.

- Circuito Interior, Mexico City. The inner beltway inside Mexico City proper.
- Libramiento Arco Norte a toll road partly under construction being built around Mexico City.
- Periférico Manuel Gómez Morín, Guadalajara, Jalisco. The ring has a gap: it starts at the Federal Highway 44, circles around the city as a 3+3 lane highway, becomes a 2+2 lane road in the Tonalá municipality, and ends abruptly in the Federal Highway 90.
- Macrolibramiento, Guadalajara, Jalisco. An outer beltway that bypasses the city from the Zapotlanejo expressway to the Tepic expressway with the goal of relieving the current beltway from its heavy cargo traffic.
- Anillo Interno 210, Monterrey, Nuevo León. The beltway is almost a complete 3+3 lane highway. In clockwise it starts in the intersection with Avenida Constitución and continues until Avenida Gonzalitos – Fidel Velazquez, then Avenida Nogalar, Avenida Los Angeles, until the intersection Churubusco – Avenida Constitución. The beltway is a complete freeway except for the part from Avenida Los Angeles – Churubusco until Avenida Constitución (east part of the Beltway).
- Periférico Ecológico, Puebla, Puebla. An incomplete ringroad which passes through most of the municipalities that conform the Metropolitan Area of Puebla.
- Tijuana-Rosarito Autopista, Tijuana, Baja California. Currently under construction, it will form a bypass around Tijuana connecting Federal Highway 2 to Federal Highway 1 in Ensenada.
- Anillo Periférico Licenciado Manuel Berzunza, Mérida, Yucatán. The outer ring road stretches over 50 kilometers and comprises 6 lanes (3 per direction). It currently features 20 bridges functioning as road distributors that interconnect the city with other municipalities and highways, notably linking to Federal Highway 261 (to Progreso) and Federal Highway 180 (to Cancún).

=== United States ===
==== Alabama ====
- Interstate 459, partial beltway around Birmingham
- Ross Clark Circle, a surface street (as opposed to a controlled-access highway) encircling Dothan—the first such 'ring road' in the United States, opening in 1958. Also known as State Route 210
- State Route 152, surface street encircling Montgomery
- Boll Weevil Circle, a surface street encircling Enterprise

==== Arkansas ====
- Interstate 430 and Interstate 440, completed segments of a planned full beltway around Little Rock

==== Arizona ====
- State Loop Route 101, Phoenix Metropolitan Area
- State Loop Route 202, Phoenix Metropolitan Area
- State Loop Route 303, Phoenix Metropolitan Area

==== California ====
- Interstate 405, Interstate 605, and Interstate 210 a partial loop around the Los Angeles Basin
- State Route 54, State Route 125, and State Route 52, a partial loop around San Diego
- Interstate 80 and Capital City Freeway, Sacramento
- State Route 85, State Route 237, Interstate 880, and U.S. Route 101, forms a loop around Silicon Valley
- Interstate 280 and Interstate 680, partial beltway around the San Francisco Bay Area
- U.S. Route 101 (Via Interstate 80 in San Francisco), Interstate 280 (California) (Via the Alemany Maze), Interstate 880 (Via Interstate 280) and Interstate 80 (Via the San Francisco-Oakland Bay Bridge, forms a loop around the San Francisco Peninsula and the East Bay (San Francisco Bay Area)
- Grand Boulevard is a circular surface street that circles Corona, California

==== Colorado ====
- Interstate 225, Aurora
- Colorado State Highway 470, E-470, and the Northwest Parkway, Denver Metropolitan Area

==== Connecticut ====
- Interstate 91/Interstate 291/Interstate 491 (unfinished Hartford Beltway)

==== District of Columbia ====
- Interstate 495 (Capital Beltway) (Primarily in Maryland and Virginia)

==== Florida ====
- Interstate 295, Jacksonville
- Interstate 10/State Road 263, Tallahassee
- State Road 417/429/451, Orlando (planned beltway system)
- State Road 570, Lakeland
- State Road 826 (de facto), Miami
- Homestead Extension of Florida's Turnpike (de facto), Miami
- Tampa Bay Area Beltway (proposed)

==== Georgia ====
- Interstate 285 (Atlanta Bypass), Atlanta
- Interstate 520/Interstate 20 (Bobby Jones Expressway/Carl Sanders Highway) Augusta
- State Route 10 Loop, Athens
- State Route 120 Loop (Marietta Parkway), Marietta (a surface street)

==== Hawaii ====
- Route 11, Route 19, and Route 190 form Hawaii Belt Road on the Island of Hawaii. It is the largest completed beltway system in the United States & its territories. This beltway is officially called Māmalahoa Highway.
- Route 160 in West of the Island of Hawaii
- Route 270(ʻAkoni Pule Highway) in North of Island of Hawaii
- Route 30(Honoapi'ilani Highway) in West Maui
- Route 36 and Route 360 form the Hana Highway in North, Northeast, East, and Southeast of the Island of Maui.
- Route 377, Kula, Maui
- Route 450(Kamehameha V Highway) in Southeast and East of the Island of Molokai
- Route 540(Halewili Road) in South Kauai
- Route 581 in East Kauai
- Route 72(Kalanianaʻole Highway) on Oahu
- Route 80, Route 83, Route 99 and Route 830 form Kamehameha Highway on Oahu(the most populated of all the Hawaiian Islands).
- Hauula Homestead Road, Hauula, Oahu
- Naniloa Loop, Laie, Oahu

==== Illinois ====
- Interstate 80/Interstate 280, Quad Cities (also enters Iowa)
- Interstate 294, Chicago
- Interstate 474, Peoria

==== Indiana ====
- Interstate 465, Indianapolis
- Interstate 69/Interstate 469, Fort Wayne
- Interstate 265/Interstate 65/Interstate 264/Interstate 64, Jeffersonville

==== Iowa ====
- Interstate 35, Interstate 80, U.S. Route 65, and Iowa Highway 5, a continuous beltway around Des Moines
- Interstate 80 and Interstate 280, Quad Cities also enters Illinois

==== Kansas ====
- Interstate 435, Kansas City (second-longest beltway in the United States)
- Interstate 235, Wichita
- Interstate 470, Topeka

==== Kentucky ====
- Ring Road, Elizabethtown (a surface street)
- Interstate 264 (Henry Watterson Expressway), Louisville
- Interstate 265 (Gene Snyder Freeway), Louisville
- Man o' War Boulevard, Lexington
- New Circle Road, Lexington (mostly freeway, partly surface street)

==== Louisiana ====
- Interstate 55, Interstate 10 and Interstate 12 around New Orleans
- Interstate 220, Shreveport
- Interstate 210, Lake Charles
- Ambassador Caffery Parkway, Lafayette (partially constructed boulevard loop around Lafayette)
- The LRX or Lafayette Regional Xpressway (access-controlled toll road which serves the Lafayette metropolitan area)

==== Maryland ====
- Interstate 695 (also known as the Baltimore Beltway, officially designated as the McKeldin Beltway), Baltimore
- Interstate 495 (Capital Beltway), Washington, D.C.

==== Massachusetts ====
- Massachusetts Route 128, cosigned with Interstate 95, Boston (not fully circumferential due to city's seaside location)
- Interstate 495, Boston (not fully circumferential due to city's seaside location)
- I-495 forms part of a complete beltway around Lawrence. I-495 runs along this beltway between exits 40 and 47. The rest of the beltway is formed by Interstate 93 between exits 44 and 48 on that highway, and the entirety of Route 213 (AKA the "Loop Connector", which lent its name to a strip mall in Methuen).

==== Michigan ====
- Interstate 275/Interstate 696, Detroit
- Interstate 96/Interstate 196/M-6, Grand Rapids
- Interstate 94/M-14/U.S. Route 23, Ann Arbor (not complete due to missing connections at I-94 and M-14 west of Ann Arbor)
- Interstate 96/Interstate 69/Interstate 496/U.S. Route 127, Lansing
- M-185, Mackinac Island

==== Minnesota ====
- Interstate 94, Interstate 494, and Interstate 694, Minneapolis-St. Paul
- Minnesota State Highway 100, Minneapolis-St. Paul (now truncated, never all-expressway)

==== Mississippi ====
- Interstate 220, Jackson

==== Missouri ====
- Interstate 435, Kansas City (second-longest beltway in the United States)
- Interstate 255/Interstate 270, St. Louis

==== Nebraska ====
- Interstate 680, partial beltway around the Omaha-Council Bluffs metropolitan area

==== Nevada ====
- Bruce Woodbury Beltway (Interstate 215/County Route 215), Las Vegas
- McCarran Boulevard (State Route 659), Reno

==== New Hampshire ====
- Interstate 293 and Interstate 93, Manchester

==== New Jersey ====
- Interstate 287, New York City
- Interstate 295, Trenton

==== New York ====
- Interstate 287, Interstate 95, Interstate 278, New York State Route 440, and New Jersey Route 440 around Manhattan, New York City
- Interstate 278, Belt Parkway, Cross Island Parkway, Interstate 678, and Grand Central Parkway around Brooklyn, and Queens, New York City
- Interstate 290, Buffalo
- Interstate 590, Rochester
- Inner Loop, Rochester
- Interstate 481, Syracuse
- Interstate 787, Interstate 90, and Interstate 87 around Albany

==== North Carolina ====
- Interstate 485 (Outerbelt), Charlotte (Finished June 5, 2015)

These ring roads are all unfinished except for I-240/I-40 serving Asheville, I-840/I-85/I-73 serving Greensboro, I-440/I-40 serving Raleigh, I-485 and I-277/I-77 and Charlotte Route 4.

Other Freeway loops

- Interstate 140, Wilmington (partial, unfinished)
- Interstate 240/Interstate 40, Asheville
  - Does not fully function as a ring road since motorists cannot exit I-40 westbound to I-240 eastbound, nor I-240 westbound to I-40 eastbound.
- Interstate 440/Interstate 40 (Beltline), Raleigh
- Interstate 540/NC 540 (Outer Loop), Raleigh (unfinished)
- Interstate 840/Interstate 85/Interstate 73 (Greensboro Urban Loop), Greensboro
- Interstate 274/Interstate 74 (Winston-Salem Beltway), Winston-Salem (under construction)
- Interstate 295/Interstate 95 (Fayetteville Outer Loop), Fayetteville (unfinished)
- C.F. Harvey Parkway
  - Is mostly freeway-grade and serves as a partial loop around Kinston.
- US 64
  - a 12.9 freeway stretch of the route in the city limits of Asheboro forms a partial loop around the central area of the city. Also forms a similar partial loop in nearby Pittsboro.

Nonfreeway loops

- Apex Peakway (under construction)
- Cary Parkway (partial loop)
- Charlotte Route 4
- Judd Parkway (Fuquay Varina)
- Maynard Road (Cary inner loop)
- NC 67 (Silas Creek Parkway), forms a partial-controlled access partial loop around the western side of Winston-Salem, with most of the road carrying NC 67 between Peters Creek Parkway to Reynolda Road.
- US 264, Alternate U.S. 264 (Greenville Boulevard), NC 11 Bypass, forms a loop around Greenville, part of which is a freeway.
- NC 54, US 15, and US 501 form a partial-controlled access partial loop around Chapel Hill.
- NC 24/NC 27, US 52, and the North-East Connector form a complete bypass of Albemarle.

==== Ohio ====
- Interstate 270, Columbus – Known in Columbus as "The Outerbelt"
  - In Columbus, Interstate 71, Interstate 70, Interstate 670, and SR 315 form a beltway. It is known locally called "The Innerbelt".
- Interstate 90, Cleveland – The confluence of Interstate 90 and the northern termini of Interstates 71 and 77 bypassing Downtown Cleveland (locally known as the "Innerbelt")
- Interstate 271–Interstate 480, Cleveland – Large segments of these two freeways together form a partial beltway (locally known as the "Outerbelt")
- Interstate 275, Cincinnati
- Interstate 475 (entire length) and Interstate 75 exits 192–204, Toledo
- In the city of Akron, a beltway (albeit rectangular-shaped) is formed by three different Interstates – Interstate 77 travels alone on the eastern part (between exits 122–125), Interstate 76 travels alone on the western part (between exits 18–20), I-76 and I-77 share the northern part (signed as exits 20–23, using I-76 exit numbers), and Interstate 277 forms the entire southern part (4 miles)
- In the city of Chillicothe, a partial beltway is formed by two freeways: US 23 (between exits 41 and 43A), which forms the southern portion of the beltway, and US 35 (between exits 108-112), which forms the northern portion of the beltway. The two routes are concurrent (US 23 exits 43B-46) on the eastern portion of the beltway.

==== Oregon ====
- Interstate 205, Portland
- Interstate 405/Interstate 5 between the Fremont Bridge and the Marquam Bridge, Downtown Portland

==== Pennsylvania ====
- Capital Beltway, includes portions of Interstate 81, Interstate 83, Pennsylvania Route 581, U.S. Route 11, and U.S. Route 322 around Harrisburg
- Lehigh Valley Thruway, including Interstate 78 and Pennsylvania Route 33 provide a beltway for the Lehigh Valley
- Pittsburgh/Allegheny County Belt System, Pittsburgh (set of six color-coded non-highway beltways)
- Interstate 576 (proposed), a proposed toll beltway route around Pittsburgh
- Interstate 70, Interstate 76, and Interstate 79 form a complete beltway around the Pittsburgh metropolitan area
- Interstate 476 and the Interstate 276 section of the Pennsylvania Turnpike provide a bypass of Philadelphia
- Interstate 81 and Interstate 476 around Scranton, Pennsylvania

==== Rhode Island ====
- Interstate 295, Providence
- Downtown Ring Roads, Providence
- Downtown Circulator, Pawtucket

==== South Carolina ====
- Interstate 20, Interstate 26, and Interstate 77 form a complete beltway around Columbia.
- Interstate 520 (Palmetto Parkway/South Carolina), N. Augusta.
- Interstate 526, (Mark Clark Expressway/James Island Expressway), Charleston (unfinished)

==== South Dakota ====
- Interstate 229, Sioux Falls

==== Tennessee ====
- Interstate 40 and Interstate 240, Memphis
- Interstate 269 Memphis Outer Beltway (partially built, remaining portions under construction)
- Interstate 440, Nashville
- Interstate 475, Knoxville Beltway Knoxville (planned)
- Interstate 840, Nashville
- State Route 155 (Briley Parkway), Nashville
- State Route 397 Mack Hatcher Memorial Parkway Franklin

==== Texas ====
Interstate 610 map, Texas

- Interstate 410 (Loop 410), San Antonio
- Loop 1604 (partial beltway on the north), San Antonio
- Interstate 610 (The 610 Loop), Houston
- Beltway 8 (Sam Houston Tollway), Houston
- State Highway 99 (Grand Parkway), Houston (unfinished)
- Interstate 635/Interstate 20 (LBJ), Dallas
- President George Bush Turnpike, Dallas
- State Highway Loop 12, Dallas
- Interstate 820 (Loop 820), Fort Worth
- State Highway 45, Austin (partial beltway around Austin)
- State Highway Loop 224, Nacogdoches
- State Highway Loop 250, Midland
- State Highway Loop 256, Palestine
- State Highway Loop 281, Longview
- State Highway Loop 286, Paris
- State Highway Loop 287, Lufkin
- State Highway Loop 288, Denton
- State Highway Loop 289, Lubbock
- State Highway Loop 304, Crockett
- State Highway Loop 322, Abilene
- State Highway Loop 323, Tyler
- State Highway Loop 335, Amarillo
- State Highway Loop 336, Conroe
- State Highway Loop 337, New Braunfels
- State Highway Loop 338, Odessa
- State Highway Loop 340, Waco
- State Highway Loop 375 (TransMt. Loop), El Paso
- State Highway Loop 485, Gladewater
- Belt Line Road, suburbs around Dallas

==== Utah ====
- Interstate 215 (Belt Route), Salt Lake City

==== Vermont ====
- Interstate 89/Vermont Route 289 (Chittenden County Circumferential Highway)

==== Virginia ====
- Interstate 64/Interstate 664 (Hampton Roads Beltway), Hampton Roads metropolitan area
- Interstate 495 (Capital Beltway), Washington, D.C.
- Interstate 295, partial beltway around Richmond
- State Route 262 (Staunton Beltway) Staunton

==== Washington ====
- Interstate 405, Seattle

==== Wisconsin ====
- In Milwaukee, Interstates 94 (exits 305–316) and 894 (entire route) form a beltway. Unlike most other beltways, it actually traverses the downtown area of the city it serves (see also: Marquette Interchange, and Zoo Interchange).
- West Beltline Highway – U.S. Route 12/U.S. Route 18 (Madison)
- U.S. Route 41/Interstate 41, U.S. Route 10 and State Trunk Highway 441 form a beltway in Appleton.
- Interstates 41, 43, and State Trunk Highway 172 form a beltway in Green Bay.
- Interstate 94, US 18, State Trunk Highway 59, State Trunk Highway 164, and State Trunk Highway 318 form a bypass beltway in Waukesha.

== South America ==
=== Argentina ===
- Avenida General Paz, Buenos Aires
- Avenida de Circunvalacion, Córdoba
- Avenida de Circunvalacion 25 de Mayo, Rosario
- Avenida de Circunvalacion, Santa Fe
- Avenida de Circunvalacion, San Juan

=== Brazil ===
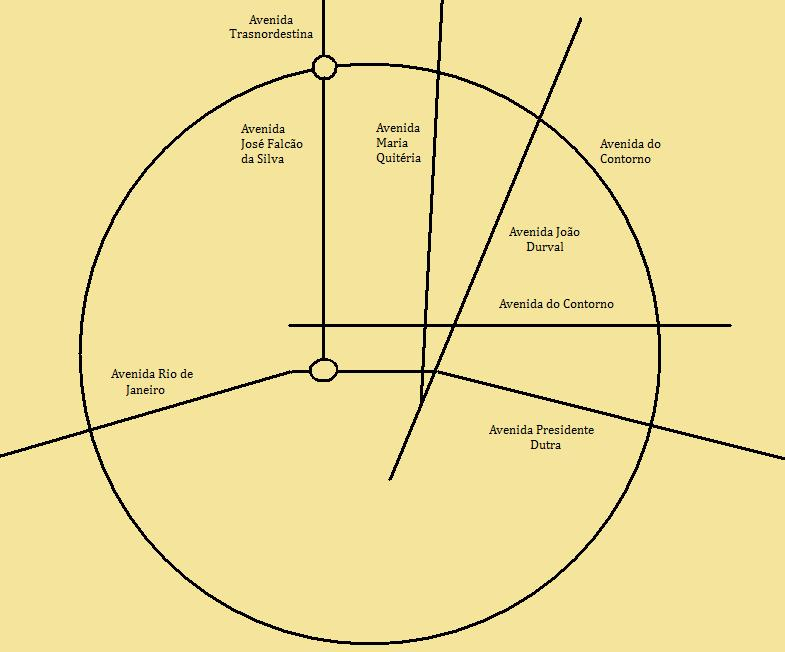
Map of Feira de Santana

- Rodoanel Mário Covas, São Paulo
- Arco Metropolitano do Rio de Janeiro, Rio de Janeiro
- Anel Viário José Magalhães Teixeira, Campinas
- Avenida do Contorno, Feira de Santana
- Anel Viário Norte (SP-328), Ribeirão Preto
- Anel Viário Sul (SP-333), Ribeirão Preto
- Anel Rodoviário (BR-262), Belo Horizonte
- Contorno Oeste, Boa Vista

=== Chile ===
- Américo Vespucio Avenue, Santiago

== See also ==
List of longest ring roads
