= Inner Ring Road =

Inner Ring Road may refer to:

== Roads ==
=== China ===
- Inner Ring Road (Shanghai)
- Inner Ring Road (Tianjin)
- Inner Ring Road, Guangzhou

=== Germany ===
- Inner Ring Road, Berlin
- Inner City Ring Road (Leipzig)

=== Greece ===
- Thessaloniki Inner Ring Road

=== India ===
- Inner Ring Road, Bangalore
- Inner Ring Road, Chennai
- Inner Ring Road, Delhi
- Inner Ring Road, Guntur
- Inner Ring Road, Hyderabad
- Inner Ring Road, Ranchi
- Inner Ring Road, Vijayawada

=== Indonesia ===
- Jakarta Inner Ring Road

=== United Kingdom ===
- Glasgow Inner Ring Road
- Inner Ring Road, London
- Leeds Inner Ring Road
- Manchester Inner Ring Road
- Sheffield Inner Ring Road

=== Malaysia ===
- George Town Inner Ring Road
- Johor Bahru Inner Ring Road
- Kluang Inner Ring Road
- Kuala Lumpur Inner Ring Road
- Segamat Inner Ring Road
- Seremban Inner Ring Road
