= IRR =

IRR or Irr may refer to:

== Finance ==
- Implied repo rate, in the futures market
- Internal rate of return, a profitability metric
- Iranian rial, currency of Iran by ISO 4217 code
- Interest rate risk, financial risk from fluctuating interest rates

== Organisations ==
- Incident Response Regiment (Australia), an emergency response agency
- Institute of Race Relations, a policy institute
- Institute for Religious Research, an apologetics organization
- Iraqi Republic Railways, a transportation operator
- South African Institute of Race Relations, a think tank

== Science and technology ==
- Image rejection ratio, a radio metric
- Interrupt Request Register, a register used for managing interrupts in programmable interrupt controllers
- Internet Routing Registry, a network routing database
- Irregular galaxy, a galaxy that does not have a distinct regular shape

== Other ==
- Incidence rate ratio, a statistic derived from a Poisson regression model
- Individual Ready Reserve, a personnel status of the United States Military
- Infusion-related reaction or infusion reaction, a form of systemic inflammatory response syndrome caused by some diseases and drugs
- Inner Ring Road (disambiguation)
- Inter-rater reliability
