= Tampa Bay Crosstown Expressway System =

The Lee Roy Selmon Expressway originated from an expressway system called the Tampa Bay Crosstown Expressway System. The expressways were planned during the 1950s, '60s and '70s. However, the system fizzled out due to financial burdens, land acquisition issues, and community concerns.

== The South Crosstown Expressway ==
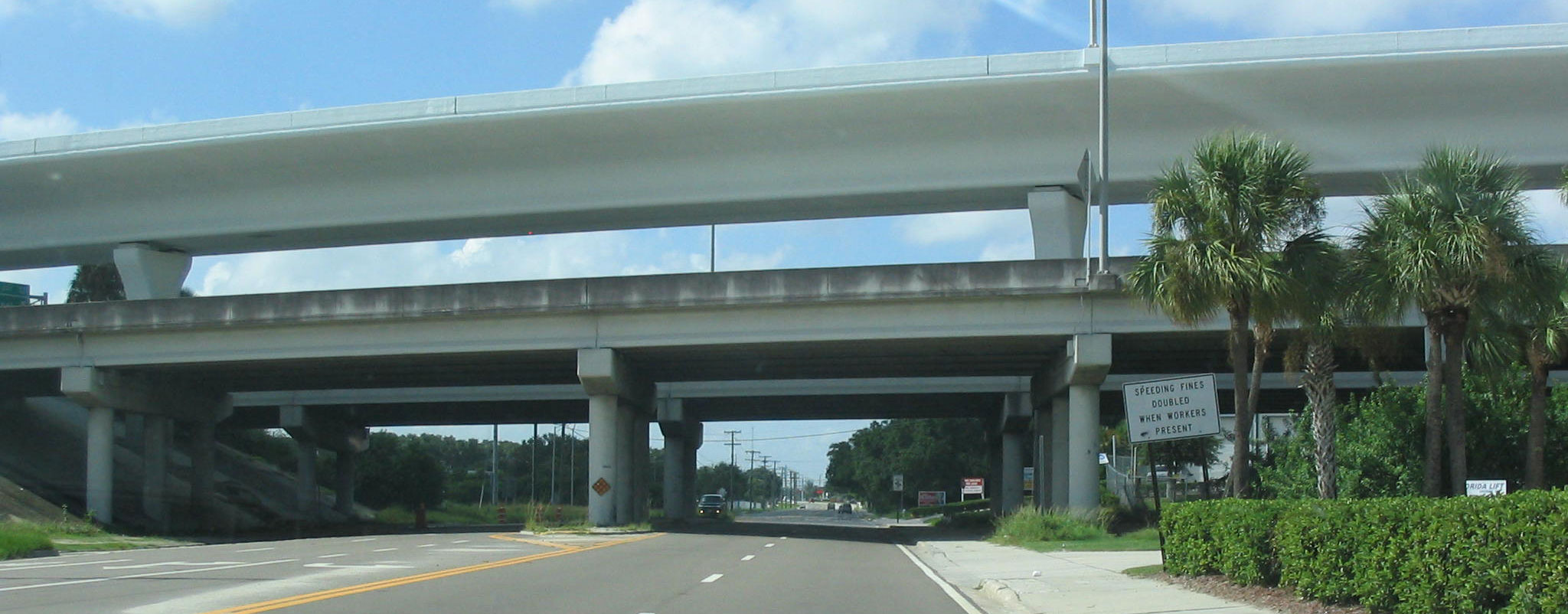
The Lee Roy Selmon Expressway including the Reversible Express Lanes at 78th Street.

What is known today as the Lee Roy Selmon Expressway was originally called the "South Crosstown Expressway", and was originally designated as State Road 449. The original name can be seen on many older maps and atlases.

Original designs had the expressway north of its present route, beginning around Bay-to-Bay Boulevard and following a CSX rail line to Cass Street, and then cutting through central downtown, and ending around 50th Street. In addition, there were plans to connect what is today Ashley Drive to the expressway. However, this plan was changed, most likely due to the development in downtown. Instead, the route was shifted south, taking the expressway through southern downtown.

Construction commenced on the South Crosstown Expressway in 1974, beginning around Gandy Boulevard at Dale Mabry Hwy and traveling along a CSX rail corridor through Palma Ceia. The route then made an eastward turn at Platt Street/Willow Avenue as it snaked its way through historic Hyde Park. Construction ended with a 3/4 mile-long, six-lane viaduct that spanned the Hillsborough River in the southern portion of downtown and stopped at Florida Avenue (Exit 6A). Stub ramps at the expressway's east end were built for easy extension of the route. The initial six miles (10 km) of the South Crosstown Expressway opened in 1976.

Construction commenced on an extension in 1979 due to the immense population growth in Brandon and the heavily congested State Road 60 (Adamo Drive). The extension opened in 1981 and extended the downtown viaduct through the southern vicinity of Ybor City. The route continued through the Palm River area, closely parallel to State Road 60 for much of the extension's route, and terminated at a partial interchange with Faulkenburg Road (Exit 14).

Construction of I-75 from Lutz to Hialeah in the late 1980s connected a trumpet interchange with the expressway.

=== Logos ===
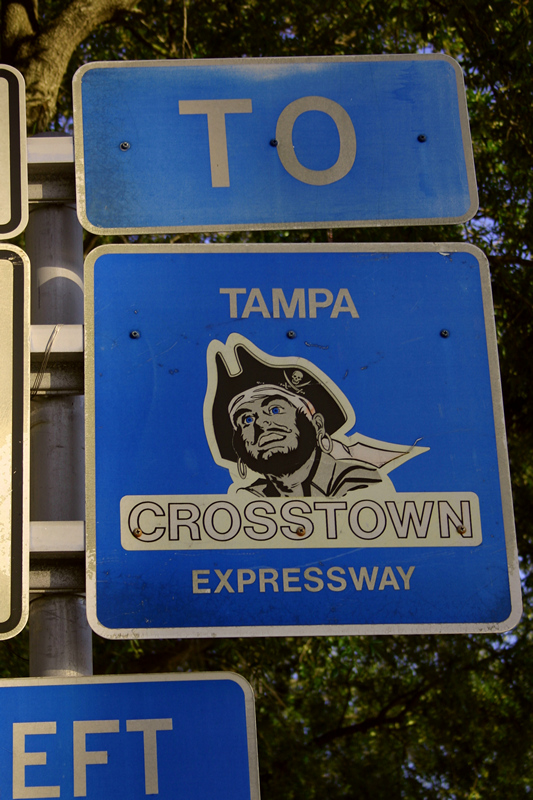
The Jose Gaspar-inspired shield.

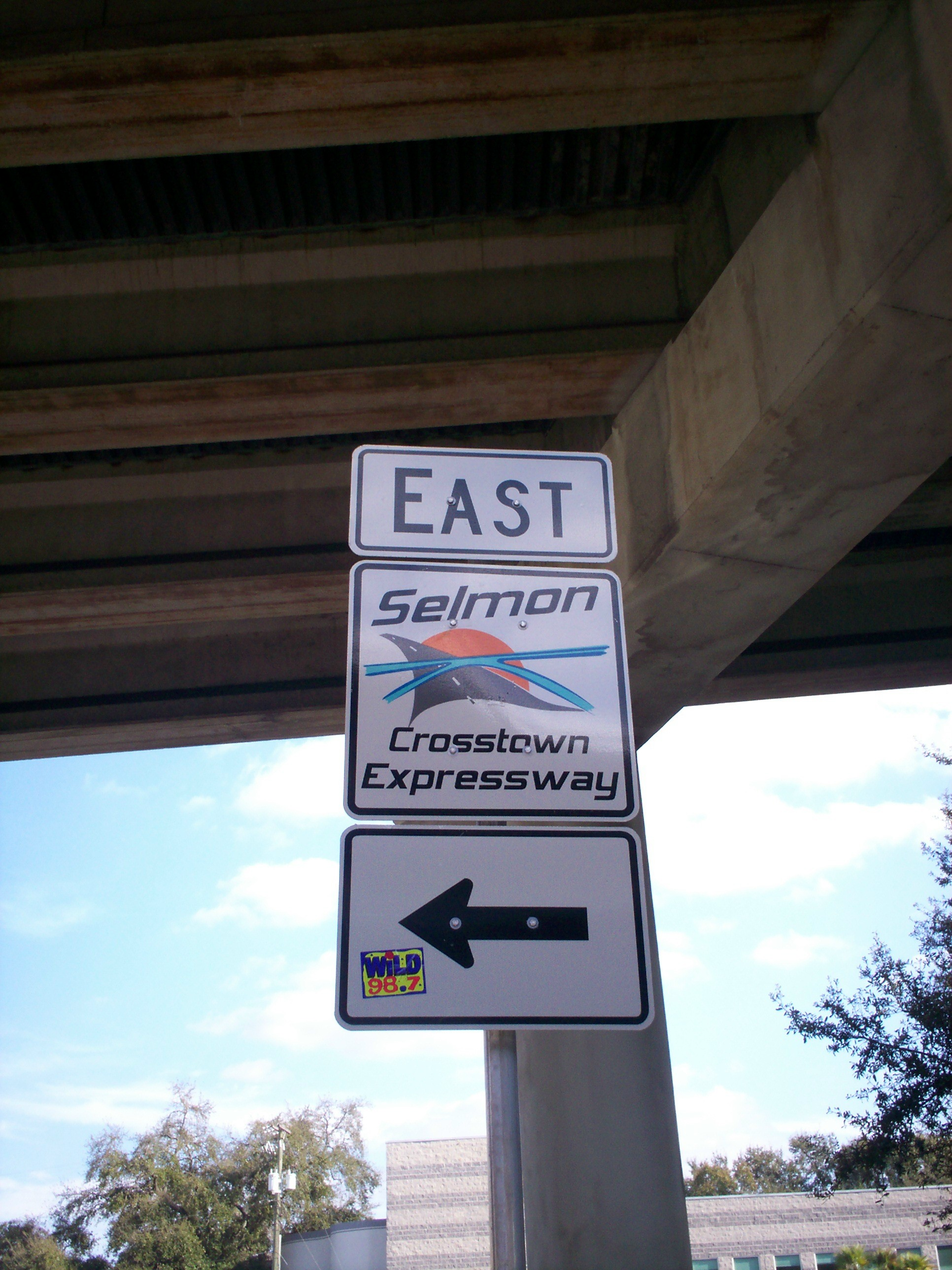
An interim THCEA shield.

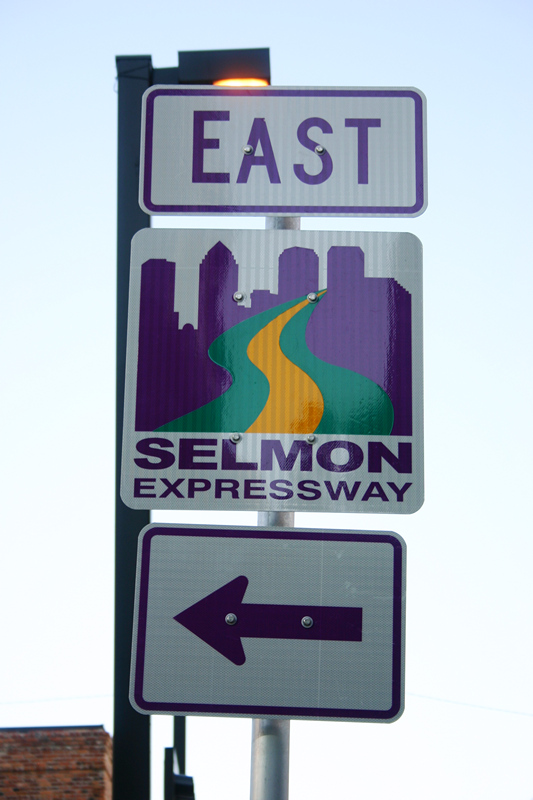
The current Lee Roy Selmon Expressway shield.

The logos for the Expressway have changed between the late 1970s and the early 2000s. Prior to 1978, the logo was a white "X" inside a white circle on a green field that boasted the heading, "TAMPA CROSSTOWN". This logo was eventually phased out by the late 1980s.

In the late 1970s, a contest was held to see which logo would be best for the expressway's image. Eventually a blue shield design with the image of pirate Jose Gaspar and the title, "TAMPA CROSSTOWN EXPRESSWAY", came out on top. These signs replaced the South Crosstown Expressway signs by the late 80s.

In 2002, the Tampa Hillsborough Expressway Authority opened the reversible express lanes and designed a more modern logo. The shield contains a white background with a bridge on the foreground. The title was changed to "Selmon Crosstown Expressway".

On July 29, 2008, THEA unveiled a new, permanent logo that will eventually replace all previous logos along the expressway. This logo features the downtown Tampa skyline in purple with the expressway winding into it. The title below the graphic reads "SELMON EXPRESSWAY".

== The West Crosstown Expressway ==
What was planned as the "West Crosstown Expressway" was designated as State Road 589 and would have connected the exit at Willow Ave (Exit 4) to the current Veterans Expressway interchange with I-275 and State Road 60 (Kennedy Boulevard). Public opposition thwarted the connection and as a result, the designation of State Road 449 was changed to State Road 618.

== The North Crosstown Expressway ==
Little is known about this leg of the Crosstown System. However, it would have run from State Road 60 in Brandon to the Courtney Campbell Causeway, straddling Hillsborough Ave for a portion of the route. The plan was killed in the 1960s and 1970s due to high land acquisition costs, including environmentally sensitive land east of the Veterans Expressway.

The North Crosstown Expressway plan resurfaced in 2002/2003 as part of THEA's master plan, which includes the proposed Tampa Bay Area Beltway, and was planned to connect US 301/I-75 to the Veterans Expressway. However, the proposed route would have been much shorter than its predecessor and would have straddled the Busch/Waters corridor rather than the MLK/Hillsborough corridor. This idea was dropped in 2007.

== Other connectors ==
FDOT and THEA have previously proposed several other connectors for the Selmon Expressway in the past, all of which have failed due to financial burdens and community concerns.

=== Gandy Extension ===
A proposed link between the Selmon Expressway's current south terminus at Gandy Blvd and Dale Mabry Hwy and the Gandy Bridge has been the subject of fierce controversy ever since the expressway's inception. The connection to the bridge was in the original design for the Expressway, but was taken out after community and elected official's objection. Extending the expressway would relieve congestion on now overcrowded Gandy Blvd, as well as allow an additional dedicated evacuation route for Pinellas residents, which would leave Gandy Blvd available for South Tampa residents. However, local residents and business owners have continually struck down the idea, claiming that the thoroughfare will cause decreased property values and increased noise, destroy the ambiance of Gandy Blvd, and keep customers away from local businesses.

Three different concepts have been proposed over the years, as described below:

==== North Connector ====
This alignment called for an elevated four lane structure on the north side of Gandy Boulevard, connecting the Selmon Expressway and Dale Mabry Hwy to the Gandy Bridge. Interchanges at Manhattan and WestShore would have been built as well. However, this would have also meant that 37 businesses would have been wiped out, sparking fierce opposition among the Gandy community. Since the early 2000s, there have been no plans to bring this alignment back to the forefront.

==== South Connector ====
This alignment is similar in nature to the North Connector. However its routing is different; extending the Selmon along the CSX rail corridor that flanks Tyson Ave. This alignment would have called for much of the extension to be elevated due to the nature of the surrounding environment. Interchanges at Manhattan and WestShore would have been built as well. But with the North Connector, the South Connector also faced fierce opposition from the Gandy community. In addition, FDOT declared in the early 2000s that the project would not be financially feasible due to high construction and land acquisition costs. In 2005, developers of the Legacy Park condo complex bought up a tract of land between Manhattan and WestShore, on the south side of the CSX rail line. This same tract of land would have been necessary for the South Connector to be constructed. When another crucial area of land (the former Imperial Yacht basin) was bought up by condo developers (New Port) in 2005, the South Connector plan was basically killed off. There have been no intentions to bring this plan to the forefront either as of 2006.

==== Central Connector/Elevated Gandy Blvd ====
This alignment is the last viable option for a Selmon Expressway extension towards the Gandy Bridge. This plan would call for a two-lane elevated span through the median of Gandy Blvd. The design would be similar to the Reversible Express Lanes that were constructed east of downtown. However, some in the Gandy community continue to rally against this plan. In 2008, the FDOT improved Gandy Blvd itself by raising the median, limiting/modifying turn points/lanes, and upgrading traffic signals.

A component connector to the Gandy proposal was rumored to connect the failed Gandy extension to Interstate 375 in St. Pete. However, the plan proved to be unpractical.

Some information used in this section came from this Tampa Tribune article.

=== East Extension ===
At the eastern terminus, there was also a proposal to extend the Expressway beyond Interstate 75 to the Polk Parkway and eventually towards the east coast of Florida, replacing SR 60 as a primary east-west route. This extension was killed off by several community revolts in the 1960s and 1970s.

== Related links ==
Jose Gaspar Crosstown Logo As mentioned above, this shield was implemented in the 1970s and still can be seen along the expressway today, even though it is slowly being replaced.

The new Selmon Expressway logo, unveiled on July 29, 2008, that will replace all previous signage along the expressway.
