= Vahid Bridge =

Bridge in Isfahan, Iran

Vahid Bridge Persian: پل فلزی
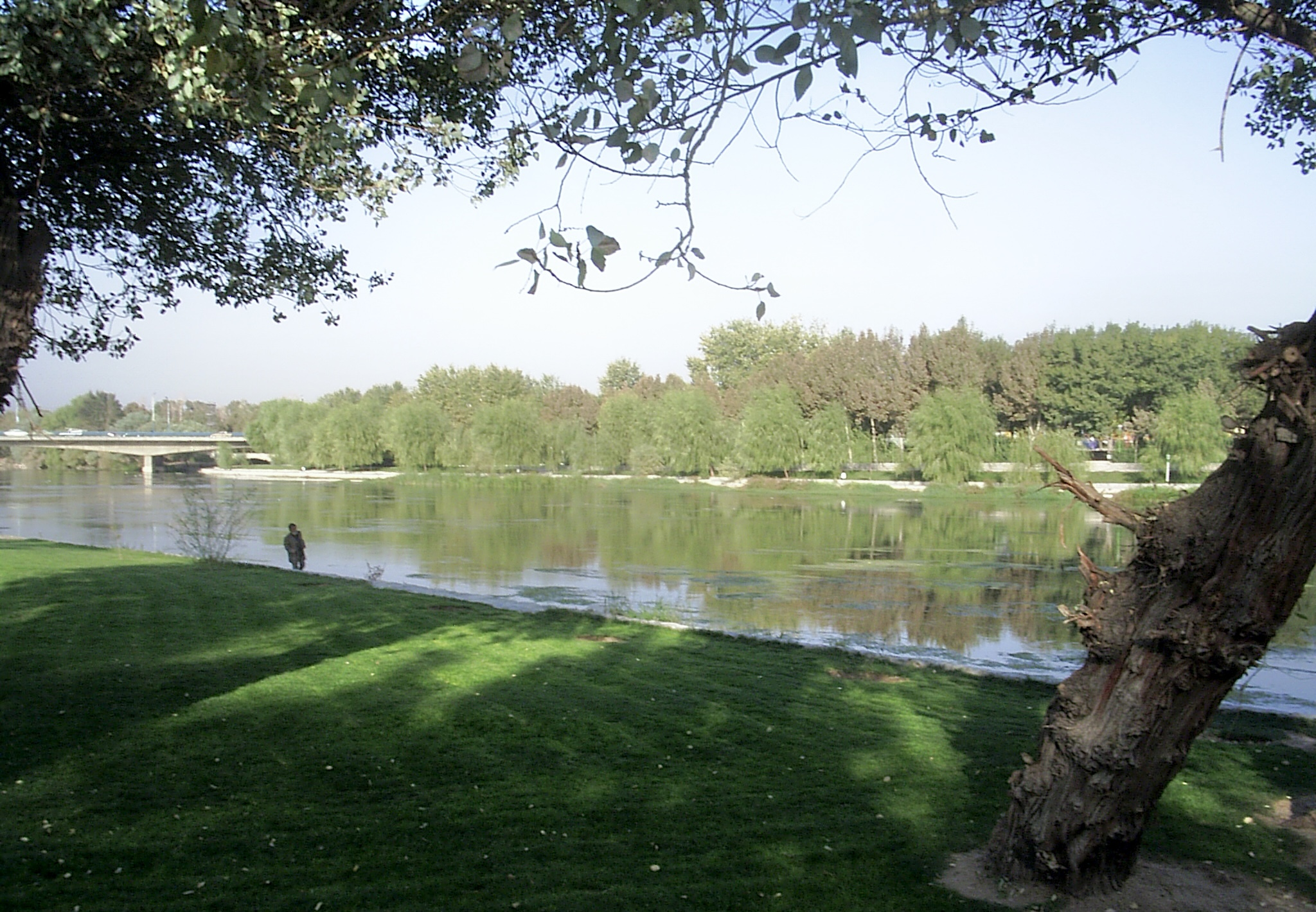
- Vahid Bridge over the Zayandeh River in Esfahan.
- Coordinates: 32°38′25″N 51°38′25″E
- Crosses: Zayanderud
- Locale: Isfahan, Iran

History
- Construction end: 1976

Location
- Interactive map of Vahid Bridge

Vahid Bridge (Persian: پل وحید, romanized: Pol-e Vahid) is a cantilevered, steel and concrete bridge over the Zayandeh River in the city of Esfahan. It was completed in 1976 and is the westernmost of the eleven bridges over the Zayandeh in Esfahan.

== Transportation ==
- Khayyam Expressway
- Mirza Kouchak Khan Expressway

== See also ==
- Bridges over the Zayandeh River
