= Habibollahi Expressway =

Shahid Habibollahi Expressway
- بزرگراه شهيد حبيب اللهي
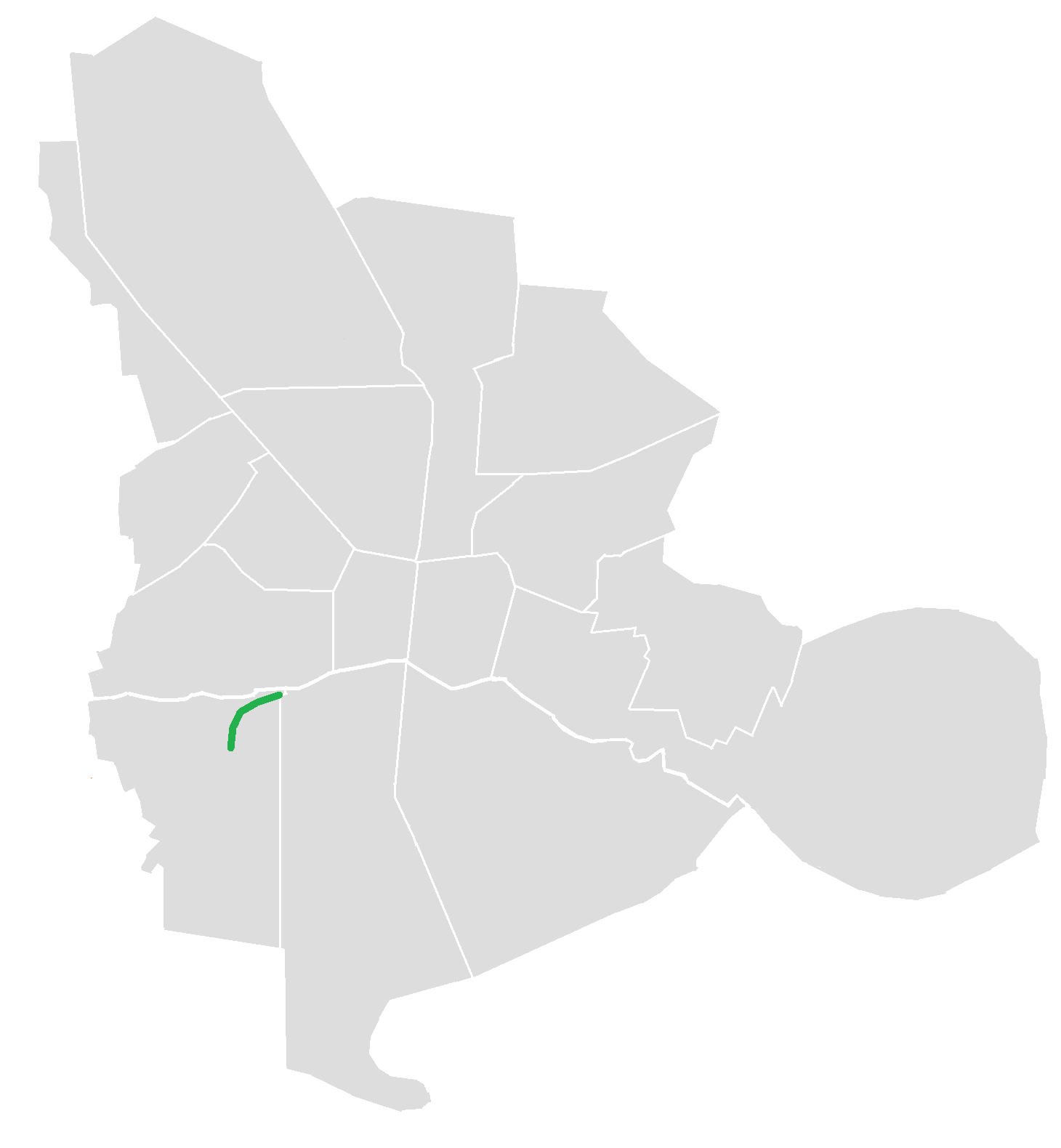

Route information
- Length: 1.5 km (0.93 mi)

Major junctions
- North end: Mirza Kouchak Khan Expressway; Janbazan Street; Najvan Park
- South end: Shahid Meysami Expressway; Kazemi Boulevard; Keshavarz Boulevard

Location
- Country: Iran
- Major cities: Esfahan

Highway system
- Highways in Iran; Freeways

Habibollahi Expressway is an expressway in Iran. It is located in western Isfahan connecting Mirza Kouchak Khan Expressway and Shahid Meysami Expressway.

From East to West
Continues as: Mirza Kouchak Khan Expressway
Janbazan Street; Najvan Park
Kazemi Boulevard; Keshavarz Boulevard
Continues as: Shahid Meysami Expressway
From North to South
