= Massachusetts Route 213 =

State highway in Essex County, Massachusetts, US

Route 213
- Loop Connector; Albert Slack Memorial Highway
- Route 213 highlighted in red

Route information
- Maintained by MassDOT
- Length: 3.56 mi (5.73 km)
- Existed: 1964–present

Major junctions
- West end: I-93 in Methuen
- Route 28 in Methuen; Route 113 in Methuen
- East end: I-495 in Methuen

Location
- Country: United States
- State: Massachusetts
- Counties: Essex

Highway system
- Massachusetts State Highway System; Interstate; US; State
← Route 204	→ Route 220

Route 213 is a 3.56-mile-long (5.73 km) freeway in Massachusetts. It connects Interstate 93 (I-93) with I-495 in Methuen, Massachusetts, just south of the New Hampshire border. The highway is a northern bypass of Route 113, which serves the downtown area, and derives its own number from it.

There is a nearby shopping center known as The Loop, so called because of the designation of Route 213 as the 'Loop Connector'.

According to MassDOT, Route 213 carries approximately 45,000 vehicles per day.

== Route description ==
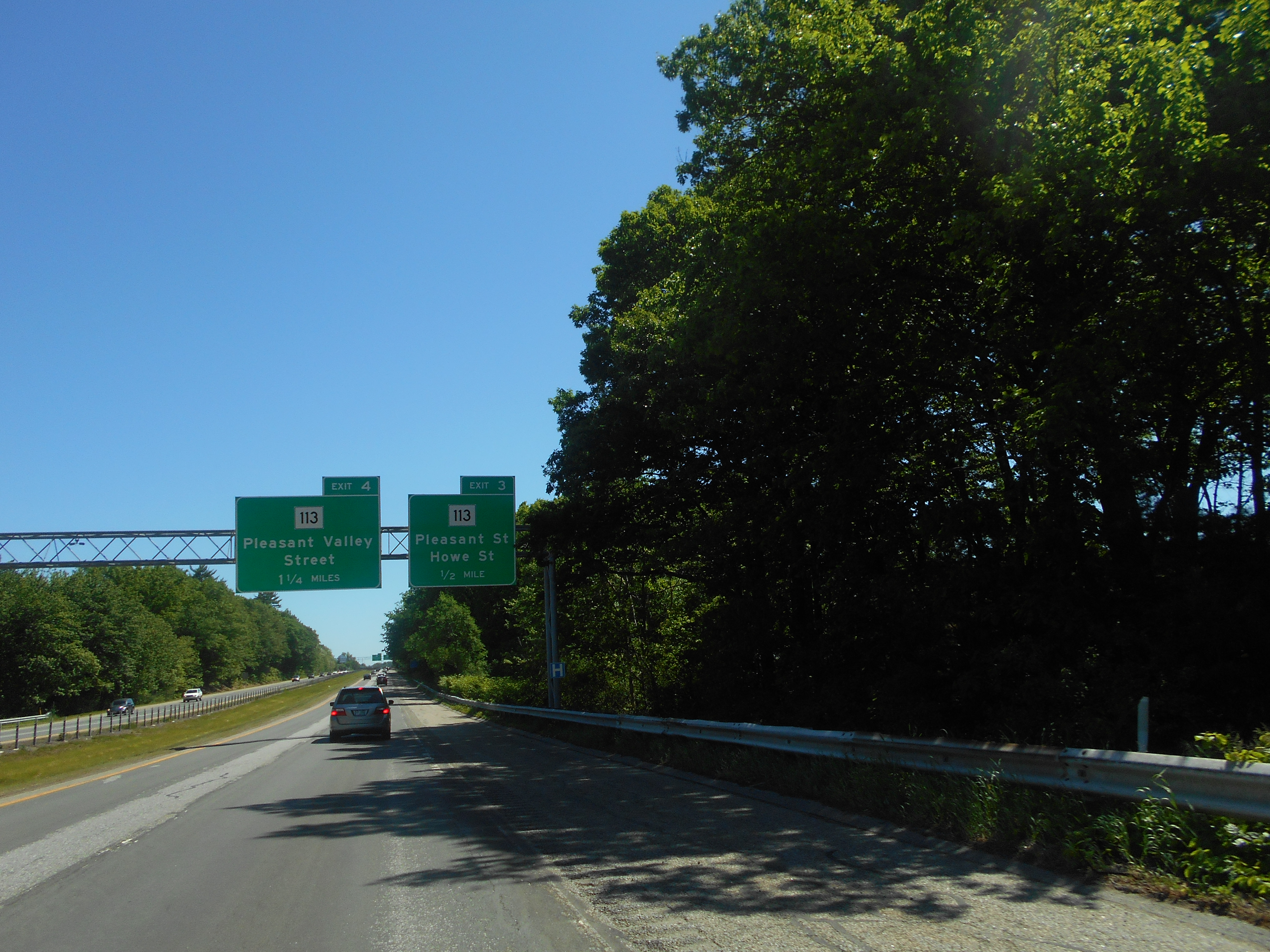
Route 213 approaching exit 3 in Methuen

Route 213 begins in the west as an offshoot of I-93 at its northernmost exit in Massachusetts, Exit 46 (old exit 48), just south of the New Hampshire state line. It begins by traveling to the east for less than 1/2 mile (0.80 km) before meeting Route 28 (Broadway) at Exit 2.

Route 28 southbound provides access to the downtown area which Route 213 bypasses (it is a northern bypass of Route 113, which cuts west-to-east through the city). Route 28 northbound parallels I-93, crossing into Salem, New Hampshire and becoming New Hampshire Route 28 after approximately 1/2 mile (0.80 km).

Route 213 continues eastward for about another mile before interchanging with Route 113 (Pleasant Street), with access between Route 113 and westbound Route 213 facilitated by nearby Howe Street. Another half mile or so to the east, Route 213 interchanges with Route 113 again, via a short connecting road to Exit 4. This exit provides nearby access to The Loop. Route 213 continues a short distance to the east, crossing underneath Route 113 before ending at an interchange with I-495.

== History ==
The road was initially planned to start in Lowell at US-3 at a point between exits 81C and 84 (old exits 31 and 32). From there, it was to have run north, crossing the Merrimack River roughly at the site of the current Rourke Bridge. It would then continue north through a portion of the Lowell-Dracut State Forest before turning east, crossing I-93 in Methuen and ending at I-495. However, environmental regulations, a growing opposition in both Lowell and Dracut, and a projected insufficient demand for the road caused the state to permanently kill the portion of the highway between US-3 and I-93.

The expressway (which at this time was known as "Relocated Route 113") between I-93 and the current Exit 3 interchange was completed on September 11, 1962, when it was ceremonially named the Albert Slack Memorial Highway. The eastward extension to I-495 was completed in 1964, and Massachusetts Department of Public Works officially designated the road as Route 213. State officials unsuccessfully submitted for inclusion of Route 213 in the Interstate Highway System in 1970, in an attempt to gain federal funding for the project. The submission was rejected by the Federal Highway Administration.

Route 213 was officially designated as the Loop Connector in October 2000 by the Massachusetts legislature.

== Exit list ==
Interchanges along Route 213 were to be renumbered to mileage-based numbers under a project scheduled to start in 2016. However, this project was indefinitely postponed by MassDOT. On November 18, 2019, MassDOT announced that Route 213's exit numbers would not be changed because its exits were so tightly spaced.

The entire route is in Methuen, Essex County.

mi	km	Exit	Destinations	Notes
0.00	0.00	1	I-93 – Boston, Concord, NH	Western terminus; signed as exits 1A (north) and 1B (south); exit 46 on I-93; semi-directional T interchange
0.82	1.32	2	Route 28 (Broadway) – Methuen, Salem, NH	Partial cloverleaf interchange
2.15	3.46	3	Route 113 (Pleasant Street) / Howe Street – Methuen, Salem, NH	Partial cloverleaf interchange
2.82	4.54	4	Route 113 (Pleasant Valley Street) – Haverhill, The Loop	Trumpet interchange
3.56	5.73	5	I-495 – Salisbury, Lowell	Eastern terminus; signed as exits 5A (north) and 5B (south); exit 105 on I-495; trumpet interchange
1.000 mi = 1.609 km; 1.000 km = 0.621 mi
