= Mirza Kouchak Khan Expressway =

Road in Iran

Mirza Kuchak Khan Expressway
- بزرگراه میرزا کوچک خان
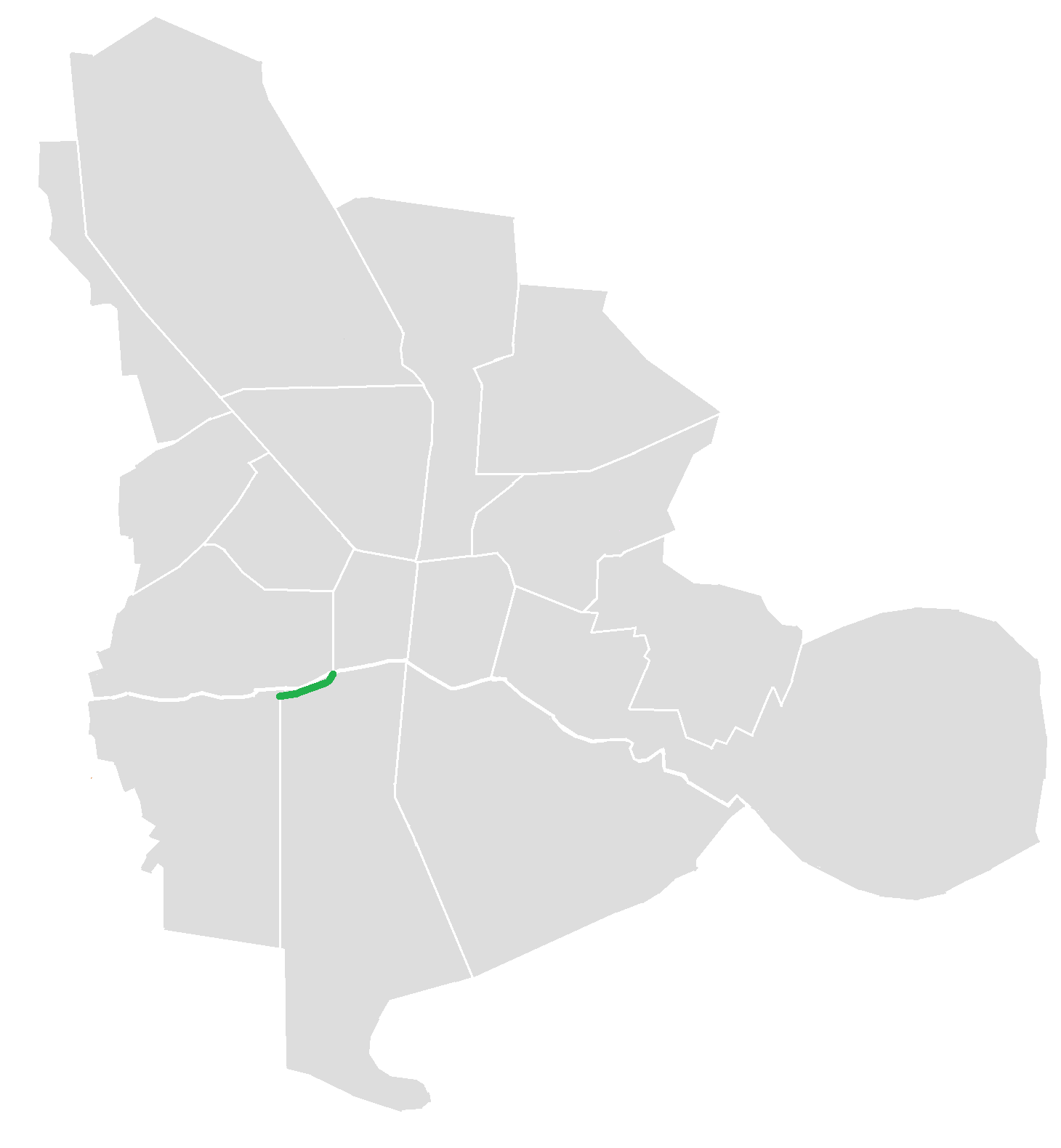

Route information
- Length: 1.5 km (0.93 mi)

Major junctions
- North end: Vahid Bridge
- South end: Habibollahi Expressway; Janbazan Street; Najvan Park

Location
- Country: Iran
- Major cities: Esfahan

Highway system
- Highways in Iran; Freeways

Mirza Kuchak Khan Expressway is an expressway in western Esfahan, Iran.

From East to West
Continues as: Khayyam Expressway
Vahid Bridge
Vahid Street; Saadi Street
Janbazan Street; Najvan Park
Continues as: Habibollahi Expressway
From North to South
