= The Loop (shopping center) =

Shopping mall in Methuen, Massachusetts

Coordinates: 42°44′36″N 71°9′36″W

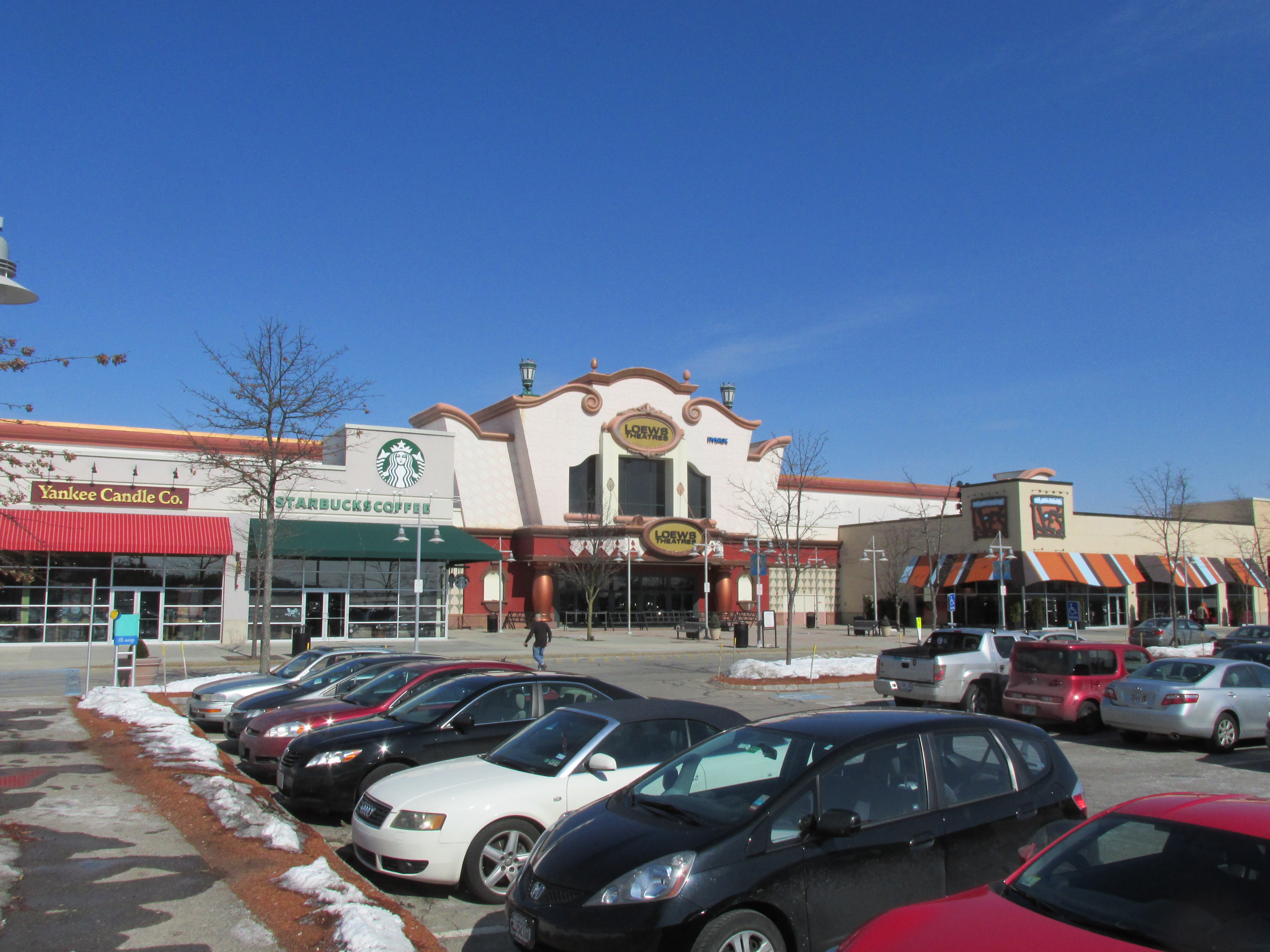
- Location: Methuen, Massachusetts, U.S.
- Opened: September 4, 1973 (Methuen Mall); 1999 (The Loop)
- Closed: 1997 (Methuen Mall)
- Previous names: Methuen Mall
- Developer: First Hartford Realty
- Owner: Charter Realty
- Num. of stores: 70+ (Methuen Mall); 27(The Loop)
- Num. of anchor tenants: 2 (Methuen Mall); 4 (The Loop)
- Floor area: 500,406 square feet (46,489.2 m^{2}) (Methuen Mall)304,000 square feet (28,200 m^{2}) (The Loop)
- Floors: 1

The Loop is a shopping mall in Methuen, Massachusetts, United States. It was redeveloped from Methuen Mall, which opened in 1973 as an enclosed shopping mall on a 60-acre (240,000 m^{2}) site and initially included Howlands and Sears as its anchor stores, as well as 70 other retailers. In 1977, Howlands was replaced by Jordan Marsh, while Filene's Basement was added in the 1980s. Methuen Mall suffered a significant loss in tenancy after both Sears and Filene's Basement moved to The Mall at Rockingham Park across the state line in Salem, New Hampshire. It remained in operation until 1997 and was demolished in early 1999, undergoing redevelopment in 2000 into The Loop. Major tenants of The Loop are The Home Depot, Marshalls, and AMC Theatres.

== History ==
In July 1972, Manchester, Connecticut–based First Hartford Realty announced construction of Methuen Mall. The site chosen for the mall was on Massachusetts Route 213 between Interstate 93 and Interstate 495, on a 22-acre (8.9 ha) plot of land which was previously a portion of the Mann family apple orchard. At the time of development, First Hartford Realty had confirmed that the mall would cost about $14 million to build, and would include Sears and White Plains, New York–based Howlands department store as the anchor stores. The original plans for the Methuen Mall were to have Sears and Sutherlands as its anchors. However, Sutherlands, a department store based in nearby downtown Lawrence, chose to expand its Essex Street store and open a second store in Andover instead, Both stores would close a few years later. By January 1973, mall developers had confirmed that Sears would open by September, with the rest of the mall following soon afterward. The 137,000-square-foot (12,700 m^{2}) store included more than fifty departments for merchandise, as well as a 23,000-square-foot (2,100 m^{2}) automotive repair center in the parking lot. Howlands, whose store was the largest in the chain, opened on September 17 in the spot intended for Sutherlands. The rest of the mall then opened on November 5. In 1977, Howlands closed and was replaced by Jordan Marsh.

In 1982, Filene's Basement opened a 25,000-square-foot (2,300 m^{2}) store as the mall's third anchor. Sold to JMB Realty after development, the mall was sold again to MetLife in 1984 along with a Caldor-anchored strip mall adjacent to Methuen Mall, and Auburn Mall in Auburn, Massachusetts.

=== 1990s ===
In 1990, New England Development announced the development of The Mall at Rockingham Park across the state line in Salem, New Hampshire. Shortly before the opening of the Rockingham Park mall, the Methuen Mall had a vacancy rate of four percent. The building of the Rockingham Park mall posed major challenges for the Methuen Mall, due in part to New Hampshire's lack of sales tax. As the Rockingham Park mall would also contain a Sears among its anchor stores, MetLife representatives stated that they were unsure if Sears would shutter its Methuen store upon opening of the Salem location, but also felt that they would be able to secure a new tenant should the Sears close. By 1992, both Sears and Filene's Basement had moved to Mall at Rockingham Park.

Ann & Hope moved into the former Sears location in 1993. This store closed in 1995 along with Jordan Marsh, leaving the mall without an anchor. As of 1996, the mall had lost more than a quarter of its 65 tenants. When the only nearby convention center closed, the mall attempted a novel strategy to attract customers, opening an expo center in the former Ann & Hope. The center's first event was an all-night rave.

Nonetheless, business continued to diminish at the mall until the only remaining tenant was an Applebee's restaurant. When new developers attempted to evict the Applebee's, it refused. The developers then demolished the rest of the mall around the restaurant. Eventually, it lost a long court battle and vacated the property.

=== Demolition and redevelopment ===
When the Methuen Mall finally closed, the city of Methuen took a huge financial hit, seeing property tax revenue fall from US$60 million annually to US$18 million annually for the site alone. In 2000, the land was redeveloped by a joint venture between The Brickstone Companies and The Wilder Companies of Boston into a new project called The Loop. The new, non-enclosed shopping center has no real anchor stores, but contains a Home Depot, AMC Theatres, and Marshalls, as well as about twenty smaller businesses.

The Stop & Shop at the Loop closed in February 2020.

The Loop is owned and managed by Charter Realty.
