= Lafayette Regional Xpressway =

- LRX highlighted in red

Route information
- Status: Planning stage

Major junctions
- Beltway around Lafayette

Location
- Country: United States
- State: Louisiana

Highway system
- Louisiana State Highway System; Interstate; US; State; Scenic

The Lafayette Regional Xpressway (LRX) is a planned controlled-access toll road in Lafayette Parish, Louisiana. The LRX has also been termed the Lafayette Loop. It will provide an alternative highway for north–south traffic bypassing the City of Lafayette's urban core. The expressway is being planned by the Lafayette Metropolitan Expressway Commission. The LRX will connect I-49 north of Lafayette near the city of Carencro, Louisiana, I-10 west of Lafayette near the cities of Scott, Louisiana and Duson, Louisiana, and U.S. 90 south of the city of Lafayette near the city of Youngsville, Louisiana. The proposed roadway will initially be four lanes, but will be designed to accommodate future expansion to six lanes. The final LRX length will be between 27 and 36 miles (43 and 58 km) in length. Construction may follow a phased approach with the roadway south of I-10 given first priority.

Following a draft issued in December 2018, a combined LRX Tier 1 Final Environmental Impact Statement and Record of Decision was issued by the Louisiana Department of Transportation and Development in December 2022 and signed by the Federal Highway Administration in February 2023. The ROD concluded that the no-build alternative "does not meet the purpose and need of the project as it does not provide the north-south capacity increase through the region." Preliminary cost estimates were prepared as a part of the Tier 1 EIS. Estimated costs in 2017 dollars for a potential alignment within a southern corridor alternative range between $383,000,000 and $496,000,000, and between $268,000,000 and $435,000,000 for a northern corridor alternative.

== History ==
Louisiana Act 893, the "Lafayette Metropolitan Expressway Commission Act," was enacted by the Louisiana State Legislature in 2003. This act created the Lafayette Metropolitan Expressway Commission (LMEC), and grants it the powers to promote, plan, finance, develop, construct, control, regulate, operate, and maintain any limited access tollway or transitway to be constructed within Lafayette Parish. Act 893 gives the LMEC specific authority to pursue nontraditional funding sources, including toll road alternatives. The LMEC may also pursue Public–private partnerships. The LMEC first met in late 2003, and in 2004 the LMEC initiated a transportation improvement project titled the Lafayette Metropolitan Expressway which was later renamed the Lafayette Regional Xpressway (LRX). Planning and public outreach for the bypass was paused beginning around 2011 and resumed in 2016 so as not to compete for the public's attention with the proposed Lafayette Interstate 49 Connector which would be a six-lane interstate routed through the City of Lafayette.

As with many large transportation projects, development of the LRX environmental impact statement is utilizing a tiered process to study project impacts. Tier 1 examined five corridor alternatives. At the end of the tier 1, a preferred LRX corridor was selected and documented in a record of decision. During the more detailed Tier 2 review, LRX alignments within the preferred corridor will be considered.

The LMEC hosted informal open-house meetings in June 2017 and in February 2019 to involve the public in the LRX project review process. The LMEC reported that it was studying potential corridor alternatives for the Lafayette Regional Xpressway (LRX), which was described as "a proposed loop facility around the Lafayette region to lessen the burden on local arterial roads and streets." The 2019 meeting provided project details on the preferred corridor alternative.

After lying dormant for seven years, the LRX was revived in 2026 once SpaceX announced plans for a massive rocket manufacturing and launch facility named Starbase Louisiana at Pecan Island in neighboring Vermilion Parish. Lafayette is the nearest major city to the site, so development officials expect accelerated population growth in the parts of southern and western Lafayette Parish that the LRX would serve. New legislation expanded the commission's authority to allow it to build roads in Vermilion and Iberia parishes. Some parish leaders have advocated pushing the path of the LRX farther away from the Lafayette core, bringing it closer to the Starbase site.

== Proposed routing ==
Several alternative corridors were considered for the LRX during the Tier 1 study. A project corridor has now been selected.
