= Moscow Big Ring Road =

Ring road in Russia

Federal Highway A108
- Федеральная автомобильная дорога А108
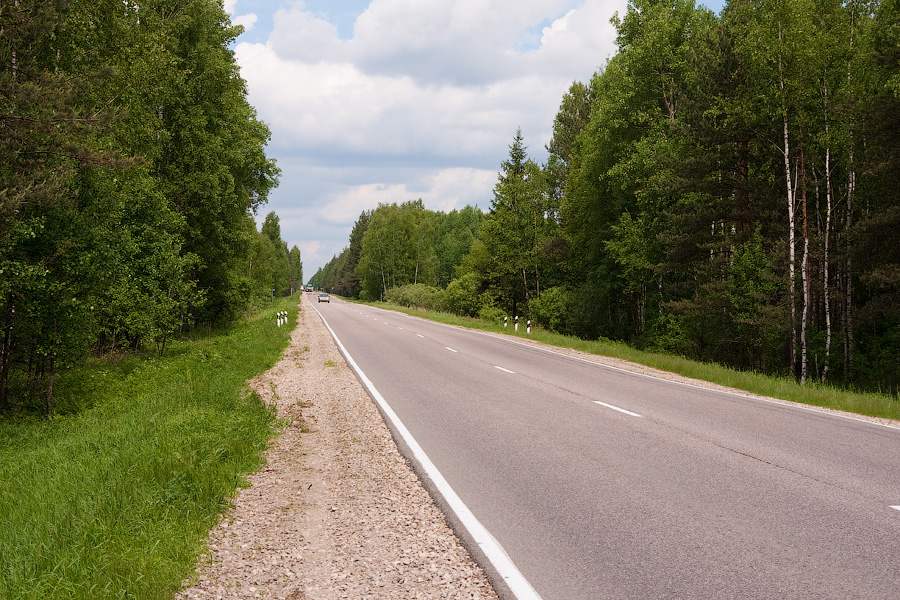

Route information
- Length: 547 km (340 mi)

Location
- Country: Russia

Highway system
- Russian Federal Highways
← A 107	→ A 109

The Moscow Big Ring Road (Russian: Московское большое кольцо), coloqually known as Betonka (Russian: Бетонка) designated as A108, is a Russian federal highway with a length of 547 km (340 mi).

It is located in the Moscow, Kaluga and Vladimir Oblasts, passing through the cities of Orekhovo-Zuyevo, Likino-Dulyovo, Kurovskoye, Voskresensk, Balabanovo, Ruza, Klin and Dmitrov. The highway forms a large transport circle, in the center of which is Moscow.
