= Moscow Small Ring Road =

Ring road in Russia

Federal Highway A107
- Федеральная автомобильная дорога А107
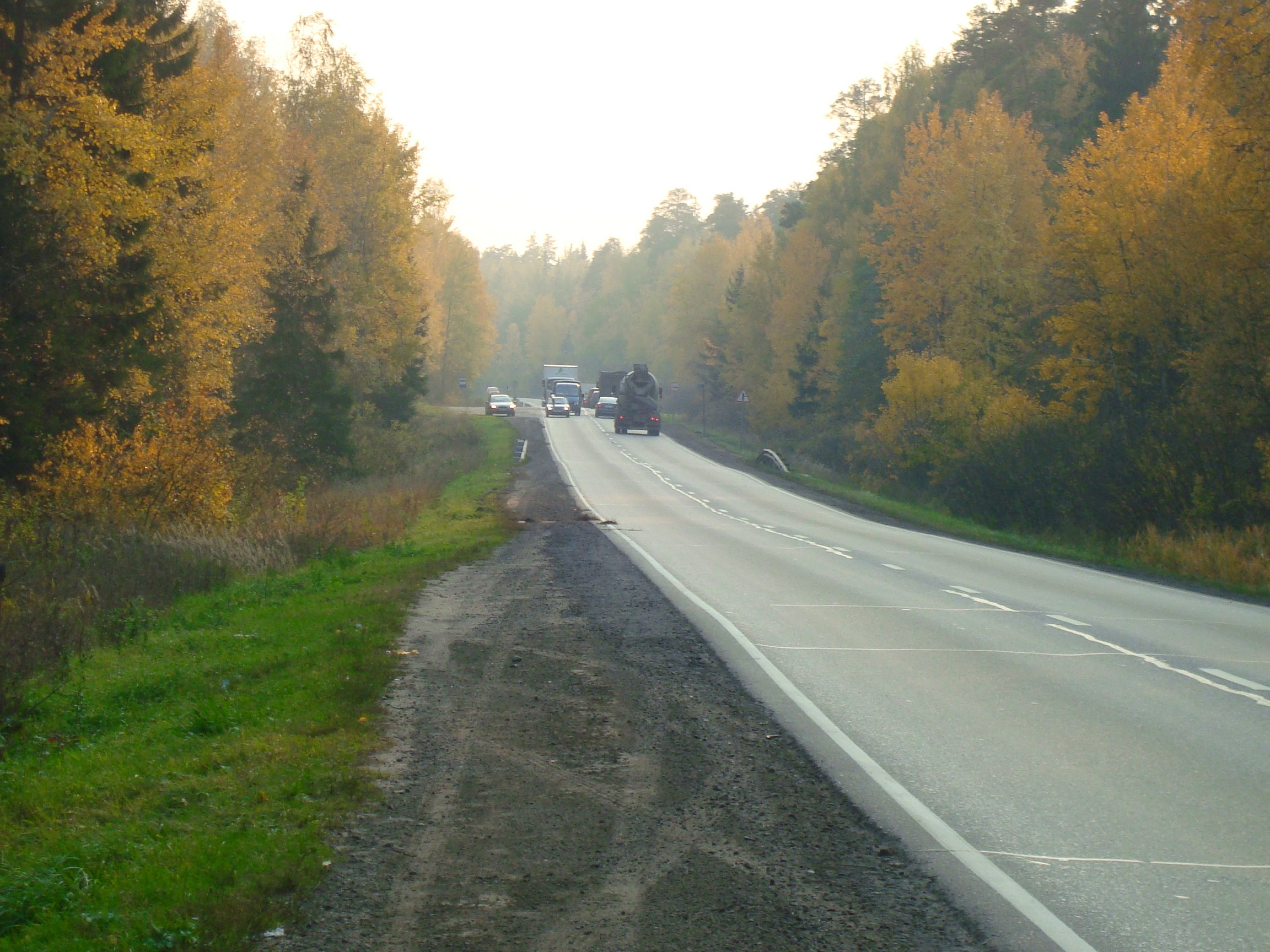

Route information
- Length: 347 km (216 mi)

Location
- Country: Russia

Highway system
- Russian Federal Highways
← A 106	→ A 108

The Moscow Small Ring Road (Russian: Московское малое кольцо), designated as A107, is a Russian federal highway in Moscow Oblast, passing through the cities of Noginsk, Elektrostal, Bronnitsy, Domodedovo, Selyatino, Zvenigorod, Chernogolovka and Sofrino. Part of the road also passes through New Moscow (Troitsky Administrative Okrug). The length of the road is 347 km (216 mi).

== History ==
Along with the Moscow Big Ring Road, the Moscow Small Ring Road was built in the 1950s and 1960s to meet the military transport needs of Moscow's air defenses. There is a widespread opinion that concrete blocks were built precisely from concrete slabs, which were supposedly laid on top of each other in several layers so that the canvas could withstand mobile missile systems. Concrete was poured along technological grips, each of which was 200–300 meters long. The width of the roadway was from 4 to 5 meters; the thickness of the concrete was no more than 25 centimeters, and in some places only 15 centimeters, but capable of withstanding the weight of multi-ton rocket tractors.

Until 1990, the Moscow Small Ring Road was not marked on maps and in road atlases. Information about convenient roads eventually spread among the local population, and both rings became public roads, first de facto, and in the late 1980s de jure. Gradually, the concrete slabs were covered with asphalt, but in the popular consciousness, the rings remained “concrete”. In 2016, the construction of the Central Ring Road toll road began, especially through Malaya Betonka.
