= Shahid Meysami Expressway =

Shahid Meysami Expressway
- بزرگراه شهید ميثمی
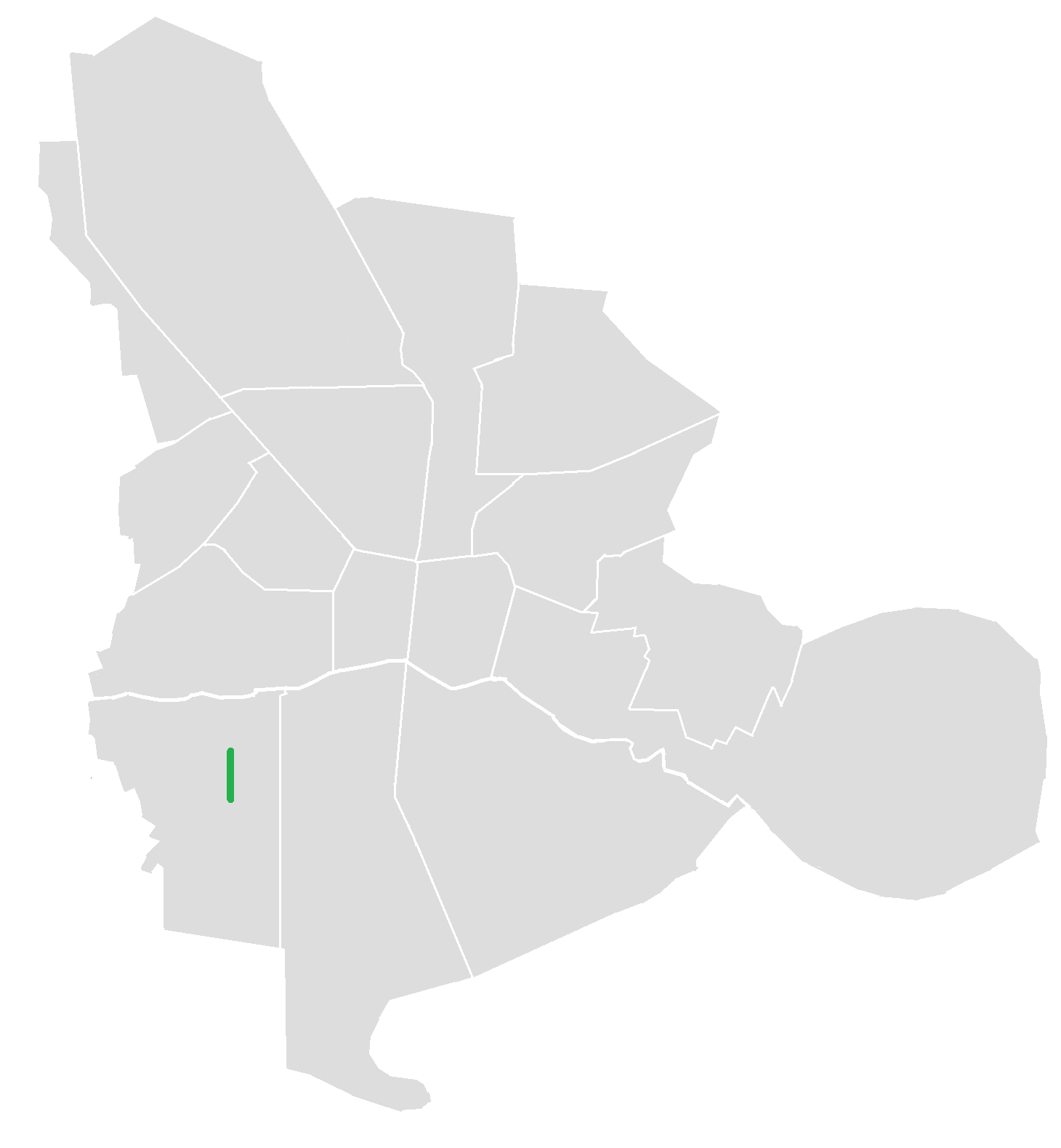

Route information
- Length: 2.3 km (1.4 mi)

Major junctions
- North end: Habibollahi Expressway; Kazemi Avenue; Keshavarz Avenue
- South end: Agharabparast Expressway

Location
- Country: Iran
- Major cities: Esfahan

Highway system
- Highways in Iran; Freeways

Meysami Expressway is an expressway in southwestern Esfahan in Iran. It connects southern and western expressways together.

From East to West
Continues as: Habibollahi Expressway
| Kazemi Boulevard; Keshavarz Boulevard |
| Banu Alavi-e-Homayuni Street |
| Agharabparast Expressway |
From North to South
