= Inner Ring Road, Guangzhou =

Circular road in Guangzhou, China

Inner Ring Road (Chinese: 內環路) is a ring expressway located in the center of Guangzhou, China. Line A runs counterclockwise and Line B runs clockwise. The total length is 26.7 kilometers, of which the elevated road is 20.26 kilometers, most of the road sections are two-way six lanes, the design speed is 60 kilometers per hour, and the total investment is 6.288 billion yuan.

Since the 1990s, Guangzhou’s economy has continued to grow rapidly and the traffic pressure has continued to increase, which has seriously affected Guangzhou’s urban development. For this reason, speeding up the development of urban transportation has become an urgent need. In 1993, the Guangzhou Municipal Government cooperated with the World Bank to carry out the "Guangzhou Transportation Planning Research", and released the final report in June 1994, establishing a strategy for transportation development. Later, the Guangzhou Transportation Planning Research Institute, together with the transportation experts, completed the "Implementation Plan for Transportation Improvement in the Central Area of Guangzhou" and proposed "Continuous Construction "Inner Ring Expressway with high traffic capacity".

The project started on December 25, 1997, with a total investment of 6.288 billion yuan, including a US$200 million loan from the World Bank. A total of 660,000 square meters of buildings were demolished and 12,000 residents were relocated. It was finally opened to traffic on January 28, 2000.

In 2010, the inner ring road underwent a full-line overhaul project, including resurfacing bridge deck asphalt, replacing bridge deck expansion joints, improving drainage facilities, and indicating signs.
