= Tampa Bay Area Beltway =

The Tampa Bay Area Beltway was a proposed beltway in Tampa, Florida. The plan was originally spearheaded by the Tampa-Hillsborough Expressway Authority and would have provided an alternative to Interstate 75, Interstate 275, and parts of Interstate 4. Though the beltway still officially sits on the books, there are currently no plans to build it in the near future.

== History ==
The Tampa Bay Area Beltway was first proposed by the THEA in the mid 1990s with some planning done during that time. However, plans were halted in 2004 when a span for reversible lanes being constructed for the Lee Roy Selmon Expressway collapsed. In Summer 2006, attention shifted back to the beltway plan and the THEA began its efforts to lobby the local governments to support the plan. However, as of 2007, much of the lobbying efforts failed with most attention focusing on mass transit improvements, including the proposal to build a regional rail system, instead of a beltway that would adversely impact rural and environmentally sensitive lands. Environmental criticism has also been brought to attention due to the fear that the beltway would cause immense sprawl. Additionally, Governor Charlie Crist vetoed of a bill that would have provided startup money for a regional transportation authority (now known as TBARTA). Tampa Mayor Pam Iorio also voiced her opposition to the beltway saying that it doesn't fit in with her future transportation vision, which is to utilize light rail and express bus systems throughout Hillsborough County.

Prior to the recent developments, the THEA was presenting the beltway plan to the affected counties and municipalities. In August 2006, the Hillsborough County Commission voted to support the beltway study. Pinellas, Pasco, and Manatee counties would be next in line to view the plans. Construction of the beltway's first phase would have occurred as early as 2010/2011 but there is currently no word if and when planning will resume. As of late 2007, the THEA announced that it will no longer seek to build the highway.

== Proposed routing ==
Several routes were being considered for the beltway. The southern terminus may be at or just north of the I-75/I-275 Junction in northern Manatee County, with the northwestern terminus at US 19 in southern Pasco County. A northern loop may branch off the main beltway near Zephyrhills and re-enter the beltway just east of Odessa. Finally, a northwestern spur near the Suncoast Parkway would connect to Alt. US 19 in northern Pinellas County.
