= Inner Ring Road (Tianjin) =

Road network in Tianjin, China

The Inner Ring Road of Tianjin is a system of roads encircling the downtown of Tianjin, China. The road is not an expressway and is actually a collection of surface divided arterial roads with bike lanes, with traffic lights or roundabouts at most intersections. The major roads composing the Inner Ring Road, going counterclockwise, are Nanjing Road, Qufu Road and Shiyi Jing Road. The road is busy at most times of the day because it serves many major commercial and business districts.
