= Inner Ring Road, Ranchi =

Planned road in Ranchi, India

Route information
- Maintained by Ranchi Municipal Corporation
- Length: 48.61 km (30.20 mi)

Location
- Country: India
- State: Jharkhand

Highway system
- Roads in India; Expressways; National; State; Asian; State Highways in Jharkhand

The Ranchi Inner Ring Road (Hindi: रांची इनर रिंग रोड) will be built in 10 phases is in Ranchi in the Indian state of Jharkhand. Its total length will be 48.61 km (30.20 mi) long. Almost all phases are new construction, though a few are upgrades of existing roads. Work has been started on two phases, while six phases remain to be approved.

== See also ==
- Ranchi Ring Road
