= Daneshgah-e Esfahan Metro Station (Isfahan) =

Metro station in Isfahan, Iran

Daneshgah-e Esfahan Station ایستگاه دانشگاه اصفهان

General information
- Location: Hezar Jarib Boulevard; Districts 5-6, Isfahan; Iran
- Coordinates: 32.6144433°N 51.6637133°E
- System: Isfahan Metro Station
- Operator: Isfahan Urban and Suburban Railways Organization
- Line: 1
- Connections: Isfahan City Buses: 34 Jomhuri Sq. - Soffeh Term.; 36 Hotel Pol - Kuy-e Emam; 37 Azadi - Rahahan; 54 Azadi - Baharestan (Development Co.); 55 Azadi - Baharestan (Valiasr); 61 Hotel Pol - Kuy-e Emam Jafar Sadeq; 62 Hotel Pol - Kuy-e Sepahan; 63 Imam Hossein Sq. - Isfahan Uni.; 76 Azadi - Sepahanshahr (Shahed); 80 Malekshahr T-Jct. - Soffeh Term.; 86 Azadi - Sepahanshahr (Ghadir); 91 Malekshahr - Soffeh

History
- Opened: 27 Esfand, 1396 H-Sh; 18 March 2018; 8 years ago

Services
Preceding station	Isfahan Metro	Following station
Azadi towards Qods (Malek Shahr)	Line 1	Kargar towards Defa'-e Moqaddas
Location

Daneshgah-e Esfahan (Isfahan University) Metro Station is a station on Isfahan Metro Line 1. The station opened on 18 March 2018. It is located on Hezar Jarib in between Mardavij St. and Azadi Ave. The next station on the north side is Azadi Station. The station is located next to University of Isfahan campus, which is its namesake.
