= Kuy-e Emam Metro Station (Isfahan) =

Metro station in Isfahan, Iran

Kuy-e Emam Station ایستگاه کوی امام

General information
- Location: Hezar Jarib Boulevard; Districts 5-6, Isfahan; Iran
- Coordinates: 32.5982294°N 51.6686075°E
- System: Isfahan Metro Station
- Operator: Isfahan Urban and Suburban Railways Organization
- Line: 1
- Connections: Isfahan City Buses: 14 Hotel Pol - Mardavij - Kuy-e Bahar; 34 Jomhuri Sq. - Soffeh Term.; 36 Hotel Pol - Kuy-e Emam; 37 Azadi - Rahahan; 54 Azadi - Baharestan (Development Co.); 55 Azadi - Baharestan (Valiasr); 61 Hotel Pol - Kuy-e Emam Jafar Sadeq; 62 Hotel Pol - Kuy-e Sepahan; 76 Azadi - Sepahanshahr (Shahed); 80 Malekshahr T-Jct. - Soffeh Term.; 86 Azadi - Sepahanshahr (Ghadir); 91 Malekshahr - Soffeh

History
- Opened: 27 Esfand, 1396 H-Sh; 18 March 2018; 8 years ago

Services
Preceding station	Isfahan Metro	Following station
Kargar towards Qods (Malek Shahr)	Line 1	Defa'-e Moqaddas (Soffeh) towards Defa'-e Moqaddas
Location

Kuy-e Emam Metro Station is a station on Isfahan Metro Line 1. The station opened on 18 March 2018. It is located on Hezar Jarib at the intersection with Kuy-e Bahar St., near Kuy-e Emam St., the station's namesake. The next station on the north side is Kargar Station and Defa'-e Moqaddas (Soffeh) Station on the south side. The station is located next to University of Isfahan campus.
