= Kargar Metro Station (Isfahan) =

Metro station in Isfahan, Iran

Kargar Station ایستگاه کارگر

General information
- Location: Hezar Jarib Boulevard; Districts 5-6, Isfahan; Iran
- Coordinates: 32.6069422°N 51.6637643°E
- System: Isfahan Metro Station
- Operator: Isfahan Urban and Suburban Railways Organization
- Line: 1
- Connections: Isfahan City Buses: 34 Jomhuri Sq. - Soffeh Term.; 36 Hotel Pol - Kuy-e Emam; 37 Azadi - Rahahan; 54 Azadi - Baharestan (Development Co.); 55 Azadi - Baharestan (Valiasr); 61 Hotel Pol - Kuy-e Emam Jafar Sadeq; 62 Hotel Pol - Kuy-e Sepahan; 76 Azadi - Sepahanshahr (Shahed); 80 Malekshahr T-Jct. - Soffeh Term.; 86 Azadi - Sepahanshahr (Ghadir); 91 Malekshahr - Soffeh

History
- Opened: 27 Esfand, 1396 H-Sh; 18 March 2018; 8 years ago

Services
Preceding station	Isfahan Metro	Following station
Daneshgah-e Esfahan towards Qods (Malek Shahr)	Line 1	Kuy-e Emam towards Defa'-e Moqaddas
Location

Kargar Metro Station is a station on Isfahan Metro Line 1. The station opened on 18 March 2018. It is located on Hezar Jarib at the intersection with Kargar St., the station's namesake. The next station on the north side is Daneshgah-e Esfahan Station and Kuy-e Emam Station on the south side. The station is located next to University of Isfahan campus.
