= Askeran (disambiguation) =

Askeran may refer to:

- Askeran Region, NKR
- Askeran (town)
- Askeran District (NKAO)
- Askeran Fortress
- Askeran clash, a violent conflict on 22—23 February 1988 in the town of Askeran that was one of the starting points of Armenian-Azerbaijani conflict
