= Donbeh =

Donbeh (Persian: دنبه) may refer to:

- Donbeh, Fars
- Donbeh, Isfahan
- Donbeh-ye Olya, Kerman Province
