= Kargar =

Kargar is a surname. Notable people with the surname include:

- Abbas Kargar (born 1956), Iranian former footballer
- Mohammad Yousef Kargar (born 1963), Afghan football manager
- Mohammad Shakir Kargar (born 1967), Afghan politician
- Rangina Kargar (born 1985), Afghan politician
- Mohsen Haji Hassani Kargar (1988–2015), Iranian Qāriʾ
- Amirhossein Kargar (born 1998), Iranian footballer

== See also ==
- Kargar Boneh Gaz F.C., Iranian football club
- Kargar Metro Station (Isfahan), Station on Isfahan Metro
- Kargar Street, the main street of Amir Abad, is one of the longest streets in Tehran
