= Baba Behbud =

Baba Behbud or Baba bey Behbud Saricali Javanshir
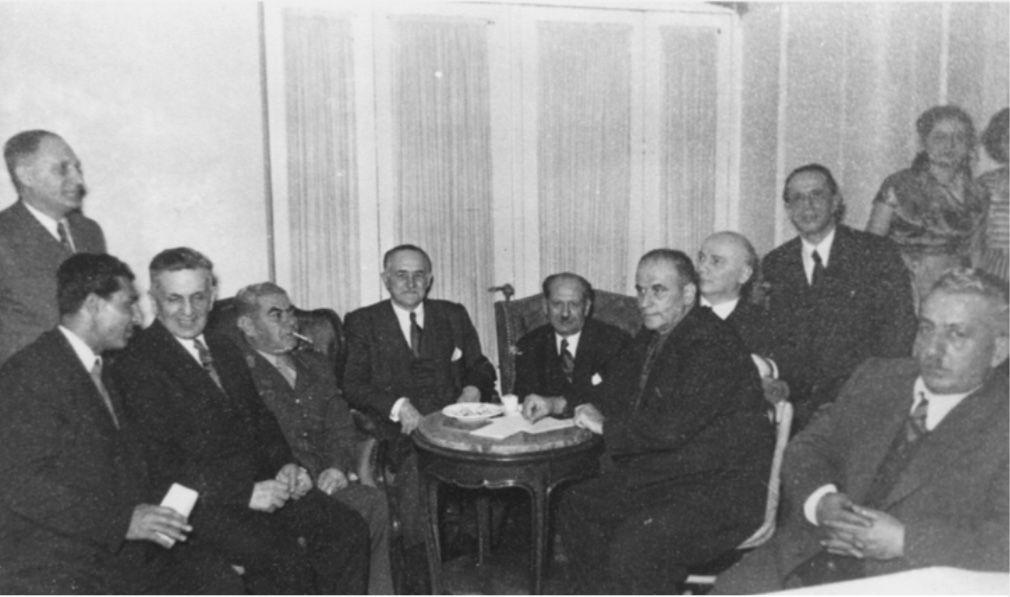
- On the left, the 3rd Baba bey Behbud is seated among Azerbaijani emigrants.
- Born: 1897; Shusha
- Died: July 10, 1970 (aged 72–73); Istanbul, Turkey
- Relatives: Javanshir clan
- Military career
- Allegiance: Azerbaijan Democratic Republic (from 1918 to 1920); Turkey (from 1920 to 1955)
- Branch: Cavalry
- Service years: 1918–1955
- Rank: Colonel
- Commands: Cavalry division in Ankara
- Conflicts: Red Army invasion of Azerbaijan; Ganja revolt Turkish Independence War
- Awards: Medal of Independence

Baba Behbud or Baba bey Behbud Saricali Javanshir (1897 – July 10, 1970) was an emigre, an officer of the Azerbaijan Democratic Republic, and a colonel in the Turkish Armed Forces.

He participated in the Battle of Askeran and the Karabakh uprising against the Soviet occupation following the April invasion.

Behbud also fought in the Turkish War of Independence and served in the Turkish Armed Forces for 35 years.

== Early life and education ==
Baba bey was born in Shusha in 1897. He belonged to the Behbudov noble family from the Karabakh region of Azerbaijan. The family was founded by Behbud Ali bey, the brother of Panah Ali Khan, who was the founder of the Karabakh Khanate. Baba bey's parents were Mustafa bey and Mina khanum. He had two sisters, Afer and Aghca. After the establishment of the Republic of Azerbaijan, he entered the military school which was opened in Ganja in May 1918.

== Career ==
=== In Azerbaijan Democratic Republic ===
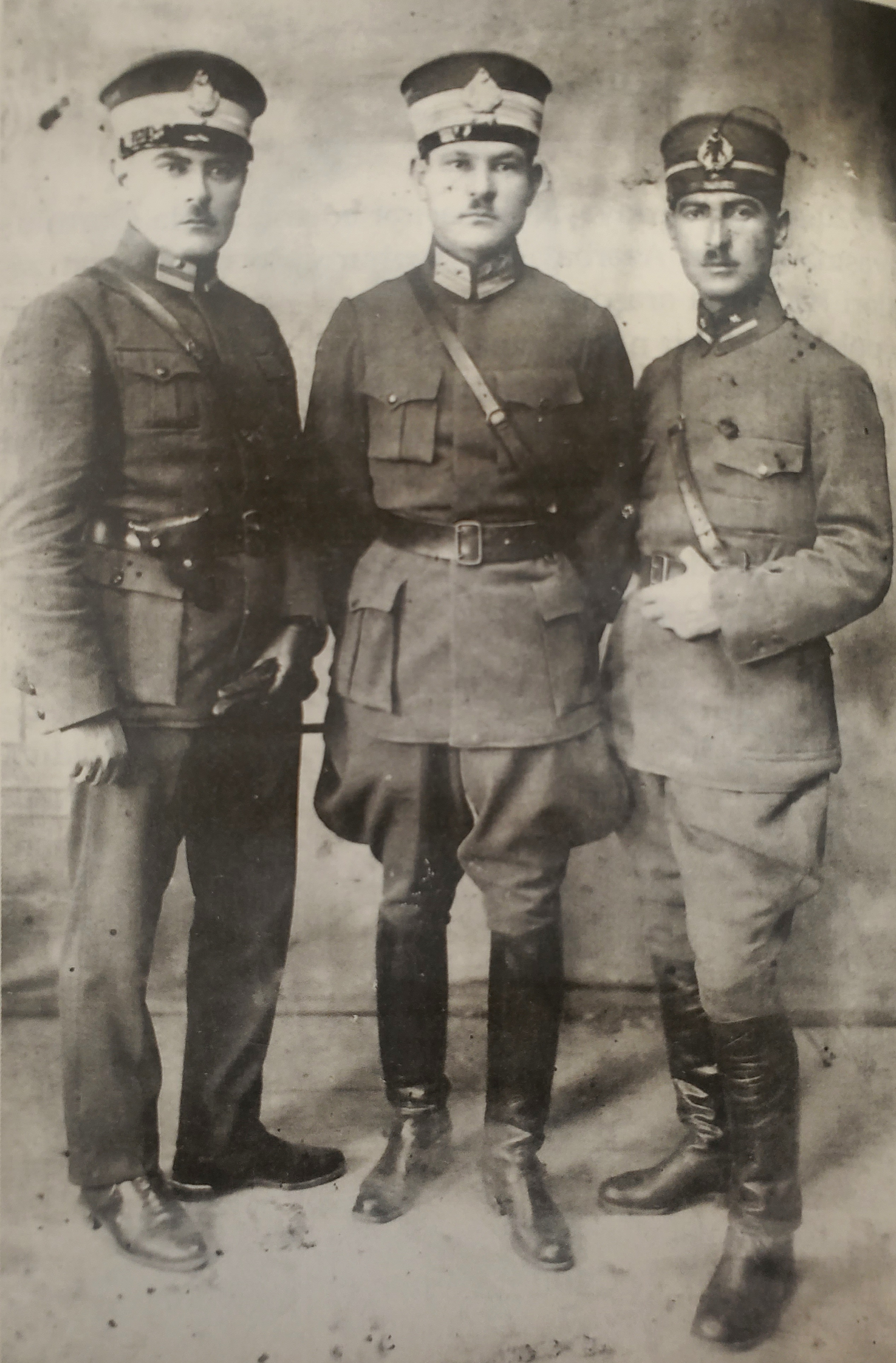
Baba bey Behbud, Samad bey Rafibeyli, and Mammad Agpolad were serving in the Turkish Army.

After graduating from the military school, he started serving in the Karabakh Cavalry Regiment as an officer. As an officer, since the end of 1918, he served in Shusha and surrounding regions for the purpose of neutralizing Armenian separatists in Karabakh. During the inspection held in January 1919, the cavalry regiment served by Baba Bey received personal thanks from the Minister of War for his service.

On March 21, 1920, Armenian-Dashnak forces launched a sudden attack on the positions of the Javanshir Infantry Regiment in Askeran, capturing the Askeran Pass and initiating an uprising. On March 26, 1920, the Azerbaijani army launched a large-scale offensive against Dro’s forces in the direction of Askeran. As an officer of the national army, Baba bey Behbudov participated in these battles as part of the cavalry regiment. The intense battles in Askeran concluded with a victory for the Azerbaijani army. By mid-April, the enemy forces were completely destroyed in the ongoing clashes.

After the occupation of the republic, uprisings against the Bolsheviks began in different parts of Azerbaijan. Baba Bey took part in the Karabakh uprising led by Nuru Pasha on the night of June 3–4, 1920 as part of the Karabakh Cavalry Regiment. The rebels overthrew the Soviet government in Shusha on June 6 and arrested the members of the Shusha Revolutionary Committee. Colonel Zeynalov is appointed the general commander of the national military forces in Karabakh. On June 10, 1920, the Red Army launched a full-frontal offensive against the rebels. Since the Red Army was numerically superior in this attack and used armored vehicles and military aircraft in the battle, the rebels were unable to fight against them and were forced to retreat.

After the suppression of the Karabakh rebellion, Baba Behbudov and the surviving soldiers of the cavalry and infantry regiments of the army of the Republic of Azerbaijan, under the command of Colonel Nuh Bey Sofiev, retreated in the direction of Garyagin and Jabrayil, crossed the Araz river and entered the territory of Iran.

=== In Turkey ===
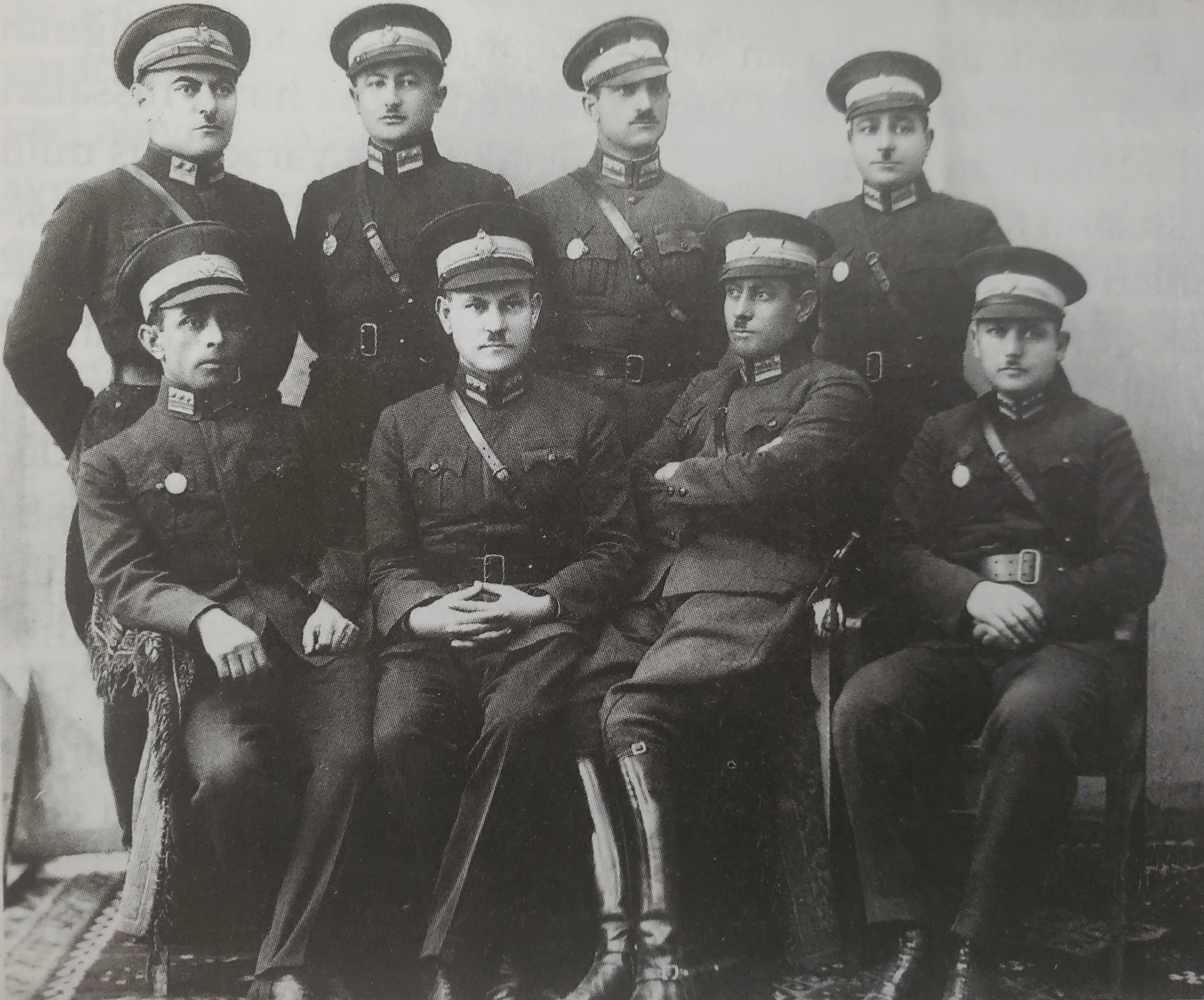
Standing, from left to right: Baba bey Behbud, Mammad Gazakh Gülmammad bey Gazakh, Firudin bey Daryal Firudin Daryal, Demir bey. Sitting, from left to right: Abdullatif bey, Abdussamad bey, Khudadad bey, Hamid bey.

After the uprisings against the Soviet occupation were suppressed, some of the remaining soldiers of the Azerbaijani Democratic Republic’s Army crossed through Zangezur to Nakhchivan, while others headed toward Iran via Khudafarin and eventually reached Turkey. As the Azerbaijani soldiers approached the Turkish borders, their leader, Nuh bey Sofiyev, handed over command to Samad bey Rafibeyli. Under Samad bey’s leadership, they first reached eastern Bayazid, and then, in June–July, they advanced to Hasanqale and Erzurum. Artillery and infantry units also joined the ranks of other divisions during this period. After staying in Erzurum for a while, a decision by the Grand National Assembly of Turkey integrated a 1,200-strong Azerbaijani unit, comprising a cavalry regiment, an infantry regiment, and an artillery battery, into the ranks of the Eastern Army (15th Corps) under Kazım Karabekir Pasha’s command. Baba bey Behbud was among the 56 officers in this 1,200-strong Azerbaijani unit.

As the commander of a company in the Karabakh Cavalry Regiment, Baba bey Behbud initially fought under the 12th Division and later under the 9th Division. He also served as the company commander of the 15th Cavalry Regiment. From the autumn of 1920 to early 1921, he participated in the Eastern Campaign, taking part in the battles for the liberation of Sarıkamış, Kars, Iğdır, Kağızman, and Gyumri.

Subsequently, he joined the "Great Offensive" operations launched to liberate Turkey's western regions from Greek occupation. On September 9, 1922, he and his unit were among the first cavalry to enter İzmir. After the War of Independence, he continued his military service in the Turkish Armed Forces. In 1923, he was awarded the "Independence Medal" for his contributions during the Turkish War of Independence.

In the following years, Baba bey participated in the suppression of several uprisings, including the Sheikh Said Rebellion in 1925, the First Aghrı Rebellion in 1926, and the Second Aghrı Rebellion in 1927.

In 1928, after being granted Turkish citizenship, Baba bey Behbud enrolled in the Istanbul Military Academy. Over the years, he steadily rose through the ranks: captain in 1933, major in 1940, lieutenant colonel in 1944, and colonel in 1948. Later, he was appointed commander of a cavalry regiment in Ankara. In 1955, upon reaching retirement age, Baba bey was honorably discharged from active duty. After retirement, leveraging his language skills and extensive military experience, he joined the Turkish National Intelligence Organization (MIT).

Following the adoption of the Surname Law in Turkey on June 21, 1934, he chose "Behbud" as his surname.

== His activities in exile ==
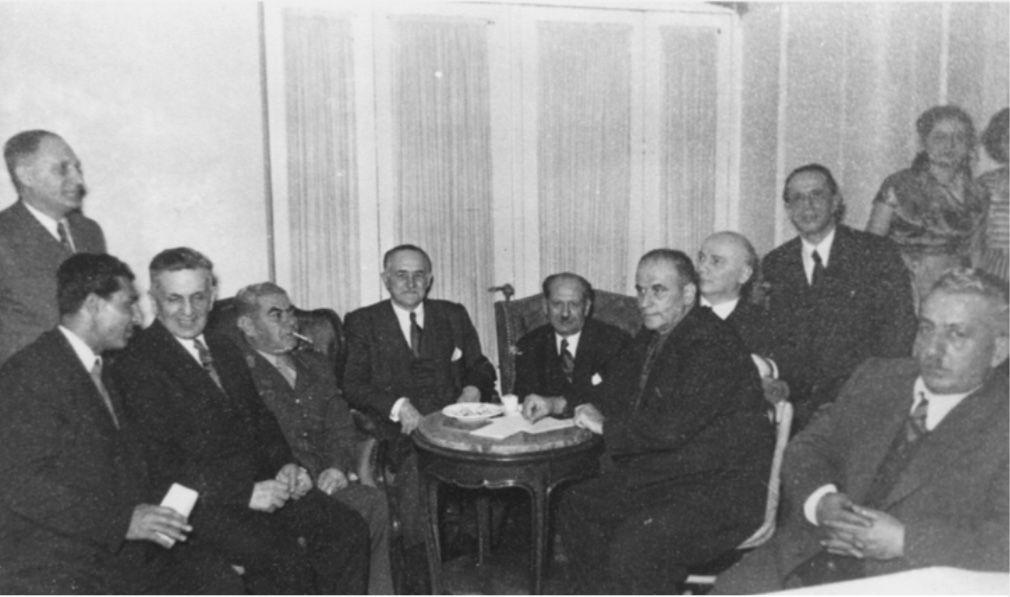
Baba bey to the right of Muhammad Amin Rasulzadeh M.A. Rasulzadeh, with Azerbaijani political emigrants, Ankara, 1950s

During his time in Turkey, Baba bey Behbud maintained close connections with Azerbaijani émigrés. He played an active role in the establishment and operations of the Azerbaijan Culture Association in Turkey.

On May 25, 1958, the association held its annual congress in Istanbul under the chairmanship of Yunis Khazari. Baba bey Behbud was elected to the Supervisory Board as a result of the elections. In 1957 and 1958, he contributed articles to the émigré journal Azərbaycan, where he wrote obituaries for his comrades-in-arms, General Cahangir Berker and Colonel Aslan Berkan, honoring their contributions and legacies.

== Family ==
Baba bey Behbud hailed from the Behbudov family of Karabakh. His father was Mustafa bey, and his mother was Mina khanum. He had an older sister named Agja and a twin sister named Afer.

While serving in Kars, Baba bey met Belkıs Ekinci, and later they married in Istanbul. The couple did not have biological children, but they adopted Belkıs khanum's younger sister, Gunay khanum, as their own.

== Death ==
Baba bey Behbud died on July 10, 1970, in Istanbul. After his funeral prayer at Shishli Mosque, he was buried with a special ceremony at Ferikoy Cemetery.

== Awards ==
- —In 1923, he was awarded the "Istiglal" medal for his services in the Turkish War of Independence.

== See also ==
- Nuri Berköz
- Samad bey Rafibeyli

== Sources ==
- Əhməd, Dilqəm (2018). Bir ildən yüz ilə. Baku: TEAS Press. ISBN 978-9952-310-47-4.
