= Defa'-e Moqaddas (Soffeh) Metro Station (Isfahan) =

Metro station in Isfahan, Iran

Defa'-e Moqaddas (Soffeh) Station ایستگاه دفاع مقدس (صفه(

General information
- Location: Dastgerdi Expressway; Districts 5-6, Isfahan; Iran
- Coordinates: 32.5898343°N 51.6703107°E
- System: Isfahan Metro Station
- Operator: Isfahan Urban and Suburban Railways Organization
- Line: 1
- Connections: Soffeh Bus Terminal Isfahan City Buses: 34 Jomhuri Sq. - Soffeh Term.; 37 Azadi - Rahahan; 54 Azadi - Baharestan (Development Co.); 55 Azadi - Baharestan (Valiasr); 62 Hotel Pol - Kuy-e Sepahan; 76 Azadi - Sepahanshahr (Shahed); 80 Malekshahr T-Jct. - Soffeh Term.; 86 Azadi - Sepahanshahr (Ghadir); 91 Malekshahr - Soffeh

History
- Opened: 27 Esfand, 1396 H-Sh; 18 March 2018; 8 years ago

Services
Preceding station	Isfahan Metro	Following station
Kuy-e Emam towards Qods (Malek Shahr)	Line 1	Terminus
Location

Defa'-e Moqaddas (Soffeh) Metro Station is a station on Isfahan Metro Line 1. The station opened on 18 March 2018. It is located along Dastgerdi Expressway (Isfahan - Shiraz) south of Defa'-e Moqaddas interchange, the station's namesake. The station is Line 1's southern terminus right now. The next station on the north side is Kuy-e Emam Station . The station is located north of Soffeh Terminal, thus connecting to buses connecting Isfahan to towns in the province and cities farther away such as Shiraz and Bandarabbas.
