= Isfahan Wildlife Park =

- 32.592222°N 51.636944°E
- Website: isfahan.ir

Isfahan Wildlife Park پارک آمورشی حیات وحش (Persian: باغ وحش اصفهان) also called Soffeh Zoo پارک وحش صفه is a 5000 meters zoo located in Mount Soffeh park, District 5, Isfahan, Iran run by Isfahan Municipality. Around 318 rescue animals and 3 cloned animals from 36 species were held in the facility as of 1399 mostly in 2 meter cell spaces. This zoo has been highly criticized for its animal cruelty conditions. It was closed an repurposed to animal nursing for a full year since Covid in 2020. It was proposed to be closed down and another safari park be developed in East Park of Isfahan so as to earn revenue for the city's tourism It is supervised through department of environment. The zoo doesn't have green space. City council had tried to close it down in 2020.In August 2024 animals in there were passing out due to heat because of poor air ventilation.

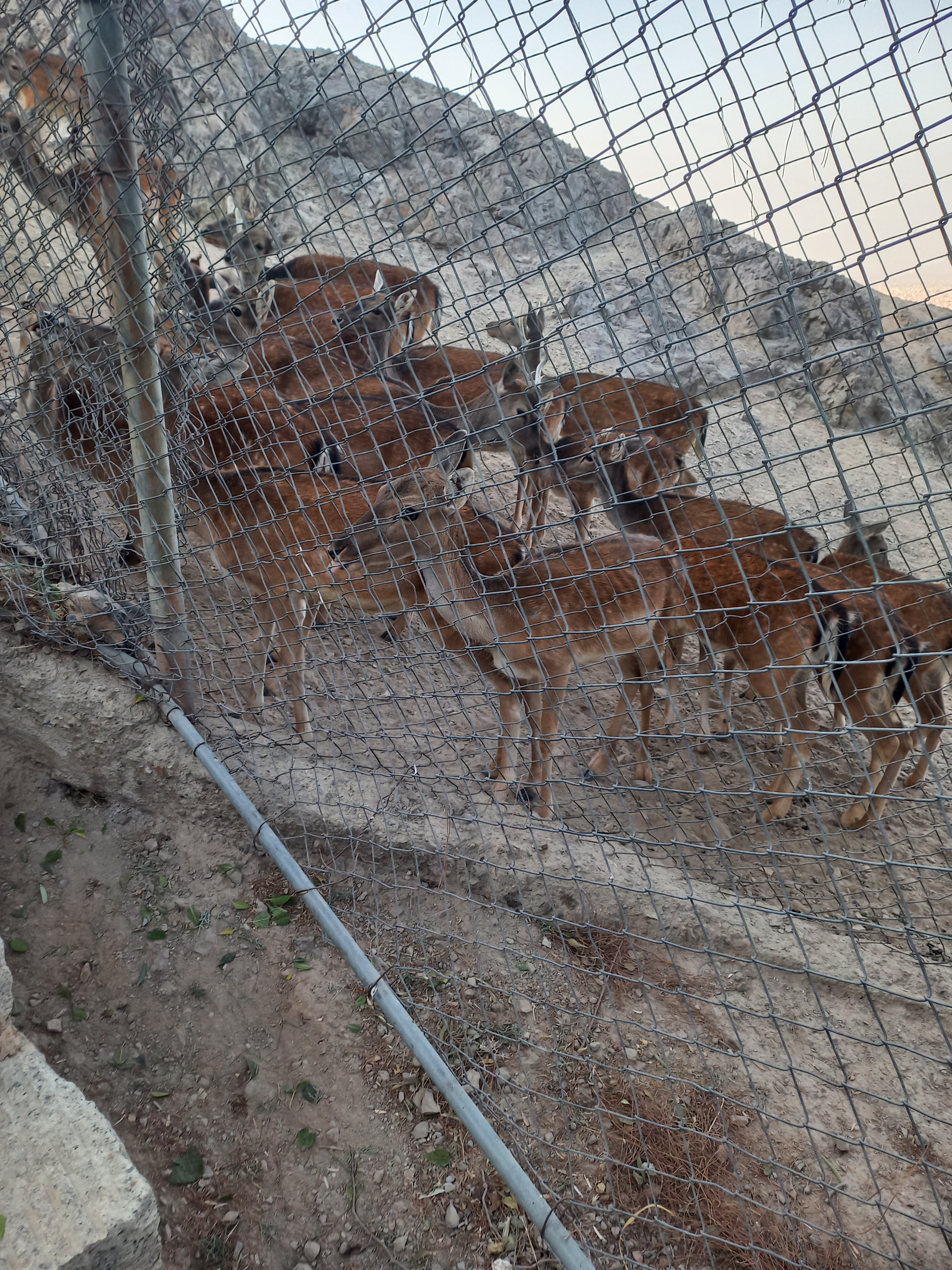

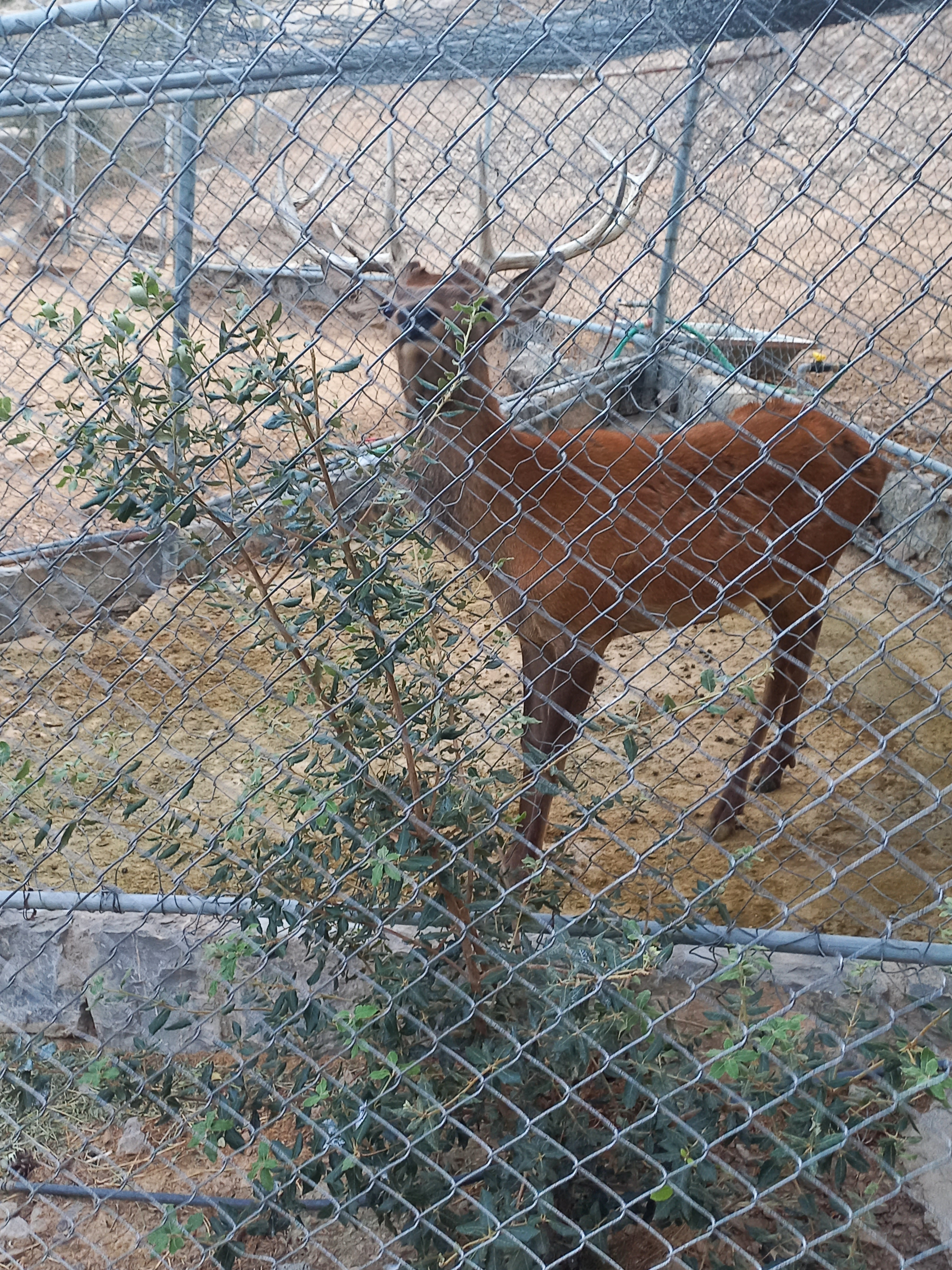

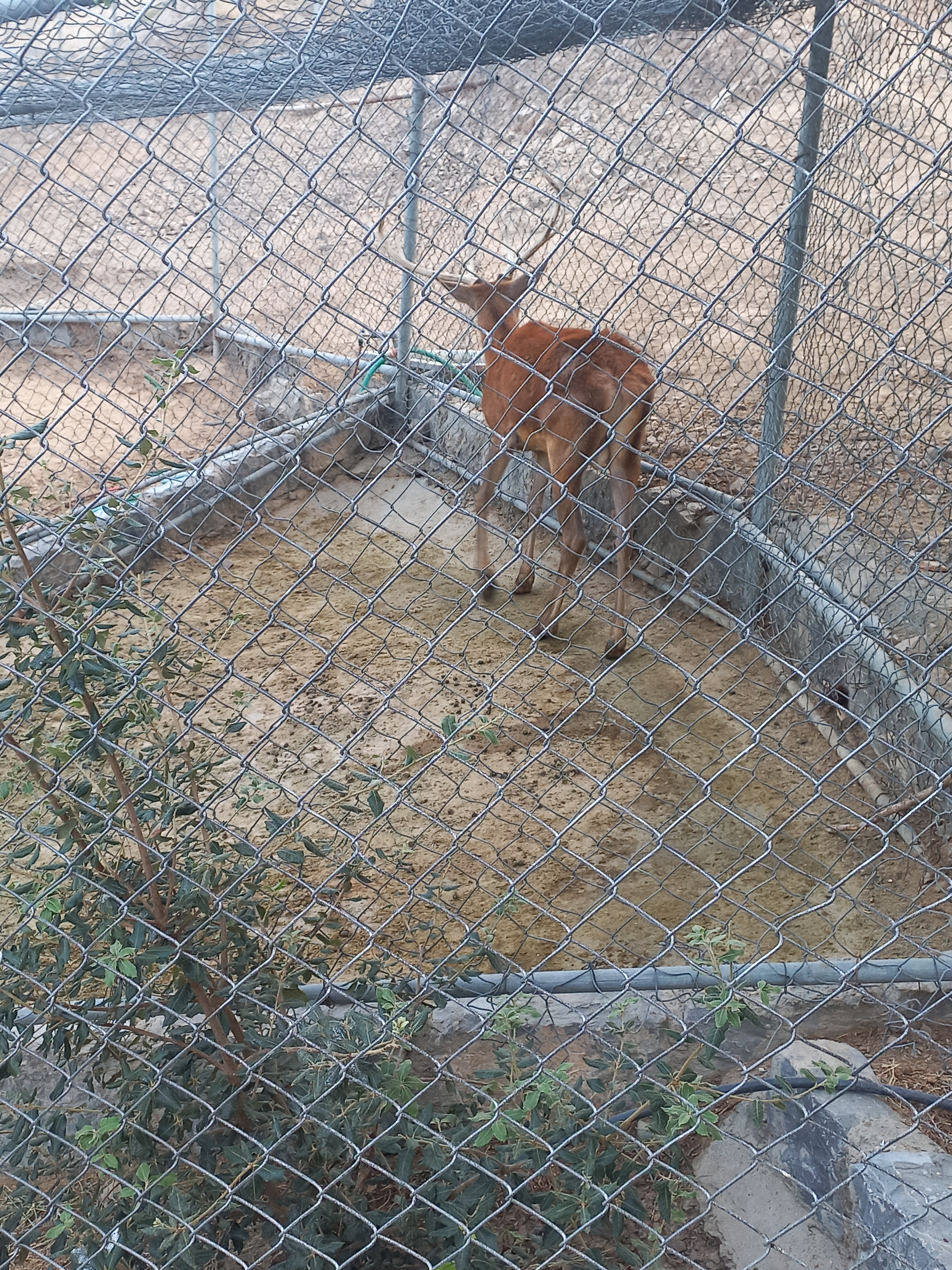

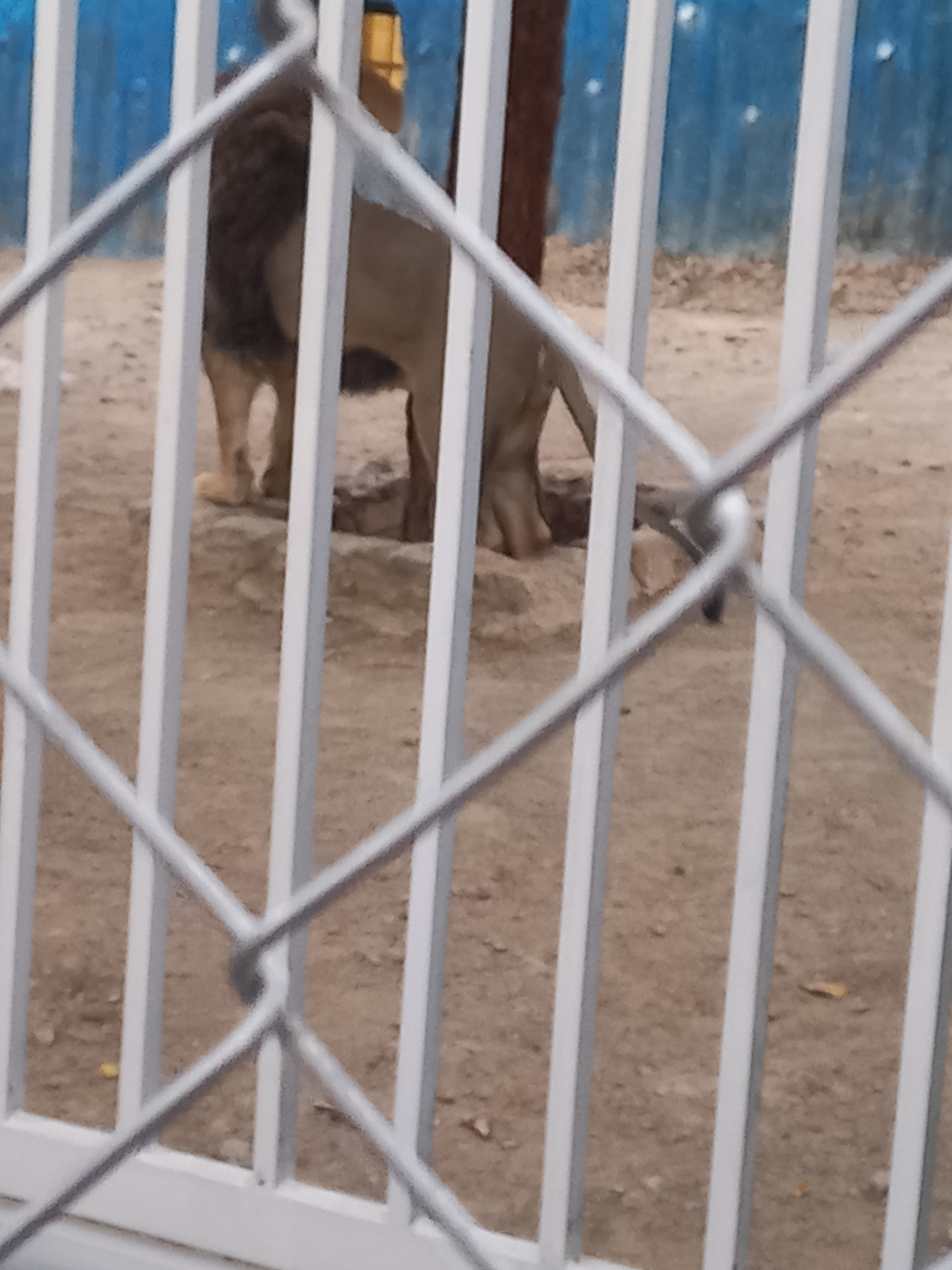
