= Samet Saygın =

Azerbaijani–Turkish military leader

- Azerbaijani: Samed Saygin
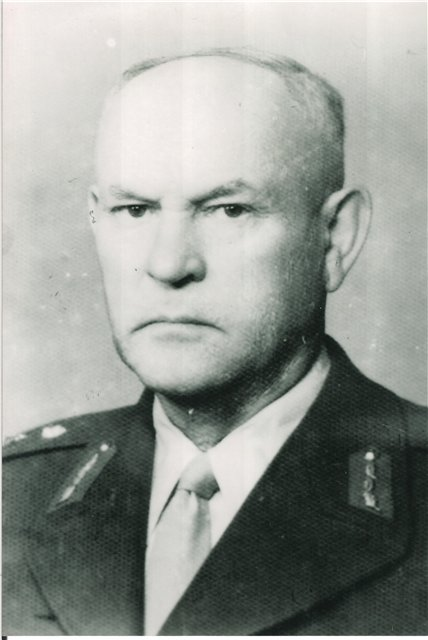
- Born: May 1, 1892; Bala Baghman, Yelizavetpol, Elizavetpol uezd, Elisabethpol Governorate, Russian Empire
- Died: January 19, 1980 (aged 87); Istanbul, Turkey
- Military career
- Allegiance: Russian Empire (from 1916 to 1917); Azerbaijan Democratic Republic (from 1918 to 1920) (Turkey) (from 1920 to 1952)
- Branch: Cavalry
- Service years: 1916–1952
- Rank: Lieutenant colonel of The National Army of Azerbaijan Democratic Republic (from 1918 to 1920); Major general of (Turkey)
- Unit: Cavalry
- Commands: (Azerbaijan) Lankaran reserve battalion (Azerbaijan) 7th Shirvan Infantry Regiment (Azerbaijan) 1st Infantry Jevanshir Regiment (Turkey) 45th Cavalry Regiment
- Conflicts: First World War; Armenian–Azerbaijani War; 1920 Ganja revolt Turkish War of Independence
- Awards: Medal of Independence

Samet Saygın (born Samad bey Mashadi bey oghlu Rafibeyli (Azerbaijani: Səməd bəy Məşədi bəy oğlu Rəfibəyli) was an Azerbaijani and Turkish military leader, lieutenant colonel of the Azerbaijan Democratic Republic, major general (1948) of the Turkish Republic. The first Azerbaijani to reach the rank of general in the Turkish Armed Forces, where he is known under the name Sayqin.

== Military service ==
Born in 1892 in the Bala Baghban quarter of the city of Elizavetpol, now the city of Ganja of Azerbaijan. Graduated from the Tiflis Military School. On January 1, 1916, he was sent as a junior officer to the 7th Caucasian Border Infantry Regiment. This time he was a commander of team.

In December 1917, a Muslim Special Corps (since June 26, 1918, the Azerbaijani Special Corps) was established. He was included in this corps in January 1918. This corps was created by the order of commander-in-chief of the troops of the Caucasian Front, General of Infantry M.A Przhevalsky. on 22 January he was promoted

From January 22 - company commander of the 1st Baku Infantry Regiment of the 1st Infantry Division. On July 2, 1918, he was promoted first to lieutenant, and then to staff captains. On January 22, he became the team commander of the 1st Infantry Division of the 1st Baku Infantry Regiment. On July 2, 1918, he was promoted first to lieutenant and then to stabskapitän.

=== Service in Azerbaijan ===
In May–July 1918, when the Caucasus Islamic Army was formed under the command of Lieutenant General Nuri Pasha, the Azerbaijani Special Corps was also included in this union. In early July, the process of disbanding the corps began. On August 13, by order of Nuri Pasha, the Separate Azerbaijan Corps, as an independent unit, was disbanded, stabskapitän Rafibekov was temporarily sent to the disposal of the Commissioner of Railways.

After the Mudros armistice and the beginning of the evacuation of Ottoman troops from Azerbaijan, on November 1, by a decree of the Council of Ministers of the Republic of Azerbaijan, the War Ministry was established and work began on the creation of a national army. On February 3, 1919, Rafibekli was appointed acting senior adjutant of the headquarters of the 1st infantry division stationed in Aghdam. Soon after, he was appointed commander of the 3rd Battalion of 1st Infantry of Jevanshir Regiment of 1st Infantry Division. From the report of Rafibekli to the commander of the 1st Infantry Javanshir Regiment, Lieutenant Colonel Israfilov:

In this brief note about my service, I inform you that I have served corresponding to the rank of captain ... and therefore I am asking for your petition to be promoted to the rank of captain.

On June 25, 1919, Rafibeyli was promoted to captain for service and soon after, on August 26, was appointed commander of the newly formed Lankaran Reserve Battalion. From the order for the military department number 373:

The captain of the I infantry Jevanshir regiment Rafibekli was appointed commander of the newly formed Lankaran Reserve Battalion. The named chief officer should immediately proceed to the formation of a reserve battalion and report on its formation. The battalion is subordinate in all respects to the chief of the 2nd Infantry Division.

— Minister of War, General of Artillery Mehmandarov. Baku, August 26, 1919

On December 1, 1919, Rafibeyli was temporarily appointed commander of the newly formed 7th Shirvan Infantry Regiment. On January 25, 1920, he was promoted to lieutenant colonel and appointed commander of the 1st Jevanshir infantry regiment. From the order of the Acting Minister of War, General of Artillery Aliagha Shikhlinski:

Announcing this, - on behalf of the service, I bring my sincere gratitude to Lieutenant Colonel Rafibekov for his honest and selfless service, I am sure that in the new place he will prove to be quite worthy of the trust that he deservedly enjoys at the present time and will quickly put the Jevanshir regiment to its due height.

In March 1920, units of the regiment successfully operated in the battles in Karabakh. Lieutenant Colonel Rafibeyli commanded one of the detachments of the grouping of Azerbaijani troops under the general command of the General Staff of Major General Salimov. According to the report of General Salimov to General of Artillery A. Shikhlinsky, temporarily managing the Ministry of War, on April 14, the detachment of Lieutenant Colonel Rafibekov distinguished itself in the four-day Keshishkend operation. After the invasion of Azerbaijan by Bolshevik troops in April 1920, Samed bey Rafibeyli took part in the Ganja uprising.

=== Service in Turkey ===
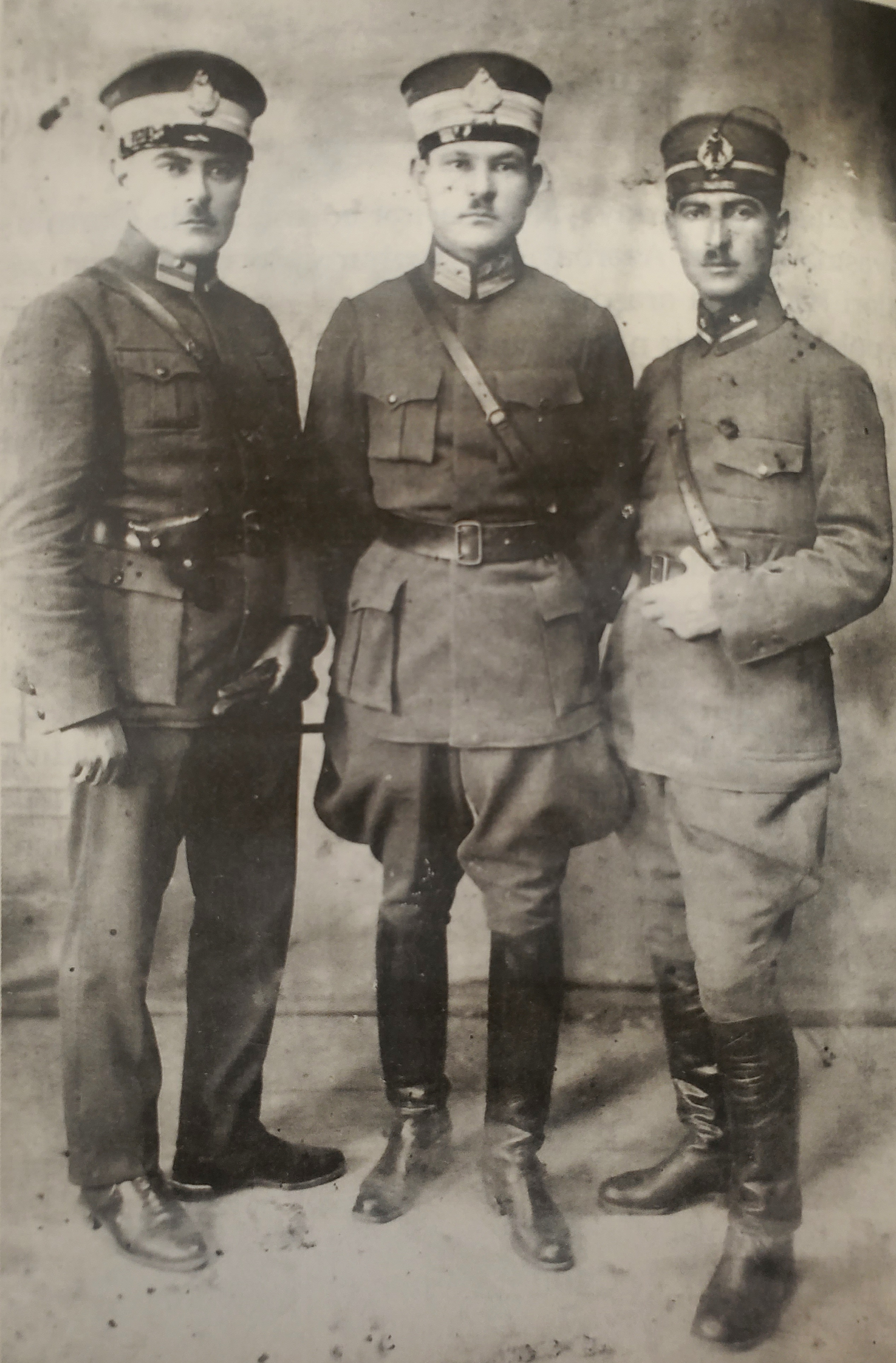
Baba Behbud, Samet Saygın and Mehmet Akpolat while serving in the Turkish Army

He later moved to Turkey, where he continued his military service. On July 1, 1920, he was appointed deputy commander of the Azerbaijani regiment as part of the Eastern Front of the Turkish army. He took part in military operations on the Armenian and Iraqi fronts and in the war for the independence of Turkey. From March 1921 to November 1922 he was chief of the translation department on the Eastern Front. From November 1922 to November 1924 he was deputy commander of the XV Cavalry Regiment of the VI Cavalry Division. From 1924 to November 1928, he was representative officer in the 6th Cavalry Division. In 1928–1930, he took refresher courses at a military school. After graduation, he was appointed commander of a cavalry detachment in the 13th Cavalry Regiment. He enlisted in the V Cavalry Regiment in 1932 and in 1935 became the commander of the regiment. In 1938, he became deputy commander of the 41st Cavalry Regiment, and in 1940 was appointed commander of the intelligence unit of the 3rd Army. From August 15, 1942, he was appointed commander of the 45th Cavalry Regiment. On August 30, 1942, he was promoted to colonel. On August 28, 1948, he was promoted to major general and appointed commander of the 2nd Cavalry Brigade. On August 2, 1952, he was appointed a member of the Turkish Land Forces Inspection Group.

After the adoption of the law on surnames in Turkey, he took the surname Sayqın. He was awarded a combat medal and the Medal of Independence, 1st degree.

He died on January 19, 1980.

== Sources ==
- Рафибековы — династия врачей, оставившая яркий след в истории кыргызского здравоохранения
- İstiqlal mücahidi: Türkiyə ordusunun generalı Səməd bəy Rəfibəyli
- Səməd bəy Rəfibəyli — Azərbaycan diasporunun görkəmli nümayəndələrindən biri kimi
- Адрес-календарь Азербайджанской Республики. — Баку, 1920
