= Mount Soffeh =

Mountain in Isfahan province, Iran

Coordinates: 32.5956°N 51.6436°E

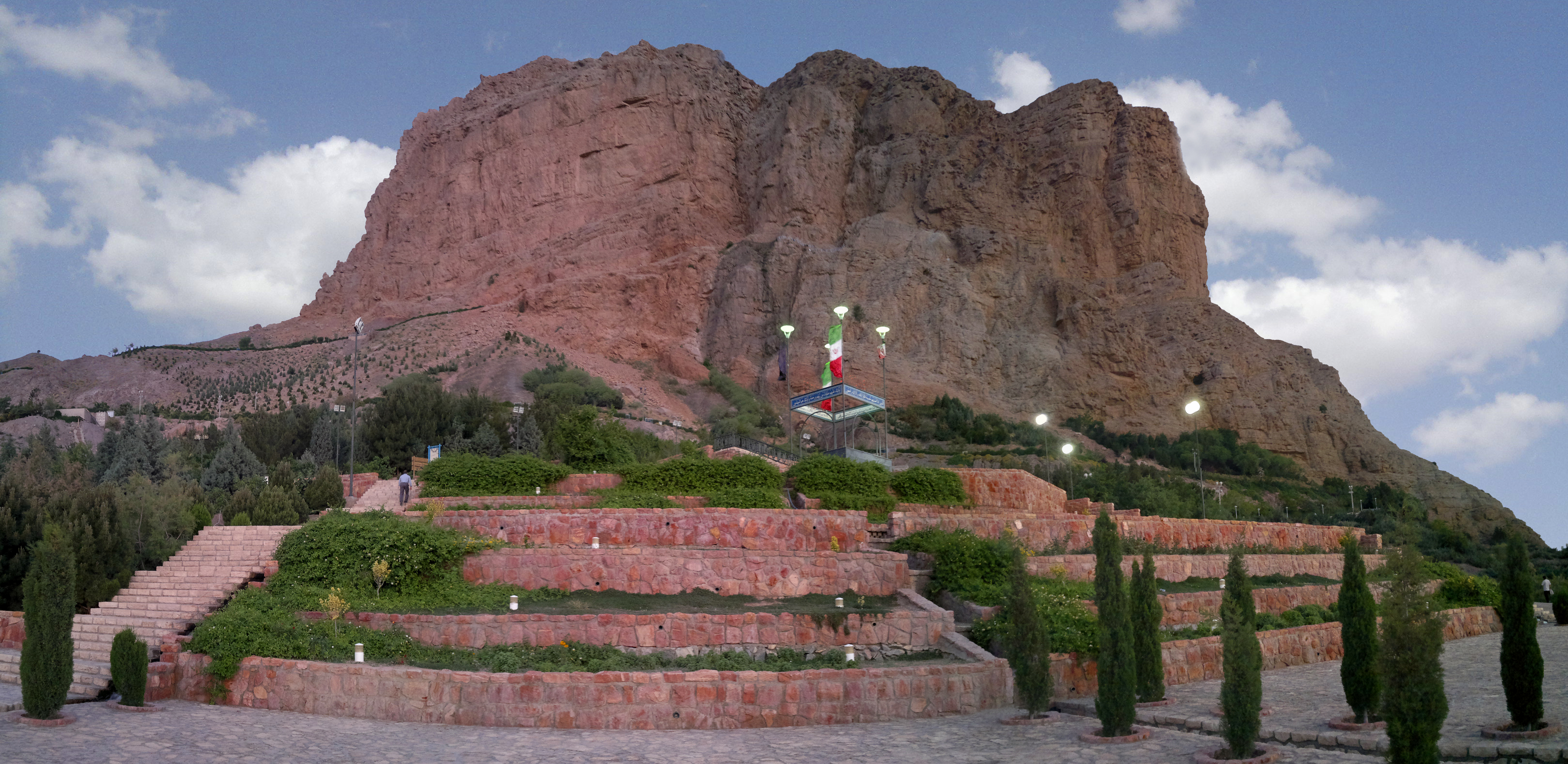

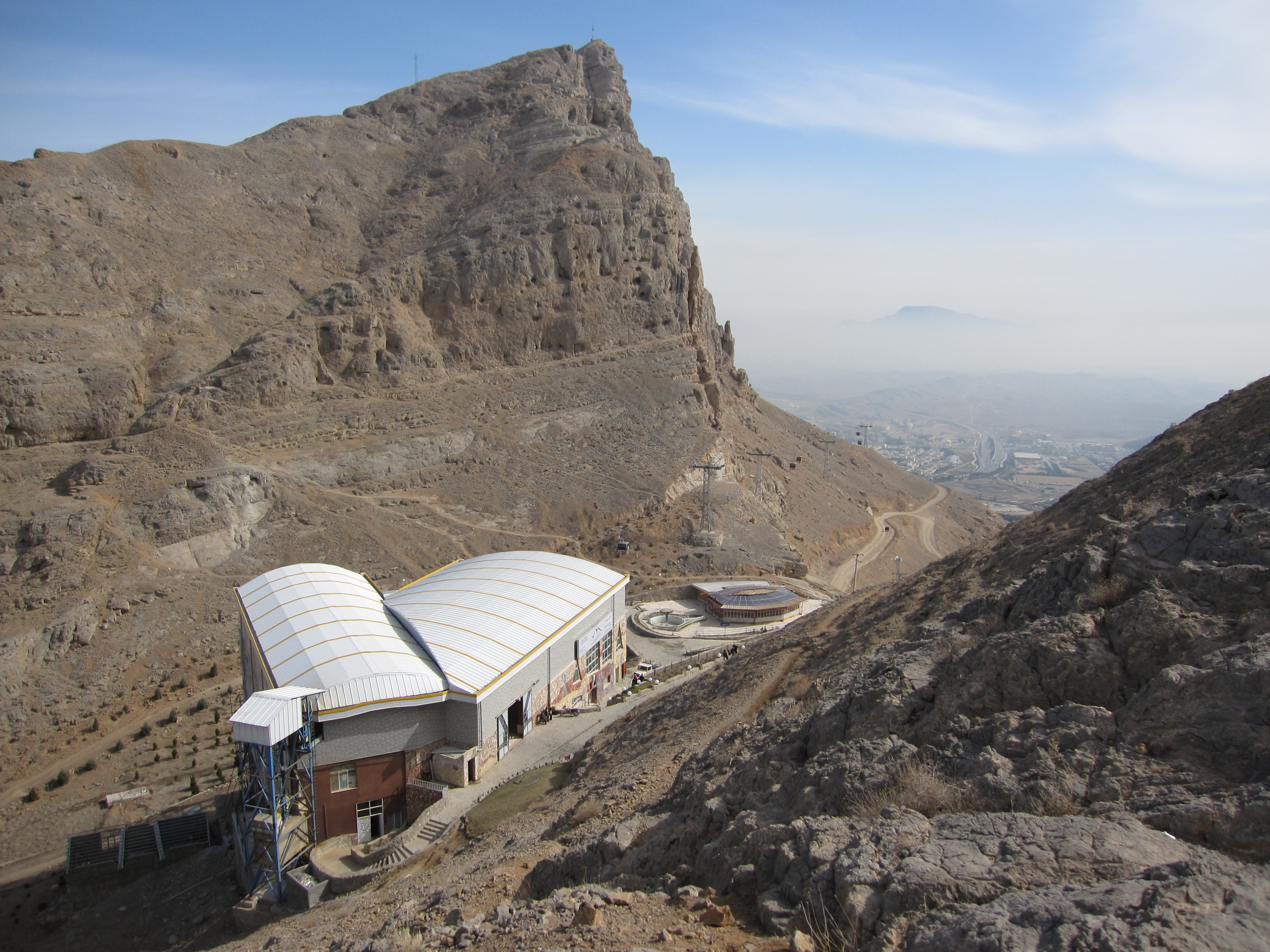

Mount Soffeh (Persian: کوه صفه, romanized: Kuh-e Soffeh) is a mountain situated just south of the city of Isfahan, southeast of Mount Donbeh and south of the Zayanderud River in Iran.

== Etymology ==
The term "soffeh" in Persian is derived from an Arabic word "soffa" that means "stone bench" or "sofa" or "raised platform". But there are different opinions about the origin of the name of this mountain. There is this belief that the name of this mountain comes from the name of a mystic called "Mir Ali-ye Soffeh" who lived and prayed in this mountain in the second half of the 17th century during the reign of Shah Suleiman I. This is related to the belief that the mountain was used as a refuge by Sufis or Muslim mystics.

It is also believed that the word "soffeh" is somehow related to the word "safa" (meaning "purity", "pleasantness" and "enjoyment") or pleasure that is obtained and felt by visiting this mountain. There is also this opinion that "soffeh" is somehow related to the Persian word "spah" or "sepah" (meaning "army") and therefore it is related to the word "spahan" or "sepahan" (meaning a place for the army), which is the etymological origin for the name of Isfahan. And of course, there is this idea that the reason for the name "soffeh" is the existence of a flat raised platform at the foot of the mountain.

== Geology ==
Mount Soffeh is mainly made of Lower Cretaceous limestone. Only a very small narrow section of the lowest part of the mountain is formed chiefly of Jurassic shale. Mount Soffeh is located in the Sanandaj-Sirjan geological and structural zone, a geologic zone that is in the east and parallel to the Zagros geological and structural zone.

== Geography ==
With an elevation of 2257 metres, Mount Soffeh is the nearest mountain which is situated just south of the city of Isfahan. The mountain was a few kilometres far from Isfahan, but with the expansion of the city, now it is just located at the southern part of the city. This mountain is about 590 metres high from the ground level. There are some small water springs in Mount Soffeh. On the eastern side of Mount Soffeh there are a series of hills. Isfahan to Shiraz road passes through these hills. There are remnants of a few ruined buildings which might have been used as some sorts of castles and fire temples in the distant past (see Shahdiz). Mount Soffeh and its surrounding hills have been converted to a beautiful park which covers at least 100 hectares. A wonderful panoramic view of the metropolitan city of Isfahan can be seen from the mountain especially at night. The mountain is the closest slope for some citizens of Isfahan who practice mountain climbing. There is a small zoo with a few wild animals and birds at the foot of the mountain. There are also restaurants, a gondola lift cable cars and other recreational facilities.

== See also ==
- Isfahan Wildlife Park
