= Mount Donbeh =

Mountain in Iran

Mount Donbeh or Kuh-e Donbeh is a mountain which is situated just southwest of the city of Isfahan in Isfahan province in Iran. Stretching in a northwest–southeast direction, Mount Donbeh is located south of the Zayanderud River and northwest of Mount Soffeh in the Sanandaj-Sirjan geologic and structural zone of Iran. The mountain is mainly formed of Lower Cretaceous limestone. Only the southeastern part of the mountain is made of Jurassic shale.
