= Askeran Fortress =

Fortress in the Khojaly District of Azerbaijan

Askeran fortress
- Armenian: Մայրաբերդ, romanized: Mayraberd; Azerbaijani: Əsgəran qalası
- Askeran, Azerbaijan
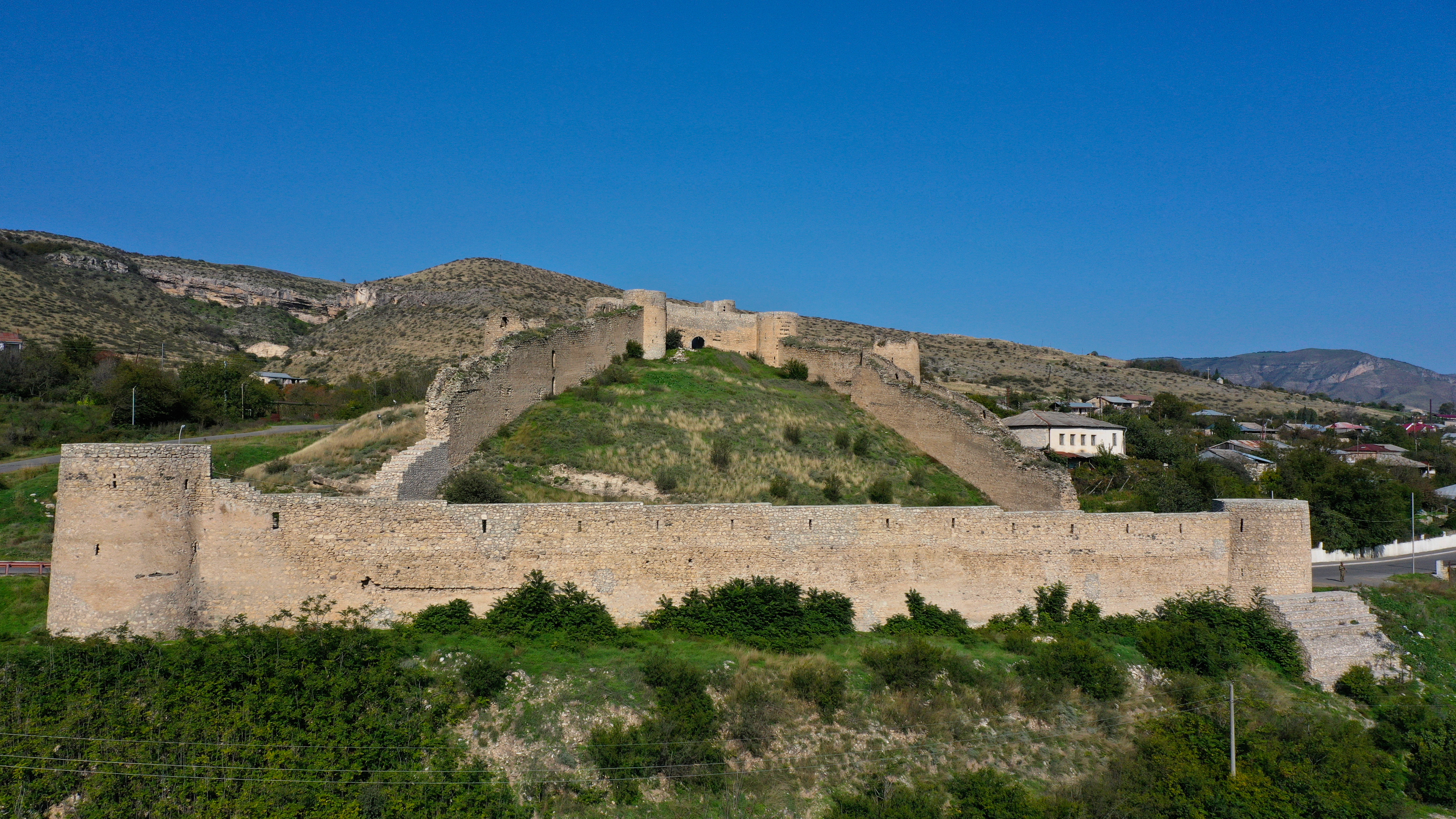
- The fortress in October 2023

Site information
- Type: Fortress

Location
- Coordinates: 39.9333°N 46.8314°E

Site history
- Built: 1751
- Materials: Cobblestone

Askeran Fortress (Armenian: Մայրաբերդ, romanized: Mayraberd; Azerbaijani: Əsgəran qalası) is a fortress in the town of Askeran. Located on the banks of the Qarqar River, its current structure was built in the 18th century and consists of two sections. The left-bank section features a double line of stone walls.

== History ==
In the Middle Ages, at this location, there was a fortress and an Armenian village called Mayraberd. In the Armenian Melikdom of Varanda, the Askeran fortress protected the eastern frontier of Varanda from the semi-autonomous Karabakh Khanate, under Iranian suzerainty. In the 18th century, the fortress was expanded by the Karabakh Khan Panah Ali Khan. From 1788-1789, the current structure of the fortress was built. In 1795, the fortress was captured by the forces of Agha Mohammad Khan Qajar, who attempted to restore Iranian rule in the southeastern Caucasus.

During the Russo-Persian War of 1804–1813 the Russian encampment was near the fortress. In 1810 the peace talks between the Russians and Persians were conducted at the fortress.

During 2018, the walls and towers of the fortress were restored. The purpose of the restoration is to preserve the monument, as well as making the place of interest for tourists.

== Architectural features ==
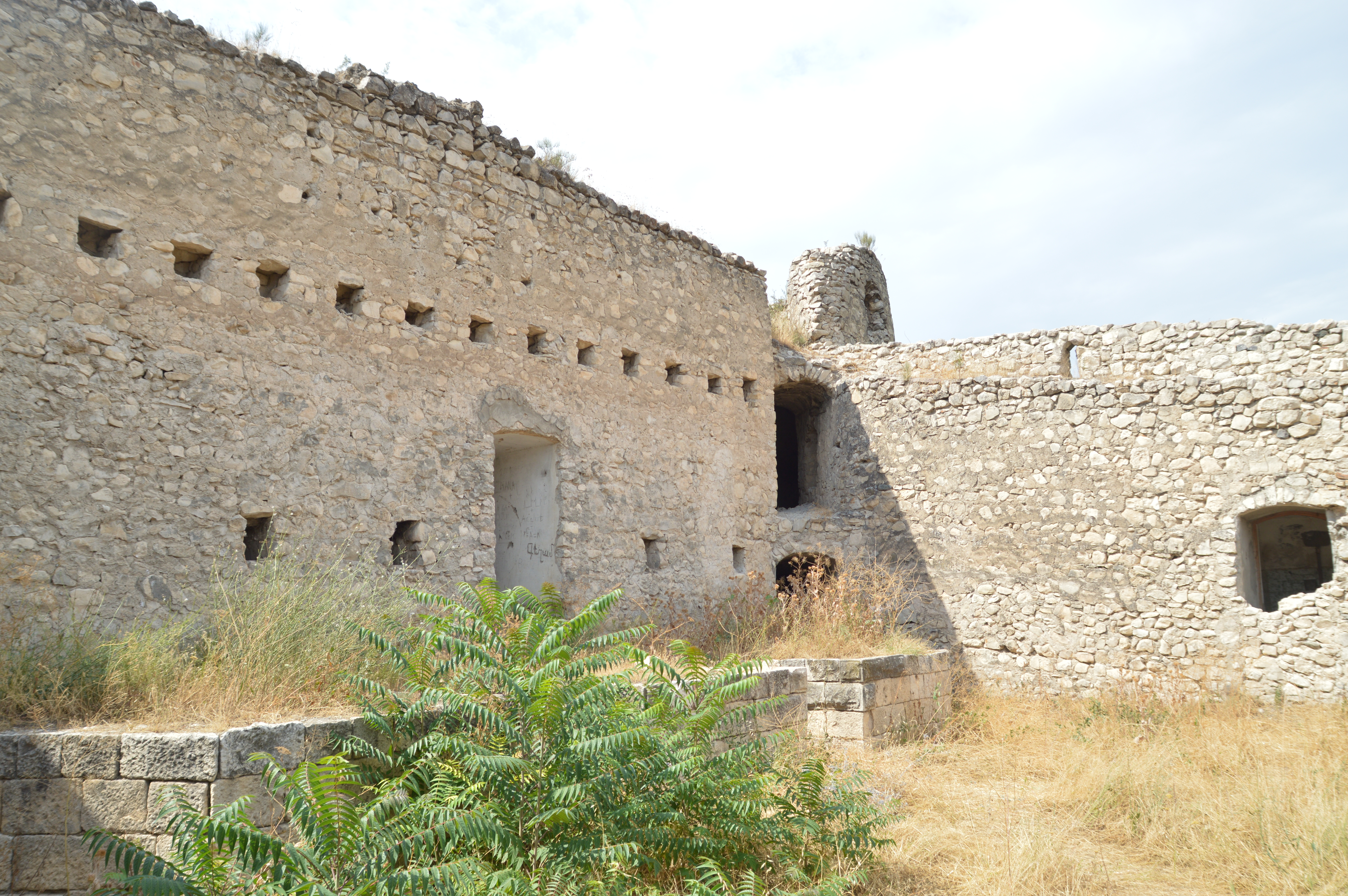
Interior of the fortress

The fortress is located on the southern outskirts of the Askeran town, in a gorge of the Karabakh mountains. The walls of the fortress stretch over 1.5 kilometers along the Qarqar river valley. It is strengthened with double walls that are roughly 2 meters thick and 9 meters tall, equipped with various strategic openings. They are connected by limestone towers that served as observation posts through narrow corridors used for communication. The fortress is built on a rounded plan and made from cobblestone.

== Gallery ==
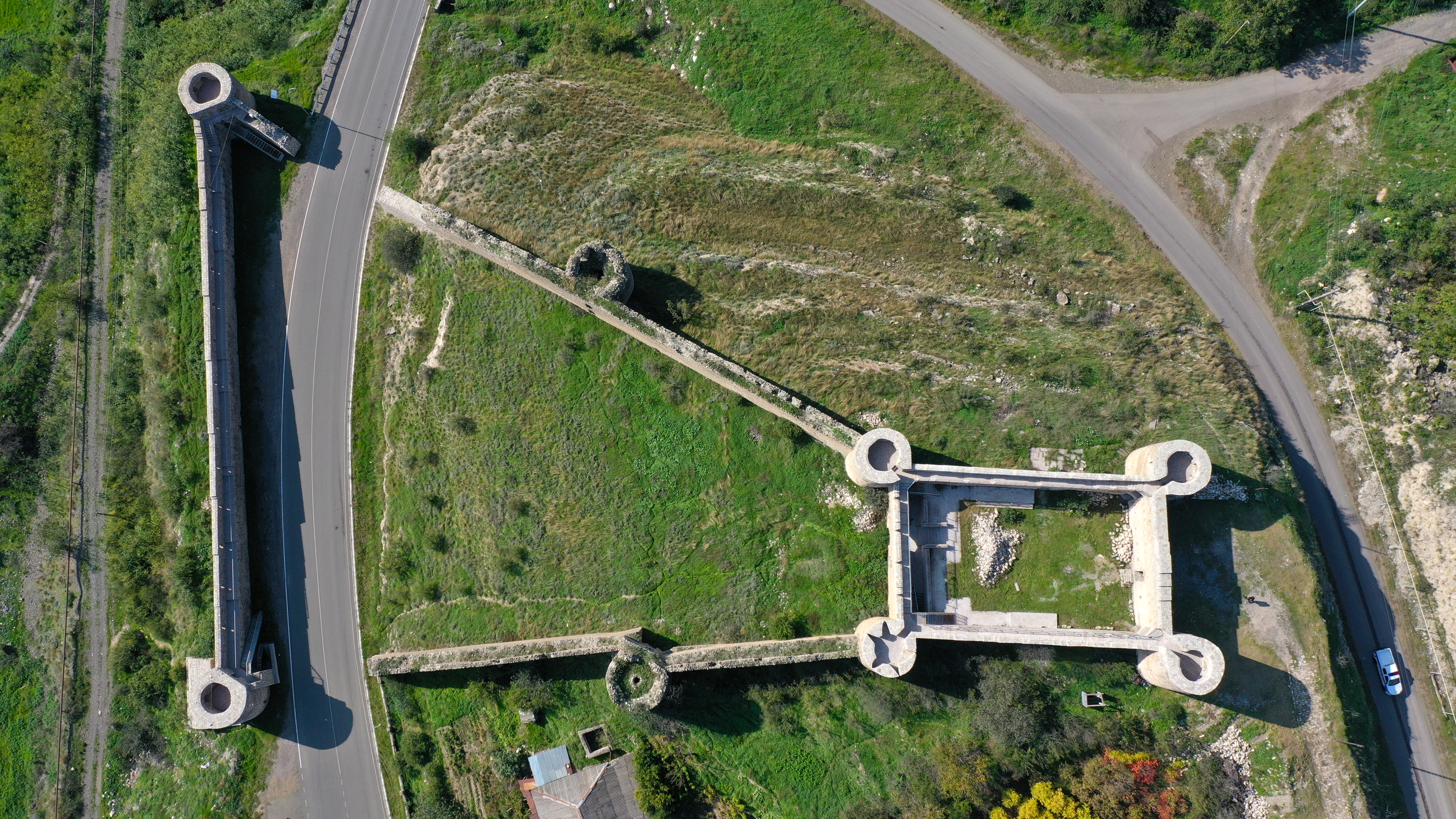
Aerial view of the fortress

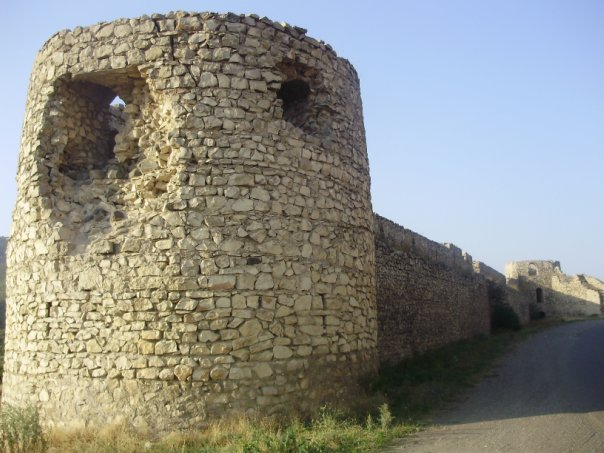
One of the towers of the fortress

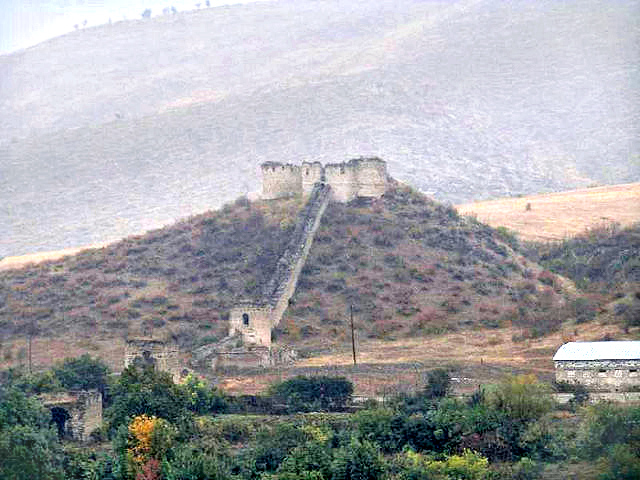
General view

== Notes ==
=== Bibliography ===
- Behrooz, Maziar (2023). Iran at War: Interactions with the Modern World and the Struggle with Imperial Russia. I.B. Tauris. ISBN 978-0-7556-3737-9.
- Bournoutian, George (2016a). "Prelude to War: The Russian Siege and Storming of the Fortress of Ganjeh, 1803–4". Iranian Studies. 50 (1). Taylor & Francis: 107–124. doi:10.1080/00210862.2016.1159779. S2CID 163302882.
- Hakobyan, T. Kh.; Melik-Bakhshyan, St. T.; Barseghyan, H. Kh. (1986). "Ասկերան" [Askaran]. Հայաստանի և հարակից շրջանների տեղանունների բառարան [Dictionary of Toponymy of Armenia and Adjacent Territories] (in Armenian). Vol. V. Armenia: Yerevan State University Publishing House. p. 336.
- Hewsen, Robert H. (1972). "The Meliks of Eastern Armenia: A Preliminary Study". Revue des Études Arméniennes. Nouvelle série. IX: 285–329.
- Mkrtchyan, Shahen [in Armenian] (1988). Ulubabyan, Bagrat (ed.). Historical and Architectural Monuments of Nagorno-Karabakh (PDF). Yerevan: Parberakan. pp. 161–162. ISBN 5-540-00402-7.
