= Donbeh-ye Olya =

Donbeh-ye Olya دنبه عليا
- Village
- Location within Iran
- Coordinates: 30°11′38″N 55°29′56″E
- Country: Iran
- Province: Kerman
- County: Shahr-e Babak
- Bakhsh: Central
- Rural District: Meymand

Population (2006)
  - Total: 73
- Time zone: UTC+3:30 (IRST)
  - Summer (DST): UTC+4:30 (IRDT)

Donbeh-ye Olya (Persian: دنبه عليا, also Romanized as Donbeh-ye ‘Olyā; also known as Donbeh-ye Bālā) is a village in Meymand Rural District, in the Central District of Shahr-e Babak County, Kerman Province, Iran. At the 2006 census, its population was 73, in 14 families.
