= Askeran clash =

1988 riot and killing in Askeran, Azerbaijan SSR

The Askeran clash on 22—23 February 1988 in the town of Askeran was one of the starting points of Armenian-Azerbaijani conflict, which triggered the First Nagorno-Karabakh War. The Askeran clash was followed by the Sumgait pogroms.

== Background and clash ==
On 22 February, two days after the request of Karabakh National Council to transfer the region of Nagorno-Karabakh to Armenia, a crowd of Azerbaijanis surrounded the local Communist Party headquarters, demanding information about rumors of an Azerbaijani having been killed in Stepanakert. They were informed that no such incident had occurred, but refused to believe it. Dissatisfied with what they were told, thousands began marching toward Nagorno-Karabakh, “wreaking destruction en route.” The authorities mobilized roughly a thousand police to stop the riots; the result was a clash in the Askeran region of Nagorno-Karabakh that left two Azerbaijanis dead, 50 Armenian villagers, and an unknown number of Azerbaijanis and police injured.

On Azerbaijani Radio, deputy attorney general Katusev reported the fact that "two inhabitants of the Agdam district fell victim to murder", giving two Muslim surnames. These news, according to Tamara Dragadze, were announced to show the gravity of the conflict and to calm down sentiments.

The news of these clashes sparked the Sumgait pogrom against Armenian residents of the city of Sumgait on 27 February.

== See also ==
- Armenian-Azerbaijani War
