= Askeran =

Place in Nagorno-Karabakh

Askeran Ասկերան Əsgəran
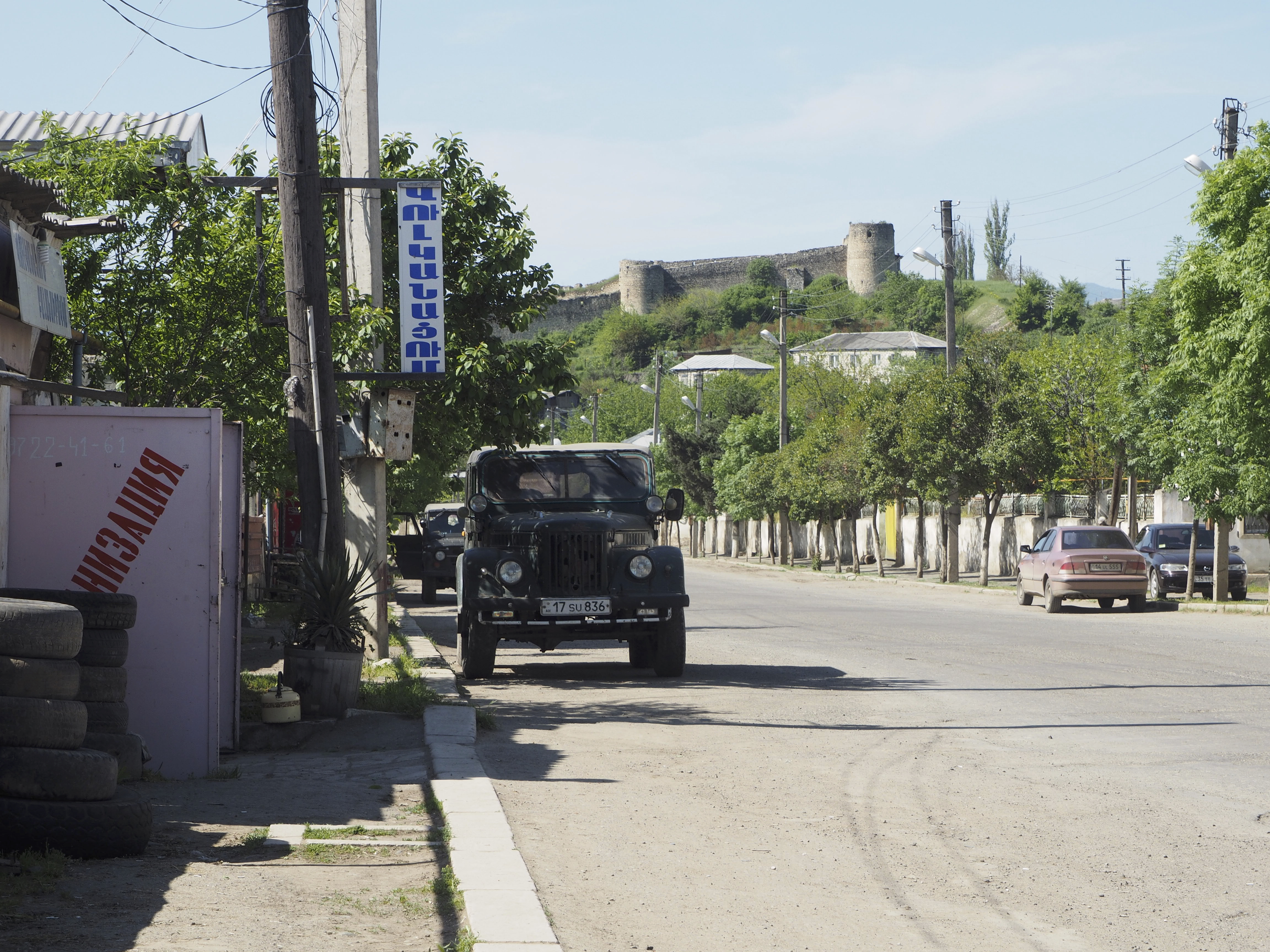

- Location within Azerbaijan Location within Karabakh Economic Region
- Coordinates: 39°56′12″N 46°49′58″E
- Country: Azerbaijan
- District: Khojaly
- Elevation: 512 m (1,680 ft)

Population (2015)
  - Total: 2,300
- Time zone: UTC+4 (AZT)

Askeran (Armenian: Ասկերան or Mayraberd, Մայրաբերդ; Azerbaijani: Əsgəran) is an Armenian town in the region of Nagorno-Karabakh, Azerbaijan. Until 2023 it was controlled by the breakaway Republic of Artsakh, as the centre of its Askeran Province. The town had an ethnic Armenian-majority population until the expulsion of the Armenian population of Nagorno-Karabakh by Azerbaijan following the 2023 Azerbaijani offensive in Nagorno-Karabakh. It is located on the left bank of the Karkar/Gargarchay River, approximately 11 kilometres (7 mi) northeast of the regional capital, Stepanakert.

== Etymology ==
Medieval Armenian sources attest to a settlement in the locale called Mayraberd (Armenian: Մայրաբերդ, lit. 'mother fortress'). The modern name Askeran (Armenian: Ասկերան, lit. 'military encampment') refers to the settlement's historic use from the beginning of the 18th century as an arsenal for various military powers.

== History ==
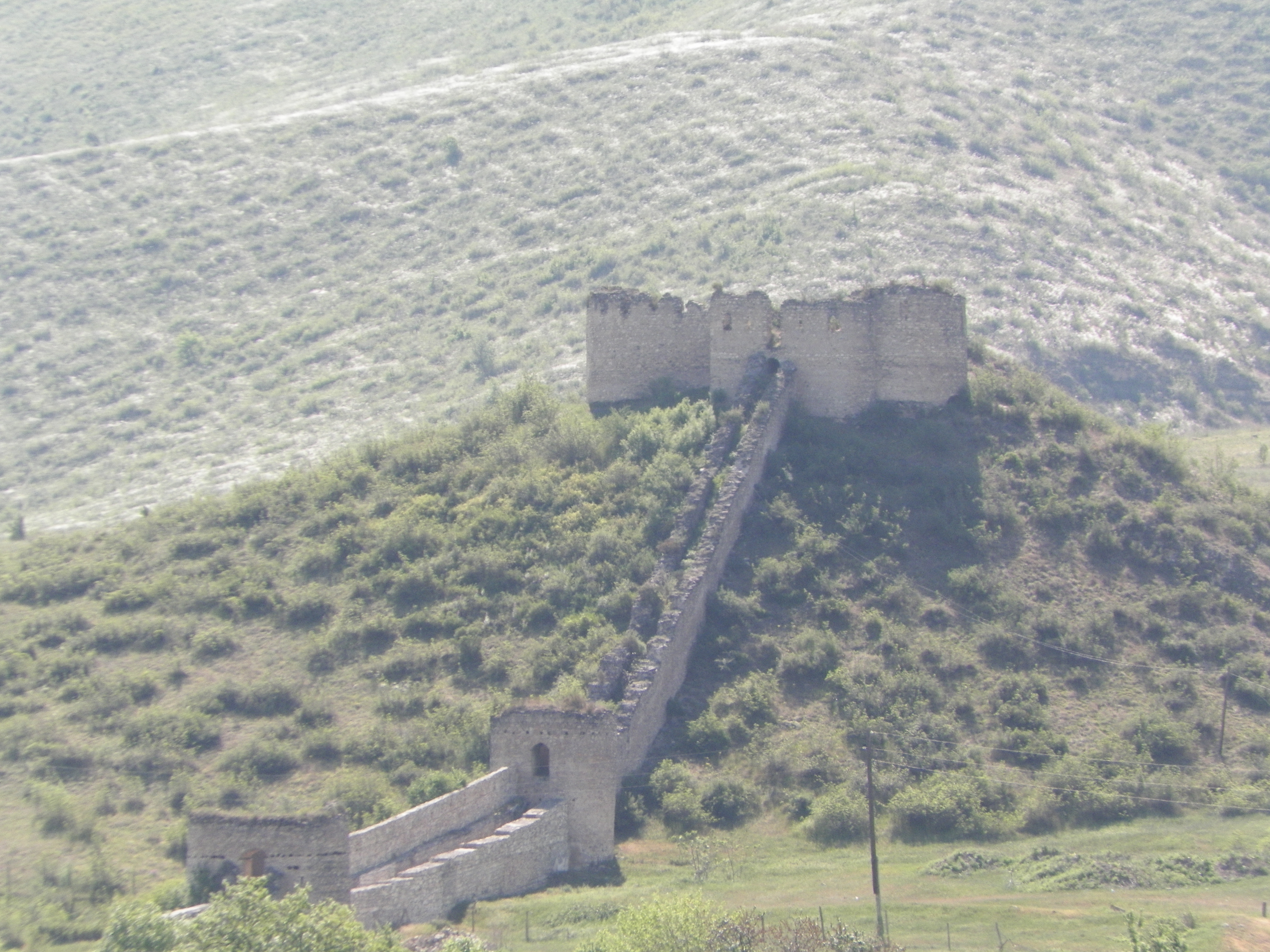
View of the Askeran Fortress

Askeran originally belonged to the historic territory of Dizak before becoming part of the Armenian Melikdom of Varanda in the first half of the 16th century. The Askeran fortress protected the eastern frontier of Varanda from the semi-autonomous Karabakh Khanate, which was under the suzerainty of Iran. The Askeran Fortress was built upon the foundations of the medieval Armenian village and fortress known as Mayraberd. In 1752, the melik (prince) of Varanda, Shahnazar II, made an alliance with the Karabakh khan Panah Ali Khan, who expanded the fortress to its current state. In July 1795, the Askeran fortress was captured by the forces of the Qajar shah (king) Agha Mohammad Khan Qajar (r. 1789–1797), who attempted to restore Iranian rule in the southeastern Caucasus.

During the Russo-Persian War of 1804–1813, the Russian encampment was near the fortress. In 1810, peace talks between Russia and Iran were conducted at the fortress. Restoration works on the fortress began in 2018. The fortress is situated in the southern part of the town.

In the Russian Empire, Askeran was part of the Shusha Uyezd in the Elisabethpol Governorate. During the Soviet period, the city was the administrative center of the Askeran District, which was a part of the Nagorno-Karabakh Autonomous Oblast in the Azerbaijan SSR.

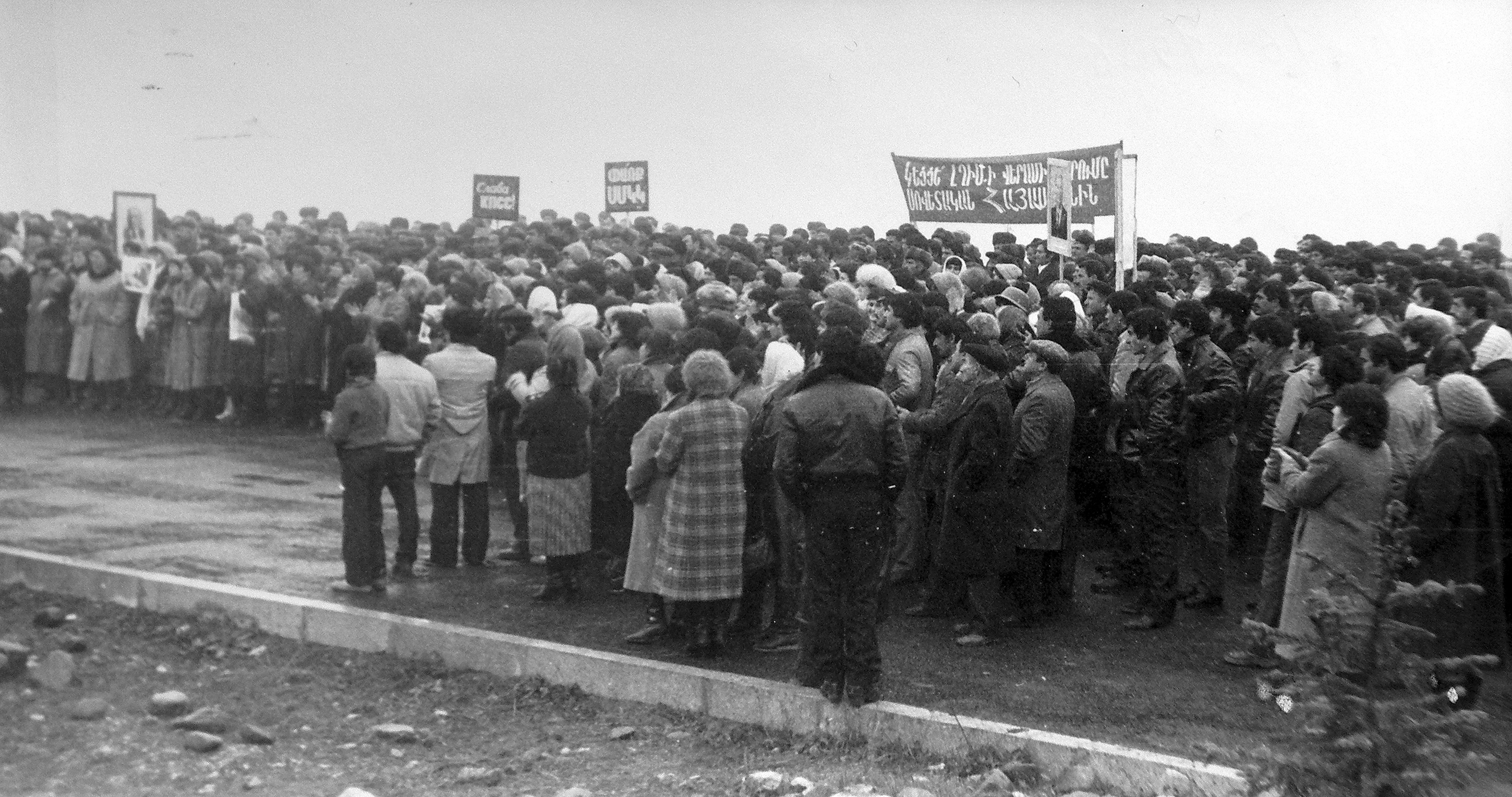
1988 Armenian protest in Askeran during the Karabakh movement

Askeran was the site of one of the starting points of the Nagorno-Karabakh conflict in 1988, the Askeran clash. On 22 February 1988, a crowd of angry Azerbaijanis marched from Agdam in the direction of Stepanakert and clashed with police and local Armenians in Askeran, ending in the death of two Azerbaijanis and injuries on both sides. The town was known as an Armenian stronghold during the war. In 1991, it became the center of the Askeran Province of the Republic of Artsakh following the First Nagorno-Karabakh War. Askeran came under Azerbaijani control on 24 September 2023, after the 2023 Azerbaijani offensive in Nagorno-Karabakh and the flight of the Armenian population.

== Historical heritage sites ==
Historical heritage sites in and around Askeran include the 18th-century Askeran Fortress, the cave-shrine of Hatsut (Armenian: Հացուտ), and the church of Surb Astvatsatsin (Armenian: Սուրբ Աստվածածին, lit. 'Holy Mother of God') built in 2002.

== Economy and culture ==
The population is engaged in agriculture, horticulture, animal husbandry as well as in different state institutions and other private enterprises. The city is home to factories producing wine, brandy and non-alcoholic drinks, as well as architectural enterprises, secondary and musical schools, a house of culture, a municipal building, a kindergarten, and a hospital. The community of Askeran includes the village of Kyatuk.

== Demographics ==
In the census of 1933, 222 people divided into 48 households were recorded in the village, all of whom were Armenians. Until 2023, Askeran was mostly populated by ethnic Armenians. with around 700 inhabitants in 1970, 1,967 inhabitants in 2005 and 2,300 inhabitants in 2015.

== Climate ==
Askeran has a temperate and mild Humid subtropical climate (Cfa) according to the Köppen climate classification.

Climate data for Askeran
Month	Jan	Feb	Mar	Apr	May	Jun	Jul	Aug	Sep	Oct	Nov	Dec	Year
Mean daily maximum °C (°F)	4.9 (40.8)	5.9 (42.6)	10 (50)	14.3 (57.7)	19 (66)	23.7 (74.7)	27 (81)	27.3 (81.1)	21.9 (71.4)	16.4 (61.5)	10.5 (50.9)	6.6 (43.9)	15.6 (60.1)
Mean daily minimum °C (°F)	−6.5 (20.3)	−5.1 (22.8)	−1 (30)	3.9 (39.0)	9.3 (48.7)	13.4 (56.1)	16.3 (61.3)	16.5 (61.7)	12.7 (54.9)	7.5 (45.5)	0.5 (32.9)	−4.9 (23.2)	5.2 (41.4)
Average precipitation mm (inches)	37 (1.5)	53 (2.1)	93 (3.7)	107 (4.2)	121 (4.8)	79 (3.1)	32 (1.3)	35 (1.4)	80 (3.1)	81 (3.2)	55 (2.2)	37 (1.5)	810 (32.1)
Source: https://en.climate-data.org/asia/azerbaijan/askeran/askeran-21908/

== Gallery ==
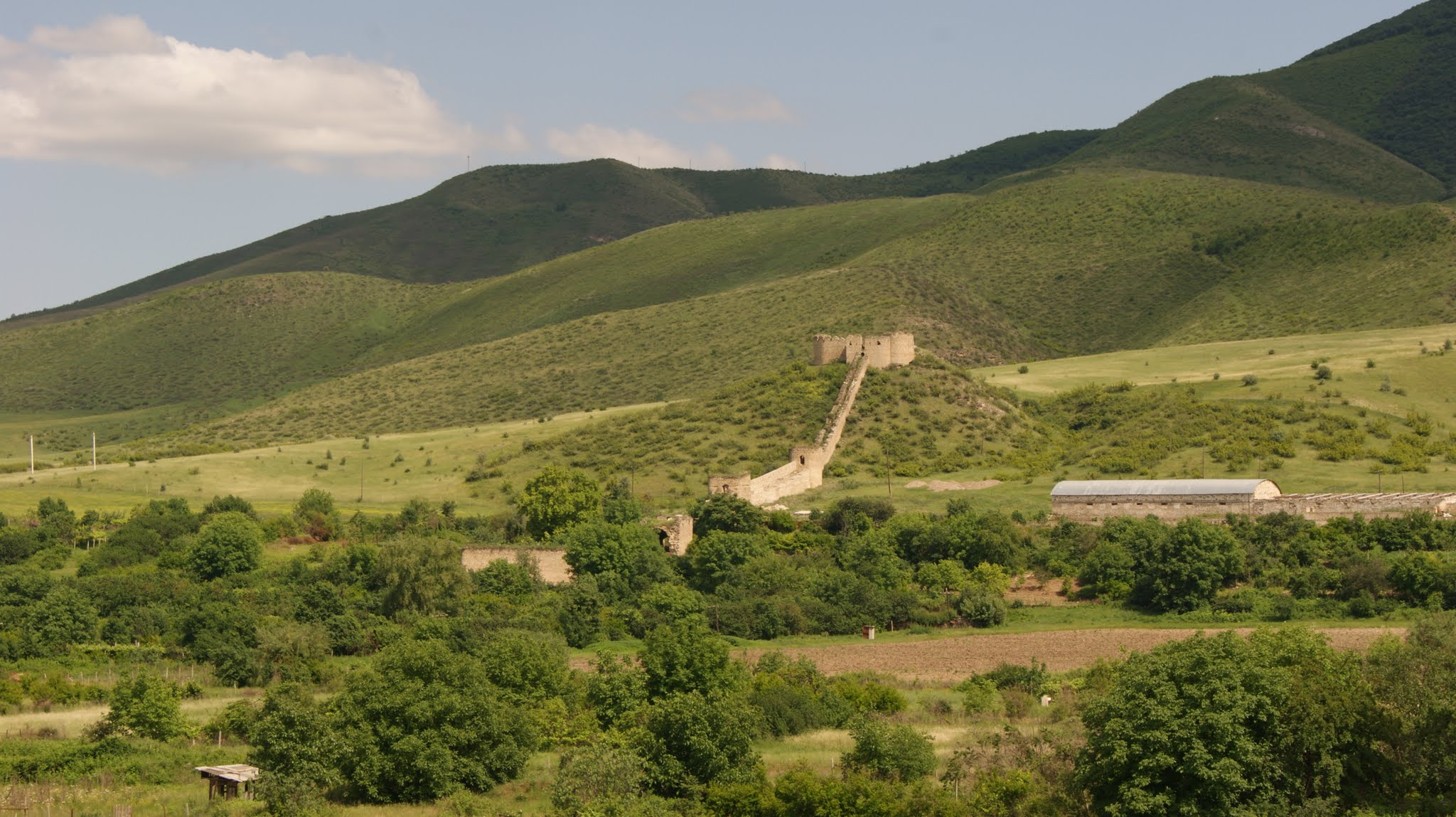
Askeran Fortress

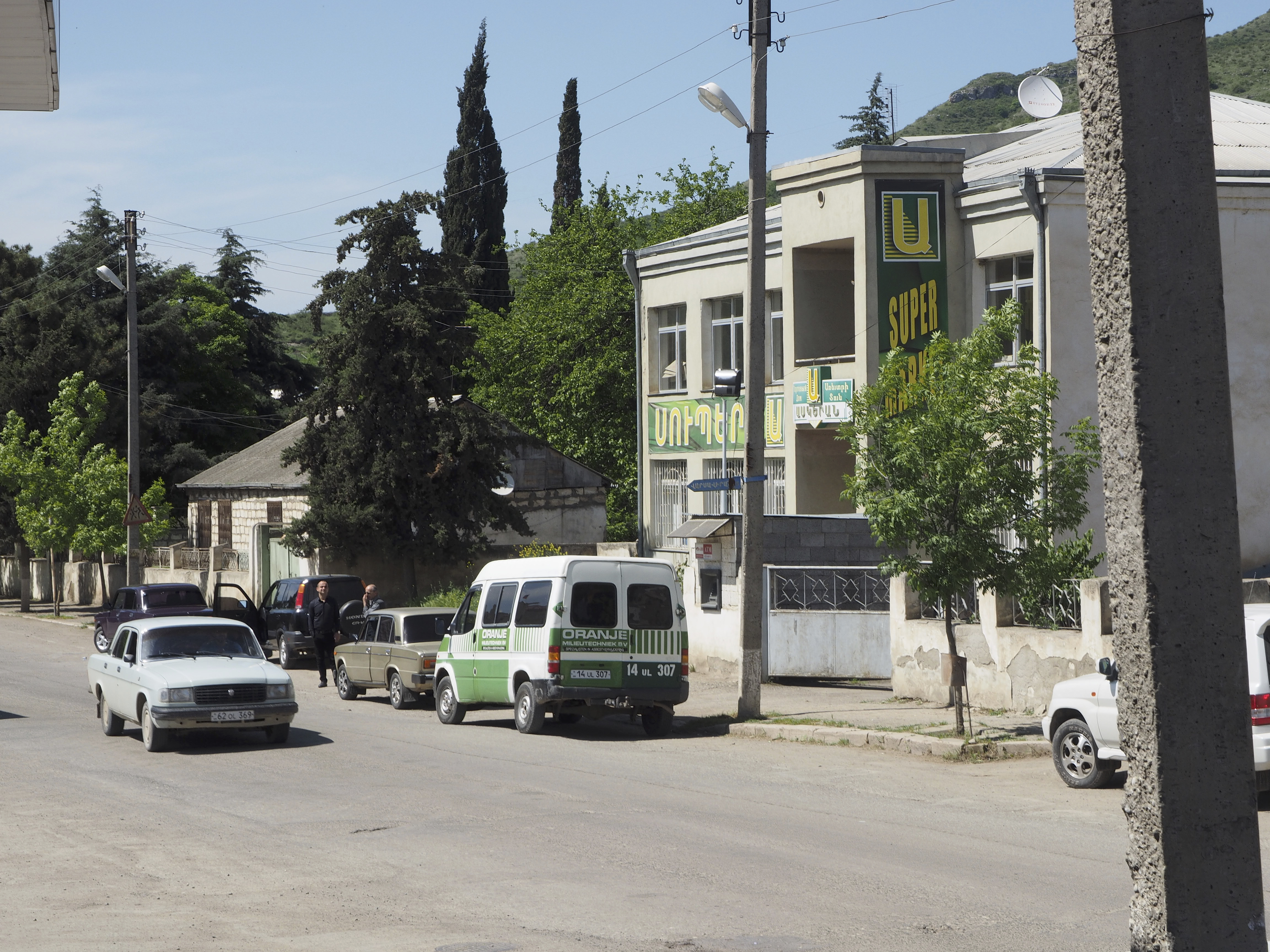
Street in Askeran

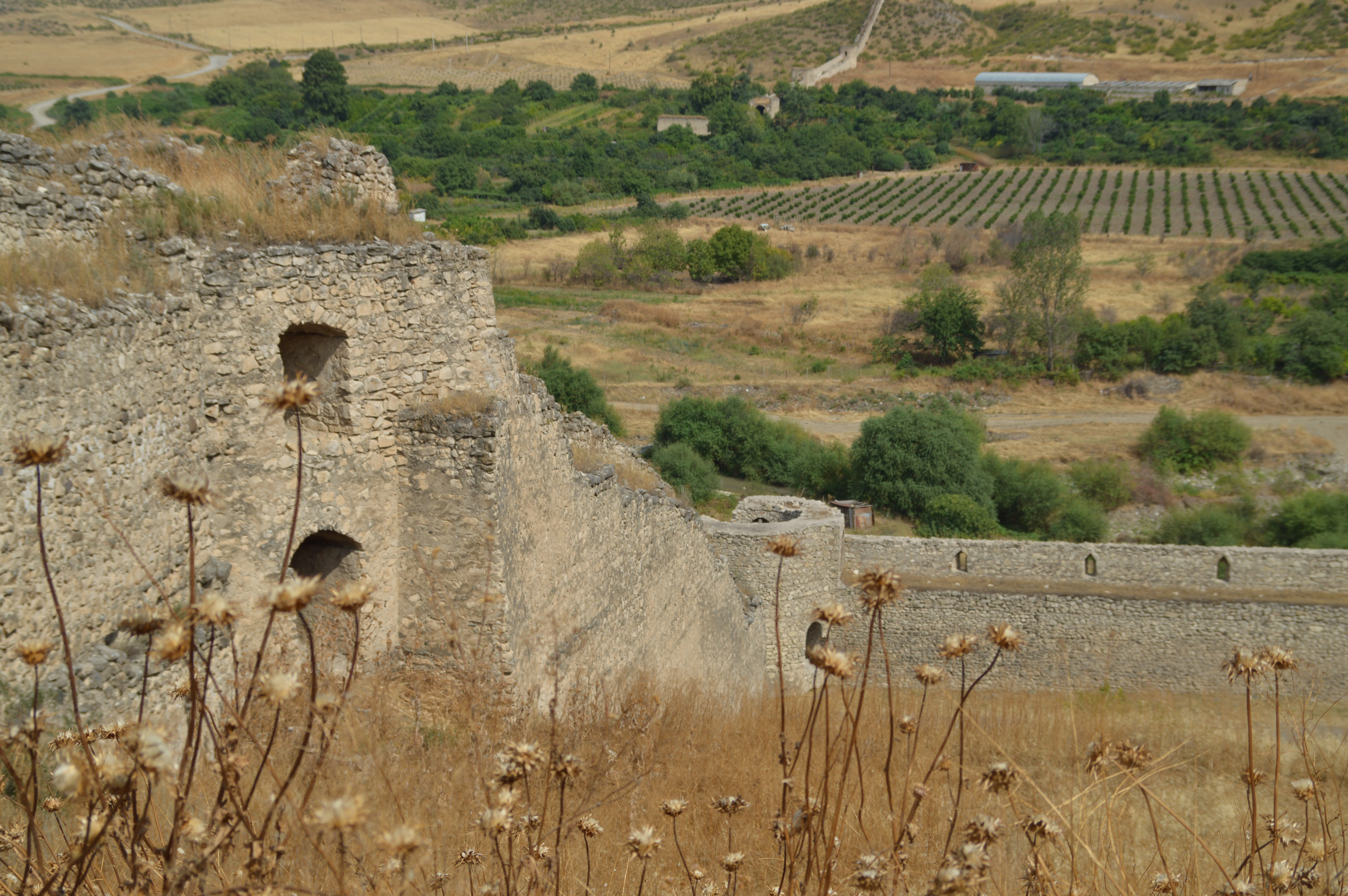
Walls of the Askeran Fortress

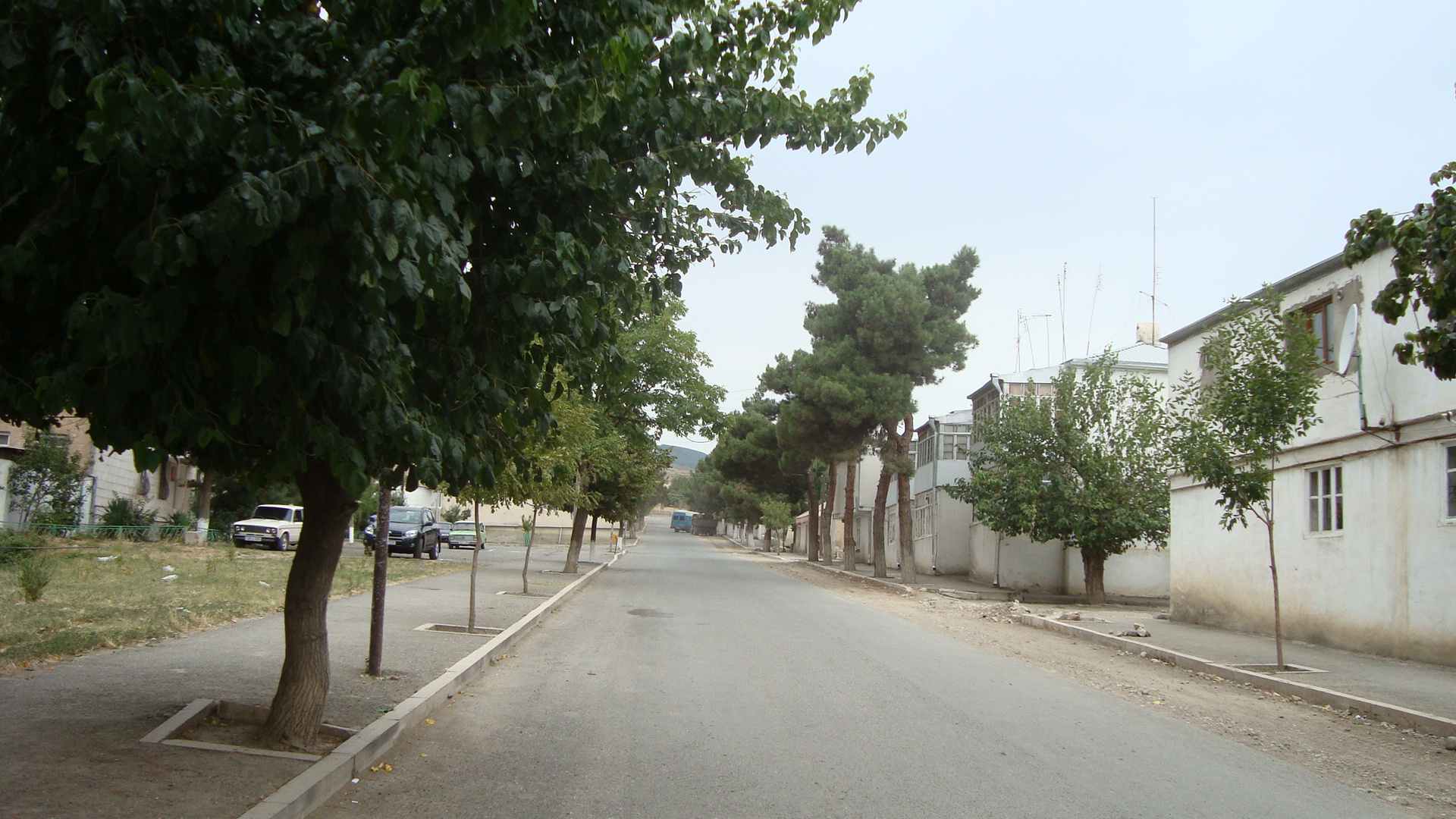
Street

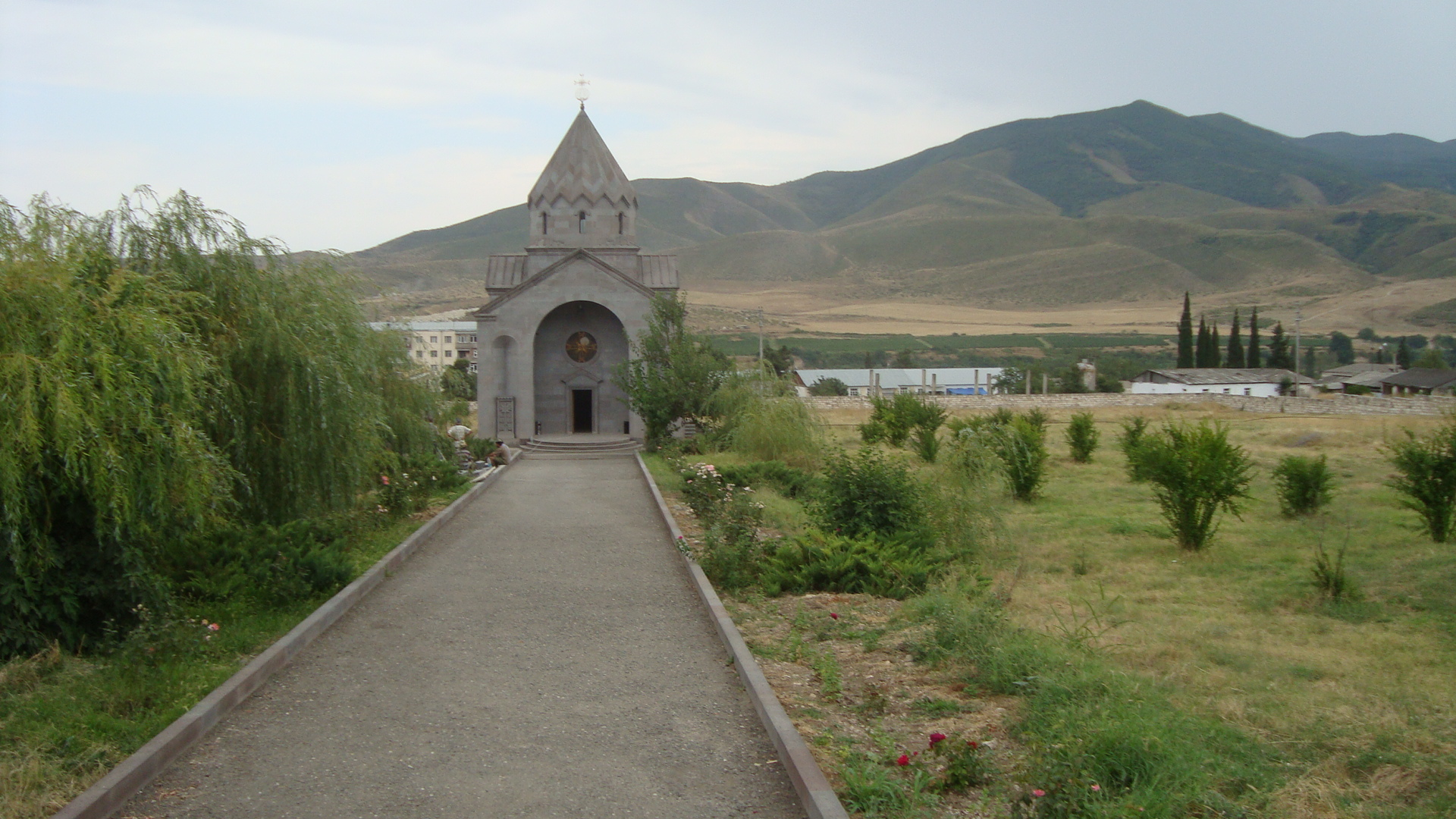
St. Astvatsatsin Church (Church of the Holy Mother of God) in Askeran, opened in 2002

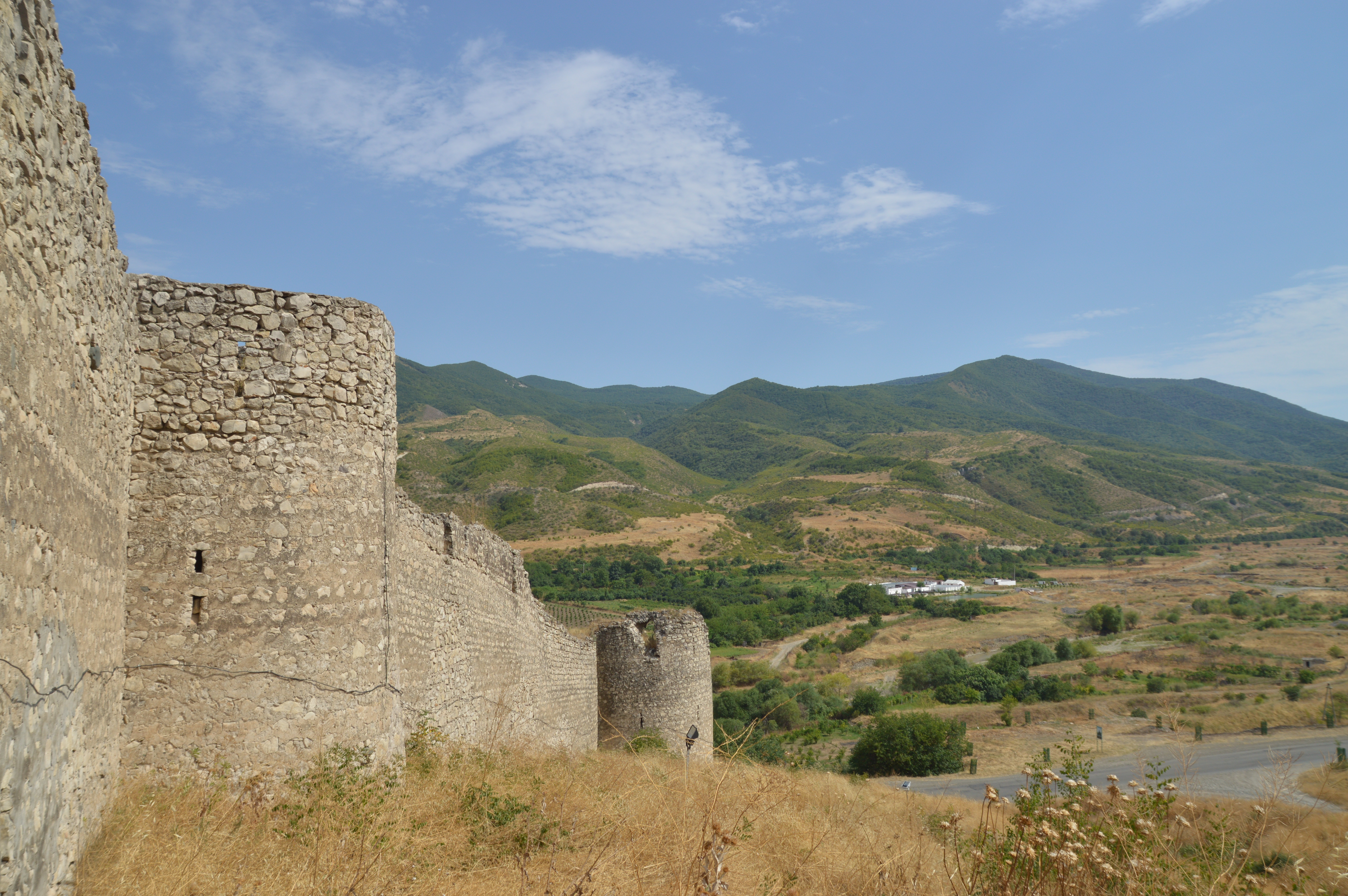
Scenery

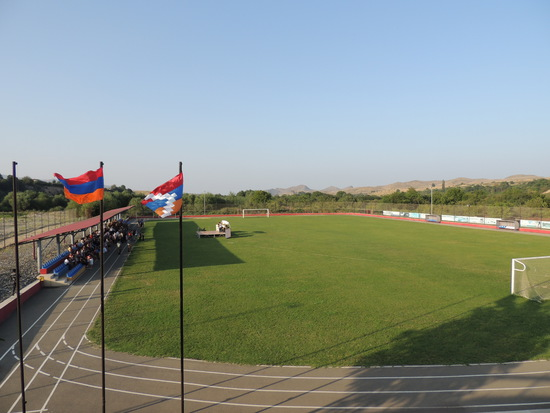
Askeran City Stadium

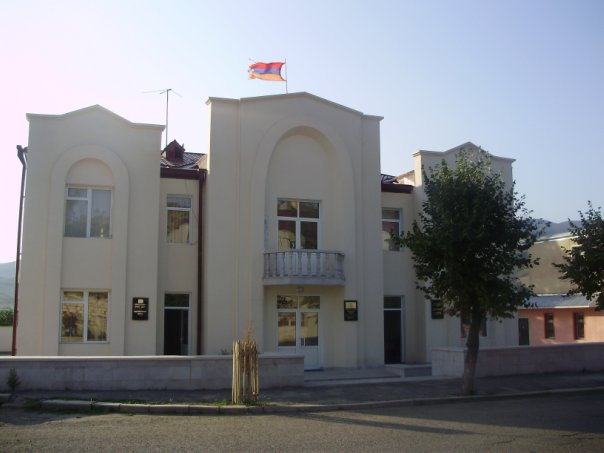
District court in Askeran

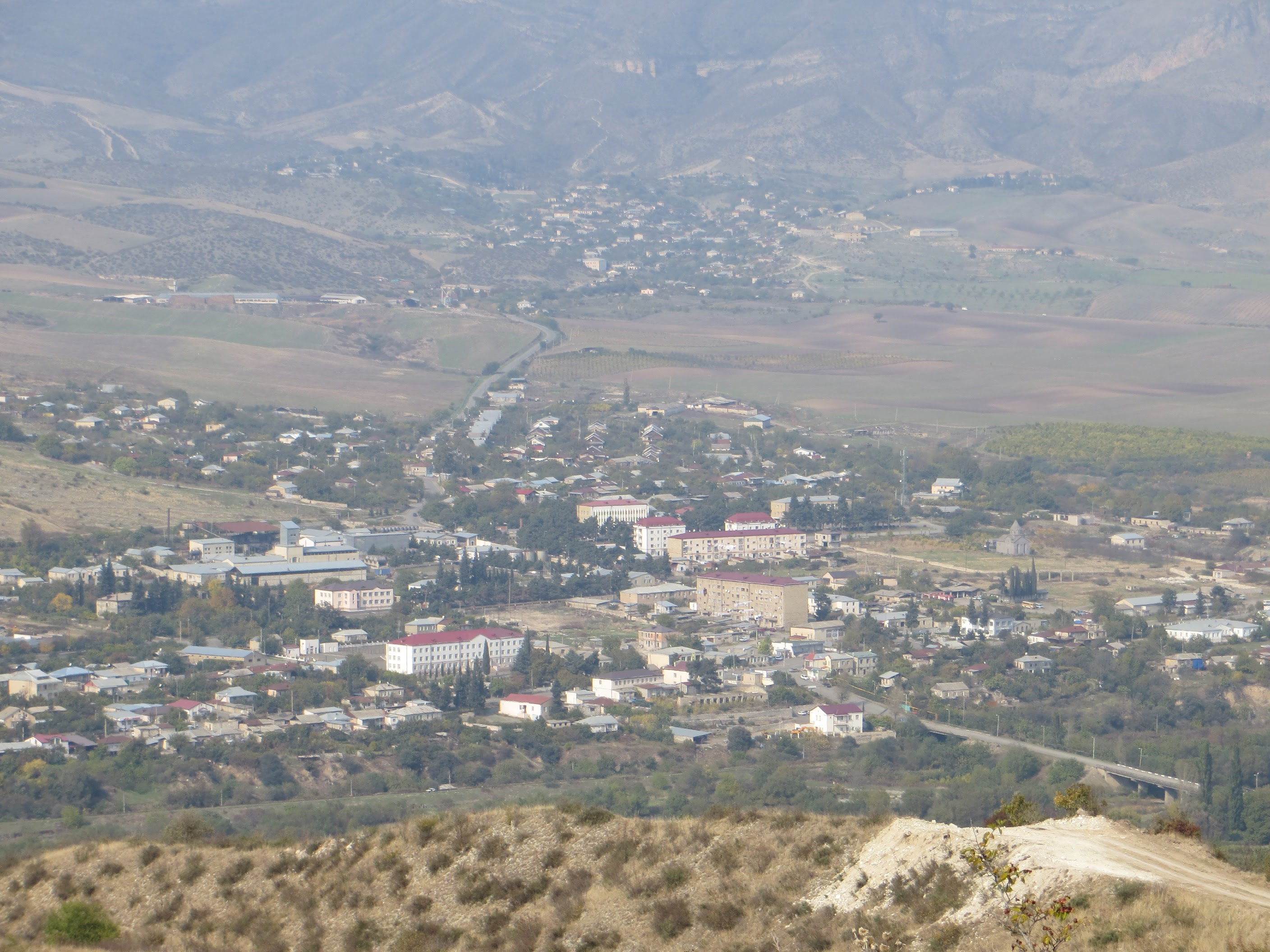
View of Askeran from road leading up to Kyatuk

== Sources ==
- Behrooz, Maziar (2023). Iran at War: Interactions with the Modern World and the Struggle with Imperial Russia. I.B. Tauris. ISBN 978-0-7556-3737-9.
- Bournoutian, George (1994). A History of Qarabagh: An Annotated Translation of Mirza Jamal Javanshir Qarabaghi's Tarikh-e Qarabagh. Mazda Publishers. ISBN 978-1-56859-011-0.
- Bournoutian, George (2016a). "Prelude to War: The Russian Siege and Storming of the Fortress of Ganjeh, 1803–4". Iranian Studies. 50 (1). Taylor & Francis: 107–124. doi:10.1080/00210862.2016.1159779. S2CID 163302882.
- Bournoutian, George (2016b). The 1820 Russian Survey of the Khanate of Shirvan: A Primary Source on the Demography and Economy of an Iranian Province prior to its Annexation by Russia. Gibb Memorial Trust. ISBN 978-1-909724-80-8.
- Bournoutian, George (2021). From the Kur to the Aras: A Military History of Russia's Move into the South Caucasus and the First Russo-Iranian War, 1801–1813. Brill. ISBN 978-90-04-44515-4.
- Ekbal, Kamran (2002). "ʿAskarān". Encyclopaedia Iranica.
- Hakobyan, T. Kh.; Melik-Bakhshyan, St. T.; Barseghyan, H. Kh. (1986). "Ասկերան" [Askaran]. Հայաստանի և հարակից շրջանների տեղանունների բառարան [Dictionary of Toponymy of Armenia and Adjacent Territories] (in Armenian). Vol. V. Armenia: Yerevan State University Publishing House. p. 336.
- Hambly, Gavin R. G. (1991). "Iran during the reigns of Fath 'Alī Shāh and Muhammad Shāh". In Avery, Peter; Hambly, Gavin R. G.; Melville, Charles Peter (eds.). The Cambridge History of Iran: From Nadir Shah to the Islamic Republic. Vol. 7. Cambridge: Cambridge University Press. pp. 144–173. ISBN 0-521-20095-4.
- Hewsen, Robert H. (1972). "The Meliks of Eastern Armenia: A Preliminary Study". Revue des Études Arméniennes. Nouvelle série. IX: 285–329.
- Mkrtchyan, Shahen [in Armenian] (1988). Ulubabyan, Bagrat (ed.). Historical and Architectural Monuments of Nagorno-Karabakh (PDF). Yerevan: Parberakan. pp. 161–162. ISBN 5-540-00402-7.
