= Esfand =

- Native name: اسفند (Persian); حوت (Dari); Reşemeh (Kurdish); Исфанд / Ҳут (Tajik)
- Calendar: Solar Hijri calendar
- Month number: 12
- Number of days: 29 (Common Years) or 30 (Leap Years)
- Season: Winter
- Gregorian equivalent: February–March

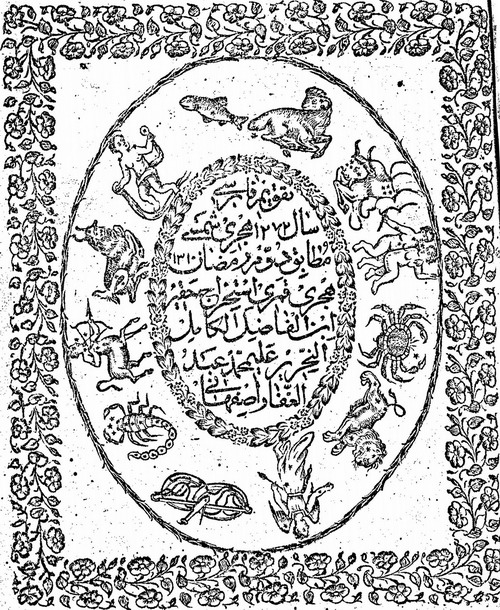
Solar Hijri calendar: Cover of Najm al-Dawlah Isfahani's Persian Almanac.

Esfand (Persian: اسفند, Persian pronunciation: [esˈfænd]) is the twelfth and final month of the Solar Hijri calendar, the official calendar of Iran and Afghanistan. Esfand has twenty-nine days normally, and thirty during leap years. It begins in February and ends in March of the Gregorian calendar. Esfand corresponds to the zodiac sign of Pisces.

Esfand is the third and last month of the winter season (Zemestan), and is followed by Farvardin.

== Events ==
- 28 - 1292 - The first Stanley Cup Final in hockey history concludes with the victory of the Toronto Hockey Club, champion team of the National Hockey Association (NHA) against the Victoria Aristocrats, champions of the Pacific Coast Hockey Association (PCHA).
- 26 - 1316 - Anschluss of Austria into Germany
- 13 - 1328 - The 1951 Asian Games Opening Ceremony is held in New Delhi, India, the first in Asian Games history.
- 3 - 1366 - Askeran riots in the USSR - beginning of the Nagorno-Karabakh conflict
- 29 - 1373 - Tokyo subway sarin attack
- 12 - 1384 - 2006 World Baseball Classic, the first edition of modern international baseball tournament, opens
- 20 - 1389 - Japanese earthquake - Fukushima disaster
- 5 - 1400 - 2022 Russian invasion of Ukraine begins
- 9 - 1404 - Operation Epic Fury begins

== Observances ==
- 5 Esfand: Sepandārmazgān
- 5-6 Esfand: Defender of the Fatherland Day and National Day of Brunei
- 6-7 Esfand: Independence Day (Estonia)
- 7-10/11 Esfand: Ayyam-i-Há
- 12-13 Esfand: Liberation Day (Bulgaria)
- 15 Esfand: Arbor Day in Iran This date, which typically starts on March 5, starts Natural Recyclable Resources Week, ending on March 12.
- 17-18 Esfand: International Women's Day
- 26-27 Esfand: St. Patrick's Day
- 28-29 Esfand: Saint Joseph's Day
- Last Tuesday of Esfand: Chaharshanbe Suri

=== Movable observances and festivals ===
- Lantern Festival: Held 15 days following the Chinese New Year, date falls on first or second week of this month
- Frawardigan: Held 19-29 Esfand in normal years, and 20-30 Esfand in leap years, Zoroastrian period of remembrance of the dead

== Births ==
- 24 Esfand is the Reza shah birthday.
- 26 - 1323 - Homeyra

== Deaths ==
- 16 - 1391 - Hugo Chávez, President of Venezuela from 1999 CE until his death in 2013 CE
- 17 - 1308 - William Howard Taft, Chief Justice and 27th President of the United States
- 18 - 1390 - Simin Daneshvar, Academic, novelist, fiction writer and translator
- 9 - 1404 - Ali Khamenei, 2nd Supreme Leader of Iran
