= District 6, Isfahan =

District 6, Isfahan منطقه شش شهرداری اصفهان - منطقه 6
- Coordinates: 32.62176°N 51.667414°E
- Region: Isfahan

Area
  - Land: 1,255 ha (3,101 acres)

District 6 is an area of 6600 hectare in the southeastern part of Isfahan. Of the district a section is militarized Fourth Isfahan base for IRGC پایگاه چهارم رزمی عمومی اصفهان. There are 68 mosques, seven libraries, seven swimming pools, eight parks, twelve gymnasiums and two Zurkhanehs.

== Amenities ==
The municipal district manages Pardis Honar Park, Ruhulamin forest park, Takhte foulad cemetery, Shahid Keshvari pardis, Malek caravanserai, Abshar neighborhood, Zeitoon shahrak greenspace, and Imam Khamenei International Convention Center

The municipality has renovated Denart dovecote in this district.
