= District 5, Isfahan =

Coordinates: 32.622997°N 51.653639°E

- Interactive map of District 5, Isfahan

Area
  - Total: 1,702 ha (4,210 acres)

District 5 is a district in the Iranian city of Isfahan. It was part of region 2 until 1971. The district has the administration of Sepahan Shahr and Mount Sofeh. 28 percent of the district is militarized.

It is one of the more developed parts of the city and important for tourism. District 13 was created out of part of this district in 2001.

This municipality manages New Julfa.

Universities in this district include: Isfahan University, Isfahan University of Medical Sciences, Art university of Isfahan, Mohajer Technical And Vocational College of Isfahan, Sepah University of Military Sciences and Technology.

Photovoltaics solar cells panels are used in municipality building rooftops.

== Amenities ==
Forty five mosques are in the district, along with 6 cultural buildings and libraries, seven swimming pools, eleven gymnasiums, and six parks.

== Sites ==
- Khaqani blvd
- Hezar Jarib Boulevard
- Nazar street
- Tohid
- Vahid
- 55th and 44th artillery group base Iranian Army Land Forces (formerly King's Farah Abad garrison)
- Sichan - a former village
- Baq Zeresh garden there was an imperial palace
- Mahale Bagh Daryache neighborhood
