= Sharafshah =

Sharafshah شرف شاه
- Village
- Location within Iran
- Coordinates: 33°54′20″N 45°49′55″E
- Country: Iran
- Province: Kermanshah
- County: Qasr-e Shirin
- Bakhsh: Sumar
- Rural District: Sumar

Population (2006)
  - Total: 9
- Time zone: UTC+3:30 (IRST)
  - Summer (DST): UTC+4:30 (IRDT)

Sharafshah (Persian: شرف شاه, also Romanized as Sharafshāh) is a village in Sumar Rural District, Sumar District, Qasr-e Shirin County, Kermanshah Province, Iran. At the 2006 census, its population was 9, in 6 families.
