= Nasrabad-e Pasha =

Nasrabad-e Pasha نصرابادپاشا
- Village
- Location within Iran
- Coordinates: 34°30′37″N 45°35′01″E
- Country: Iran
- Province: Kermanshah
- County: Qasr-e Shirin
- Bakhsh: Central
- Rural District: Fathabad

Population (2006)
  - Total: 89
- Time zone: UTC+3:30 (IRST)
  - Summer (DST): UTC+4:30 (IRDT)

Nasrabad-e Pasha (Persian: نصرابادپاشا, also Romanized as Naşrābād-e Pāshā; also known as Naşrābād) is a village in Fathabad Rural District, in the Central District of Qasr-e Shirin County, Kermanshah Province, Iran. At the 2006 census, its population was 89, in 19 families.
