= Nasrabad-e Seyyed Khalil =

Nasrabad-e Seyyed Khalil نصراباد سيدخليل
- Village
- Location within Iran
- Coordinates: 34°31′17″N 45°38′48″E
- Country: Iran
- Province: Kermanshah
- County: Qasr-e Shirin
- Bakhsh: Central
- Rural District: Fathabad

Population (2006)
  - Total: 258
- Time zone: UTC+3:30 (IRST)
  - Summer (DST): UTC+4:30 (IRDT)

Nasrabad-e Seyyed Khalil (Persian: نصراباد سيدخليل, also Romanized as Naṣrābād-e Seyyed Khalīl; also known as Seyyed Khalīl) is a village in Fathabad Rural District, in the Central District of Qasr-e Shirin County, Kermanshah Province, Iran. At the 2006 census, its population was 258, in 65 families.
