= Sumar =

Sumar may refer to:

- Sumar, Iran, a city in Iran
- Sumar District, an administrative subdivision of Iran
- Sumar Rural District, an administrative subdivision of Iran
- Sumar, Netherlands, a village in the northern Netherlands
- Sumar (electoral alliance), a Spanish electoral platform
- Sumar (political party), a Spanish political party
- Soumar (missile), Another spelling of Sumar. an Iranian long-range cruise missile
