= Seyyed Said =

Seyyed Said سيد سعيد
- Village
- Location within Iran
- Coordinates: 34°28′27″N 45°35′17″E
- Country: Iran
- Province: Kermanshah
- County: Qasr-e Shirin
- Bakhsh: Central
- Rural District: Nasrabad

Population (2006)
  - Total: 261
- Time zone: UTC+3:30 (IRST)
  - Summer (DST): UTC+4:30 (IRDT)

Seyyed Said (Persian: سيد سعيد, also Romanized as Seyyed Sa‘īd; also known as Seyyed Asadollāh and Tappeh Qabrestān) is a village in Nasrabad Rural District (Kermanshah Province), in the Central District of Qasr-e Shirin County, Kermanshah Province, Iran. At the 2006 census, its population was 261, in 71 families. The village is populated by Kurds.
