= Kalantar, Kermanshah =

Kalantar كلانتر
- Village
- Location within Iran
- Coordinates: 34°30′23″N 45°40′52″E
- Country: Iran
- Province: Kermanshah
- County: Qasr-e Shirin
- Bakhsh: Central
- Rural District: Fathabad

Population (2006)
  - Total: 93
- Time zone: UTC+3:30 (IRST)
  - Summer (DST): UTC+4:30 (IRDT)

Kalantar (Persian: كلانتر, also Romanized as Kalāntar; also known as Ebrāhīm-e Kalāntar and Qalāntar) is a village in Fathabad Rural District, in the Central District of Qasr-e Shirin County, Kermanshah Province, Iran. At the 2006 census, its population was 93, in 26 families.
