= Hajji Fattah-e Beg =

Hajji Fattah-e Beg حاجي فتاح بگ
- Village
- Location within Iran
- Coordinates: 34°28′10″N 45°46′30″E
- Country: Iran
- Province: Kermanshah
- County: Qasr-e Shirin
- Bakhsh: Central
- Rural District: Fathabad

Population (2006)
  - Total: 155
- Time zone: UTC+3:30 (IRST)
  - Summer (DST): UTC+4:30 (IRDT)

Hajji Fattah-e Beg (Persian: حاجي فتاح بگ, also Romanized as Hājjī Fattāh-e Beg) is a village in Fathabad Rural District, in the Central District of Qasr-e Shirin County, Kermanshah Province, Iran. At the 2006 census, its population was 155, in 39 families.
