= Barreh Bu Anjirban =

Barreh Bu Anjirban بره بورانجيربان
- Village
- Location within Iran
- Coordinates: 34°24′25″N 45°39′43″E
- Country: Iran
- Province: Kermanshah
- County: Qasr-e Shirin
- Bakhsh: Central
- Rural District: Nasrabad

Population (2006)
  - Total: 52
- Time zone: UTC+3:30 (IRST)
  - Summer (DST): UTC+4:30 (IRDT)

Barreh Bu Anjirban (Persian: بره بورانجيربان, also Romanized as Barreh Bū Anjīrīān) is a village in Nasrabad Rural District (Kermanshah Province), in the Central District of Qasr-e Shirin County, Kermanshah Province, Iran. At the 2006 census, its population was 52, in 10 families. The village is populated by Kurds.
