= Dar Balut, Qasr-e Shirin =

Dar Balut داربلوط
- Village
- Location within Iran
- Coordinates: 34°27′49″N 45°46′34″E
- Country: Iran
- Province: Kermanshah
- County: Qasr-e Shirin
- Bakhsh: Central
- Rural District: Fathabad

Population (2006)
  - Total: 135
- Time zone: UTC+3:30 (IRST)
  - Summer (DST): UTC+4:30 (IRDT)

Dar Balut (Persian: داربلوط, also Romanized as Dār Balūţ) is a village in Fathabad Rural District, in the Central District of Qasr-e Shirin County, Kermanshah Province, Iran. At the 2006 census, its population was 135, in 33 families.
