= Garraveh =

Garraveh or Garaveh (Persian: گراوه) may refer to:

- Garraveh 1, Kermanshah Province
- Garraveh 2, Kermanshah Province
- Garaveh, Kurdistan
