= Shirin Ab, Kermanshah =

Shirin Ab شيرين اب
- Village
- Location within Iran
- Coordinates: 34°28′44″N 45°45′37″E
- Country: Iran
- Province: Kermanshah
- County: Qasr-e Shirin
- Bakhsh: Central
- Rural District: Fathabad

Population (2006)
  - Total: 238
- Time zone: UTC+3:30 (IRST)
  - Summer (DST): UTC+4:30 (IRDT)

Shirin Ab (Persian: شيرين اب, also Romanized as Shīrīn Āb; also known as Shīrīn Āb-e Ghazāl Khānom) is a village in Fathabad Rural District, in the Central District of Qasr-e Shirin County, Kermanshah Province, Iran. At the 2006 census, its population was 238, in 58 families.
