= Seyyed Ayaz =

Village in Kermanshah province, Iran

Seyyed Ayaz Persian: سيداياز
- Village
- Location within Iran
- Coordinates: 34°31′20″N 45°39′31″E
- Country: Iran
- Province: Kermanshah
- County: Qasr-e Shirin
- District: Central
- Rural District: Fathabad

Population (2016)
  - Total: 406
- Time zone: UTC+3:30 (IRST)

Seyyed Ayaz (Persian: سيداياز) (Note: Also romanized as Seyyed Ayāz) is a village in Fathabad Rural District of the Central District of Qasr-e Shirin County, Kermanshah province, Iran.

== Demographics ==
=== Population ===
At the time of the 2006 National Census, the village's population was 412 in 112 households, when it was in Nasrabad Rural District. The following census in 2011 counted 413 people in 118 households, by which time the village had been transferred to Fathabad Rural District. The 2016 census measured the population of the village as 406 people in 130 households. It was the most populous village in its rural district.
