= Barfi Kushkarri =

Barfi Kushkarri برفي كوشكري
- Village
- Location within Iran
- Coordinates: 34°29′06″N 45°43′16″E
- Country: Iran
- Province: Kermanshah
- County: Qasr-e Shirin
- Bakhsh: Central
- Rural District: Fathabad

Population (2006)
  - Total: 232
- Time zone: UTC+3:30 (IRST)
  - Summer (DST): UTC+4:30 (IRDT)

Barfi Kushkarri (Persian: برفي كوشكري, also Romanized as Barfī Kūshkarrī; also known as Barfī Gūshkarrī, Jegarlū Gūsh Kanīsh, and Jegarlū Gūsh Karīz) is a village in Fathabad Rural District, in the Central District of Qasr-e Shirin County, Kermanshah Province, Iran. At the 2006 census, its population was 232, in 52 families.
