= Nasrabad Seyyed Hatam =

Nasrabad Seyyed Hatam نصراباد سيدحاتم
- Village
- Location within Iran
- Coordinates: 34°28′48″N 45°45′14″E
- Country: Iran
- Province: Kermanshah
- County: Qasr-e Shirin
- Bakhsh: Central
- Rural District: Fathabad

Population (2006)
  - Total: 197
- Time zone: UTC+3:30 (IRST)
  - Summer (DST): UTC+4:30 (IRDT)

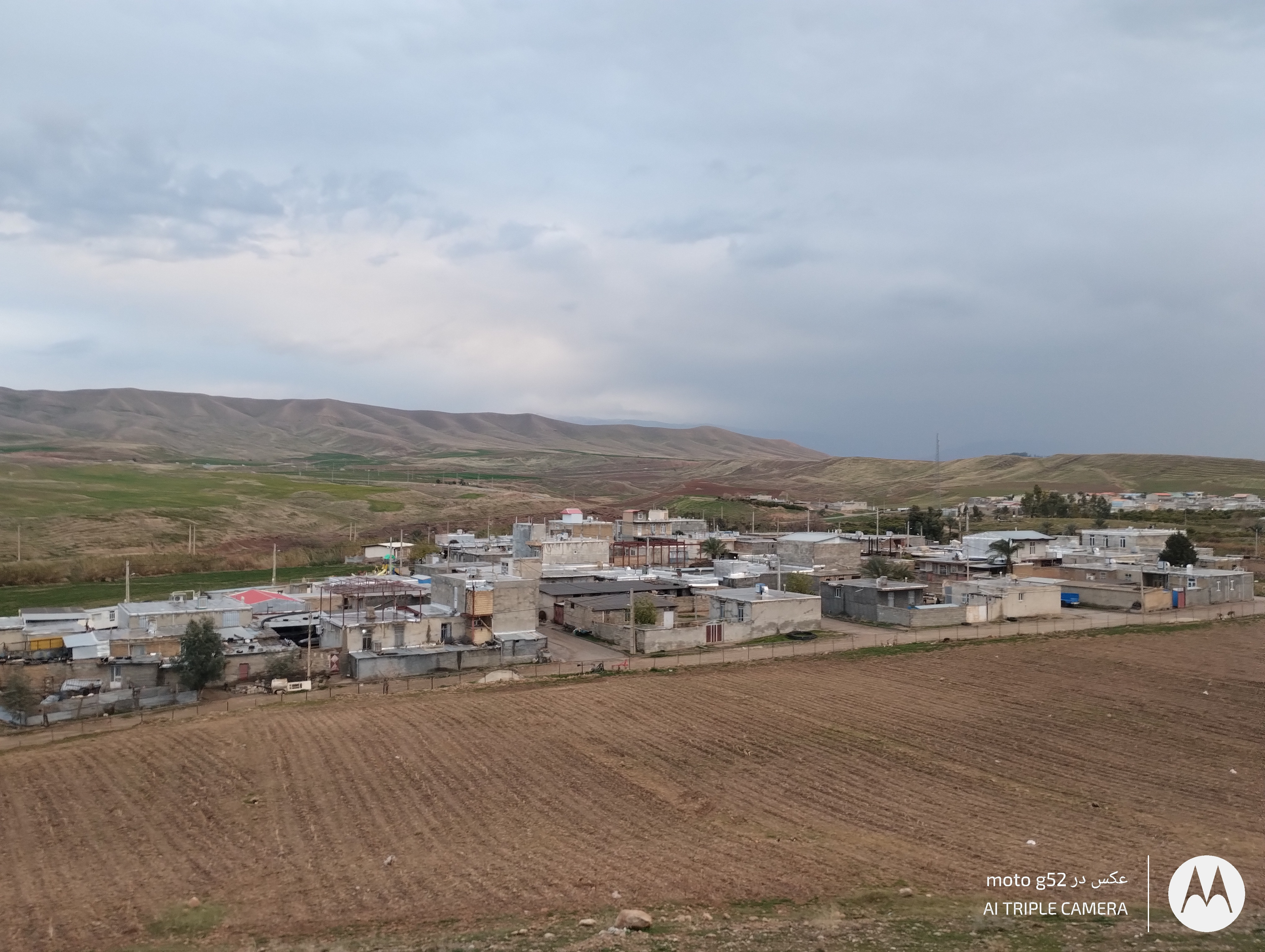
Nasrabad Seyyed Hatam in 2024

Nasrabad Seyyed Hatam (Persian: نصراباد سيدحاتم, also Romanized as Naşrābād Seyyed Ḩātam; also known as Naşrābād Seyyed) is a village in Fathabad Rural District, in the Central District of Qasr-e Shirin County, Kermanshah Province, Iran. At the 2006 census, its population was 197, in 41 families.
