= Nasrabad-e Seyyed Ahmad =

Nasrabad-e Seyyed Ahmad نصرابادسيداحمد
- Village
- Location within Iran
- Coordinates: 34°30′14″N 45°41′02″E
- Country: Iran
- Province: Kermanshah
- County: Qasr-e Shirin
- Bakhsh: Central
- Rural District: Fathabad

Population (2006)
  - Total: 332
- Time zone: UTC+3:30 (IRST)
  - Summer (DST): UTC+4:30 (IRDT)

Nasrabad-e Seyyed Ahmad (Persian: نصرابادسيداحمد, also Romanized as Naşrābād-e Seyyed Aḩmad; also known as Saiyid Ahmad and Seyyed Aḩmad) is a village in Fathabad Rural District, in the Central District of Qasr-e Shirin County, Kermanshah Province, Iran. At the 2006 census, its population was 332, in 83 families.
