= Kalleh Jub, Qasr-e Shirin =

Kalleh Jub كله جوب
- Village
- Location within Iran
- Coordinates: 33°54′01″N 45°41′05″E
- Country: Iran
- Province: Kermanshah
- County: Qasr-e Shirin
- Bakhsh: Sumar
- Rural District: Sumar

Population (2006)
  - Total: 25
- Time zone: UTC+3:30 (IRST)
  - Summer (DST): UTC+4:30 (IRDT)

Kalleh Jub (Persian: كله جوب, Southern Kurdish: کوڵەجوو, also Romanized as Kalleh Jūb; also known as Kalleh Chūb) is a village in Sumar Rural District, Sumar District, Qasr-e Shirin County, Kermanshah Province, Iran. At the 2006 census, its population was 25, in 8 families. The village is populated by Kurds.
