= Garawa =

Garawa may refer to:

- Garawa, Kermanshah, Iran
- Garawa, Kurdistan, Iran
- Garrwa, people and language in Australia
