= Jalawla =

Town in Iraq

Jalawla گوڵاڵە Gulale
- Town
- Location within Iraq
- Coordinates: 34°16′19″N 45°10′5″E
- Country: Iraq (Disputed territories of Northern Iraq)
- Governorate: Diyala
- District: Khanaqin

Population (2015)
  - Total: 30,000

Jalawla (Arabic: جلولاء, Kurdish: گوڵاڵە, romanized: Gulale also known as Jalula) is a town in Diyala Governorate, Iraq. It is located on the Diyala River, 8 kilometres (5.0 mi) north of Sadiyah. The town is populated by Arabs, Kurds and Turkmens.

It experienced significant Arabization during the Saddam era. The town had a Kurdish majority prior to the Arabization.

== Name ==
Folk etymology derives the name Jalūlāʾ from the phrase jalūlulā (جلولولاء), which was supposedly said by the Muslim soldiers at the Battle of Jalula. Under the Ottoman Empire, the town was known as Qarah Ghān, which literally means "black blood" in Turkish; alternatively, according to Khadir Abbas, the name could be a reference to a grove of trees surrounding the town. The name went back to Jalūlāʾ in 1940, after a suggestion by the military historian Muhammad Durrah which was taken up by the government.

== History ==
=== Early history ===
Under the Sasanian Empire, Jalawla was the center of a subdistrict of the province of Šāḏ Qobāḏ, located in the eastern Sawad. The Khurasan Road, which connected the imperial capital of Ctesiphon with the Iranian highlands, passed through the town of Jalawla. The next stage on the road was Khanaqin.

The ancient city of Jalula was located on the opposite side of the river to today's town. Its location was discovered in 2023 by a team of archaeologists led by Ahmed Abdul Jabbar Khamas. As for the modern town, the site of Tall Abu Krush in the al-Tali‘ah neighborhood contains some pottery fragments but has no traces of a large urban settlement such as city walls or a mosque.

The Sasanians ultimately lost control over the town after the Battle of Jalula in 637 to Muslim invaders.

In Muslim times, the geographer Yaqut al-Hamawi applied the name Jalula to both the town and a river, and also as the name of a tasuj, a district extending along the Diyala river. According to Hamdallah Mustawfi, the town was named Ribat Jalula, because it contained a ribat attributed to the Seljuk sultan Malik Shah I.

At some point, the old town of Jalula effectively lost its urban character, and a new town would not be rebuilt until the early 20th century.

=== Modern history ===
The development of the modern city of Jalawla can be traced back to 1918, when the Jalawla train station was built. This provided new job opportunities and led to an influx of immigrants. In 1936, a permanent army camp was built, which further stimulated population growth (from transfer of soldiers to here) and economic growth. Much of this immigration came from the nearby town of al-Saadiya.

In the al-Tali‘ah neighborhood is Tall Abu Krush, which in the 1918–1958 period served as a residential area.

At the beginning of the 20th century, Jalawla (then Qarah Ghan) was just a small non-urban settlement with a population not exceeding 200, with 26 houses.

A market area called al-Sayyrah (الصّيرة), in what is now the al-Tali‘ah neighborhood, was established in the 1918–1958 period and is now called the old market. Some industrial development took place during this period, with light industry concentrated around the commercial area and automobile and machinery establishments were established along the main commercial street in the east side of town. There was growth of gypsum mining activity and textile manufacturing, using wool from the surrounding region (since large amounts of sheep were kept in the surrounding area); there was also dyeing activity, and agricultural tool making. Automobiles and tractors were introduced during this period, and their use meant that there was also mechanic workshops to repair them. The first primary school was established in 1936, in the al-Tali‘ah area. Water was often in short supply for domestic use; it was partly sourced from the water supply at the train station. There was also a generator at the train station, along with a telegraph line. A post office was established in the early 1950s. Between 1958 and 1980, two new neighborhoods were established: al-Wahdah and al-Jamahir. Al-Wahdah was planned in 1958, while al-Jamahir emerged as an unplanned area north of al-Wahdah to accommodate the increase in population.

By 1957, the population had increased from just a few dozen to 6,416. The establishment of Jalawla as a district capital caused further economic growth and, by 1965, the population had doubled to 12,279.

During the 1958–1980 period, industrial units began to move out of the central commercial area as commercial uses pushed them out toward the outskirts of this zone. The first industrial area began to appear during this period: behind the district directorate building, near the public parking garage in the al-Wahdah neighborhood. These were largely car repair places as well as heaters and agricultural pumps. Another important establishment was an ice factory in the southwest of al-Wahdah neighborhood, near the bank of the Diyala river and close to the main street; it consumed large amounts of water. The construction materials industry also grew significantly, with gravel and sand quarries displacing gypsum quarries in the south side of the city, south of al-Wahdah along the bank of the Diyala. These not only served local needs but also exported to al-Saadiya and Khanaqin districts. The gypsum quarrying moved back to the highlands, leaving behind open pits in al-Jamahir and al-Wahdah districts. By 1983, there were 9 primary schools, 3 kindergartens, 4 middle schools, and 2 secondary schools in Jalawla, mostly concentrated in the al-Uruba and al-Jamahir neighborhoods, while al-Tali‘ah in particular was short of schools. The town's first library was established in the southwest of al-Wahdah in 1975, and the Jalawla General Hospital was established in 1971 in the south of al-Wahdah. It employed 6 doctors and 9 nurses, but in practice it ended up facing a shortage of available beds. During this period, coffeehouses were popular among more elderly residents, while casinos were popular with young adults; both types of establishments were clustered in the central commercial district. The Jalawla Youth Center was established during this period in al-Jamahir, with attached playgrounds/sports fields. After the district was established in 1958, several government facilities were established in Jalawla: the district directorate, the municipal directorate, the courthouse, the irrigation and agriculture department, the military recruiting office, and the veterinary medicine department. With the exception of the municipal directorate, which was in al-Tali‘ah, all these facilities were in al-Wahdah. Municipal water and electricity works were both begun in 1961, both in al-Wahdah. Only the major roads were paved at this point; secondary streets remained unpaved.

In the 1980s and 1990s, there was significant population growth in Jalawla along with an increase in commercial and industrial activity. Commercial establishments sprang up along the main commercial street in al-Wahdah and al-Jamahir, pushing out residential uses, while a new municipal market was set up as well. This new commercial zone was next to the old one. The state also distributed residential land for the families of those killed in the Iran–Iraq War. The industrial zone by the garage in the south of al-Wahdah expanded significantly, especially with car repair, and a new industrial zone was built in al-Shuhada neighborhood along the main commercial street. A light industry zone also emerged in al-Tali‘ah, adjacent to the central commercial zone; residential houses were converted into industrial workshops. Increased demand for construction materials caused an increase in gravel and sand mining to the south of town, while concrete blocks industry grew in the town to make more construction materials. Gypsum quarries continued to retreat into the eastern highlands. Four middle and secondary schools were established, concentrated in al-Jamahir and al-Shuhada, while the Jalawla Trade and Preparatory School was established in al-Tali‘ah, the Teachers' Training Institute was established in al-Wahdah, and a kindergarten was established in al-Tali‘ah. New lands were designated for sports fields, and in the 1990s the first video game arcades appeared in the central commercial area. A new external garage was established in the al-Shuhada neighborhood on the main street. A new residential area was established, the al-Shuhada neighborhood. General expansion also continued on the outskirts and in open spaces throughout the city. The first tall buildings were built during this period, in the central commercial area. Increasing land prices and rents in the city center contributed to pushing out residential uses in favor of commercial and industrial ones. However, due to continuing horizontal expansion, the overall proportion of residential zones in the city remained high. The public healthcare did not expand during this period, although some private practices were established in the central commercial district.

It was at this point that urban planning was first begun. By 1977, the population was 19,268; in 1987, it was 26,666. In 1997, it was 30,273. In each of these decades, Jalawla's growth exceeded both regional and national growth rates. During the Iran–Iraq War, Jalawla received an influx of refugees from border settlements such as Khanaqin. During the 1990s, the town had a decreased growth rate both due to international sanctions against Iraq and due to increased economic growth in Iraqi Kurdistan, which caused a relative economic disparity that led many residents to migrate from Jalawla to Iraqi Kurdistan. Another change was that the old road was submerged when Lake Hamrin was created and the new road was built around the lake to the south, creating a more direct route to Khanaqin and removing some of Jalawla's transport significance.

Jalawla has been the center town of Jalawla District since its creation with a Republican decree in 1958. Prior to the decree, Jalawla was part of Saadiya District. Before the launch of the Ba'athist Arabization campaigns in northern Iraq in the 1960s, the town had a Kurdish majority. In the 1970s, Iraq deported a large portion of the Kurdish population of the town after having denaturalized them as Arabs were encouraged to settle instead, to intensify the Arabization of the town. Of the 28,822 people enumerated in the 1977 census, 77% were Arab, 19.8% were Kurdish and Turkmens constituted 2.5% of the population. In the 1987 census, the Arab population increased to 85.2%, while the Kurdish population decreased to 12.9% and the Turkmen to 1.7%. In the 1997 census, the Arab population stood at 83.7%, the Kurdish at 14.3% and the Turkmen at 1.9%.

Kurdish rebels (Peshmerga) captured the town on 12 March 1991 during the uprisings. The People's Mujahedin of Iran are known to have supported the 1991 Kurdish uprising. After the fall of Saddam Hussein in 2003, Kurdistan Region pressured Arab settlers in Khanaqin to settle in Jalawla which increased the Arab population further. Moreover, many Kurds returned to the town but left again due to the lack of security. Concurrently, the Arab al-Shuraifi tribe, which had settled in the area in the 1970s, was expelled from both Jalawla and Khanaqin after direct order from Kurdish politician Jalal Talabani.

=== ISIS and the aftermath ===
According to some estimates, 80% of the population was Arab when ISIS entered the town in 2014, while more than 85% of the former Kurdish population lived in IDP camps and nearby towns. From August to November 2014 the city was mostly under the control of the Islamic State of Iraq and Syria after having seized the town from Peshmerga in August 2014. On 23 November 2014, the PMF and Peshmerga jointly recaptured the city, under the command of Iranian General Qasem Soleimani. The town was jointly controlled by PMF and Peshmerga until October 2017 when the Peshmerga withdrew from the area. When Jalawla was captured from ISIS, a portion of the Kurdish population returned after encouragement from the federal government, while Peshmerga stated that no member of the Arab Kerwi tribe would be allowed back after having supported ISIS. Nonetheless, the tribe returned after Peshmerga withdrew in October 2017. Moreover, the Arab animosity towards Kurds have made it possible for Asa'ib Ahl al-Haq to recruit a number of local Arabs into its ranks and marginalize the Kurdish population. However, according to the Patriotic Union of Kurdistan and the local Sunni Arab leadership, many locals mainly support them due to fear and the exploitation of the right to return for Arabs.

== Geography ==
Jalawla is located on the middle course of the Diyala river, with the lower foothills of the Zagros Mountains rising to the east.

Jalawla is located on the steep eastern bank of the Diyala river. The river forms its western boundary, while to the east it borders the Darawishkah mountains, which are a southeastern extension of the Jabal Hamrin. To the south, there are gravel and sand quarries mark the border with the village of Marjanah. Jalawla is located on a narrow strip between the hills and the river. Because the physical space for building is limited due to lack of flat areas, expansion and new construction had to go into the highlands to the east.

The Wadi Awsaj flows from east to west across this flat area.

In the narrow flat area there is Tell Abu Krush, where the city first grew up.

In the east are the lower slopes of the upland region, which are cut up by the upper Wadi Awsaj.

The steep slopes are an obstacle to urban planning and transportation/movement. Neighborhoods in this area include al-Wahdah, al-Jamahir, and al-Shuhda'.

Jalawla is also a transportation hub for land routes connecting central Iraq (Baghdad, Baqubah, Miqdadiyah) to the northern governorates (Kalar, Kifri, and Khaninqin), as multiple road and rail connections meet here.

All water supply comes from the Diyala River, which is considered suitable for human use because there is a lack of pollutants in upstream areas.

=== Climate ===
There is no climate station at Jalawla, so data has to be estimated based on the nearby Khanaqin climate station. Average temperature peaks in July, at 33°, and is lowest in December, at 6.9°.

Jalawla is located on the southern boundary of rain-fed agriculture in Iraq; there is an annual average of 331 mm of rainfall at the nearby Khanaqin climate station measured over 1977 through 1997. The rainy season lasts from the beginning of October to the end of May before ceasing during the summer. Rain peaks during spring. There is an average of 50 to 60 rainy days per year. Despite the long rainy period, adequate rainfall is not guaranteed.

=== Neighborhoods ===
There are five main neighborhoods (mahallahs) in Jalawla: al-Tali‘ah, al-‘Urubah, al-Wahdah, al-Jamahir, and al-Shuhada'. Al-Tali‘ah represents the oldest part of the town, and was historically the most populated, but it is now the least populated neighborhood, with 3,567 residents as of 1997. The relative decrease is due to increased commercial and industrial use. Al-Jamahir is the most populous neighborhood, with 8,234 residents as of 1997. Al-Wahdah is the second most populous, with 7,863 residents as of 1997. Located in the hilly upper part of town, it was the first planned development in Jalawla and houses most of the current administrative buildings. Al-‘Urubah is by the Wadi al-Awsaj and is relatively small; its population as of 1997 was 5,544. Al-Shuhada's population was 5,031 as of 1997; it was the newest development at the time and had not yet been fully built up.

== Demographics ==
Historical population
Year	Pop.	±%
1957	6,416	—
1965	12,279	+91.4%
1977	19,268	+56.9%
1987	26,666	+38.4%
1997	30,273	+13.5%

The sex ratio of Jalawla skewed male for much of the late 20th century: in 1965, there were 136 males for every 100 females (57.6% male); in 1977, 119 (54.3%), and in 1987, 1.01 (50.3%). This is largely due to young men moving to the town for work opportunities. The imbalance continued to decline; by the 1997 census, there was a slight female majority reported (50.4%). The Iran-Iraq war may have contributed to this shift.

Population pyramid 1997
%	Males	Age	Females	%
0.3		85+		0.3
0.2		80–84		0.3
0.4		75–79		0.6
0.6		70–74		1.0
1.5		65–69		1.6
1.3		60–64		1.4
1.8		55–59		1.8
2.5		50–54		2.1
2.6		45–49		3.2
5.0		40–44		5.3
4.1		35–39		4.4
6.5		30–34		6.6
8.4		25–29		8.4
9.7		20–24		9.8
12.4		15–19		12.1
12.5		10–14		12.2
15.4		5–9		14.3
14.7		0–4		14.6

== Economy ==
There is relatively little manufacturing in Jalawla due to raw materials being relatively low in the area. The majority of workers in the town belong to the service sector. Agriculture is a small part of the local economy, since a) it's an urban area, not rural, and b) the area is mostly hilly, with poor soil and without flat spaces.

Jalawla is the primary commercial center for a surrounding region consisting of villages in Jalawla district (nahiya) as well as parts of Saadiya district, Qara Tapa district, Jabara district, and Khanaqin district. Rural residents in these areas primarily do their shopping in Jalawla for things ranging from food, clothing, tools, and household appliances. In this area, local agricultural producers also primarily sell their products in Jalawla as opposed to exporting elsewhere or selling within their own rural area.

Jalawla's rural countryside is notable for growing large quantities of peanuts (وفستق الحقل). Along with neighboring Saadiya, Jalawla is one of the two leading nahiyas in Diyala Governorate in peanut production. The surrounding area in general, a circle roughly 40 km in radius, is the single biggest peanut producing region in Iraq, and Jalawla is an important center where peanut farmers sell their produce wholesale.

An important part of Jalawla's economy is as a wholesale and distribution center within Iraq. The town's proximity to the Iran-Iraq border makes it a destination for imported manufactured goods, and the local wholesale facilities then distribute them both locally and on to other parts of Iraq. According to a 2004 survey by al-Tamimi, the most common destinations for cargo trucks leaving Jalawla were Miqdadiyah (42%) and Ba'qubah (30%), which are both important secondary distribution centers for the country.

=== Commerce ===
The central business district is located in al-Tali‘ah, on both sides of the main railway street. This is largely retail, with shops selling things like clothes, fabrics, shoes, jewelry, electric, household supplies, and food. Wholesaling is largely done on the outskirts of town, and especially at the municipal market. Prices of land are high in the central commercial area.

Although much of the CBD is mixed between all sorts of retail, there are a number of specialized markets within it: for example, the produce market (سوق الخضار), the clothing market (سوق الملابس), the foodstuffs market (سوق المواد الغذائية), and the Friday market (سوق الجملة). This area sees a lot of pedestrial traffic, especially during the morning. The biggest category is clothing, shoes, etc. sellers, followed by food, then electrical and electronic devices.

The old commercial center is al-Sayyra, which is on both sides of the al-Sikka street, between the Wadi al-Aswaj in the south and the Alwat al-Asmak in the north.

The secondary commercial area is the al-Arkan area, which begins at the intersection between the railway and the main street to the south, extends up to the Wadi al-Aswaj, and then continues on the northeast side of the Wadi al-Aswaj in the municipal market, which is immediately east of al-Sayyra. The municipal market primarily sells fruits and vegetables in its east wing, and foodstuffs in its west wing.

The main commercial street (الشارع التجاري) is part of the town's main north–south street, reaching the central al-Sayyra commercial area in front of the district directorate building. It is the town's only major commercial street. Shops line both sides of the street, interspersed with various industrial and service-sector uses. Various side streets branch off from this main street; most important among these is the one that connects to the external transportation garage, behind the district directorate; a number of car-parts shops are clustered here.

Isolated makhāzin are also located throughout the town's various residential areas to meet local demand for foodstuffs and produce.

=== Industry ===
The biggest category of industrial establishments in Jalawla are small, traditional handicraft places, with small workshops only employing one or two people. The old industrial zone around the district directorate in al-Wahdah includes a lot of places focused on repairing cars, tractors, and agricultural machinery, along with auto parts stores and restaurants. There is also a newer industrial zone established by the municipality on the south side of al-Wahdah including a few dozen firms. There are also various industrial places scattered throughout the town. About 10 sand and gravel quarries exist in the south of al-Wahdah along the banks of the Diyala river.

=== Employment ===
Economic employment by category, 1997
Sector	Total number of workers	Percent of total
Agriculture	475	6.6
Manufacturing and construction	655	9.1
Trade and commercial services, public services, and transportation	5,188	72.1
Services	--	37.7
Commerce	--	25.1
Transportation	--	9.7
Unemployed	878	12.2

== Education ==
The first primary school was established in Jalawla in 1936, and the first middle school was established in 1956. Originally these schools were the only ones serving the surrounding area, but by the early 2000s, the proliferation of primary schools in the countryside meant that there was no longer overlap. Jalawla Secondary School, on the other hand, has continued to draw students from the surrounding area due to its better faculty and higher graduation rates. The Jalawla Vocational Secondary School, established in 1984/85, remained the only one of its kind in the region as of 2003 and drew students from the nearby towns of Saadiya, Qara Tepe, and Jabara as well as from Jalawla itself (a total of 205 students was recorded in 2003). A school for training female teachers was established in 1995, and it also drew a number of students from Saadiya as well as Jalawla (a total of 39 students was recorded in 2003).

== Healthcare ==
As of 2005, Jalawla's medical facilities comprised Jalawla General Hospital, its adjoining health center, and various private clinics and pharmacies. The city hospital has regional importance, drawing patients from the surrounding towns of Saadiya, Qara Tepe, and Jabara because the medical facilities in those towns are smaller and do not have some of the medical specialties available at Jalawla's hospital.

== Mosques ==
As of 2005 there were four mosques in Jalawla, one in each neighborhood.

== Parks ==
Jalawla's steppe climate prevents natural forest growth (due to being south of the 300 mm annual rainfall line) and presents an obstacle to the creation of parks. The official city plan for Jalawla has designated space for parks, but due to the aftermath of the 1991 and 2003 wars they were negatively affected and as of 2005 much of the designated space was abandoned.

== Utilities ==
As of 2005, the power plant capacity was 10 megawatts. The municipal water supply was noted to be insufficient as of 2005, with many residents having to get water from tank trucks at a steep price. Sewage is largely dumped in the Wadi al-Aswaj, which then drains into the Diyala. This poses health problems for local residents.
