= Seyyed Sohrab =

Village in Kermanshah province, Iran

Seyyed Sohrab Persian: سيدسهراب
- Village
- Location within Iran
- Coordinates: 34°26′33″N 45°35′25″E
- Country: Iran
- Province: Kermanshah
- County: Qasr-e Shirin
- District: Central
- Rural District: Nasrabad

Population (2016)
  - Total: 83
- Time zone: UTC+3:30 (IRST)

Seyyed Sohrab (Persian: سيدسهراب) (Note: Also romanized as Seyyed Sohrāb; also known as Saiyid Fatu, Sayid Fata, and Seyyed Fotūḩ) is a village in, and the capital of, Nasrabad Rural District of the Central District of Qasr-e Shirin County, Kermanshah province, Iran.

== Demographics ==
=== Ethnicity ===
The village is populated by Kurds.

=== Population ===
At the time of the 2006 National Census, the village's population was 85 in 22 households. The following census in 2011 counted 85 people in 27 households. The 2016 census measured the population of the village as 83 people in 27 households.
