= Aqa Berar =

Village in Kermanshah province, Iran

Aqa Berar Persian: اقابرار
- Village
- Location within Iran
- Coordinates: 34°29′44″N 45°41′48″E
- Country: Iran
- Province: Kermanshah
- County: Qasr-e Shirin
- District: Central
- Rural District: Fathabad

Population (2016)
  - Total: 313
- Time zone: UTC+3:30 (IRST)

Aqa Berar (Persian: اقابرار) (Note: Also romanized as Āqā Berār) is a village in, and the capital of, Fathabad Rural District of the Central District of Qasr-e Shirin County, Kermanshah province, Iran.

== Demographics ==
=== Population ===
At the time of the 2006 National Census, the village's population was 398 in 94 households. The following census in 2011 counted 360 people in 105 households. The 2016 census measured the population of the village as 313 people in 103 households.
