= Karak Harak =

Village in Kermanshah province, Iran

Karak Harak Persian: كركهرك
- Village
- Location within Iran
- Coordinates: 34°23′44″N 45°40′56″E
- Country: Iran
- Province: Kermanshah
- County: Qasr-e Shirin
- District: Central
- Rural District: Nasrabad

Population (2016)
  - Total: 317
- Time zone: UTC+3:30 (IRST)

Karak Harak (Persian: كركهرك) is a village in Nasrabad Rural District of the Central District of Qasr-e Shirin County, Kermanshah province, Iran.

== Demographics ==
=== Ethnicity ===
The village is populated by Kurds.

=== Population ===
At the time of the 2006 National Census, the village's population was 405 in 99 households. The following census in 2011 counted 395 people in 109 households. The 2016 census measured the population of the village as 317 people in 103 households. It was the most populous village in its rural district.
