= Road 47 (Iran) =

Road in Iran

Road 47
- جاده 47

Route information
- Length: 613 km (381 mi)

Major junctions
- From: Soltanieh, Zanjan; Road 32
- Road 37-48; Freeway 6 Road 56; Road 58; Freeway 7
- To: Near Shahinshahr, Isfahan; Road 65

Location
- Country: Iran
- Provinces: Isfahan, Markazi, Hamadan, Zanjan
- Major cities: Qidar, Zanjan; Kabudar Ahang, Hamadan; Komeyjan, Markazi; Arak, Markazi; Khomein, Markazi; Golpaygan, Isfahan

Highway system
- Highways in Iran; Freeways

Road 47 is a road in northwestern Iran. It connects the major city of Isfahan with the city of Arak, the city of Hamedan, and the city of Zanjan. It is located within Hamadan Province, Isfahan Province, Markazi Province, and Zanjan Province.
