= Mamar Seh =

Mamar Seh ممرسه
- Village
- Country: Iran
- Province: Kermanshah
- County: Qasr-e Shirin
- Bakhsh: Sumar
- Rural District: Sumar

Population (2006)
  - Total: 37
- Time zone: UTC+3:30 (IRST)
  - Summer (DST): UTC+4:30 (IRDT)

Mamar Seh (Persian: ممرسه) is a village in Sumar Rural District, Sumar District, Qasr-e Shirin County, Kermanshah Province, Iran. At the 2006 census, its population was 37, in 13 families. The village is populated by Kurds.
