= Emam Hasan-e Sofla =

Emam Hasan-e Sofla امام حسن سفلي
- Village
- Location within Iran
- Coordinates: 34°21′54″N 45°43′21″E
- Country: Iran
- Province: Kermanshah
- County: Qasr-e Shirin
- Bakhsh: Central
- Rural District: Nasrabad

Population (2006)
  - Total: 137
- Time zone: UTC+3:30 (IRST)
  - Summer (DST): UTC+4:30 (IRDT)

Emam Hasan-e Sofla (Persian: امام حسن سفلي, also Romanized as Emām Ḩasan-e Soflá; also known as Emām Ḩasan, Emām Ḩassan-e Pā’īn, Imām Hasan, and Imām Hassan) is a village in Nasrabad Rural District (Kermanshah Province), in the Central District of Qasr-e Shirin County, Kermanshah Province, Iran. At the 2006 census, its population was 137, in 34 families. The village is populated by Kurds.
