= Ney Pahn-e Seyfollah =

Ney Pahn-e Seyfollah ني پهن سيفاله
- Village
- Location within Iran
- Coordinates: 34°24′30″N 45°35′19″E
- Country: Iran
- Province: Kermanshah
- County: Qasr-e Shirin
- Bakhsh: Central
- Rural District: Nasrabad

Population (2006)
  - Total: 19
- Time zone: UTC+3:30 (IRST)
  - Summer (DST): UTC+4:30 (IRDT)

Ney Pahn-e Seyfollah (Persian: ني پهن سيفاله, also Romanized as Ney Pahn-e Seyfollāh; also known as Seyfollāh) is a village in Nasrabad Rural District (Kermanshah Province), in the Central District of Qasr-e Shirin County, Kermanshah Province, Iran. At the 2006 census, its population was 19, in 5 families. The village is populated by Kurds.
