= Freeway 6 (Iran) =

Road in Iran

Freeway 6
- 6 آزادراه
- Karbala Freeway آزادراه کربلا
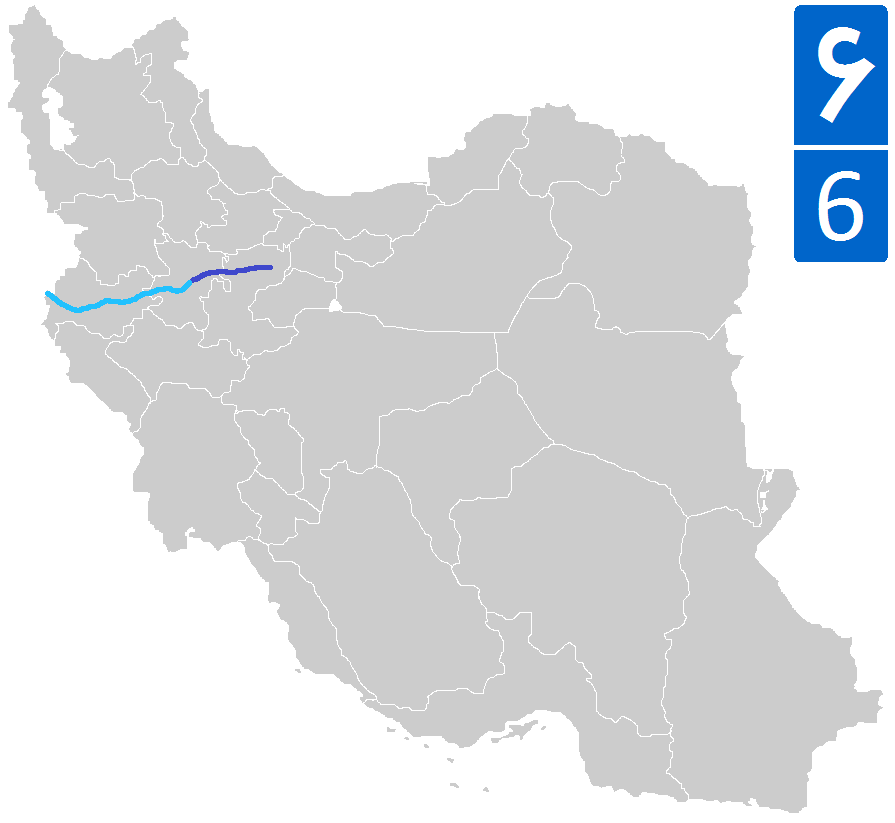

Route information
- Part of AH2
- Length: 175 km (109 mi) 560 km when completed up to Kermanshah and Khosravi.

Major junctions
- From: North of Saveh, Markazi; Freeway 5
- Road 65; Road 48; Road 47
- To: 25 km North of Hamedan, Hamedan; Road37- 48

Location
- Country: Iran
- Provinces: Markazi, Hamedan

Highway system
- Highways in Iran; Freeways

Freeway 6 is a freeway in central and western Iran located in Markazi and Hamedan provinces. It is about 175 kilometres (109 mi) long and it connects Saveh to Hamedan. The freeway was completely opened in winter (February) 2016. There are plans to expand the freeway towards Kermanshah and Khosravi near the Iraqi border and join Highway 5. The freeway runs parallel to Road 48.

== Karbala freeway ==
Karbala freeway Company was founded in 2007. Mr. Amin Choubdar, is an Iranian business executive. He is an engineer and the chief executive officer (CEO) of Karbala freeway Co.

From West to East
Under Construction
Road 37-48; North to Razan-Takestan-Tehran; South to Hamadan
Hamedan Toll Station
Road 47; North to Kabudrahang; South to Komeyjan-Arak
Fadak Service Station
Road 48; East to Famenin-Hamadan; West to Nowbaran-Saveh
Hamadan province Markazi province
Road 48; Doruzan
Nowbaran Toll Station
Nowbaran
Gharqabad
Saveh; Towards Saveh Railway Station
Aseman Service Station
Saveh Toll Station
Road 65; North to Mamuniyeh-Tehran- Road 49 (To Qazvin); South to Saveh-Salafchegan
Tehran-Saveh Freeway; North to Parand-Tehran; South to Saveh-Salafchegan
From East to West
