= Mamar Yek =

Mamar Yek ممريك
- Village
- Location within Iran
- Coordinates: 33°53′00″N 45°40′00″E
- Country: Iran
- Province: Kermanshah
- County: Qasr-e Shirin
- Bakhsh: Sumar
- Rural District: Sumar

Population (2006)
  - Total: 14
- Time zone: UTC+3:30 (IRST)
  - Summer (DST): UTC+4:30 (IRDT)

Mamar Yek (Persian: ممريك) is a village in Sumar Rural District, Sumar District, Qasr-e Shirin County, Kermanshah Province, Iran. At the 2006 census, its population was 14, in 5 families. The village is populated by Kurds.
