= Imam Hasan =

Imam Hasan (Arabic: إمام حسن), also spelled Emam Hasan, may refer to:

== People ==
- Hasan ibn Ali (c. 625–670), sometimes also referred to as al-Mujtabā: son of Ali ibn Abi Talib, grandson of Muhammad, and second Shia Imam
- Hasan al-Askari (c. 846–874), the eleventh Shia Imam
- Hasan al-Basri (c. 642–728), early and influential Islamic scholar from Basra (Iraq)

== Places ==
- Imam Hassan, Iran, a city in Bushehr province, Iran
- Imam Hassan District, a district in Deylam county, Bushehr province, Iran
- A number of villages in Kermanshah Province, Iran:
  - Emam Hasan-e Olya
  - Emam Hasan-e Sofla
  - Emam Hasan-e Vasati
