= Nal Shekan =

Nal Shekan (Persian: نعل شكن) may refer to:

- Nal Shekan, Kermanshah
- Nal Shekan, Kurdistan
