= Nal Shekan, Kermanshah =

Nal Shekan نعل شكن
- Village
- Location within Iran
- Coordinates: 33°54′57″N 45°45′59″E
- Country: Iran
- Province: Kermanshah
- County: Qasr-e Shirin
- Bakhsh: Sumar
- Rural District: Sumar

Population (2006)
  - Total: 83
- Time zone: UTC+3:30 (IRST)
  - Summer (DST): UTC+4:30 (IRDT)

Nal Shekan (Persian: نعل شكن, also Romanized as Na‘l Shekan; also known as Na‘leh Shekan Shotorān) is a village in Sumar Rural District, Sumar District, Qasr-e Shirin County, Kermanshah Province, Iran. At the 2006 census, its population was 83, in 15 families. The village is populated by Kurds.
