= Alwand Bridge =

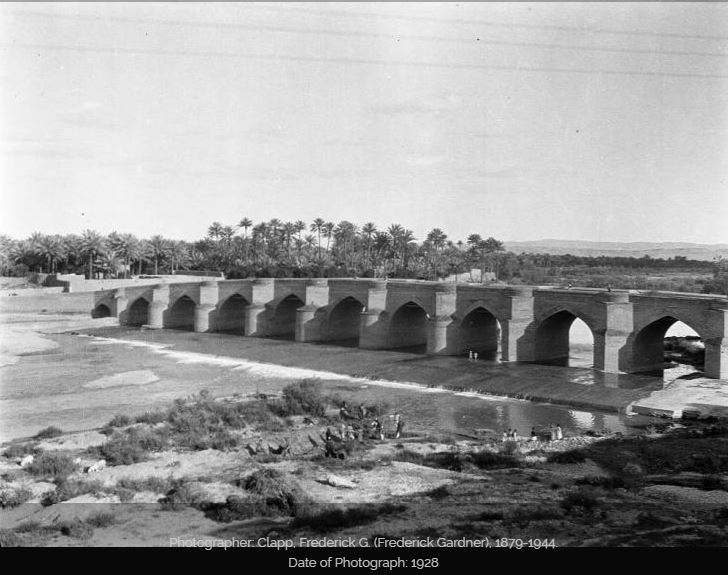
- The Historic Alwand Bridge in 1928
- Coordinates: 34°20′30″N 45°22′44″E
- Locale: Khanaqin

Location
- Interactive map of Alwand Bridge

The Alwand Bridge is one of the archaeological landmarks in the city of Khanaqin, Iraq, as it is located in the middle of the city and connects the eastern and western banks of the Helwan River.

== Naming ==
Many names were mentioned for this bridge in the past, including the Alwand Bridge, which is named after the Alwand Mountain, where the inscriptions of Darius the Great (d. 486 BC) are located. The river was known by the names Alwan during the Sumerian eras, and the people of the region still call it (Alwan) without the letter D, which was from the Arabic language, because the name Alwan in the language of the Medians means (from that high place), and it was meant that the river springs from the Alwn Mountains near the capital of the Medians, Hamadan, Ekbatan.

The people of Khanaqin also call it (Kopri), which is a word made up of two parts: (Kop), which is a word used by the Aryan peoples and means arching, and (Ri), which means road, and thus the meaning is the arched road.

It was also called the “Stone Bridge” due to some of the stones used in its construction, which were remnants of an ancient stone bridge that was built on the Alwan River, and it is relatively close to the site of the current bridge.

== History ==
Many Persian sources mention that the Sassanids who lived between (226–651) AD built the bridge 1600 years ago, i.e. in the third century AD. The road from Baghdad to Khorasan passed over it and led to the Shirin Palace. It consisted of 24 columns. This bridge remained standing until the time of Yaqut al-Hamawi, i.e. approximately at the beginning of the twenties of the eleventh century AD. He said that this bridge consisted of twenty-four arches, each arch twenty cubits, its width was 150 meters and its height from the ground was 6 meters, and its remains are located near the other one to the east, The Alwand Bridge was mentioned in the words of Abdul-Mumin Abdul-Khaliq, who died in 1390 AD, that it was great and consisted of twenty-four arches, between each arch and arch twenty cubits. It was affected by severe floods and its pillars and foundations were destroyed.

Yaqut al-Hamawi said, “Samra has palm trees, olives, almonds and snow. On the road between Samra and the neighboring village, Tehran, there is a strange and amazing bridge that is considered one of the wonders of the world’s bridges.”

== New Build ==
Most local and regional sources confirm that the beginning of the construction of the new bridge goes back to the story of the princess, sister of Shah Mohammad Ali Mirza, the former ruler of Kermanshah in 1860, when she intended to go on a religious pilgrimage to the Shiite shrines in Karbala and Najaf. When she passed through the city of Khanaqin in 1855, she faced difficulty in crossing the river because the old bridge had completely collapsed and there was no safe way to cross the river. Therefore, she decided to work on building a bridge that would facilitate the process of crossing the river in all seasons of the year. Thus, she returned to Iran and sought to build a bridge in Khanaqin. A number of architects were brought from Isfahan to Khanaqin, using walnut wood imported from Kermanshah. In addition, there are some legends that accompany the construction of the bridge, despite the lack of proven sources for them. For example, it is said that the bridge was not only built with the building materials known at that time, but the princess ordered that the heads, hands and feet of the sacrifices be collected and that pots and cauldrons be placed on the fire in water until they were fully cooked and disintegrated. This water is used in building the bridge, and she exaggerates the perfection and strength of the construction. The bridge is built with royal bricks and building materials mixed with this water. Another story, which is prevalent among the people of the city, is that the princess left a quantity of gold inside one of the bridge's pillars.

The bridge was designed and executed by the skilled architect Wali Isfahani, and he was assisted in his task by the capable builders Abbas Memar Bashi and Reza al-Banna. About five thousand workers were employed in the project, and it is said that two thousand of them died due to severe floods, falling from the top of the construction site, and other accidents that surrounded the progress of the work, and they were buried in a cemetery that still exists today in a shrine near the bridge site called the "Imam Alamdar Shrine". After its construction was completed, a grand festival was held, charity was given to the poor, banquets were held, and people crossed it on their way to Baghdad and the holy shrines. The truth is that the Khanaqin Bridge is a very strong bridge that can handle modern means of transportation with heavy loads. In the previous era, they changed the features of the bridge by demolishing (removing) the bridge fence that was built of royal bricks and fencing it with iron, and finally they built another bridge near the old bridge in preparation for leaving the old one, so that this ancient bridge did not remain in the city as they changed its residents. After the fall of Saddam Hussein's regime and the return of the residents to their city, the stone fence was rebuilt and the bridge's beauty was restored. Large vehicles were prevented from driving on it in order to preserve its engineering structure. It consists of 12 openings and rests on pillars, the highest of which reaches a height of 12 metres (39 ft).
