= Neypahan =

Neypahan ني پهن
- Village
- Location within Iran
- Coordinates: 33°51′00″N 45°38′00″E
- Country: Iran
- Province: Kermanshah
- County: Qasr-e Shirin
- Bakhsh: Sumar
- Rural District: Sumar

Population (2006)
  - Total: 17
- Time zone: UTC+3:30 (IRST)
  - Summer (DST): UTC+4:30 (IRDT)

Neypahan (Persian: ني پهن; also known as Neybahān) is a village in Sumar Rural District, Sumar District, Qasr-e Shirin County, Kermanshah Province, Iran. At the 2006 census, its population was 17, in 4 families.
