= Road 19 (Iran) =

Road in Iran

Road 19
- جاده 19

Route information
- Length: 173 km (107 mi)

Major junctions
- From: Near Poldokhtar, Lorestan; Road 37
- To: Eslamabad-e Gharb, Kermanshah; Road 48

Location
- Country: Iran
- Provinces: Lorestan, Ilam, Kermanshah

Highway system
- Highways in Iran; Freeways

Road 19 is a road in western Iran. It connects Eslamabad-e Gharb to Poldokhtar and to Tehran-Ahvaz Road.

== See also ==
- Road 17 (Iran)
