= Garraveh-ye Nomareh Do =

Garraveh-ye Nomareh Do گراوه نمره دو
- Village
- Location within Iran
- Coordinates: 34°26′42″N 45°40′12″E
- Country: Iran
- Province: Kermanshah
- County: Qasr-e Shirin
- Bakhsh: Central
- Rural District: Nasrabad

Population (2006)
  - Total: 19
- Time zone: UTC+3:30 (IRST)
  - Summer (DST): UTC+4:30 (IRDT)

Garraveh-ye Nomareh Do (Persian: گراوه نمره دو, also Romanized as Garrāveh-ye Nomareh Do; also known as Garrāveh-ye Do) is a village in Nasrabad Rural District (Kermanshah Province), in the Central District of Qasr-e Shirin County, Kermanshah Province, Iran. At the 2006 census, its population was 19, in 6 families. The village is populated by Kurds.
