= Rahahane Gharb =

Rahahane Gharb (Persian: راه آهن غرب) or Iran's west railway is a partially finished railway corridor in western Iran.

== Sections and route ==
The west railway consists of Malayer–Khosravi corridor which will eventually run to the border with Iraq and is made up of two sections. The first section from Malayer to Firuzan opened in May 2017, with planning and construction beginning in 1998 and 2001 respectively. The second section or the remaining 263 km between Kermanshah and Khosravi was planned in 2002 with its construction starting in 2012 and is being built by China Civil Engineering Construction Corporation at a cost of 3.53bn yuan.

The west railway project starts from Samangan station near Arak for 605 kilometers and passes through Malayer, Nahavand, Kangavar, Sahneh, Kermanshah, Islamabad-e Gharb, Gilan-e Gharb and Qasr-e Shirin and reaches to Khosravi town located on the border of Iran and Iraq. As of september 2022 this stretch has progressed 65 percent and the remaining 35 percent will be finished in the next three years on the condition that credit is provided. It is then connected to the port of Lattakia through Khanaqin, Baghdad, Mosul, Qamishli, Deir ez-Zor, Raqqa and Aleppo. The line is part of a new railway connecting Malayer with Khosravi on the border with Iraq.

The initial section of the line from Malayer to Firuzan opened in May 2017 and the 263 km Kermanshah–Khosravi stretch is being built by China Civil Engineering Construction Corporation, a subsidiary of China Railway Construction Corporation. A branch running south to Ilam is also planned.

== See also ==
- Kermanshah railway station
- Iraqi Republic Railways
- Syrian Railways
