= Emam Hasan-e Olya =

Emam Hasan-e Olya امام حسن عليا
- Village
- Location within Iran
- Coordinates: 34°21′53″N 45°43′44″E
- Country: Iran
- Province: Kermanshah
- County: Qasr-e Shirin
- Bakhsh: Central
- Rural District: Nasrabad

Population (2006)
  - Total: 80
- Time zone: UTC+3:30 (IRST)
  - Summer (DST): UTC+4:30 (IRDT)

Emam Hasan-e Olya (Persian: امام حسن عليا, also Romanized as Emām Ḩasan-e ‘Olyā; also known as Emām Ḩasan, Emām Ḩasan-e Bālā, Emām Ḩassan-e Bālā, Īmām Hasan, and Īmān Hassan) is a village in Nasrabad Rural District (Kermanshah Province), in the Central District of Qasr-e Shirin County, Kermanshah Province, Iran. At the 2006 census, its population was 80, in 19 families. The village is populated by Kurds.
