= Ney Pahn =

Ney Pahn (Persian: ني پهن) may refer to:

- Ney Pahn-e Abdollah
- Ney Pahn-e Seyfollah
- Neypahan
