= Naft Shahr =

Village in Kermanshah province, Iran

Naft Shahr Persian: نفت شهر
- Village
- Location within Iran
- Coordinates: 33°59′38″N 45°29′51″E
- Country: Iran
- Province: Kermanshah
- County: Qasr-e Shirin
- District: Sumar
- Rural District: Sumar

Population (2016)
  - Total: 184
- Time zone: UTC+3:30 (IRST)

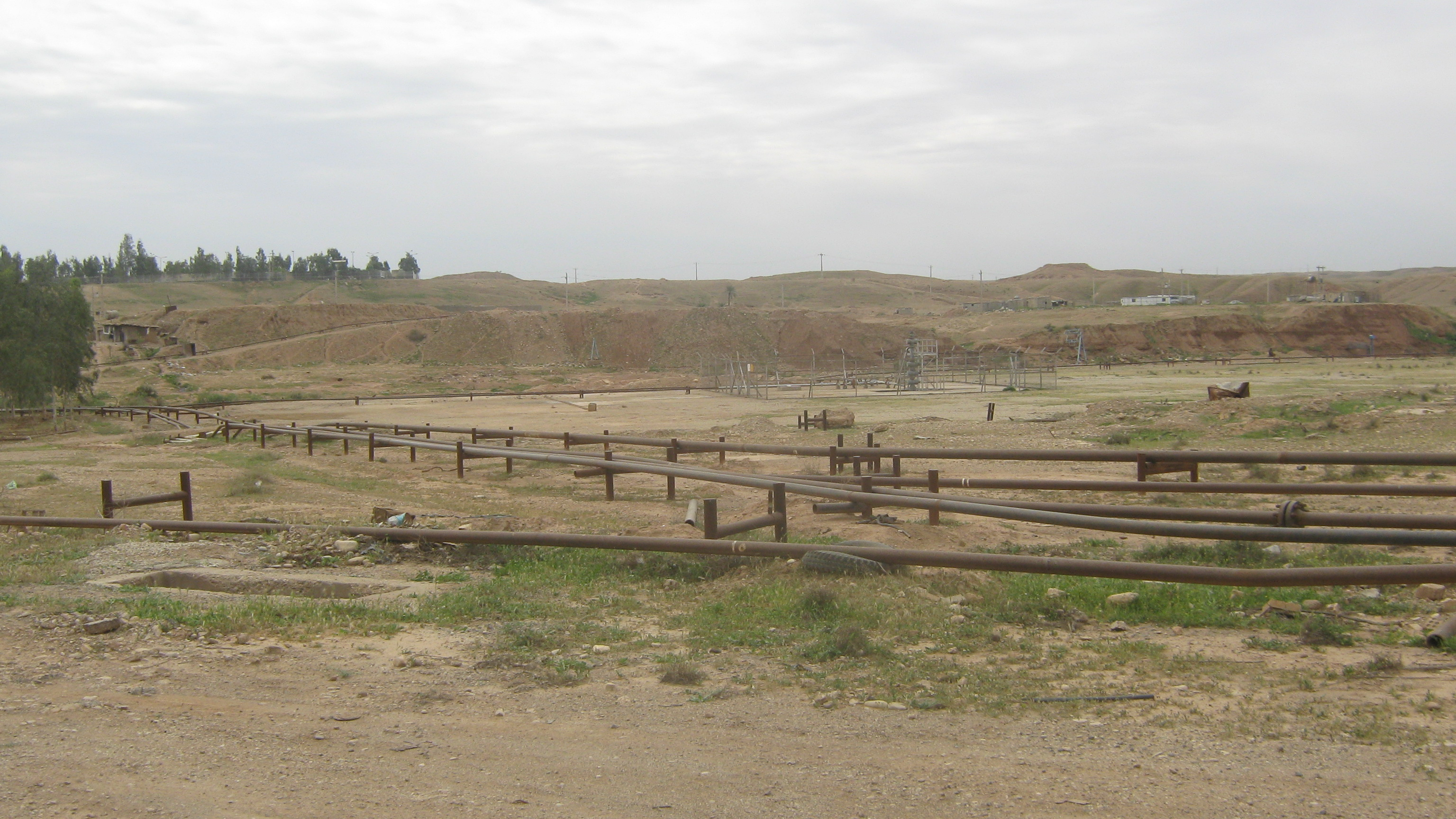
Naft Shahr, Iran

Naft Shahr (Persian: نفت شهر) (Note: Also known as Naft Shah, Naft Shāh, Naft-e Shah, Naft-e Shāh, Naft-i-Shah, and Naft-ī-Shah; Kurdish: نەفتشار) is a village in Sumar Rural District of Sumar District, Qasr-e Shirin County, Kermanshah province, Iran.

Naft Shahr is known for its oilfields. English explorers found oil in Naft Shahr for the first time in 1931. According to Mehr News Agency, Naft Shahr, which is the only active oilfield in the province, has estimated oil reserves of 692 million barrels.

== History ==
=== 2010 incident ===
On Saturday 29 May 2010 fire broke out at well number 24 at the Naft Shahr oil field. It was put out in 38 days.

== Demographics ==
=== Population ===
At the time of the 2011 National Census, the village's population was 890 in 14 households. The 2016 census measured the population of the village as 184 people in 6 households. It was the most populous village in its rural district.

== Oil field ==
Naft shahr oil field is located 72 km south of Qasr-e Shirin and 230 km south west of Kermanshah. This field is a common field between Iran and Iraq and provides a portion of Kermanshah's refinery feed. After Iraq-Iran war, reconstruction of the equipment at this refinery was incomplete and did not have safety equipment and measurement systems. The type of its oil is light crude oil.

== See also ==
- West Texas Intermediate
- Sumar
- Kalhor
