= Mamar =

Mamar may refer to:

- Məmər, Azerbaijan
- Mario role-playing games
- Mamar Yek, Iran
- Mamar Seh, Iran

== See also ==
- Mamar Kassey, jazz-pop-ethnic musical formation from Niger
