= Alwand Dam Lake =

Lake in Iraq

- بحيرة سد الوند
- Location in Iraq
- Interactive map of Alwand Dam Lake
- Location: Diyala Governorate
- Coordinates: 34°18′37″N 45°27′10″E
- Built: 2013

Alwand Dam Lake is an Iraqi lake located in Khanaqin City in Diyala in eastern Iraq. The lake was formed after the construction of the Alwand Dam and the surrounding lands, which lie southeast of Diyala up to the international border with the Republic of Iran.

== Size ==
Alwand Lake is the third largest lake in Diyala dedicated to providing drinking water and irrigating crops in Khanaqin district and its outskirts.
