= Nasrabad Rural District =

Nasrabad Rural District (Persian: دهستان نصرآباد) may refer to:

- Nasrabad Rural District (Kermanshah Province)
- Nasrabad Rural District (Taft County), Yazd province
