= Sadiyah =

Sadiyah Qesrabad
- Town
- Location within Iraq
- Coordinates: 34°11′26.0″N 45°07′14.8″E
- Country: Iraq
- Governorate: Diyala
- District: Khanaqin District

Population (2013)
  - Total: 47,213

Sadiyah (Arabic: السعدية, romanized: Al-Sadiyah; Kurdish: سەعدیە, romanized: Sedîye) is a town in Diyala Governorate, Iraq. It is located near the Diyala River 8 km (5 mi) south of Jalawla. The town is populated by Arabs, Kurds and Turkmens. It is disputed and experienced significant Arabization during the Saddam era.

Sadiyah is controlled by Badr Organization.

== History ==
Sadiyah has been the center town of Sadiyah Sub-District since the Ottoman era. Sadiyah was used as winter pasture by the Kurdish Kalhor and Sanjâbi tribes who would pay pasturage dues to the Ottomans. As part of the revolt of 1920, Sadiyah fell on 14 August 1920 largely due to the work of the Kurdish Dilo tribe.

Kurds constituted 50% of the town in the 1947 census and 40.5% in 1957. Arabs constituted 47.1% of the population in 1957, while Iraqi Turkmens were 12.4%. In the 1965 census, Arabs were the majority with 58.4% while Kurds constituted 24.7% and Turkmens were 9.6%. In the 1977 census, the Arab population increased to 90.2%, while Kurds and Turkmens were 5.1% and 4% respectively. In 1987, Arabs were 87.8% of the population, Kurds were 16.8% and Turkmens were 5.4%, while the numbers were 83.1%, 9.9% and 7% for Arabs, Kurds and Turkmens, respectively in 1997. More recent estimates state that Kurds constituted 38% in 2003 and 12% in 2012.

After the fall of Saddam Hussein in 2003, Kurdistan Region pressured Arab settlers in Khanaqin to settle in Sadiyah which increased the Arab population further. Peshmerga was deployed to the town in 2011 after request from the federal government in Baghdad to counter the attacks on the local Kurds. The dire security after the overthrow of Saddam Hussein in 2003, forced more Kurds to leave the town.

=== ISIS and aftermath ===
In the early hours of 13 June, ISIS seized Sadiyah, after Iraqi security forces had abandoned their posts. Several villages around the Hamrin Mountains were also captured. Sadiyah was captured by the Popular Mobilization Forces in November 2014. As of 2018, 80% of the Kurdish population have not returned to the town.

== See also ==
- Khanaqin
- Jalawla
