= Road 56 (Iran) =

Road in Iran

Road 56
- جاده 56

Route information
- Part of AH2 AH8
- Length: 248 km (154 mi)

Major junctions
- From: Qom, Qom; Freeway 7
- Road 65; Freeway 5 Road 47
- To: Borujerd, Lorestan; Road 37

Location
- Country: Iran
- Provinces: Qom, Markazi, Lorestan
- Major cities: Borujerd, Arak, Qom

Highway system
- Highways in Iran; Freeways

Road 56 is a road in central Iran. It connects the central city of Qom in Qom province to western city of Borujerd in Lorestan province. It starts from the northern Ring road of Qom then connects Qom - and via other roads Tehran and Esfahan - to the industrial city of Arak. After Arak it continues towards west and it ends in Borujerd there run into by Road 37 & Road 52.

== Gallery ==
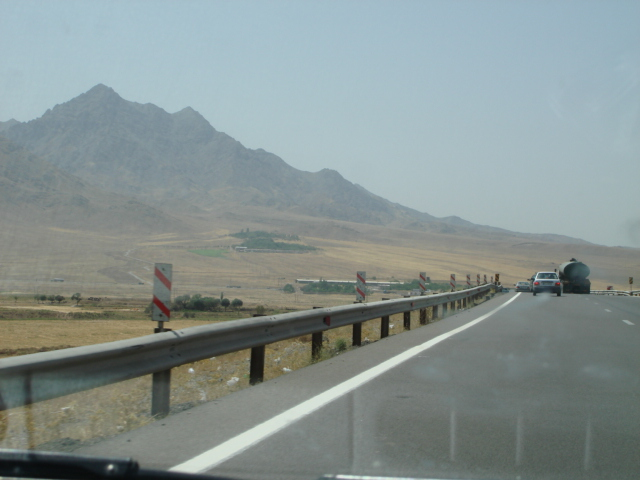
View of Road 56 between Qom and Arak

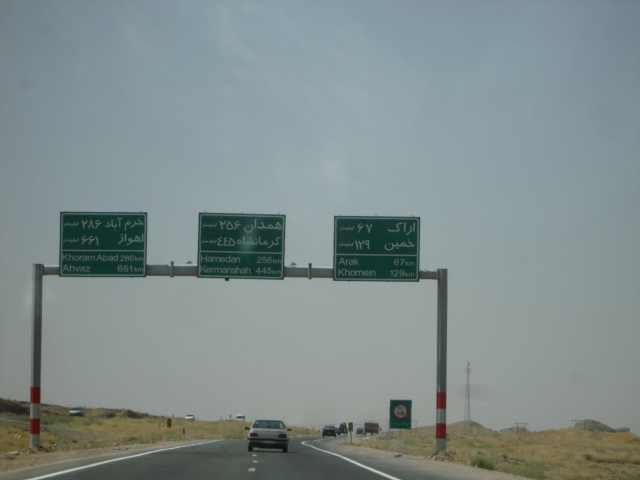
Road sign of Road 56 from Qom to Arak

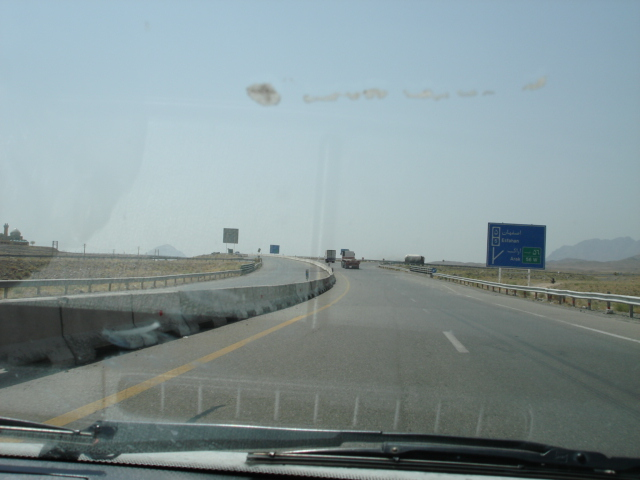
Junction of Tehran-Isfahan Freeway via Saveh and Salafechegan and Road 56
