= Alwand Dam =

Coordinates: 34.3148°N 45.4399°E

- Official name: سد الوند
- Country: Iraq
- Location: Diyala Governorate, khanaqin
- Purpose: Irrigation, flood protection
- Construction began: 2010
- Opening date: 2013
- Construction cost: 28 billion dinars
- Owner(s): Ministry of Water Resources (Iraq)

Alwand Dam is a dam located on the Alwand River, southeast of Khanaqin, 6 km (3.7 mi) from the Iraqi-Iranian border. It is a hydroponic dam with a mud core with a length of 1,342 m (4,403 ft) and a height of 24 m (79 ft). The storage quantities in the dam's lake is 38,000,000 m^{3} (1.3×10^{9} cu ft) and the surface area of the lake is 6,200,000 m^{2} (67,000,000 sq ft).

== History ==
At the beginning of 2013, the dam began operating. The importance of the dam lies in protecting Khanaqin from floods and torrential rains that come from the upper river. The dam's water is used in agricultural projects, drinking water and liquefaction, especially in the summer, and the surplus is drained to the Hemrin Dam. The foundation stone for the dam was laid in 2010, and the General Rafidain Company constructed the dam. The dam was opened in 2013, and its cost exceeded 28 billion dinars.

== Dam collapse rumors ==
Many rumors appeared at the end of 2014 after an earthquake occurred in the area, the most prominent of which was the collapse of the dam, which prompted people to head to higher areas to escape from drowning, but it became clear later that this was nothing but a rumor.
