= Freeway 6 =

Freeway 6 may refer to:

- Freeway 6 (Greece)
- Freeway 6 (Iran)
- Freeway 6 (Taiwan)
