= Qasr-e Shirin =

City in Kermanshah province, Iran

Qasr-e Shirin Qesrî Şîrîn
- City
- Persian: قصرشیرین; Kurdish: قەسری شیرین
- Location within Iran
- Coordinates: 34°30′42″N 45°34′45″E
- Country: Iran
- Province: Kermanshah
- County: Qasr-e Shirin
- District: Central
- Established: 7th century

Government
  - Mayor: Abbas Karami
- Elevation: 333 m (1,093 ft)

Population (2016)
  - Total: 18,473
  - Demonym: Qasri
- Time zone: UTC+3:30 (IRST)
- Postal code: 67817
- Area code: 0835

Qasr-e Shirin (Persian: قصرشیرین, lit. 'Shirin's Palace') (Note: Also romanized as Qasr-e-Shīrīn and Qasr-e Širin; also known as Ghasr-ī-Shīrīn, Ghasr-Shīrīn, and Qesrî Şîrîn; Kurdish: قەسری شیرین, romanized as Qesirî Şîrîn) is a city in the Central District of Qasr-e Shirin County, Kermanshah province, Iran, serving as capital of both the county and the district. Its population in 2016 was 18,473. It is a Free-trade zone (FTZ) and is populated by Kurds.

== Etymology ==
The city is named after Shirin, the Christian wife of the Sasanian King of Kings (shahanshah) Khosrow II (r. 590–628).

== History ==
=== Sasanian era ===
Historical and literary works attribute the building of the city to Khosrow Parviz of the Sassanids.

=== Iran-Iraq war (1980–1988) ===
Qasr-e-Shirin was a small town until 1270 AD. During World War I, it served as a border town for both German and Ottoman soldiers, as well as English and Russian soldiers. Qasr-e Shirin underwent destruction during the Iran-Iraq war but was later restored following the war's end. Currently, the city has undergone significant expansion and transformed into an expansive region.

=== Postwar reconstruction-present ===
In 1992, the postwar reconstruction process began.

In June 2006, archaeological excavations in Shirin's castle resulted in the discovery of the dais of the castle which had been used as the seat of the king. The establishment of Qasr-e Shirin free trade-industrial zone was approved on 5 May 2021.

== Demographics ==
Qasr-e Shirin Population History
Year	Pop.	±% p.a.
1956	23,901	—
1964	19,904	−2.26%
1976	23,224	+1.29%
1986	0	−100.00%
1990	0	0.00%
1996	12,726	—
2006	15,437	+1.95%
2011	17,959	+3.07%
2016	18,473	+0.57%

=== Language ===
The linguistic composition of the city:

Qasr-e Shirin linguistic composition
Language	percent
Southern Kurdish	80%
Central Kurdish	10%
Gorani	10%

=== Population ===
At the time of the 2006 National Census, the city's population was 15,437 in 3,893 households. The following census in 2011 counted 17,959 people in 4,751 households. The 2016 census measured the population of the city as 18,473 people in 5,473 households.

== Climate ==
Qasr-e Shirin has a hot semi-arid climate (BSh) according to the Köppen climate classification. Qasr-e Shirin experiences very hot and dry summers where mean temperature exceeds 35 °C (95 °F) in July and August, with daily maximum above 40 °C (104 °F). The highest recorded temperature was 50.8 °C (123.4 °F) in July 2010. Winters are mild to cool and frost occurs 4.6 days per year on average. The lowest recorded temperature was −5.0 °C (23.0 °F) in January 2007.

The city is known for its agricultural productivity due to rich soil and plentiful water from the Alwand River, which runs through the city. The weather is mild in winter but hot and dry during the summer. The results of research done in 2018 on determining the vulnerability of fish farmers to climate change in Qasr-e Shirin revealed that climate change had a major impact on fish loss, shortened production cycle, and lower fish production.

Dust storms in recent years have troubled people.

Climate data for Qasr-e Shirin
Month	Jan	Feb	Mar	Apr	May	Jun	Jul	Aug	Sep	Oct	Nov	Dec	Year
Record high °C (°F)	25.4 (77.7)	28.1 (82.6)	34.6 (94.3)	38.7 (101.7)	44.3 (111.7)	48.5 (119.3)	50.8 (123.4)	49.8 (121.6)	47.8 (118.0)	43.1 (109.6)	37.0 (98.6)	30.4 (86.7)	50.8 (123.4)
Mean daily maximum °C (°F)	15.6 (60.1)	16.1 (61.0)	20.0 (68.0)	25.3 (77.5)	32.3 (90.1)	39.0 (102.2)	42.7 (108.9)	43.7 (110.7)	40.1 (104.2)	34.6 (94.3)	25.6 (78.1)	18.6 (65.5)	29.5 (85.1)
Daily mean °C (°F)	10.5 (50.9)	10.9 (51.6)	14.4 (57.9)	18.8 (65.8)	25.3 (77.5)	31.2 (88.2)	34.4 (93.9)	35.3 (95.5)	32.0 (89.6)	26.7 (80.1)	19.3 (66.7)	13.0 (55.4)	22.7 (72.8)
Mean daily minimum °C (°F)	5.0 (41.0)	5.6 (42.1)	8.0 (46.4)	12.2 (54.0)	17.8 (64.0)	22.4 (72.3)	25.1 (77.2)	25.8 (78.4)	22.9 (73.2)	18.7 (65.7)	12.7 (54.9)	7.4 (45.3)	15.3 (59.5)
Record low °C (°F)	−5.0 (23.0)	−4.2 (24.4)	−3.0 (26.6)	−0.4 (31.3)	7.8 (46.0)	12.2 (54.0)	16.6 (61.9)	18.2 (64.8)	13.4 (56.1)	9.4 (48.9)	0.5 (32.9)	−4.8 (23.4)	−5.0 (23.0)
Average precipitation mm (inches)	54.8 (2.16)	70.2 (2.76)	41.5 (1.63)	45.6 (1.80)	19.0 (0.75)	0.4 (0.02)	0.1 (0.00)	0.1 (0.00)	0.1 (0.00)	5.9 (0.23)	63.5 (2.50)	57.5 (2.26)	358.7 (14.11)
Average rainy days	7.8	9.6	6.8	7.6	6.2	0.3	0.1	0.1	0.1	1.6	6.5	7.7	54.4
Average relative humidity (%)	65.7	66.4	57	50.6	37	21.5	19.9	20	20.9	28.8	50.3	63.3	41.8
Mean monthly sunshine hours	172.9	175.4	202.5	223.4	265.8	328.6	339.2	343.1	328.8	265.5	210.7	177.4	3,033.3
Source: (March 1997- March 2022)

== Economy ==
=== Agriculture ===
Qasr-e Shirin is especially known for its date palm trees and lemon. The agricultural organization of Qasr-e Shirin is building the biggest garden in the Middle East.

=== Border trade ===
Qasr-e Shirin has for long played an important economic role in the region. A large share of the country's exports to Iraq pass through the city, with its two main border terminals Parviz border and Khosravi. In the Iranian calendar year 1393 (21 March 2014 – 20 March 2015), commodities worth $1.9 billion were exported to Iraq through the border crossings of Qasr-e Shirin. There are trading companies active in doing exports to Iraq.

Established in 1997, Parviz border crossing (Persian: گذرگاه مرزی پرویز) is located to the northwest at 5 kilometers from the city center. The source of its name is a village by the same name on the Kurdish Iraq side of the border. About 50 percent of Iran's non-oil products are being exported to Iraq via Parviz border crossing, a major land route for trade. On average, 800-1,200 trucks carrying Iranian goods pass the crossing and continue on to Iraq daily.

An average of 500 tankers import fuel from Iraq's Kurdistan region to Parviz border daily and return to Iraq after being discharged at Iran's southern ports. According to Yavar Mohammadi, one governor of the western Iranian city of Qasr-e Shirin, Parviz border crossing plays a significant role in the prosperity of the Iranian economy in general and Kermanshah province in particular. The border crossing has been named the most active trade checkpoint out of 86 crossings between Iran and Iraq. It has put thousands of Iranians to work. In the year March 2021 – 2022, exports to Iraq from this terminal stood at 2.53 million tons worth $1.02 billion.

=== Tourism ===
==== Qasr-e Shirin and Khosravi ====
Qasr-e Shirin and Khosravi have many modern hotels and restaurants, with five three-star hotels and other two-star hotels, serving both pilgrims to Iraq's holy Shia shrines and tourists and businessmen visiting the city. Because of the Khosravi border closure from June 2013 to September 2019 to caravan pilgrims (upon whom the hospitality industry is heavily dependent), and again during the coronavirus pandemic, the industry experienced a recession.

Iran and Iraq reached an agreement to resume the regular dispatching of caravan pilgrims starting 21 November 2022 from Khosravi border crossing. Religious tourists from northern, northwestern and central Iranian provinces are to be dispatched to Iraq after spending one night at Qasr-e Shirin and Khosravi hotels.

==== Parviz border crossing ====
Parviz border's passenger hall was inaugurated on 3 February 2015. Of all the common border crossings between Iran and Iraq, crossing the border using a private car is possible only through Parviz border crossing.

== Culture ==
Qasr-e Shirin anthropology museum was opened in August 2008. Because of a lack of staff its operation was later limited to the thirteen days of holiday during Nowruz of every new year. It is one of the largest in Kermanshah province.

== Infrastructure ==
=== Transport ===
==== Roads ====
The main access road is the Kermanshah-Khosravi highway through the ring road. The other one is a two-lane road to Gilan-e Gharb. The resurfacing of 9 kilometers of this road with a 120 billion rial budget began in October 2022. It is an alternative route to Eslamabad-e Gharb and Kermanshah using the Ghalajeh tunnel. It also gives access to Ilam province after the small remaining part of miandar road in the Gilan-e Gharb-Eyvan route was paved in 2015 and made the distance to Ilam province around 40 Kms shorter through this road.

==== Rail ====
The city is near a railway route under construction called Rahahane Gharb (Iran west railway) planned to connect Iran to Iraqi railway system and ultimately to the Syrian Mediterranean port city of Latakia. Its construction is due to be completed by 1405 Iranian year through Kermanshah–Khosravi line. Qasr-e Shirin FTZ is considered the connecting point of Kermanshah railway to Baghdad railway.

==== Air ====
There is no airport serving the city. However after the approval of its free trade zone there have been calls for the urgency of the construction of a small scale airport in order for the FTZ to prosper. It would be the second airport in Kermanshah province.Kermanshah Airport which is the regional hub is the nearest airport.

=== Health systems ===
Hazrate Abolfazl Abbas is the hospital that serves the town and people from Iraq. It has 96 beds. Built in 1998 during the postwar reconstruction process, because of the lack of medical specialists it functioned at the level of a round the clock clinic until early January 2006 when some specialists joined and a few specialty wards were activated.

There is also a sanitation center and a 24-hour drugstore. Due to the city's two border crossings with Iraq and its proximity to several Iraqi cities it attracts and has the potential to attract Iraqi medical tourists. According to Sa’dollah Masudian, the Iranian consul general in Iraq's Sulaymaniyah Governorate in June 2018, each day 1500 visas are issued for Iraqi travelers to Iran at Iran's consulate in Sulaymaniyah, one third of which is dedicated for medical tourism.

=== International border crossings ===
There are two international border crossings. Parviz border crossing which is 5 kilometers away from the city center and borders the Kurdish region of Iraq and the much older Khosravi border crossing which is 18 kilometers away from the city on the way to Khanaqin and Baghdad in Iraq.

== Education ==
=== Higher education ===
The higher education center of Qasr-e Shirin which was an affiliate of Razi University was a public university in Qasr-e Shirin that was shut down in the first half of the 2000s. Its buildings have been given to the following semi public and private universities:

- Payam Noor university of Qasr-e Shirin opened in 2007
- Islamic Azad university of Qasr-e Shirin opened in 2006 There are plans to build the international campus of Razi university in Qasr-e Shirin.

== See also ==
- Taq-e Gara
- Naft Shahr
- Taq Kasra
- Byzantine Empire
- Mehran, Ilam
- Treaty of Zuhab
- Kalhori
- Garmian Region
- Arvand Free Zone
- Kermanshah railway station
- Baghdad Central Station

== Sources ==
- Wiesehöfer, Josef (2006). "Qaṣr-e Šīrīn". In Salazar, Christine F.; Landfester, Manfred; Gentry, Francis G. (eds.). Brill's New Pauly. Brill Online.
