= Highway 5 (Iraq) =

Road in Iraq

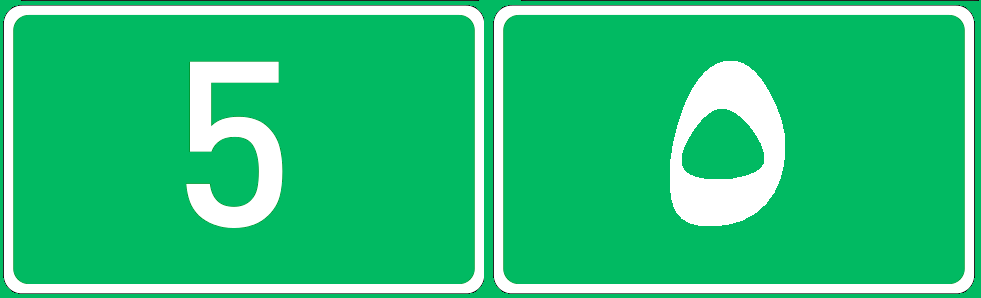
Highway 5
- ٥ طريق رقم

Route information
- Part of

Major junctions
- From: Baghdad
- To: Khanaqin AH2 / Road 48

Location
- Country: Iraq

Highway system
- Highways in Iraq

Highway 5 is an Iraqi highway which extends from Baqubah to the Khosravi border crossing and to Qasr-e Shirin in Iran. It passes through Muqdadiyah, As Sa'Diyah and Khanaqin.
