= Fathabad Rural District =

Fathabad Rural District (Persian: دهستان فتح آباد) may refer to:

- Fathabad Rural District (Fars Province)
- Fathabad Rural District (Baft County), Kerman province
- Fathabad Rural District (Kermanshah Province)
- Fathabad Rural District (Khatam County), Yazd province
