= Khosravi, Kermanshah =

Village in Kermanshah province, Iran

Khosravi Persian: خسروی
- Village
- Location within Iran
- Coordinates: 34°23′22″N 45°28′16″E
- Country: Iran
- Province: Kermanshah
- County: Qasr-e Shirin
- District: Central
- Rural District: Alvand

Population (2016)
  - Total: 52
- Time zone: UTC+3:30 (IRST)

Khosravi (Persian: خسروی) (Note: Also romanized as Khosravī and Khosrovī; also known as Khosrowvī, Khūsrawī, and Khūsrovī) is a village in, and the capital of, Alvand Rural District of the Central District of Qasr-e Shirin County, Kermanshah province, Iran.

== History ==
On 10 May 1992, an unidentified number of Iraqi and Iranian POWs were exchanged at Khosravi border; on 19 May 1993, another 200 Iraqi POWs were released there; and on 18 August 1995, approximately 100 Iraqi POWs were released near the Iran/Iraq border of Mundharieh-Khosravi. In October 1995, Iran and Iraq agreed to exchange the remains of the troops killed from both sides during the war via Khosravi border crossing. Another POW exchange occurred in March 2003. The first group of Iranian religious tourists left for Iraq on 15 August 1998 via Khosravi after 20 years of border closure to pilgrims. Prior to 2003, Khosravi was the sole official and active border crossing between Iran and Iraq.

=== 2026 Iran massacres ===
During the 2025–2026 Iranian protests, Iran International reported that on 2 January 2026, Iraqi militias affiliated with the Iranian government recruited forces to assist Iranian security forces in suppressing protests in Iran. The troops were reportedly transported through border crossings including Khosravi.

== Demographics ==
=== Ethnicity ===
The village is populated by Kurds.

=== Population ===
At the time of the 2006 National Census, the village's population was 11 in 5 households. The following census in 2011 counted 32 people in 13 households. The 2016 census measured the population of the village as 52 people in 11 households. It was the most populous village in its rural district.

== Infrastructure ==
=== Transport ===
==== Roads ====
Road 48, or "Karbala Highway," having roadside tree planting as a distinctive feature, ends here on the Iranian side. It then joins Highway 5 on the Iraqi side. In the year 2000 officials of the Iranian Roads and Transportation Ministry and their Iraqi counterparts reached an agreement for the transit of passenger and cargo on the Kermanshah-Khosravi Road as part of land transportation link between the two countries. The resurfacing of 4.2 km of the return lanes of the 10th section of the Karbala highway situated between Qasr-e Shirin and Khosravi began on 6 June 2022. This section is a divided highway using guard rails. Khosravi is considered to be the end of the Asian Highway Route 2, which goes all the way to Singapore.

==== Border terminal ====
The Khosravi border terminal was inaugurated in March 2002 with a capacity of 10,000 travelers per day. Construction work for the border terminal had begun in 1998. The terminal comprises a customs office as well as passenger and cargo corridors. It was announced as the largest land border terminal in Iran and the Middle East and still is. The border is known as Manzarieh/Munthrya on the Iraqi side of the border. Two 3-star hotels were opened in 2011 to accommodate mainly Iranian religious tourists crossing the border. In 2013, 2,000 Iranian pilgrims crossed the Khosravi border terminal to reach Iraq every day, according to the then governor of the Iranian city of Qasr-e Shirin. This number was 3,000 for Iraqi pilgrims crossing into Iran in September 2019.

Khosravi border terminal, 19 km to the southwest of Qasr-e Shirin, mostly overlooks and interacts with the Arab region of Iraq and is open from 7 AM to 4:30 PM, unlike Parviz border terminal, closely located to the north of the county center and mainly in contact with the Kurdish region of Iraq. It is open 24 hours a day. According to the latest figures, in the first three months of the Iranian solar year 1402, the number of people entering the country was 27,315 and the number of exists stood at 23,577. These numbers show a significant increase compared to the same period of the year before.

==== Rail ====
The railway route the west railway known domestically as Rahahane Gharb which is under construction and which is going to connect Iran to Iraq will have its last station in Khosravi.

== Border trade ==
Khosravi has a long history of trade with Iraq. It is home to the biggest international export terminal in the Middle East. Khosravi commercial border is located south of Khosravi terminal, next to its customs. Improvement and mobilization of this commercial border has been carried out since 2001. In a MoU signed in 2006 between the governor general of Kermanshah Province and the governor of Sulaymaniyah the two sides agreed to exchange auto spare parts and fuel through Khosravi. Averagely, in 2014, 51,000 exported shipments were transferred through this commercial border. The most important goods exported from this border to the central and southern parts of Iraq were cement, tiles, ironware, fruit, and vegetables. Commercial exchanges and border trade is done by as many as 500 trucks on a daily basis according to the figures from 2016, June 2018 and 2021. Exports hit $687 million in the year 2021.

=== Free trade zone ===
Because Khosravi customs has extensive infrastructural facilities, Kermanshah province governor general announced the proposal of the inclusion of Khosravi in Qasr-e Shirin free trade zone on 21 August 2021 to the government.
