= Alvand Rural District (Qasr-e Shirin County) =

Rural district in Kermanshah province, Iran

Alvand Rural District Persian: دهستان الوند
- Rural District
- Location within Iran
- Coordinates: 34°25′49″N 45°31′09″E
- Country: Iran
- Province: Kermanshah
- County: Qasr-e Shirin
- District: Central
- Capital: Khosravi

Population (2016)
  - Total: 184
- Time zone: UTC+3:30 (IRST)

Alvand Rural District (Persian: دهستان الوند) is in the Central District of Qasr-e Shirin County, Kermanshah province, Iran. Its capital is the village of Khosravi.

== Demographics ==
=== Population ===
At the time of the 2006 National Census, the rural district's population was 16 in 8 households. There were 375 inhabitants in 41 households at the following census of 2011. The 2016 census measured the population of the rural district as 184 in 27 households. The most populous of its 19 villages was Khosravi, with 52 people.
