= Road 64 (Iran) =

Road in Iran

Road 64
- جاده 64

Route information
- Length: 271 km (168 mi)

Major junctions
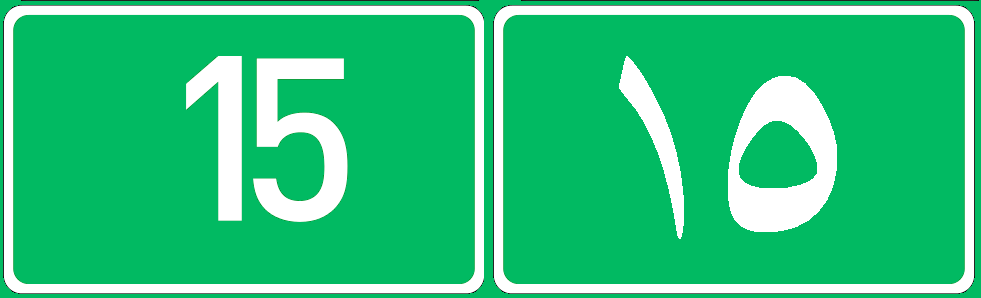
- From: Mehran, Ilam; Iraq Road 15 (Iraq)
- Road 17
- To: Near Andimeshk, Khuzestan; Road 37

Location
- Country: Iran
- Provinces: Ilam, Khuzestan
- Major cities: Dehloran, Ilam; Mehran, Ilam

Highway system
- Highways in Iran; Freeways

Road 64 is a road in western Iran connecting Mehran Border to Khuzestan.
