= Freeway 5 =

Freeway 5 may refer to:

- Freeway 5 (Greece)
- Freeway 5 (Iran)
- Freeway 5 (Taiwan)
