= Sumar, Iran =

City in Kermanshah province, Iran

Sumar Persian: سومار
- City
- Location within Iran
- Coordinates: 33°53′09″N 45°38′22″E
- Country: Iran
- Province: Kermanshah
- County: Qasr-e Shirin
- District: Sumar

Population (2016)
  - Total: 180
- Time zone: UTC+3:30 (IRST)

Sumar (Persian: سومار) (Note: Also romanized as Sowmār and Sūmār; also known as Soormar) is a city in, and the capital of, Sumar District of Qasr-e Shirin County, Kermanshah province, Iran.

== Demographics ==
=== Ethnicity ===
The city is populated by Kurds.

=== Population ===
At the time of the 2006 National Census, the city's population was 20 in 15 households. The following census in 2011 counted 9 people in 5 households. The 2016 census measured the population of the city as 180 people in 9 households.

== Border market ==
Sumar border market was inaugurated as the ninth border market on the Iranian side of the Iran-Iraq border on 5 April 2015. The border market, in which more than 100 billion rials has been invested, was officially inaugurated during a ceremony attended by the governors of Kermanshah and the Iraqi province of Dialeh. It is in the Sumar-Mandali border region. As its first commercial activity, the 40-hectare border market's primary aim was to export 200 tons of cement to Iraq. Currently, Parviz border market near the city of Qasr-e Shirin is the major export channel through which 52% of the Iranian goods are exported to Iraq.

== See also ==
- Soumar (missile), is named after this city.
- Kalhor
- Naft shahr
- Eyvan
- Eyvan County
- Ghalajeh tunnel
- Gilan-e Gharb County
