= Kermanshah railway station =

Railway station in Kermanshah, Iran

Kermanshah railway station ایستگاه راه آهن کرمانشاه

General information
- Location: Kermanshah, Kermanshah province Iran
- Coordinates: 34.3385°N 47.1318°E
Location

Kermanshah railway station (Persian: ایستگاه راه آهن کرمانشاه) is a railway station located in the city of Kermanshah, in the province of the same name, in Iran.

== Opening ==
The station was opened by Hassan Rouhani on 20 March 2018. Rouhani appeared in Kermanshah Railway Station ordering the first passenger train to leave Kermanshah for the holy city of Mashhad. He also ordered the Kermanshah-Mashhad train to leave and congratulated the people of Kermanshah, saying: "I announce the start of the first trip of Kermanshah train from this beautiful city to Mashhad".

== See also ==
- Islamic Republic of Iran Railways
- Khosravi railway station
- Baghdad Central Station
- Rahahane Gharb
