= Khosrow Palace =

Remains of a Sasanian palace

Khosrow's Palace
- کاخ خسرو (Persian)
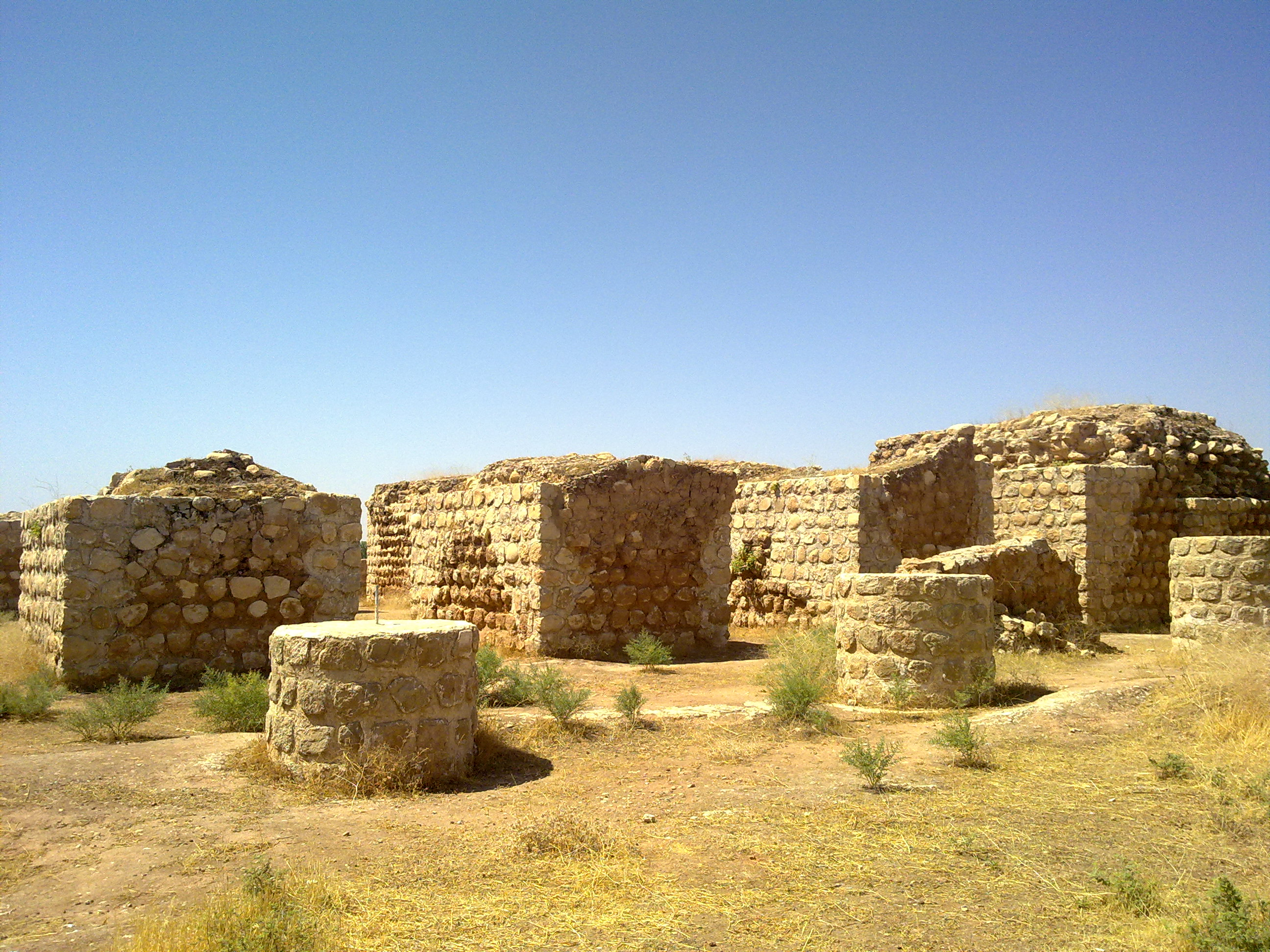
- Interactive map of Khosrow's Palace
- Location: Qasr-e Shirin, Iran

History
- Built: Sasanian era
- Built for: Khosrow II

Site notes
- Architectural style: Sasanian style

Iran National Heritage List
- Official name: Khosrow Palace
- Type: Ruins
- Designated: 1931
- Reference no.: 32
- Conservation organization: Cultural Heritage, Handicrafts and Tourism Organization of Iran

Khosrow's Palace (Persian: کاخ خسرو) is the remains of a Sasanian palace in Qasr-e Shirin, Iran.The Palace was built on the order of Khosrow II for his Christian wife, Shirin.

It was listed among the national heritage sites of Iran with the number 32 on 16 September 1931.

== Gallery ==
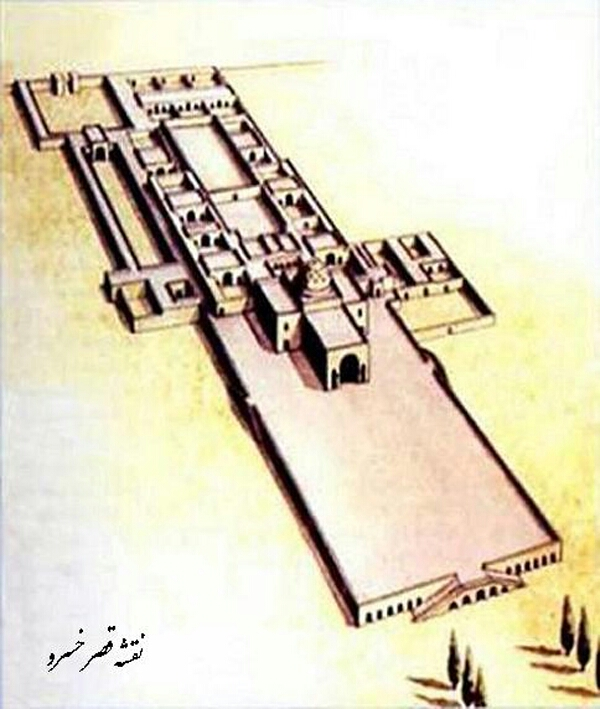

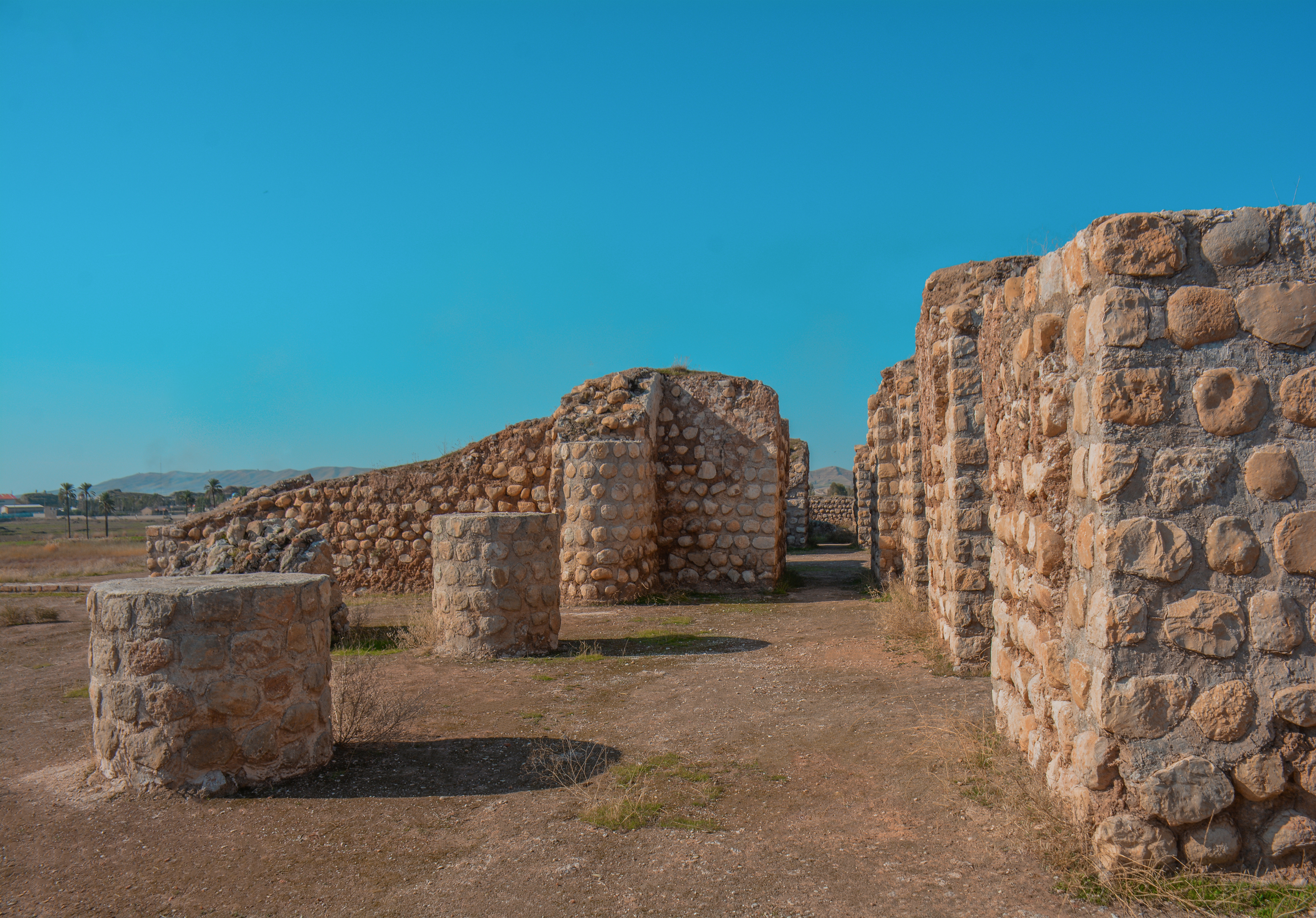

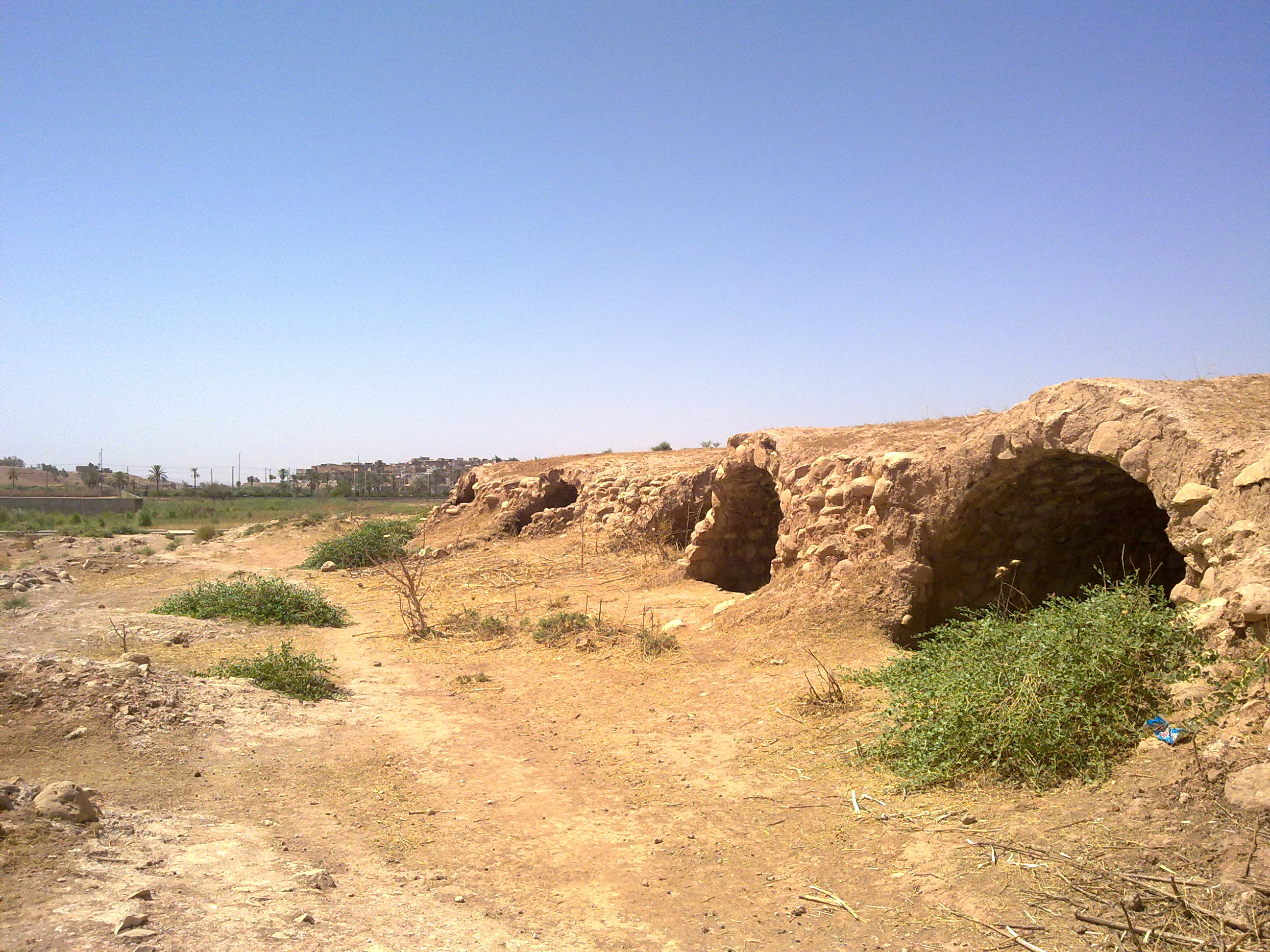

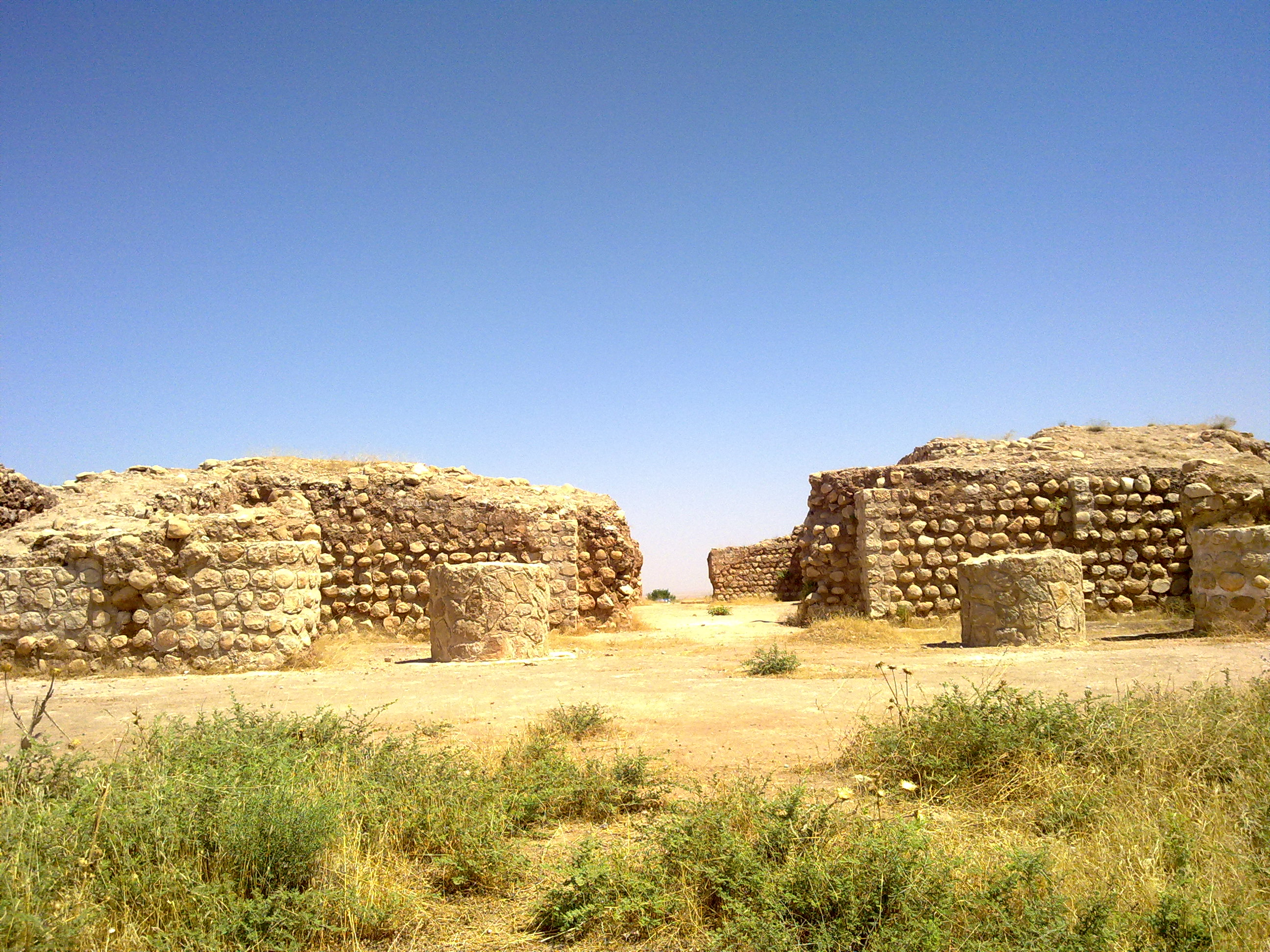
