= Road 17 (Iran) =

Road in Iran

Road 17
- جاده 17

Route information
- Length: 252 km (157 mi)

Major junctions
- From: Islamabad-e-gharb, Kermanshah; Road 48
- Road 21
- To: Mehran, Ilam; Road 64

Location
- Country: Iran
- Provinces: Kermanshah, Ilam
- Major cities: Eyvan, Ilam; Ilam, Ilam

Highway system
- Highways in Iran; Freeways

Road 17 is a road in western Iran connecting Kermanshah via Islamabad-e-gharb and Eyvan to Ilam and to Mehran.

== See also ==
- Ghalajeh tunnel
- Ghalajeh Protected Area
