= Road 37 (Iran) =

Road in Iran

Road 37
- جاده 37

Route information
- Part of AH2 AH8
- Length: 942 km (585 mi)

Major junctions
- From: Takestan, Qazvin; Road 32
- Road 38; Road 48; Freeway 6 Road 52; Road 56; Road 62; Road 39; Freeway 5 Road 19; Road 64
- To: Khorramshahr, Khuzestan; Road 96

Location
- Country: Iran
- Provinces: Qazvin, Hamedan, Lorestan, Khuzestan
- Major cities: Hamedan, Hamedan Malayer, Hamedan Borujerd, Lorestan; Khorramabad, Lorestan; Andimeshk, Khuzestan; Ahvaz, Khuzestan

Highway system
- Highways in Iran; Freeways

Road 37 is a road that connects Takestan to Khuzestan. Part of it is a part of Ahvaz-Tehran Highway.
