= Nal Shekan, Kurdistan =

Nal Shekan نعل شكن
- Village
- Location within Iran
- Coordinates: 35°48′38″N 46°50′13″E
- Country: Iran
- Province: Kurdistan
- County: Divandarreh
- Bakhsh: Saral
- Rural District: Saral

Population (2006)
  - Total: 228
- Time zone: UTC+3:30 (IRST)
  - Summer (DST): UTC+4:30 (IRDT)

Nal Shekan (Persian: نعل شكن, also Romanized as Na‘l Shekan) is a village in Saral Rural District, Saral District, Divandarreh County, Kurdistan Province, Iran. At the 2006 census, its population was 228, in 49 families. The village is populated by Kurds.
