= Road 52 (Iran) =

Road in Iran

Road 52
- جاده 52

Route information
- Length: 201 km (125 mi)

Major junctions
- From: Near Arak, Markazi; Road 37
- To: Near Kangavar, Kermanshah; Road 48

Location
- Country: Iran
- Provinces: Markazi, Hamedan, Kermanshah
- Major cities: Malayer, Hamedan ,Nahavand, Hamedan

Highway system
- Highways in Iran; Freeways

Road 52 is a road in western Iran connecting Arak to Malayer, Nahavand and Kangavar. This road is a transit road connecting Arak to western Iran.
