= Dowruzan =

Dowruzan دوروزان
- Village
- Location within Iran
- Coordinates: 35°07′40″N 49°35′36″E
- Country: Iran
- Province: Markazi
- County: Saveh
- Bakhsh: Nowbaran
- Rural District: Bayat

Population (2006)
  - Total: 132
- Time zone: UTC+3:30 (IRST)
  - Summer (DST): UTC+4:30 (IRDT)

Dowruzan (Persian: دوروزان, also Romanized as Dowrūzān; also known as Darvazān, Derūzān, Dorūzān, and Dūrzān) is a village in Bayat Rural District, Nowbaran District, Saveh County, Markazi Province, Iran. At the 2006 census, its population was 132, in 37 families.
