= Road 48 (Iran) =

Road in Iran

Road 48
- جاده 48

Route information
- Part of AH2
- Length: 604 km (375 mi)

Major junctions
- From: Saveh, Markazi; Freeway 5
- Road 65; Freeway 6 Road 37; Road 46; Road 52; Road 35; Road 21; Road 19; Road 17
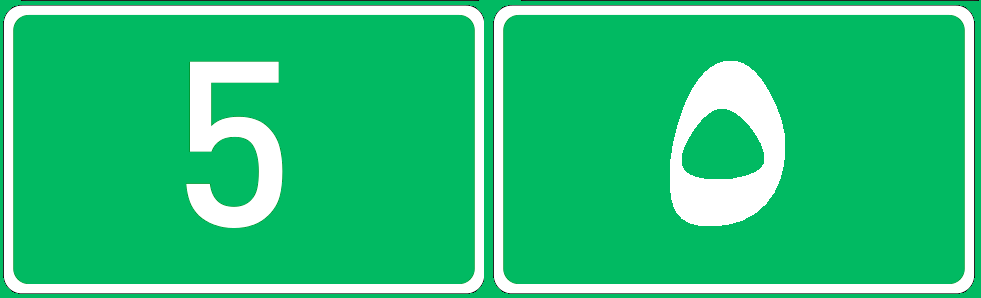
- To: Khosravi, Kermanshah; Iraq Highway 5 (Iraq)

Location
- Country: Iran
- Provinces: Markazi, Hamedan, Kermanshah
- Major cities: Hamedan, Hamedan; Bisotun, Kermanshah; Kermanshah, Kermanshah

Highway system
- Highways in Iran; Freeways

Road 48, unofficially called Karbala Highway, is in Markazi Province, Hamedan Province, and Kermanshah Province in western Iran.

It is very important for Iranian government and Iranian people, since many people go to Karbala and Najaf (two Shi'a holy cities) by this road. It reaches the Khosravi international border crossing with Iraq.

Freeway 6 runs parallel to the road from Saveh to Kurijan with plans to run parallel all the way to the border with Iraq at Khosravi. It is connected to M40 of the Arab Mashreq International Road Network.

== See also ==
- road 17
