= Khanaqin District (Diyala) =

Khanaqin District قضاء خانقين قەزای خانەقین
- District
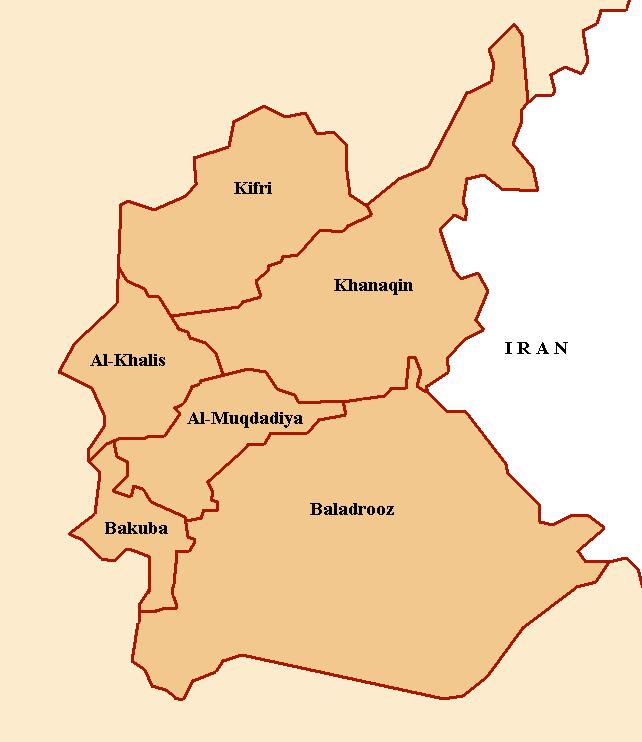
- Districts of Diyala Governorate
- Interactive map of Khanaqin District
- Country: Iraq
- Governorate: Diyala Governorate
- Seat: Khanaqin

Area
  - Total: 3,512 km^{2} (1,356 sq mi)

Population (2011)
  - Total: 350,000
- Time zone: UTC+3 (AST)

Khanaqin District (Arabic: قضاء خانقين, Kurdish: قەزای خانەقین/Qezay Xaneqîn) is a district in Diyala Governorate, Iraq. The district is a part of the Disputed territories of Northern Iraq.

Officially, according to the Federal government of Iraq, Khanaqin District belongs to Diyala Governorate. However, this district has been de facto split in two between Diyala Governorate and Sulaymaniyah Governorate (Kurdistan Region).

In effect, there exist two "Khanaqin Districts". There's one "Khanaqin District" in Diyala Governorate consisting of three subdistricts of Khanaqin Central Subdistrict (which includes the capital city Khanaqin), Al-Sadiyah Subdistrict, and Jalawla Subdistrict. There's another "Khanaqin District" which includes Qoratu Subdistrict and Maydan Subdistrict. Prior to 2015, under jurisdiction of Sulaymaniyah Governorate (Kurdistan Region), their portion of Khanaqin District was expanded to include Bamo Subdistrict. In 2015, this subdistrict joined Halabja District (Halabja Governorate).

The Alwand River runs through Khanaqin District before joining the Diyala River and to the south of the river lies the Khanaqin War Cemetery..

== Population ==
The district population was estimated to be 175,000 in 2003. The population of the Judicial Center increased from 20,000 in 2003 to more than 160,000 in 2011.
