= Garabad, Kurdistan =

Garabad گر آباد
- Village
- Location within Iran
- Coordinates: 35°04′35″N 47°01′57″E
- Country: Iran
- Province: Kurdistan
- County: Sanandaj
- Bakhsh: Central
- Rural District: Naran

Population (2006)
  - Total: 221
- Time zone: UTC+3:30 (IRST)
  - Summer (DST): UTC+4:30 (IRDT)

Garabad (Persian: گر آباد, also Romanized as Garābād; also known as Garāvah, Garāveh, and Garāwa) is a village in Naran Rural District, in the Central District of Sanandaj County, Kurdistan Province, Iran. At the 2006 census, its population was 221, in 43 families. The village is populated by Kurds.
