= Alwand River =

River in Kurdistan

Coordinates: 34°32′7″N 45°59′39″E

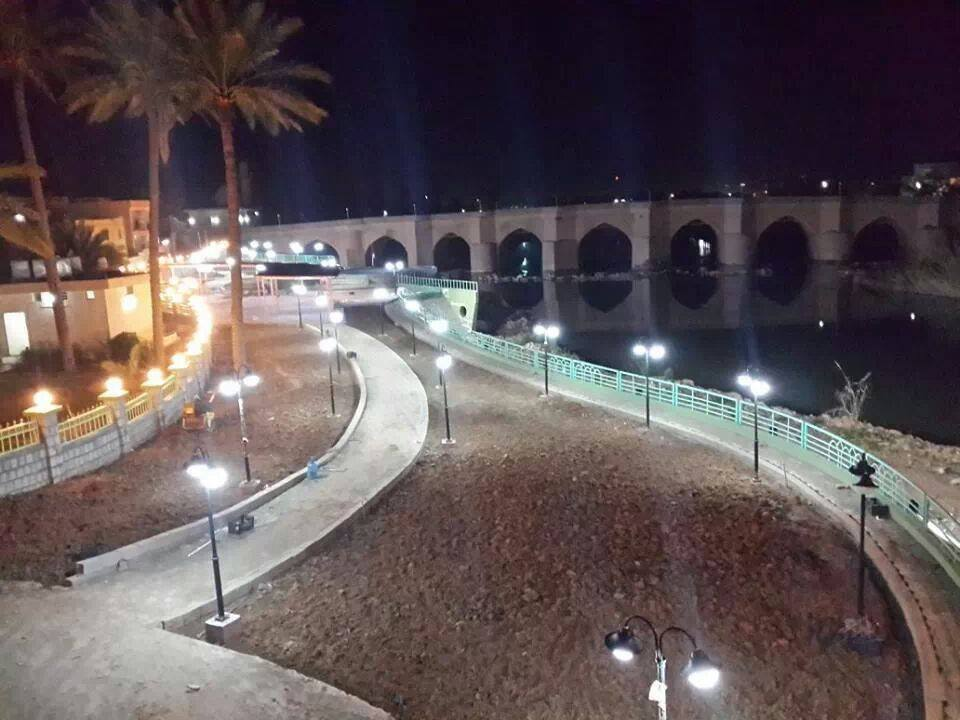
Alwand River in Khanaqin at night with the historical Alwand Bridge on top of it

The Alwand or Halwan (Arabic: نهر حلوان, Kurdish: Çemê Elwen ,ڕووباری ئەڵوەن, Persian: رود الوند) is a river in eastern Iraq and western Iran. It rises in the Zagros Mountains in Iran.

The river flows west from the mountains to the city of Qasr-e Shirin, where it turns south and crosses the border with Iraq. It then divides the city of Khanaqin in two parts. It has played a significant role in land cultivation and in establishment of a strong rural society in the area, and is considered by the people of Khanaqin a symbol for their unity and Kurdish identity.

The river joins the Diyala River at Zengabadh.

== Name ==
According to Vladimir Minorsky, the name "Alwand" is related to the name of the historical city of Hulwan, which lay on the river near the present-day city of Sarpol-e Zahab.

== Geography ==
The Alwand basin is located on the western side of the Zagros and covers an area of about 2,700 km^{2}. The climate of this region is semiarid to Mediterranean, with cool winters and dry summers. It receives an average of about 530 mm of rainfall per year. The region is characterized by karst terrain, and there are about 35 karst springs in the Alwand basin (12 major and 23 minor).

== Geology ==
The Alwand basin features seven main anticlines, which are separated from each other by synclines. About 36% of the basin is made up of carbonate formations, primarily the Asmari Formation. The Asmari Formation, which makes up the main body of the anticlines, consists of Tertiary dolomitic limestone and dolomite. Above it lie layers of the marl-and-sandstone Aghajari Formation or the gypsum-and-marl Gachasaran Formation. Below it is the Cretaceous Pabdeh-Gurpi Formation, which consists of marl and shale. Another carbonate formation, the Cretaceous Ilam Formation, is made of limestone and is only exposed in the Patagh anticline. The Asmari Formation, confined beneath the impermeable Aghajari and Gachasaran Formations, is the main aquifer in the Alwand basin.

== See also ==
- Alwand Dam
- Alwand refinery (1927)
