= Eslamabad-e Gharb =

City in Kermanshah province, Iran

Eslamabad-e Gharb Persian: اسلام‌آباد غرب
- City
- city view in 2023

- Location within Iran
- Coordinates: 34°06′37″N 46°31′39″E
- Country: Iran
- Province: Kermanshah
- County: Shahabad-e Gharb
- District: Central
- Elevation: 1,335 m (4,380 ft)

Population (2016)
  - Total: 90,559
- Time zone: UTC+3:30 (IRST)

Eslamabad-e Gharb (Persian: اسلام‌آباد غرب) (Note: Also romanized as Eslāmābād-e Gharb; also known as Eslāmābād, Şabad (Kurdish: شاباد), Shāhābād and Shāhābād-e Gharb) is a city in the Central District of Eslamabad-e Gharb County, Kermanshah province, Iran, serving as capital of both the county and the district. It is the second largest city in the province and is known for its oak trees. Prior to the 1979 Iranian Revolution, the city was known as Shahabad-e Gharb.

== Climate ==
Climate data for Eslamabad-e Gharb (1987-2005 normals)
Month	Jan	Feb	Mar	Apr	May	Jun	Jul	Aug	Sep	Oct	Nov	Dec	Year
Mean daily maximum °C (°F)	7.3 (45.1)	9.2 (48.6)	14.0 (57.2)	20.1 (68.2)	26.1 (79.0)	32.5 (90.5)	36.5 (97.7)	36.3 (97.3)	31.9 (89.4)	25.0 (77.0)	16.4 (61.5)	10.3 (50.5)	22.1 (71.8)
Daily mean °C (°F)	1.5 (34.7)	2.9 (37.2)	7.1 (44.8)	12.3 (54.1)	16.7 (62.1)	21.7 (71.1)	25.9 (78.6)	25.4 (77.7)	20.7 (69.3)	15.5 (59.9)	9.0 (48.2)	4.5 (40.1)	13.6 (56.5)
Mean daily minimum °C (°F)	−4.1 (24.6)	−3.5 (25.7)	0.2 (32.4)	4.4 (39.9)	7.4 (45.3)	10.9 (51.6)	15.3 (59.5)	14.6 (58.3)	9.6 (49.3)	6.1 (43.0)	1.6 (34.9)	−1.4 (29.5)	5.1 (41.2)
Average precipitation mm (inches)	75.3 (2.96)	67.7 (2.67)	98.4 (3.87)	49.2 (1.94)	19.1 (0.75)	1.3 (0.05)	0.9 (0.04)	0.0 (0.0)	0.7 (0.03)	22.6 (0.89)	69.2 (2.72)	79.2 (3.12)	483.6 (19.04)
Average precipitation days (≥ 0)	12.1	11.8	12.7	9.9	5.9	0.7	0.5	0.2	0.5	5.5	8.0	10.3	78.1
Average snowy days	6.8	5.2	1.9	0.2	0	0	0	0	0	0	0.5	2.8	17.4
Average relative humidity (%)	77	72	65	57	46	31	25	25	29	42	63	74	51
Average dew point °C (°F)	−3.1 (26.4)	−2.7 (27.1)	−0.2 (31.6)	3.0 (37.4)	3.9 (39.0)	3.1 (37.6)	4.2 (39.6)	3.5 (38.3)	1.0 (33.8)	1.1 (34.0)	0.8 (33.4)	−1.1 (30.0)	1.1 (34.0)
Mean monthly sunshine hours	155.7	168.6	210.4	233.6	305.4	357.0	357.5	352.3	316.3	257.8	197.7	155.9	3,068.2
Source: Iran Meteorological Organization(temperatures), (sun), (precipitation), (humidity and dew point), (snow days)

== Demographics ==
=== Language and ethnicity ===
The city is mainly populated by Kurds.

Eslamabad-e Gharb linguistic composition
language	percent
Kalhori Kurdish	80%
Gorani	10%
New Persian	8%
Laki	2%

=== Population ===
At the time of the 2006 National Census, the city's population was 89,430 in 20,956 households. The following census in 2011 counted 94,699 people in 25,673 households. The 2016 census measured the population of the city as 90,559 people in 26,503 households.

== Archeological Sites ==
32 kilometers southeast of Eslamabad-e Garb is the ruined chahartaq of Mil-e Milegeh, dating to the Sasanian Period.
