= Khanaqin =

Khanaqin Arabic: خانقين
- City
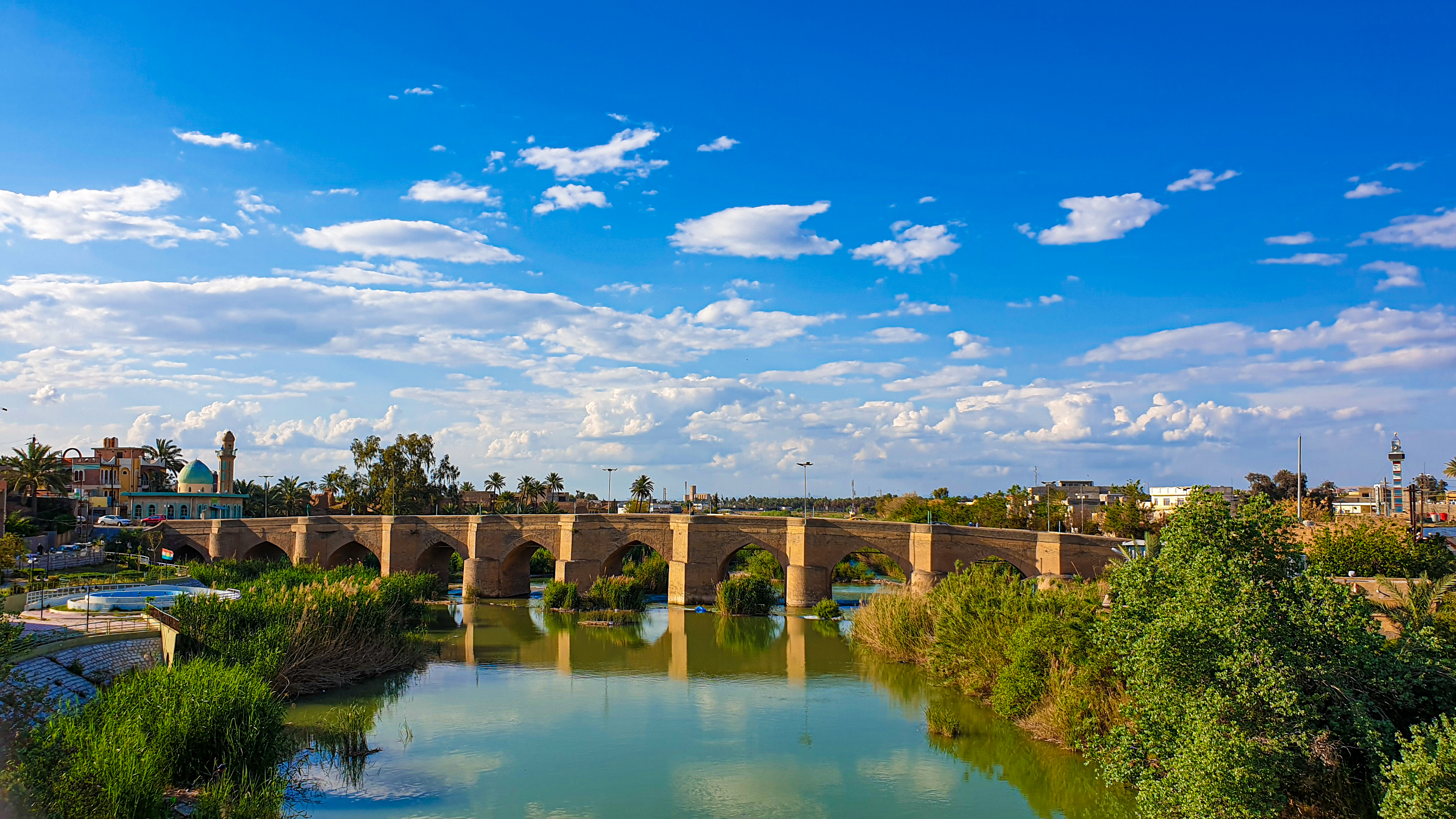
- Alwand River in Khanaqin with the historical Alwand Bridge on top of it

- Khanaqin's location inside Iraq
- Coordinates: 34°20′51″N 45°23′31″E
- Country: Iraq
- Governorate: Diyala Governorate
- District: Khanaqin
- Established: 1784
- Elevation: 183 m (602 ft)

Population (2008)
  - Total: 175,000
- Time zone: UTC+03:00 (AST)

Khanaqin (Arabic: خانقين; Kurdish: خانەقین, romanized: Xaneqîn) is the central city of Khanaqin District in Diyala Governorate, Iraq, near the Iranian border (8 km) on the Alwand tributary of the Diyala River. The town is populated by Kurds who speak the Southern Kurdish dialect. Khanaqin is situated on the main road which Shia pilgrims use when visiting holy Islamic cities. The city is rich in oil, and the first Iraqi oil refinery and oil pipeline was built nearby in 1927.

The city experienced Arabization during the Saddam era, but this has been substantially reversed after the fall of the regime in 2003 and remains disputed.

== History ==
In the early 11th century, the city was under the Banu Uqayl and later the Annazids until Ibrahim Inal captured the city around 1045. The Baban Emirate ruled Khanaqin for over a century and a half until the emirate collapsed in 1850.

The population of Khanaqin in the mid-19th century was small with only fifty Muslim and five Jewish households, with a significant Kurdish tribal population around the town. It had three mosques and three caravanserais. Khanaqin was a mere caravan station for caravans carrying Shia pilgrims before the Treaty of Erzurum in 1847 which made it a more significant frontier town between the Ottoman Empire and Qajar Iran. An immigration office was established just after the signing of the treaty to manage the growing pilgrimage. A customs house would later be established as well.

During the Persian Campaign, the Ottomans were attacked in Khanaqin on 3 June 1916 by Russian forces led by Nikolai Baratov but managed to push back the Russian cavalry. While the Ottomans lost about 300 men, the Russian casualties were greater. However, the Russians succeeded in capturing the town in April 1917 due to Ottoman weakness and the collapse of the Iranian government. Russia received support from the Kurdish tribes and allowed them to govern the area. Nonetheless, the Russian forces had to withdraw from the area in June 1917 due to the Russian Revolution which allowed the Ottomans to retake the town. The United Kingdom captured the city in December 1917 during their Mesopotamian campaign. After the capture, Britain approached the regional Kurdish tribes including Bajalan leader Mustafa Pasha Bajalan to consolidate their control. Khanaqin District was established in 1921.

Khanaqin saw no fighting during World War II but became an important base for Commonwealth forces and a field hospital was constructed in the town. Many Polish prisoners of war, who escaped Russia and attempted to link up with Commonwealth forces in Khanaqin, arrived at the town in September 1942. They would remain in the town but many perished and a cemetery was built in the town for them. Maintenance of the Khanaqin War Cemetery was later abandoned and a memorial was built in Baghdad. In 2020, the cemetery was damaged by 'extremists'.

The town experienced shelling by Iran during Iran–Iraq War in the 1980s and its people were displaced. Peshmerga captured the town in March 1991 during the uprisings in Iraq and again in April 2003 during the U.S. invasion of Iraq. In the December 2005 parliamentary election, the Democratic Patriotic Alliance of Kurdistan won the city with 99.4%. In the same year, locals protested and wanted Khanaqin to be a part of the Kurdistan Autonomous Region under PUK rule.

In September 2008, Peshmerga withdrew from the city allowing Iraqi police to control the city. The town experienced protests against the shuffle. As part of a compromise, Kurdistan Region was allowed to administer the city with Asayish presence, but Peshmerga would ultimately enter the city again in September 2011. Peshmerga withdrew from the city again in October 2017 which made the city witness frequent security breaches.

== Climate ==
Khanaqin has a hot semi-arid climate (Köppen BSh) with extremely hot, dry summers and mild to cool, slightly wet, winters.

Climate data for Khanaqin (1991–2020)
Month	Jan	Feb	Mar	Apr	May	Jun	Jul	Aug	Sep	Oct	Nov	Dec	Year
Mean daily maximum °C (°F)	16.6 (61.9)	18.7 (65.7)	23.3 (73.9)	29.8 (85.6)	37.1 (98.8)	42.9 (109.2)	45.5 (113.9)	45.7 (114.3)	41.2 (106.2)	34.5 (94.1)	24.7 (76.5)	18.5 (65.3)	31.5 (88.7)
Daily mean °C (°F)	10.1 (50.2)	12.2 (54.0)	16.3 (61.3)	22.5 (72.5)	29.2 (84.6)	34.4 (93.9)	36.7 (98.1)	36.1 (97.0)	31.5 (88.7)	25.5 (77.9)	17.0 (62.6)	12.0 (53.6)	23.6 (74.5)
Mean daily minimum °C (°F)	5.4 (41.7)	6.5 (43.7)	10.1 (50.2)	15.5 (59.9)	22.1 (71.8)	25.6 (78.1)	27.7 (81.9)	27.2 (81.0)	23.1 (73.6)	18.5 (65.3)	11.0 (51.8)	6.6 (43.9)	16.6 (61.9)
Average precipitation mm (inches)	52.8 (2.08)	40.6 (1.60)	43.4 (1.71)	31.2 (1.23)	6.1 (0.24)	0.0 (0.0)	0.0 (0.0)	0.0 (0.0)	0.1 (0.00)	18.7 (0.74)	50.1 (1.97)	42.5 (1.67)	285.5 (11.24)
Average relative humidity (%)	76.4	69.3	59.4	50.2	37.1	26.9	25.6	26.1	30.4	40.0	61.5	73.1	48.0
Source: NOAA

== Demographics ==
=== Ethnicity ===
In 1947, out of the 25,700 people in the town, 20,560 (80%) were Kurds. In the 1957 census, Kurds constituted 74.6% of the population, while Arabs were 23.7% and the Turkmen population stood at 1.6%. In 1965, the numbers stood at 72.1%, 26.2% and 1.7% for Kurds, Arabs and Turkmen, respectively.

During the 1970s, the Arabization efforts by Iraq intensified, and the 1977 census showed that the Arab population had become 47.5% of the population, while Kurds were 45% and Turkmens, 6.1%. In 1987, the Arab population stood at 49.5%, the Kurdish population at 45.8% and the Turkmen population at 4.7%. In 1997, Arabs were 54.7% of the population, while Kurds were 39.4% and Turkmen were 5.8%.

The Arabization of Khanaqin was almost entirely reversed after 2003 by the PUK. Khanaqin mayor Muhammad Amin Hassan Hussein stated in 2014 that the Arab population fell to 1% in 2003.

The main tribes of Khanaqin include Kalhor, Hamawand, Zand, Malekshahi Suramiri, Arkavazi and Zangana.

=== Religion ===
The majority of Khanaqin are Shia Muslims but a significant Sunni Muslim minority also exists. In 2020, one Christian remained in the city, as well as some Yarsans.

== Alwand Bridge ==
Alwand Bridge is located in the center of Khanaqin and on the Alwand River. The Sassanids founded this bridge, which during the Sassanid era was 150 meters wide and 6 meters tall.

The current version of the bridge was built in 1860 by Dowlatshah, the former governor of Kermanshah. He went to Khanaqin in 1855 on his way to visit the Shia holy sites in Karbala and Najaf, but that year he faced a severe flood and decided to spend his travel expenses in addition to the additional costs of building a bridge in Khanaqin. He brought a number of architects from Isfahan to Khanaqin and the bridge was built using walnut wood imported from Iran.

== Jewish community ==
Khanaqin had a Jewish community until the early 1950s when they were forced to migrate to Israel. In the middle of the 19th century, about 20 Jewish families lived in the town. This number increased to 700 individuals shortly after. The languages spoken by the community was Mlahso Aramaic. By the 1920s, the community was introduced to Zionism and most would leave for Israel after the community leader was arrested in August 1949.

== Notable people ==
- Fuad Hussein
- Leyla Qasim
- Mala Bakhtiyar
- Ovadia Eli
- Imad Ahmad Sayfour

== See also ==
- List of largest cities in Iraq
- Khosravi
