= Sumar Rural District =

Rural district in Kermanshah province, Iran

Sumar Rural District Persian: دهستان سومار
- Rural District
- Location within Iran
- Coordinates: 34°02′25″N 45°35′25″E
- Country: Iran
- Province: Kermanshah
- County: Qasr-e Shirin
- District: Sumar

Population (2016)
  - Total: 377
- Time zone: UTC+3:30 (IRST)

Sumar Rural District (Persian: دهستان سومار) is in Sumar District of Qasr-e Shirin County, Kermanshah province, Iran.

== Demographics ==
=== Population ===
At the time of the 2006 National Census, the rural district's population was 227 in 64 households. There were 1,515 inhabitants in 80 households at the following census of 2011. The 2016 census measured the population of the rural district as 377 in 36 households. The most populous of its 30 villages was Naft Shahr, with 184 people.
