= Sumar District =

District in Kermanshah province, Iran

Sumar District Persian: بخش سومار
- District
- Location within Iran
- Coordinates: 34°02′25″N 45°35′25″E
- Country: Iran
- Province: Kermanshah
- County: Qasr-e Shirin
- Capital: Sumar

Population (2016)
  - Total: 557
- Time zone: UTC+3:30 (IRST)

Sumar District (Persian: بخش سومار) is in Qasr-e Shirin County, Kermanshah province, Iran. Its capital is the city of Sumar.

== Demographics ==
=== Population ===
At the time of the 2006 National Census, the district's population was 247 in 79 households. The following census in 2011 counted 1,524 people in 85 households. The 2016 census measured the population of the district as 557 inhabitants in 45 households.

=== Administrative divisions ===
Sumar District Population
Administrative Divisions	2006	2011	2016
Sumar RD	227	1,515	377
Sumar (city)	20	9	180
Total	247	1,524	557
RD = Rural District

== See also ==
- Boli Rural District
