= Nasrabad Rural District (Qasr-e Shirin County) =

Rural district in Kermanshah province, Iran

Nasrabad Rural District Persian: دهستان نصرآباد
- Rural District
- Location within Iran
- Coordinates: 34°23′48″N 45°39′58″E
- Country: Iran
- Province: Kermanshah
- County: Qasr-e Shirin
- District: Central
- Capital: Seyyed Sohrab

Population (2016)
  - Total: 1,508
- Time zone: UTC+3:30 (IRST)

Nasrabad Rural District (Persian: دهستان نصرآباد) is in the Central District of Qasr-e Shirin County, Kermanshah province, Iran. Its capital is the village of Seyyed Sohrab.

== Demographics ==
=== Population ===
At the time of the 2006 National Census, the rural district's population was 1,899 in 489 households. There were 2,249 inhabitants in 430 households at the following census of 2011. The 2016 census measured the population of the rural district as 1,508 in 409 households. The most populous of its 21 villages was Karak Harak, with 317 people.
