= Fathabad Rural District (Qasr-e Shirin County) =

Rural district in Kermanshah province, Iran

Fathabad Rural District Persian: دهستان فتح آباد
- Rural District
- Location within Iran
- Coordinates: 34°32′13″N 45°38′58″E
- Country: Iran
- Province: Kermanshah
- County: Qasr-e Shirin
- District: Central
- Capital: Aqa Berar

Population (2016)
  - Total: 2,537
- Time zone: UTC+3:30 (IRST)

Fathabad Rural District (Persian: دهستان فتح آباد) is in the Central District of Qasr-e Shirin County, Kermanshah province, Iran. Its capital is the village of Aqa Berar.

== Demographics ==
=== Population ===
At the time of the 2006 National Census, the rural district's population was 2,222 in 530 households. There were 3,082 inhabitants in 762 households at the following census of 2011. The 2016 census measured the population of the rural district as 2,537 in 779 households. The most populous of its 29 villages was Seyyed Ayaz, with 406 people.
