= Central District (Qasr-e Shirin County) =

District in Kermanshah province, Iran

Central District (Qasr-e Shirin County) Persian: بخش مرکزی شهرستان قصر شیرین
- District
- Location within Iran
- Coordinates: 34°25′43″N 45°37′03″E
- Country: Iran
- Province: Kermanshah
- County: Qasr-e Shirin
- Capital: Qasr-e Shirin

Population (2016)
  - Total: 22,702
- Time zone: UTC+3:30 (IRST)

The Central District of Qasr-e Shirin County (Persian: بخش مرکزی شهرستان قصر شیرین) is in Kermanshah province, Iran. Its capital is the city of Qasr-e Shirin.

== Demographics ==
=== Population ===
At the time of the 2006 National Census, the district's population was 19,574 in 4,920 households. The following census in 2011 counted 23,665 people in 5,984 households. The 2016 census measured the population of the district as 22,702 inhabitants in 6,688 households.

=== Administrative divisions ===
Central District (Qasr-e Shirin County) Population
| Administrative Divisions | 2006 | 2011 | 2016 |
|---|---|---|---|
| Alvand RD | 16 | 375 | 184 |
| Fathabad RD | 2,222 | 3,082 | 2,537 |
| Nasrabad RD | 1,899 | 2,249 | 1,508 |
| Qasr-e Shirin (city) | 15,437 | 17,959 | 18,473 |
| Total | 19,574 | 23,665 | 22,702 |
RD = Rural District
