= Qasr-e Shirin County =

County in Kermanshah province, Iran

Qasr-e Shirin County Persian: شهرستان قصر شیرین
- County
- Location of Qasr-e Shirin County in Kermanshah province (left, yellow)

- Location of Kermanshah province in Iran
- Coordinates: 34°09′N 45°36′E
- Country: Iran
- Province: Kermanshah
- Capital: Qasr-e Shirin
- Districts: Central, Sumar

Population (2016)
  - Total: 23,929
- Time zone: UTC+3:30 (IRST)

Qasr-e Shirin County (Persian: شهرستان قصر شیرین) is in Kermanshah province, Iran. Its capital is the city of Qasr-e Shirin.

== Demographics ==
=== Population ===
At the time of the 2006 National Census, the county's population was 19,821 in 4,999 households. The following census in 2011 counted 25,517 people in 6,058 households. The 2016 census measured the population of the county as 23,929 in 6,903 households.

=== Administrative divisions ===
Qasr-e Shirin County's population history and administrative structure over three consecutive censuses are shown in the following table.

Qasr-e Shirin County Population
Administrative Divisions	2006	2011	2016
Central District	19,574	23,665	22,702
Alvand RD	16	375	184
Fathabad RD	2,222	3,082	2,537
Nasrabad RD	1,899	2,249	1,508
Qasr-e Shirin (city)	15,437	17,959	18,473
Sumar District	247	1,524	557
Sumar RD	227	1,515	377
Sumar (city)	20	9	180
Total	19,821	25,517	23,929
RD = Rural District

== See also ==
- Sarpol-e Zahab County
- Gilan-e Gharb County

Media related to Qasr-e Shirin County at Wikimedia Commons
