= Iran route numbering system =

Iran route numbering system is a network of highways and roads in Iran that is managed by Iran Road Maintenance & Transportation Organization. The network comprises main highways and several major and minor country roads.

== Route signs ==
blue on motorways, green on other roads. 3-digit numbers appear in black on a white rectangle

Common route signs used in Iran

Freeway marker

Expressway marker

Road marker

== Routes ==
=== Asian Highways ===
- AH1
- AH2
- AH8
- AH70
- AH71
- AH72
- AH75
- AH78
- AH82
- AH88

=== Motorway (Freeway) ===
Numbers roughly increase from west to east .

- Freeway 1 (Qazvin-Rasht Freeway)
- Freeway 2
- Freeway 3 (Tehran-Shomal Freeway)
- Freeway 5
- Freeway 6 (Saveh-Hamedan Freeway), (Hamedan-Kermanshah-Khosravi) planned
- Freeway 7
- Freeway 9 (Mo'allem Freeway) (Isfahan-Shahinshahr Freeway)
- Freeway 16 (Tabriz-Urmia Freeway) Partly built
- Freeway 24 (Maragheh-Hashtrud Freeway) Partly Built
- Freeway 51 (Zobahan Freeway)

==== Bypasses ====
A most of the bypass freeways are part of the one-digit motorways (Such as Tehran Southern bypass is part of the freeway 2, Isfahan bypasses are part of the freeway 7, and Arak northern bypass is a part of freeway 5.) but there are a few bypasses that they are not part of the one-digit freeways. and they are only known freeways with the same number.

- Freeway 21 (Tehran Eastern Bypass) Partly built
- Freeway 56 (Qom Western Bypass) Partly built
- Freeway 96 (Bandar Mahshahr Northern Bypass)

=== National highway ===
Odd numbers (11-99) generally denote north-south routes, while even numbers (12-98) denote east-west routes. Numbers increase in eastbound and southbound direction respectively. There are some A roads without a national number. Motorways do not have national numbers. 3-digit numbers are derived from 2-digit numbers by adding a digit at the end.

- Road 71 (Tehran-Qom Highway)
- Road 65 (Tehran-Saveh Highway)
- Road 22 (Coastal Road of Caspian Sea)
- Road 79 (Sevad Kooh RD) (Sari-Tehran) Some parts of it under construction
- Road 77 (Haraz Road)
- Road 62 (Esfahan-KhorramAbad Esfahan-Yazd)
- Road 65 (Tehran-Isfahan Highway)
- Road 86 (Shiraz-Kerman Shiraz-Ahvaz)
- Road 22 Turkmenistan-Mashhad-Mazandaran
- Road 36 Bardaskan-Taybad
- Road 44 (Tehran Highway) Tehran-Mashhad
- Road 16 (Azerbaijan lake Bridge)
