= Freeway 7 (Iran) =

Road in Iran

Freeway 7
- 7 آزادراه
- Khalij Fars-Amirkabir and Tehran-Esfahan Freeway
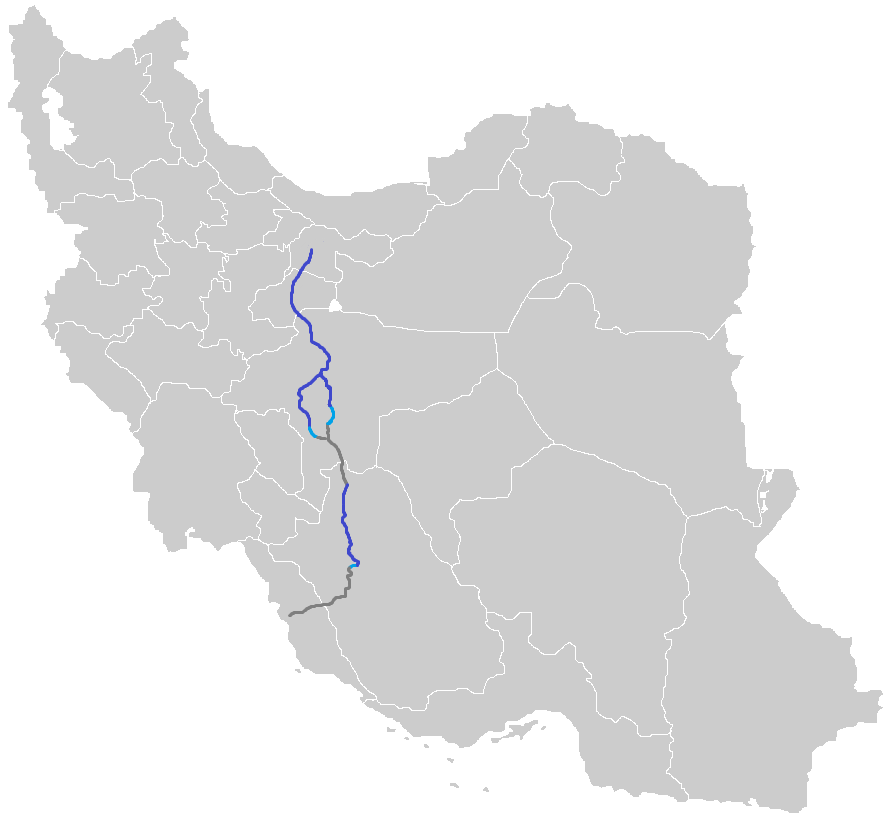

Route information
- Part of AH72, AH88 (Bandar Abbas-Shahid Rajaee Port section only)
- Length: 995 km (618 mi)

Major junctions
- From: Tehran, Tehran; Kazemi Expressway; Azadegan Expressway
- Northern Behesht-e Zahra Expressway; Road 71; Freeway 2 Road 56; Road 51; Road 58; Road 65; Road 47; Road 62; Road 78; Road 94; Road 96; Zobahan Freeway
- To: Shiraz, Fars; Road 67

Location
- Country: Iran
- Provinces: Tehran, Qom, Isfahan, Fars
- Major cities: Qom, Qom; Kashan, Isfahan; Natanz, Isfahan; Najafabad, Isfahan; Izadkhast, Fars; Beyza, Fars; Shiraz, Fars

Highway system
- Highways in Iran; Freeways

Freeway 7 (Persian: آزادراه ۷) (also known as Persian Gulf Highway-آزادراه خلیج فارس) is a freeway in central Iran. It starts from Jahad Square at the south end of Kazemi Expressway and Azadegan Expressway in Tehran. It then passes Behesht-e Zahra, Imam Khomeini Int'l, Qom, Kashan, Natanz, Shahinshahr, Najafabad and currently ends at the northeast of Zarrinshahr in a junction with Road 51 and Zobahan Freeway. However, there has been construction after the junction and so far, 7 kilometres (4.3 mi) has been completed. In recent years, construction has been made in order to connect this freeway to Shiraz under the name Esfahan-Shiraz Freeway, which starts from Izadkhast and currently ends at the northwest of Shiraz in a junction with Road 67, and it is planned to end in Hosseini Al-Hashemi Expressway (in final phases). It was opened in Mehr 1402 (October 2023). The Freeway from Isfahan to Izadkhast is currently planned, but yet to start construction. There are also plans to connect the freeway to Bushehr.

== Tehran-Shiraz section ==
- Tehran – Qom:5000 IRR

From North to South
Continues as: Kazemi Expressway
Azadegan Expressway
Tehran; Municipal District 19
Khalazir
Palain
Islamic Azad University of Shahr Rey
Northern Behesht-e Zahra Expressway; Towards: Shahr-e Aftab Metro Station
Tehran Toll Station
Kahrizak
Atre Yas Service Station
Tehran Second Southern Bypass Expressway
Hasanabad; Robat Karim
Tehran Imam Khomeini International Airport
Road 71
Hafezieh Service Station
Tehran Southern bypass freeway (Ghadir freeway); North to Abyek-Ghazvin-Tabriz; South to Charmshahr-Mashhad
Tehran province Qom province
Road 71
Haft Aseman Service Station
Maral-e Setare-e Hoz Soltan Service Station; Industrial park
Qom Western Bypass Freeway
Behesht-e Ma'sumeh Cemetery
Qom-North Toll Station
Road 56; Qom; Towards Road 71
Qom
Qom-South Toll Station
Qom-Garmsar Freeway; Towards Charmshahr-Varamin-Garmsar-Semnan-Mashhad
Road 71
Maral Setareh Service Station
Qom province Isfahan province
CNG Station
Khozaq; Ravand
Road 58
Kashan-North Toll Station
Imam Reza Boulevard; Kashan
Kashan; Qamsar
Kashan-South Toll Station
Nasrabad; Kashan Air Base
Mahtab Service Station
Kashan; Natanz
Kashan; Badrud
Road 71
Kashan; Natanz
Road 665
Isfahan Eastern Bypass Freeway; Towards Isfahan Shahid Beheshti International Airport-Esfahan-Shiraz
Pardis-e Kavir Service Station
Murcheh-Khort Toll Station
Road 65; North to Meimeh-Delijan-Salafchegan; South to Shahinshahr-Esfahan
Road 47; West to Alavijeh
Service Station
Road 62; West to Tiran-Khorramabad-Ahvaz; Najafabad Northern Ring Expressway; Najafabad Southern Ring Expressway
Najafabad Toll Station
Fuladshahr
Zobahan Freeway; North to Fuladshahr-Falavarjan-Esfahan; Road 51; South to Zarrinshahr-Shahrekord; Esfahan Steel Company (Zobahan)
Zarrinshahr Toll Station
Zarrinshahr; Dizicheh
Imam Khomeini Blvd; Mobarakeh
Fulad Expressway; Mo'allem Blvd. Azadegan Blvd. Karkevand-Mobarakeh-Varnamkhast
Under Construction
Road 65
Isfahan province Fars province
Under Construction
Road 65; North to Shahreza-Esfahan-Tehran; South to Izadkhast-Abadeh-Persepolis-Shiraz
Izadkhast Toll Station
Service Station
Abadeh-Semirom Road; East to Abadeh-Abarkuh-Shiraz; West to Semirom-Shahreza-Esfahan-Tehran
Road 78; East to Eqlid-Abarkuh-Persepolis-Shiraz; West to Yasuj-Sisakht
Kamfiruz
Banesh; Towards Beyza-Tang-e Khiareh
Beyza Toll Station
Beyza-Shiraz Road; East to Shiraz-Yasuj; West to Tang-e Khiareh-Lapui-Marvdasht-Persepolis
Under Construction
From South to North

== Isfahan Eastern Bypass section ==
From North to South
Natanz-Esfahan Freeway (Freeway 7) east to Natanz-Kashan-Tehran west to Esfahan
Donbi
Payambare A'zam Expressway
Esfahan-Ardestan road
Habibabad
Ardestani (airport) Expressway; Isfahan International Airport
Qahjavarestan
Esfahan-Naein road
Under Construction
From South to North

== Bandar Abbas-Port of Shahid Rajaee section ==
From North to South
Under Construction
Continues as: Road 71; North to Sirjan
	Road 71; East to Bandar Abbas-Sirjan-Tehran
	Dozak
	Tahlu
	Road 94; East to Bandar Abbas-Sirjan; West to Lar
	Shohada Blvd; Towards Bandar Abbas
	Tazian-e Pain; Shohada Blvd
	Tall-e Siah
	Shahid Rajaee Highway
Bandar Abbas
Service Station
Bandar Abbas Toll Station
	Kalatu
Daryache Shahrdari Square	Road 96; Towards Port of Shahid Rajaee
From South to North

== See also ==
- Freeways in Iran
