= Isfahan Eastern Bypass Freeway =

Isfahan Eastern Bypass Freeway
- آزادراه کنارگذر شرقی اصفهان
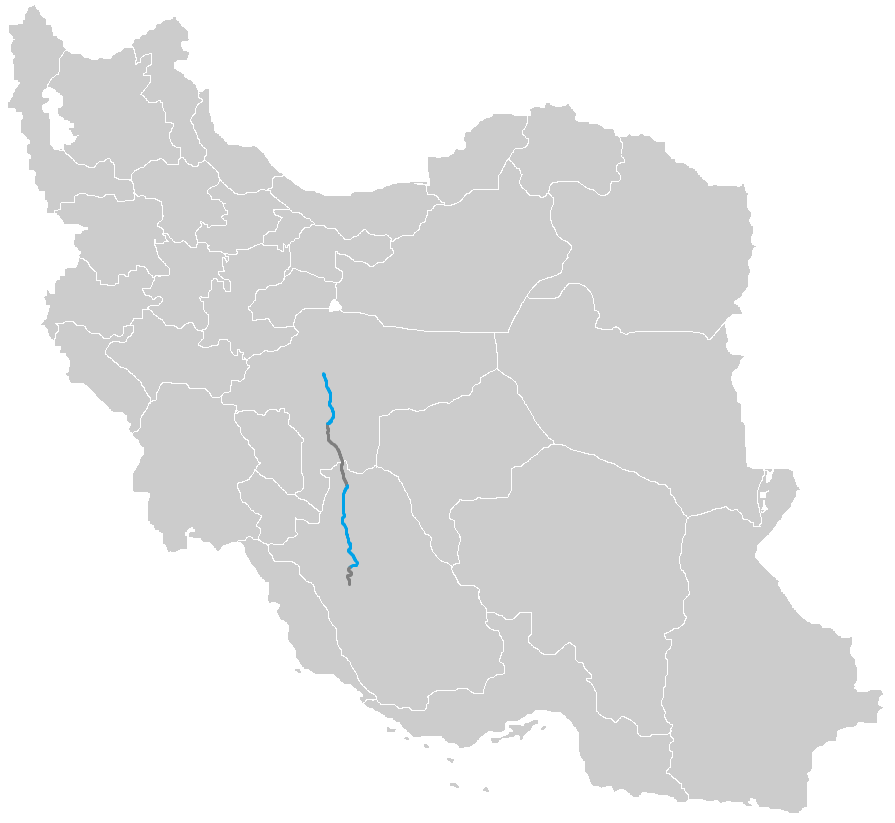

Route information
- Part of AH72 (When Completed)
- Length: 90 km (56 mi)

Major junctions
- From: Freeway 7
- Road 656; Ardestani Expressway; Road 62
- To: Baharestan, Isfahan; Road 65; Will be continued as Freeway 7 Isfahan-Shiraz Freeway

Location
- Country: Iran
- Provinces: Isfahan
- Major cities: Komeshcheh, Isfahan; Habibabad, Isfahan; Qahjavarestan, Isfahan; Gavart, Isfahan; Isfahan, Isfahan; Baharestan, Isfahan

Highway system
- Highways in Iran; Freeways

Isfahan Eastern Bypass Freeway (Persian: آزادراه کنارگذر شرقی اصفهان) is a freeway in Greater Isfahan Region, Isfahan, central Iran, bypassing the city of Isfahan on its eastern side. Section 1 and 2 of this Freeway was completed in 2020 and section 3 of freeway is currently under construction.

== Development ==
Islamic republic military and ministry of defense and logistics have partnered with ministry of road and urban development have a forty percent share of profits and investment.

== route ==
from north to south
Natanz-Esfahan Freeway (Freeway 7) east to Natanz-Kashan-Tehran west to Esfahan
Donbi
Payambare A'zam Expressway
Esfahan-Ardestan road
Habibabad
Ardestani (airport) Expressway; Isfahan International Airport
Qahjavarestan
Esfahan-Naein road
Under Construction
from south to north
