= Agharabparast Expressway =

Agharab Parast Expressway
- بزرگراه آقارب پرست
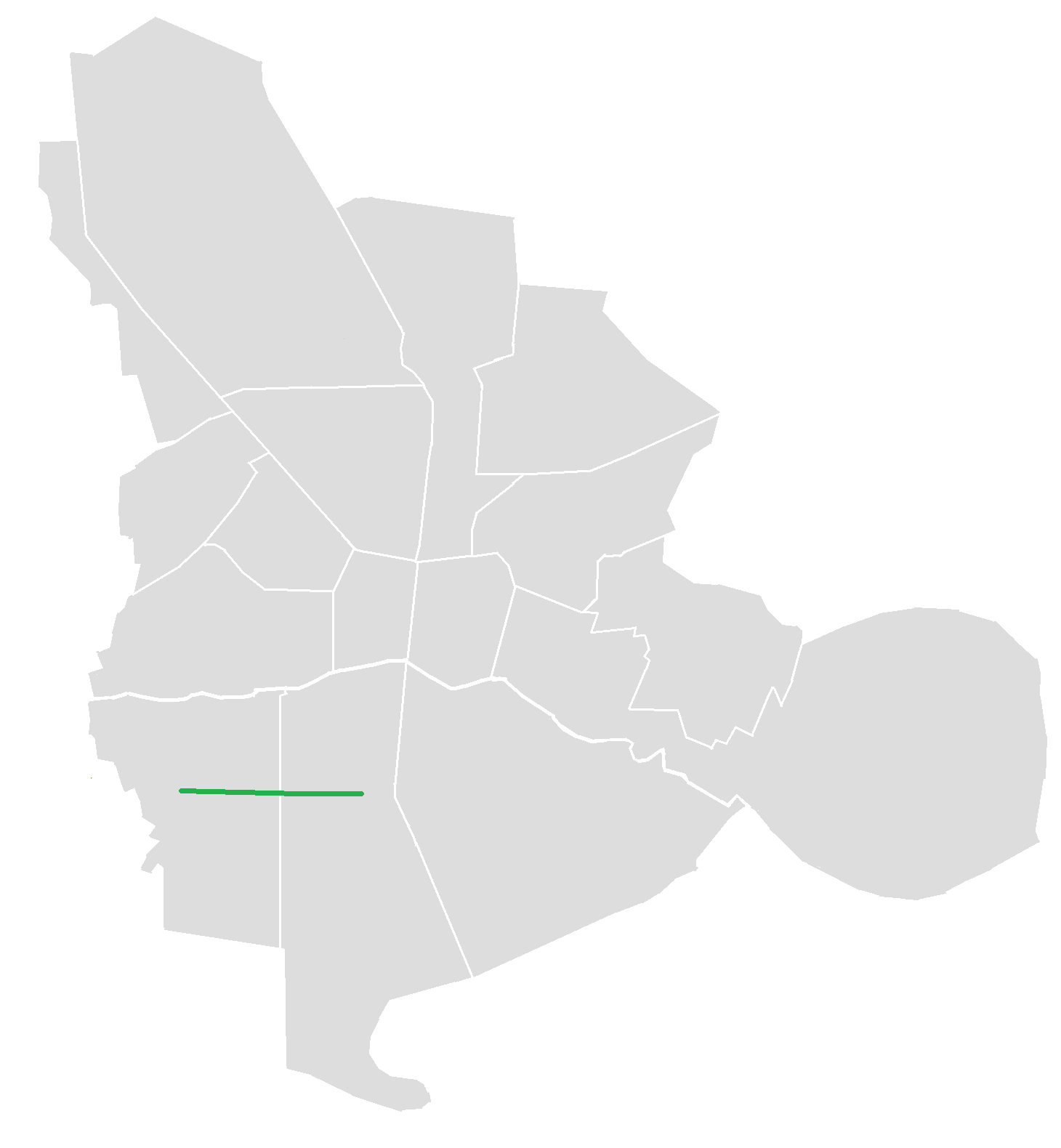

Route information
- Length: 5.9 km (3.7 mi)

Major junctions
- East end: Shohadaye Soffeh Expressway; Shohadaye Soffeh Street
- West end: Dorcheh Road; Kazemi Boulevard; Zobahan Freeway

Location
- Country: Iran
- Major cities: Esfahan

Highway system
- Highways in Iran; Freeways

Agharabparast Expressway is an expressway in southern Isfahan, Iran. It connects Shahrekord Expressway to Shiraz Expressway.

From East to West
Continues as: Shohadaye Soffeh Expressway
Shohadaye Soffeh Street
Janbazan Street
Shahid Meysami Expressway
Kazemi Boulevard; Zobahan Freeway
Continues as: Ayatollah Dorcheh-i Boulevard
From West to East
