= Road 55 (Iran) =

Road in Iran

Road 55
- جاده 55

Route information
- Part of AH72
- Length: 547 km (340 mi)

Major junctions
- From: Bushehr, Bushehr
- Road 96; Road 86; Road 86; Road 67; Road 78; Road 63; Road 72; Road 53
- To: 32 km South Isfahan, Isfahan; Road 65

Location
- Country: Iran
- Provinces: Bushehr, Fars, Kogiluyeh and Boyer-Ahmad, Isfahan
- Major cities: Nur Abad, Fars; Yasuj, Kogiluyeh and Boyer-Ahmad; Borujen, Chahar Mahal and Bakhtiyari; Mobarakeh, Isfahan

Highway system
- Highways in Iran; Freeways

Road 55 connects Persian Gulf and Bushehr to Isfahan and central Iran to Road 65. The road is of a national importance with regard to transit, as it is the shortest and fastest link connecting Isfahan and places north of it with Bushehr and Asaluyeh on the coast of Persian Gulf
