= Road 72 (Iran) =

Road in Iran

Road 72
- جاده 72

Route information
- Length: 503 km (313 mi) The western 47 km (29 mi) is in common with Road 86

Major junctions
- From: Shahreza, Esfahan; Road 65
- Road 55; Road 53; Road 51; Road 45; Road 86; Freeway 5
- To: Ahvaz, Khuzestan; Road 37

Location
- Country: Iran
- Provinces: Esfahan, Chaharmahal and Bakhtiari, Khuzestan
- Major cities: Borujen, Chaharmahal and Bakhtiari; Izeh, Khuzestan; Ramhormoz, Khuzestan

Highway system
- Highways in Iran; Freeways

Road 72 is a transit road connecting southwest Iran to central Iran. It passes Borujen, Mountainous areas of Zagros, Karun 3 dam, Izeh, Baghmalek and Ramhormoz then it goes into Road 86 and reaches Ahvaz. It is within Isfahan Province, Chaharmahal and Bakhtiari Province, and Khuzestan Province.
