= List of highways numbered 72 =

The following highways are numbered 72:

== International ==
- AH72 Asian Highway 72
- E72 European route E72

== Australia ==
- Snowy Mountains Highway

== Canada ==
- Alberta Highway 72
- Newfoundland and Labrador Route 72
- Highway 72 (Ontario)

== China ==
- G72 Expressway

== Cuba ==
- Matanzas–La Lanza Road (3–72)

== Greece ==
- EO72 road

== Iran ==
- Road 72

== Italy ==
- State road 72

== Korea, South ==
- National Route 72

== New Zealand ==
- Inland Scenic Route

== United States ==
- Interstate 72
- U.S. Route 72
- Alabama State Route 72
  - County Route 72 (Lee County, Alabama)
- Arizona State Route 72
- Arkansas Highway 72
- California State Route 72
- Colorado State Highway 72
- Connecticut Route 72
- Delaware Route 72
- Florida State Road 72
- Georgia State Route 72
  - Georgia State Route 72 (1930–1941) (former)
- Hawaii Route 72
- Idaho State Highway 72
- Illinois Route 72
- Kentucky Route 72
- Louisiana Highway 72
  - Louisiana State Route 72 (former)
- Maryland Route 72 (former)
- M-72 (Michigan highway)
- Minnesota State Highway 72
  - County Road 72 (Ramsey County, Minnesota)
- Missouri Route 72
- Montana Highway 72
- Nebraska Highway 72 (former)
- Nevada State Route 72 (former)
- New Jersey Route 72
  - County Route 72 (Bergen County, New Jersey)
  - County Route 72 (Ocean County, New Jersey)
- New Mexico State Road 72
- New York State Route 72
  - County Route 72 (Cattaraugus County, New York)
  - County Route 72 (Chautauqua County, New York)
  - County Route 72 (Dutchess County, New York)
  - County Route 72 (Essex County, New York)
  - County Route 72 (Jefferson County, New York)
  - County Route 72 (Livingston County, New York)
  - County Route 72 (Madison County, New York)
  - County Route 72 (Montgomery County, New York)
  - County Route 72 (Orange County, New York)
  - County Route 72 (Putnam County, New York)
  - County Route 72 (Rockland County, New York)
  - County Route 72 (Suffolk County, New York)
- North Carolina Highway 72
- Ohio State Route 72
- Oklahoma State Highway 72
  - Oklahoma State Highway 72 (1930s) (former)
- Pennsylvania Route 72
- South Carolina Highway 72
- Tennessee State Route 72
- Texas State Highway 72
  - Texas State Highway Spur 72
  - Farm to Market Road 72
  - Texas Park Road 72
- Utah State Route 72
- Virginia State Route 72
- West Virginia Route 72
- Wisconsin Highway 72
- Wyoming Highway 72

Territories

- U.S. Virgin Islands Highway 72

== See also ==
- List of highways numbered 72A
- A72 (disambiguation)

Preceded by 71	Lists of highways 72	Succeeded by 73
