= Road 39 (Iran) =

Road in Iran

Road 39
- جاده 39
- Abadan-Ahvaz Expressway

Route information
- Length: 284 km (176 mi)

Major junctions
- From: Andimeshk, Khuzestan; Road 37
- Road 72
- To: Abadan, Khuzestan; Road 96

Location
- Country: Iran
- Provinces: Khuzestan
- Major cities: Dezful, Khuzestan; Shushtar, Khuzestan; Ahvaz, Khuzestan

Highway system
- Highways in Iran; Freeways

Road 39 is a road in Khuzestan. All of this road is expressway. It connects Abadan to Ahvaz and it is used for transit from Abadan port. Then it goes to Shushtar, Northeast of Ahvaz. After that it goes north to Dezful. And at last it goes to north to Andimeshk via expressway.
