= Shohadaye Soffeh Expressway =

Shohada-ye Soffe Expressway
- بزرگراه شهدای صفه
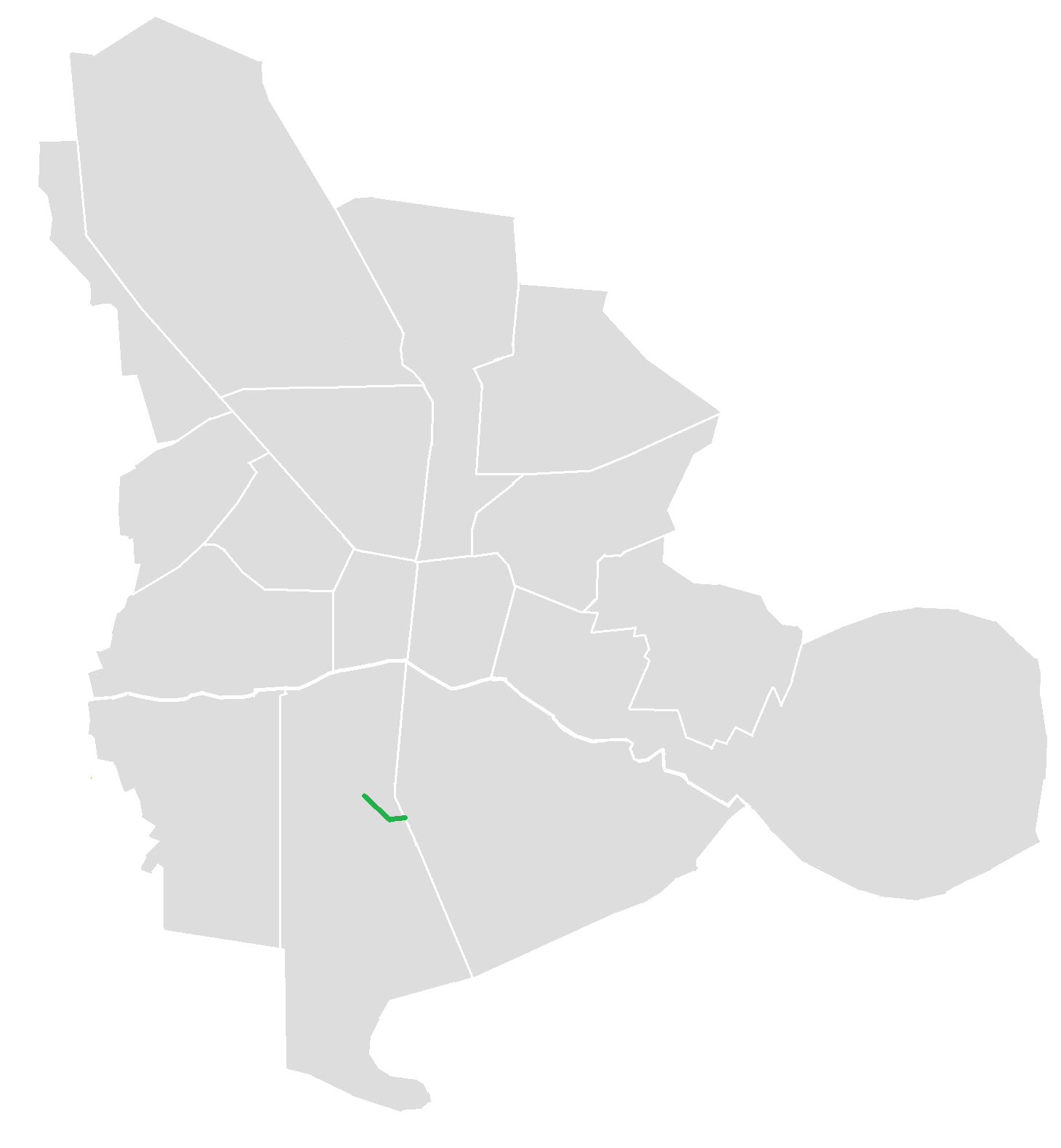

Route information
- Length: 2.4 km (1.5 mi)

Major junctions
- East end: Shahid Keshvari Expressway; Hezar Jarib Boulevard; Persian Gulf Expressway
- West end: Agharabparast Expressway; Shohadaye Soffeh Street

Location
- Country: Iran
- Major cities: Esfahan

Highway system
- Highways in Iran; Freeways

Shohadaye Soffe Expressway is an expressway in southern Isfahan, Iran. It connects Shiraz Road to Agharabparast Expressway.

From East to West
Continues as: Keshvari Expressway
| Hezar Jarib Boulevard; Dastgerdi Expressway |
| Soffeh Mountain Park |
| Shohadaye Soffeh Street |
Continues as: Agharabparast Expressway
From West to East
