= Hemmat Expressway (Isfahan) =

Hemmat Expressway
- بزرگراه شهید همت
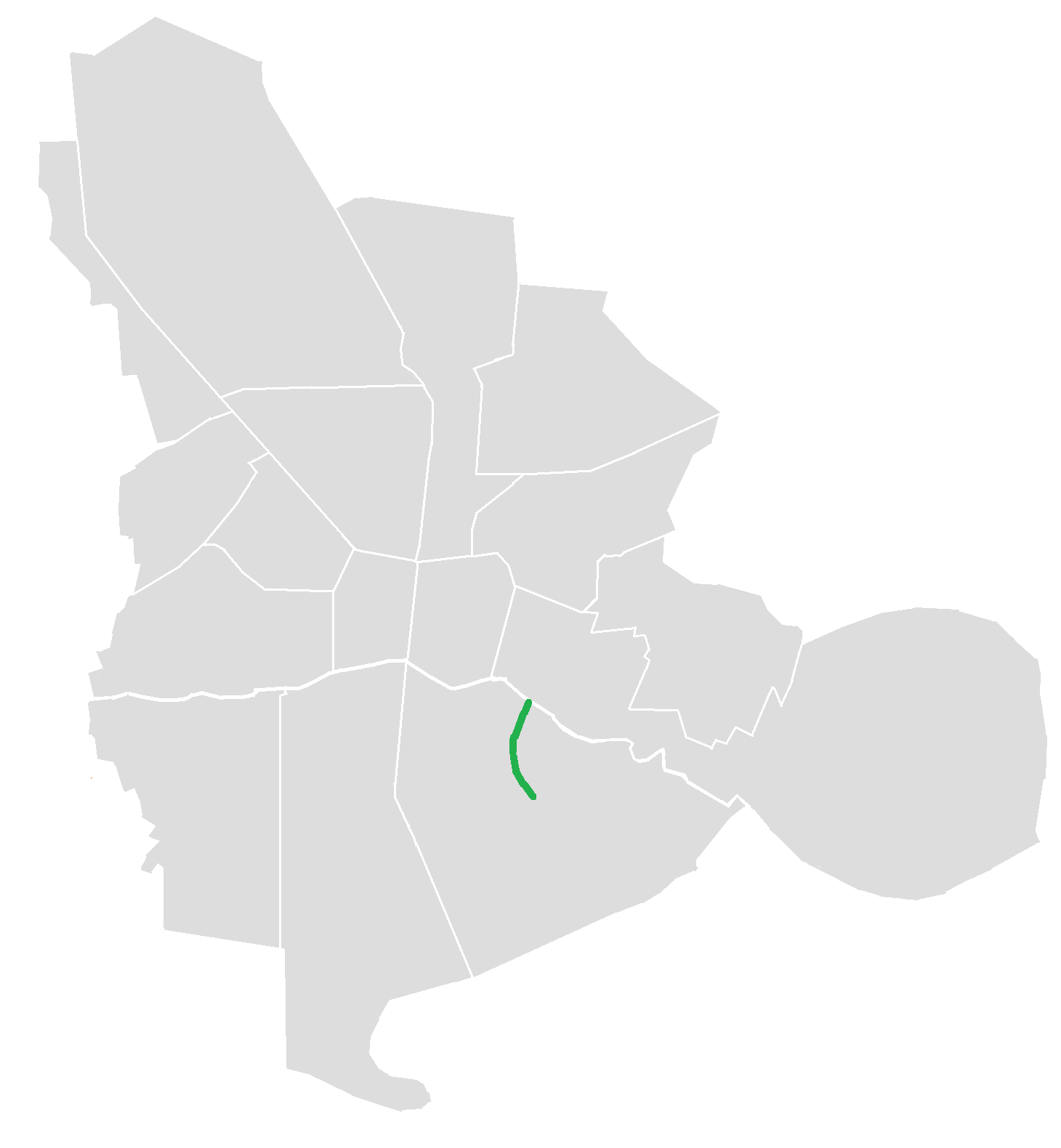

Route information
- Length: 3.0 km (1.9 mi)

Major junctions
- North end: Ghadir Bridge
- South end: Keshvari Expressway

Location
- Country: Iran
- Major cities: Isfahan

Highway system
- Highways in Iran; Freeways

Hemmat Expressway (Persian: بزرگراه شهید همت) is an expressway in southeastern Isfahan, Iran.

From North to South
Continues as: Sayyad Shirazi Expressway
Ghadir Bridge
Abshar Boulevard; Avini Boulevard
Lavi Boulevard
Tunnel
Keshvari Expressway
