= Keshvari =

Keshvari (Persian: کشوری) is a surname. Notable people with the surname include:

- Ahmad Keshvari (1953–1980), Iranian helicopter pilot
- Mazyar Keshvari (born 1981), Iranian-Norwegian politician
- Mostafa Keshvari, Canadian filmmaker
- Nematullah Kishvari, 15th- and 16th-century Azerbaijani poet

== See also ==
- Keshvari Expressway, in Isfahan
- Keshvari Rural District, Ilam Province of Iran
