= AH88 =

Road in Iran

Asian Highway 88
- Map of AH88 in red

Route information
- Length: 1,700 km (1,100 mi)

Major junctions
- West end: Bandar-e Emam Khomeini, Iran
- East end: Chabahar, Iran

Location
- Countries: Iran

Highway system
- Asian Highway Network
← AH87	→ AH111

Asian Highway 88 (AH88) is a road in the Asian Highway Network running 1700 km (1100 miles) from Bandar Imam Khomeini to Chabahar in Iran.

== Associated routes ==
=== Iran ===
- Road 96: Bandar-e Emam Khomeini - Bushehr - Shahid Rajaee Port
- Freeway 7: Shahid Rajaee Port - Bandar Abbas
- Road 94: Bandar Abbas - Minab
- Road 91: Minab - Jask
- Road 98: Jask - Chabahar

== Junctions ==
- AH8 in Bandar-e Emam Khomeini
- AH72 in Bushehr
- AH70 in Bandar Abbas
- AH75 in Chabahar
