= Road 67 (Iran) =

Road in Iran

Road 67
- جاده 67

Route information
- Length: 807 km (501 mi)

Major junctions
- From: Yasuj, Kohgiluye and Boyer-Ahmad; Road 55
- Freeway 7 Shiraz Ringway; Road 86; Road 65 Road 65-67; Road 674; Road 94
- To: Bandar Lengeh, Hormozgan; Road 96

Location
- Country: Iran
- Provinces: Kohgiluye and Boyer-Ahmad, Fars, Hormozgan
- Major cities: Sepidan, Fars; Shiraz, Fars; Jahrom, Fars; Lar, Fars province Bastak, Hormozgan

Highway system
- Highways in Iran; Freeways

Road 67 is a road in southern Iran. It connects Yasuj to Shiraz then Jahrom, Lar and Hormozgan province. The Shiraz-Yasuj part is crowded in summer and winter because in summer people go to Sepidan to use the cool weather in there and in winter to ski.
