= SR-71 (disambiguation) =

The SR-71 is a reconnaissance aircraft built by Lockheed.

SR-71 may also refer to:

- SR-71 (band), an American alternative rock band
- List of highways numbered 71
