= Road 96 (Iran) =

Road in Iran

Road 96
- جاده 96

Route information
- Part of AH88
- Length: 1,150 km (710 mi)

Major junctions
- From: Shalamche, Khuzestan; Iran
- Road 37; Road 41; Road 39; Freeway 5 Road 43; Road 45; Road 55; Road 94; Road 65; Road 67
- To: Bandarabbas, Hormozgan; Road 71

Location
- Country: Iran
- Provinces: Khuzestan, Bushehr, Hormozgan
- Major cities: Khorramshahr, Khuzestan; Abadan, Khuzestan; Bandar Mahshahr, Khuzestan; Genaveh, Bushehr; Asaluyeh, Bushehr; Bandar Lengeh, Hormozgan

Highway system
- Highways in Iran; Freeways

Road 96 is a coastal road in southern Iran connecting Abadan to Bandarabbas.
