= Road 58 (Iran) =

Road in Iran

Road 58
- جاده 58

Route information
- Length: 220 km (140 mi)

Major junctions
- From: Kashan, Isfahan; Road 71
- Freeway 7 Road 65; Road 47
- To: Aligoodarz, Lorestan; Road 62

Location
- Country: Iran
- Provinces: Isfahan, Markazi, Lorestan
- Major cities: Delijan, Markazi; Mahallat, Markazi; Khomein, Markazi

Highway system
- Highways in Iran; Freeways

Road 58 is a road in central Iran. It connects Kashan to Delijan and Aligoodarz.
