= SR72 =

SR72 may refer to:

- Lockheed Martin SR-72, a proposed hypersonic airplane under development by Lockheed Martin
- State Route 72, several highways numbered 72 in the US
