= List of highways numbered 71 =

The following highways are numbered 71:

== International ==
- AH71 Asian Highway 71
- E71 European route E71

== Afghanistan ==
- Delaram-Zaranj Highway (A71)

== Australia ==
- Anzac Avenue (Queensland)
- Mitchell Highway

== Canada ==
- Newfoundland and Labrador Route 71
- Highway 71 (Ontario)

== Greece ==
- A71 motorway (Lefktro–Sparti)
- EO71 road

== India ==
- National Highway 71 (India)

== Ireland ==
- N71 road (Ireland)

== Iran ==
- Road 71

== Israel ==
- Highway 71 (Israel)

== Korea, South ==
- National Route 71

== New Zealand ==
- State Highway 71 (New Zealand)

== United Kingdom ==
- A71 road (Scotland)

== United States ==
- Interstate 71
- U.S. Route 71
- Alabama State Route 71
  - County Route 71 (Lee County, Alabama)
- Arizona State Route 71
- California State Route 71
- Colorado State Highway 71
- Connecticut Route 71
  - Connecticut Route 71A
- Delaware Route 71
- Florida State Road 71
  - County Road 71A (Gulf County, Florida)
- Georgia State Route 71
- Idaho State Highway 71
- Illinois Route 71
- Indiana State Road 71
- K-71 (Kansas highway)
- Kentucky Route 71 (former)
- Louisiana State Route 71 (former)
- Maryland Route 71 (1927–1956) (former)
  - Maryland Route 71 (1956–1959) (former)
- Massachusetts Route 71
- M-71 (Michigan highway)
- County Road 71 (Dakota County, Minnesota)
  - County Road 71 (Ramsey County, Minnesota)
- Missouri Route 71 (1922) (former)
- Nebraska Highway 71
  - Nebraska Spur 71A
  - Nebraska Spur 71B
  - Nebraska Spur 71C
  - Nebraska Spur 71F
  - Nebraska Recreation Road 71G
- Nevada State Route 71 (former)
- New Jersey Route 71
  - County Route 71 (Bergen County, New Jersey)
  - County Route 71 (Ocean County, New Jersey)
- New York State Route 71
  - County Route 71 (Chautauqua County, New York)
  - County Route 71 (Dutchess County, New York)
  - County Route 71 (Essex County, New York)
  - County Route 71 (Herkimer County, New York)
  - County Route 71 (Livingston County, New York)
  - County Route 71 (Montgomery County, New York)
  - County Route 71 (Oneida County, New York)
  - County Route 71 (Putnam County, New York)
  - County Route 71 (Rockland County, New York)
  - County Route 71 (Saratoga County, New York)
  - County Route 71 (Schenectady County, New York)
  - County Route 71 (Suffolk County, New York)
  - County Route 71 (Sullivan County, New York)
  - County Route 71 (Warren County, New York)
  - County Route 71 (Westchester County, New York)
- North Carolina Highway 71
- Ohio State Route 71 (1923) (former)
- Oklahoma State Highway 71
- Pennsylvania Route 71 (former)
- South Carolina Highway 71
- South Dakota Highway 71
- Tennessee State Route 71
- Texas State Highway 71
  - Texas State Highway Loop 71
  - Farm to Market Road 71
  - Texas Park Road 71
- Utah State Route 71
- Virginia State Route 71
- West Virginia Route 71
- Wisconsin Highway 71
- Wyoming Highway 71

== See also ==
- A71 (disambiguation)

Preceded by 70	Lists of highways 71	Succeeded by 72
