= Road 53 (Iran) =

Road in Iran

Road 53
- جاده 53

Route information
- Length: 62 km (39 mi)

Major junctions
- From: Shahrekord, Chahar Mahal and Bakhtiari; Road 51
- To: Borujen, Chahar Mahal and Bakhtiari; Road 55

Location
- Country: Iran
- Provinces: Chahar Mahal and Bakhtiari

Highway system
- Highways in Iran; Freeways

Road 53 is a road in central Iran connecting Shahrekord to Borujen.
