= Sayyad Shirazi Expressway =

Expressway in Isfahan, Iran

Sayyad Shirazi Expressway
- بزرگراه صیاد شیرازی
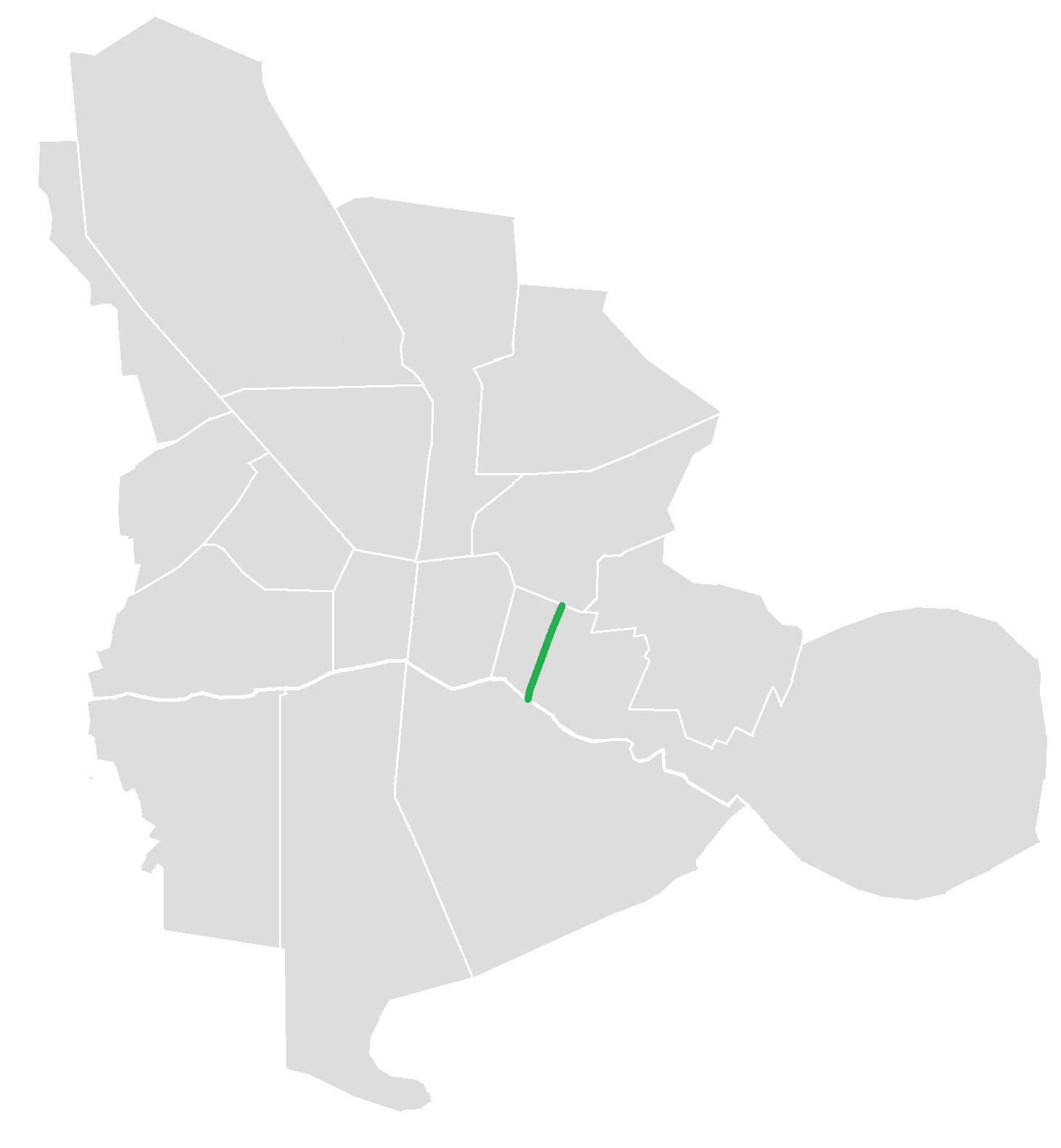

Route information
- Length: 3.0 km (1.9 mi)

Major junctions
- North end: Aghababaei Expressway; Jey Boulevard; Khajeh Amid Street
- South end: Ghadir Bridge

Location
- Country: Iran
- Major cities: Isfahan

Highway system
- Highways in Iran; Freeways

Sayyad Shirazi Expressway (Persian: بزرگراه شهید صیاد شیرازی) is an expressway in eastern Isfahan, Iran.

It is named after the assassinated Ali Sayad Shirazi, chief-of-staff of the Iranian Armed Forces during the eight-year Iran–Iraq war.

From North to South
Continues as: Aghababaei Expressway
29A / 29B	Jey Boulevard; Khajeh Amid Street
30	Hasht Behesht Street
	Allameh Amini Street; 22 Bahman Street
	Salman Farsi Boulevard
Ghadir Bridge
Continues as: Hemmat Expressway
