= Road 71 (Iran) =

Road in Iran

Road 71
- جاده 71

Route information
- Part of AH2 AH70
- Length: 1,244 km (773 mi)

Major junctions
- From: Tehran, Tehran; Azadegan Expressway
- Shahre Rey Ringway; Northern Behesht-e Zahra Expressway; Freeway 7 Road 56; Road 58; Road 62; Road 68; Road 78; Road 84; Road 86; Road 88; Road 92; Road 94; Road 96
- To: Bandarabbas, Hormozgan; Road 94

Location
- Country: Iran
- Provinces: Tehran, Qom, Isfahan, Yazd, Kerman, Hormozgan
- Major cities: Qom, Qom; Kashan, Isfahan; Yazd, Yazd; Sirjan, Kerman

Highway system
- Highways in Iran; Freeways

Road 71 connects Tehran to the Persian Gulf.

It traverses Isfahan Province, Hormozgan Province, Kermān Province, Qom Province, Tehran and Tehran Province, and Yazd Province.
