= List of ports in Iran =

There are eight ports in the south of Iran and three in the north. The following is the list of ports in Iran.

== North ==
- Caspian Port — Gilan province
- Amirabad Port — Mazandaran province, largest port on the coast of the Caspian Sea

== South ==
- Port of Shahid Rajaee — Hormozgan Province
- Chabahar Port — Sistan and Baluchestan Province
- Parsian Port — Hormozgan Province

== Dry ports ==
- Isfahan Dry Port
