= Azadegan Expressway =

Expressway in Tehran, Iran

Azadegan Expressway
- بزرگراه آزادگان
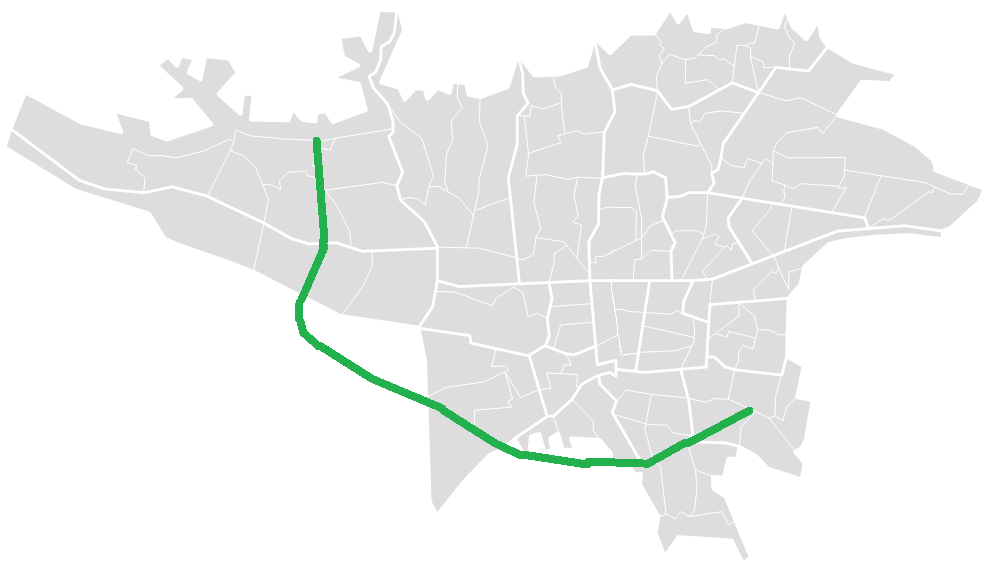

Route information
- Length: 36.4 km (22.6 mi)

Major junctions
- East end: Basij Interchange; Basij Expressway; Imam Reza Expressway; Khavaran Street
- West end: Hemmat Expressway; 43px Tehran-Shomal Freeway

Location
- Country: Iran
- Major cities: Tehran

Highway system
- Highways in Iran; Freeways

Azadegan Expressway or Tehran Ringway is an expressway in southern Tehran. It connects Tehran-Mashhad Highway to Tehran-Karaj-Tabriz Freeway and Tehran-Shomal Freeway.

From East to West
	Basij Expressway; Imam Reza Expressway; Khavaran Street
	Besat Expressway
U-Turn
	Rajabnia Street; Borujerdi Street; Fadayian Eslam Street
	Shahid Dastvare Boulevard
	Tehran-Qom Highway
Shahid Sanikhani Interchange	Tondguyan Expressway; Behesht-e Zahra Expressway
Jahad Square	Tehran-Qom Freeway; Kazemi Expressway
	Saveh Road; Saidi Expressway
U-Turn
	Tehran-Saveh Freeway
U-Turn
	Ahmadabad-e Mostowfi Expressway; Towards Ahmadabad-e Mostowfi-Eslamshahr
	Fath Expressway
	Abidi Blvd. Beheshti Blvd. Tehransar
	Karaj Special Road
	Tehran-Karaj Freeway
	Allameh Jafari Expressway
	Sadra Blvd. Havaniruz St. Shahrak-e Cheshmeh-Shahrak-e Rahahan
	Hemmat Expressway; Tehran-Shomal Freeway
From West to East
