= Kuzegari Square =

Square in Shiraz, Iran

Kuzegari Square is a square in southern Shiraz, Iran where Rahmat Highway and Basij Boulevard meet. It goes to Ghadir Interchange from the east.

== Transportation ==
=== Streets ===
- Rahmat Highway
- Basij Boulevard

=== Buses ===
- Route 3
- Route 25
- Route 31
- Route 98
- Route 135
