= Road 43 (Iran) =

Road in Iran

Road 43
- جاده 43

Route information
- Length: 78 km (48 mi)

Major junctions
- From: Mahshahr, Khuzestan; Mahshahr-Omidiyeh Road
- To: Ramhormoz, Khuzestan; Road 45

Location
- Country: Iran
- Provinces: Khuzestan
- Major cities: Ramshir, Khuzestan Province

Highway system
- Highways in Iran; Freeways

Road 43 is a road in Khuzestan Province, of western coastal Iran.

It connects Mahshahr to the Shiraz-Ahvaz main Road and to Ramhormoz.
