= Road 63 (Iran) =

Road in Iran

Road 63
- جاده 63

Route information
- Length: 128 km (80 mi)

Major junctions
- From: Shahreza, Isfahan; Road 65
- To: Chahar Mahal and Bakhtiari; Road 55

Location
- Country: Iran
- Provinces: Isfahan, Kohgiluyeh and Boyer-Ahmad, Chahar Mahal and Bakhtiari
- Major cities: Semirom, Isfahan

Highway system
- Highways in Iran; Freeways

Road 63 is a road in central Iran that connects Shahreza to Yasuj. From Shahreza to Semirom is Expressway.
