= Keshvari Expressway =

Expressway in Isfahan, Iran

Keshvari Expressway
- بزرگراه شهید کشوری
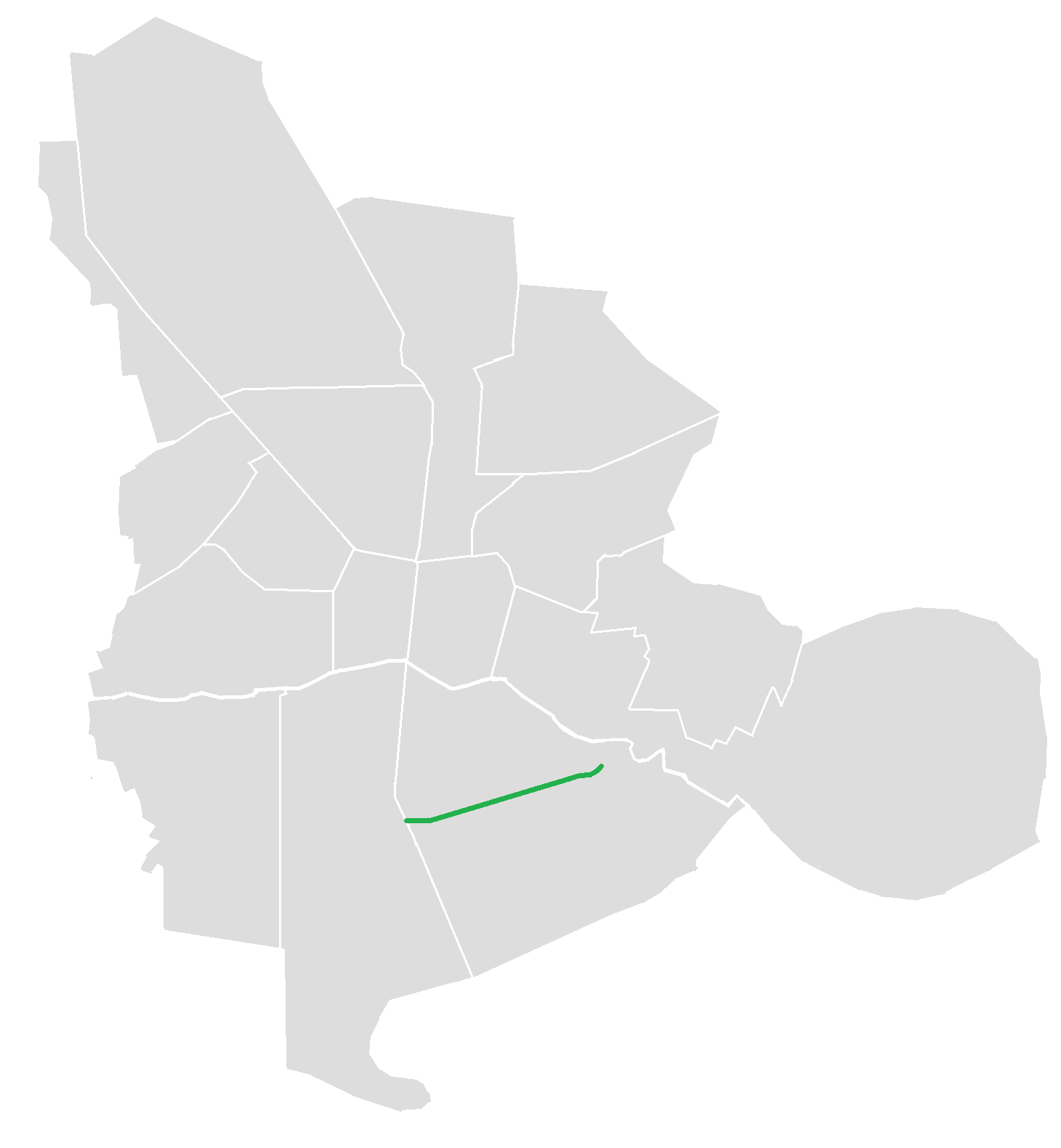

Route information
- Length: 6.4 km (4.0 mi)

Major junctions
- East end: Avini Boulevard
- West end: Shohadaye Soffeh Expressway; Hezar Jarib Boulevard; Persian Gulf Expressway

Location
- Country: Iran
- Major cities: Esfahan

Highway system
- Highways in Iran; Freeways

Keshvari Expressway is an expressway in Esfahan, Iran. This expressway connects southern entrance of the city to Avini Street.

From East to West
Avini Boulevard
Hemmat Expressway
Hezar Jarib Boulevard; Dastgerdi Expressway
Continues as: Shohadaye Soffeh Expressway
From West to East
