= Northern Behesht-e Zahra Expressway =

Road in Iran

Northern Behesht-e Zahra Expressway
- بزرگراه شمالی بهشت زهرا

Route information
- Length: 3.5 km (2.2 mi)

Major junctions
- East end: Tehran-Qom Highway
- West end: Tehran-Qom Freeway

Location
- Country: Iran
- Major cities: Tehran

Highway system
- Highways in Iran; Freeways

Northern Behesht-e-Zahra Highway (Persian: بزرگراه شمالی بهشت زهرا) is an expressway in northern part of Behesht-e Zahra Cemetery connecting Tehran-Qom Highway to Freeway.

From East to West
Tehran-Qom Highway
Shohada Metro Station
Behesht-e Zahra Expressway; Shohada Boulevard
U-Turn
Tehran-Qom Freeway
From West to East
