= Road 86 (Iran) =

Road in Iran

Road 86
- جاده 86

Route information
- Part of AH72
- Length: 1,203 km (748 mi) The western 47 km (29 mi) is in common with Road 72

Major junctions
- From: Bagheyn, Kerman; Road 84
- Freeway 5 Road 72; Road 43; Road 45; Road 55; Road 554; Road 65; Road 67 Road 65-67; Road 92; Road 164; Road 864; Road 71; Road 88
- To: Ahvaz County, Khoozestan; Road 72

Location
- Country: Iran
- Provinces: Kerman, Fars, Kohgiluyeh and Boyer-Ahmad, Khoozestan
- Major cities: Shiraz, Fars; Gachsaran, Kohgiluyeh and Boyer-Ahmad; Behbahan, Khoozestan

Highway system
- Highways in Iran; Freeways

Road 86 is a route connecting south-west to southeast from Kerman to Ahvaz.
