= Road 88 (Iran) =

Road in Iran

Road 88
- جاده 88

Route information
- Length: 280 km (170 mi)

Major junctions
- From: Sirjan, Kerman; Road 86
- To: Jiroft, Kerman; Road 91

Location
- Country: Iran
- Provinces: Kerman
- Major cities: Baft, Kerman

Highway system
- Highways in Iran; Freeways

Road 88 is a road located completely in Kerman Province connecting Sirjan to Baft and Jiroft.
