= Road 78 (Iran) =

Road in Iran

Road 78
- جاده 78

Route information
- Length: 647 km (402 mi)

Major junctions
- From: Yasuj, Kohgiluyeh and Boyer-Ahmad; Road 55
- Road 65; Road 71
- To: Ravar, Kerman; Road 91

Location
- Country: Iran
- Provinces: Kohgiluyeh and Boyer-Ahmad, Fars, Yazd, Kerman
- Major cities: Eqlid, Fars; Abarkuh, Yazd; Yazd, Yazd eslamiyeh Yazd

Highway system
- Highways in Iran; Freeways

Road 78 is a second class road in Iran connecting Yasuj to Yazd via Road 65 southern Abadeh.
