= Zobahan Freeway =

Road in Iran

Freeway 51
- 51 آزادراه
- Zobahan Freeway آزادراه ذوب آهن

Route information
- Length: 28 km (17 mi)

Major junctions
- From: Isfahan, Isfahan; Agharabparast Expressway; Kazemi Boulevard
- Najafabad-Fuladshahr Expressway; Isfahan West Ring Road; Freeway 7
- To: Zarrinshahr, Isfahan; Road 51

Location
- Country: Iran
- Provinces: Isfahan
- Major cities: Falavarjan, Isfahan; Kelishad va Sudarjan, Isfahan; Imanshahr, Isfahan; Fuladshahr, Isfahan

Highway system
- Highways in Iran; Freeways

Zobahan Freeway (Persian: آزادراه ذوب آهن) is a freeway in Greater Isfahan Region, Isfahan Province, Central Iran, connecting Isfahan to its southwestern suburbs and Esfahan Steel Company (known as Zobahan in Persian) where the freeway gets its name from.

== Route ==
From West to East
Aqarabparast Expressway; Keshavarz Boulevard; Abbaspur Boulevard; West to Dorcheh
Abrisham
Kelishad va Sudarjan; Falavarjan
Garmaseh; Falavarjan
Imanshahr
Najafabad-Fuladshahr Expressway; Imanshahr; Fuladshahr
Fuladshahr
Freeway 7
Esfahan Steel Company (Zobahan); Road 51; South to Zarrinshahr-Shahrekord
From East to West
