= Baharestan, Isfahan =

City in Isfahan province, Iran

Baharestan Persian: بهارستان
- City
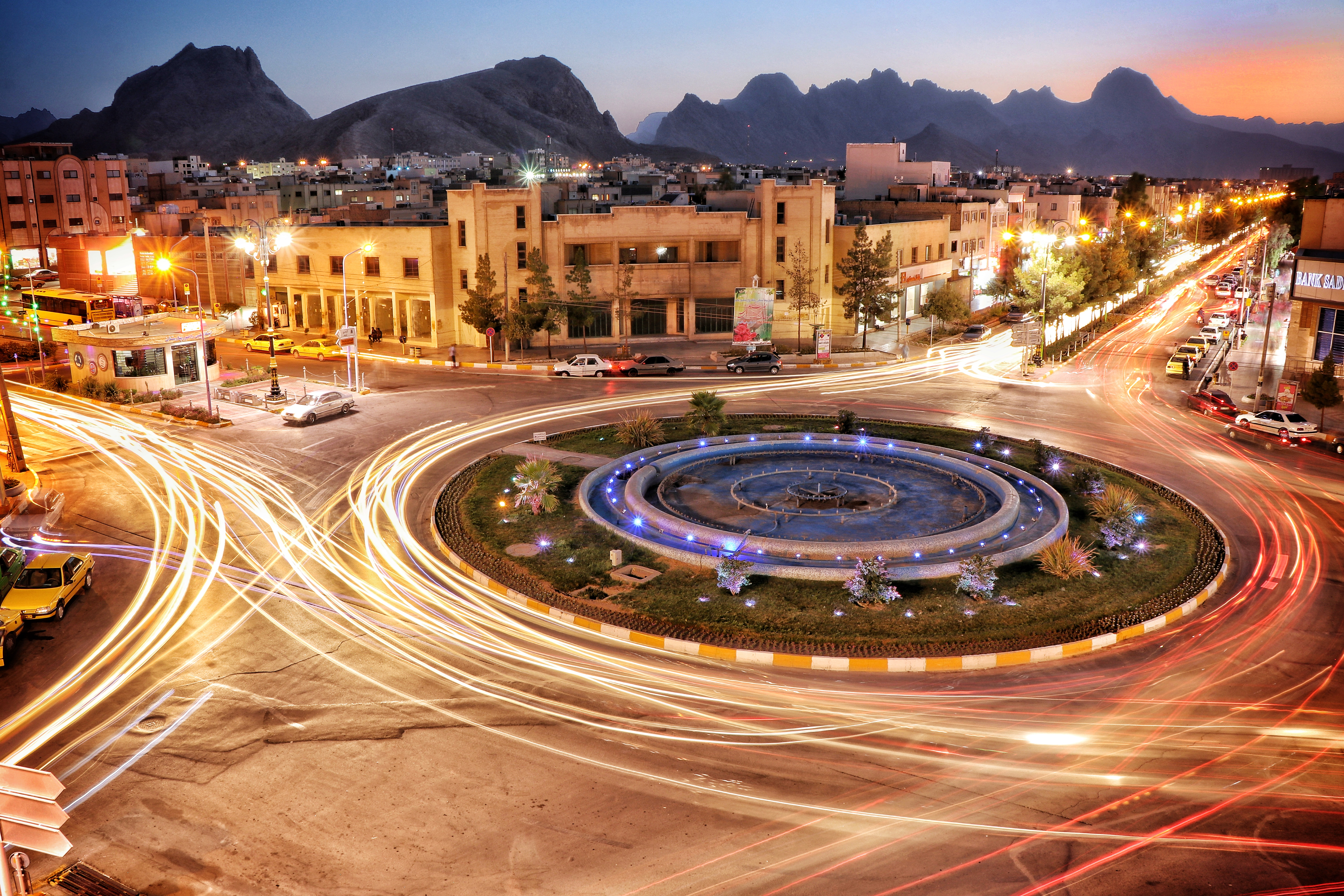
- Baharestan New Town

- Location within Iran
- Coordinates: 32°29′12″N 51°46′51″E
- Country: Iran
- Province: Isfahan
- County: Isfahan
- District: Central
- Elevation: 1,550 to 1,600 m (5,090 to 5,250 ft)

Population (2016)
  - Total: 79,023
- Time zone: UTC+3:30 (IRST)
- Website: www.ibaharestan.ir

Baharestan (Persian: بهارستان) (Note: Also romanized as Bahārestān; also known as Bahristān) is a city in the Central District of Isfahan County, Isfahan province, Iran. It is a new planned city 20 km southeast of Isfahan and north of the Lashtar Mountains along Isfahan-Shiraz Road.

== Demographics ==
=== Population ===
At the time of the 2006 National Census, the city's population was 45,538 in 12,769 households. The following census in 2011 counted 61,647 people in 18,703 households. The 2016 census measured the population of the city as 79,023 people in 25,118 households.
