= Road 41 (Iran) =

Road in Iran

Road 41
- جاده 41

Route information
- Length: 123 km (76 mi)

Major junctions
- From: Khorramshahr, Khuzestan; Road 96
- To: Ahvaz, Khuzestan

Location
- Country: Iran
- Provinces: Khuzestan

Highway system
- Highways in Iran; Freeways

Road 41 is a road in Khuzestan Province of coastal southwestern Iran.

== Route ==
It connects Khorramshahr to Ahvaz, along the Karun River in the Zagros Mountains.

== See also ==
- Road 37 (Iran) — another road in region.
- Transportation in Khuzestan Province
- Zagros Mountains topics
