= Ghadir Bridge =

Ghadir Bridge Persian: پل غدیر
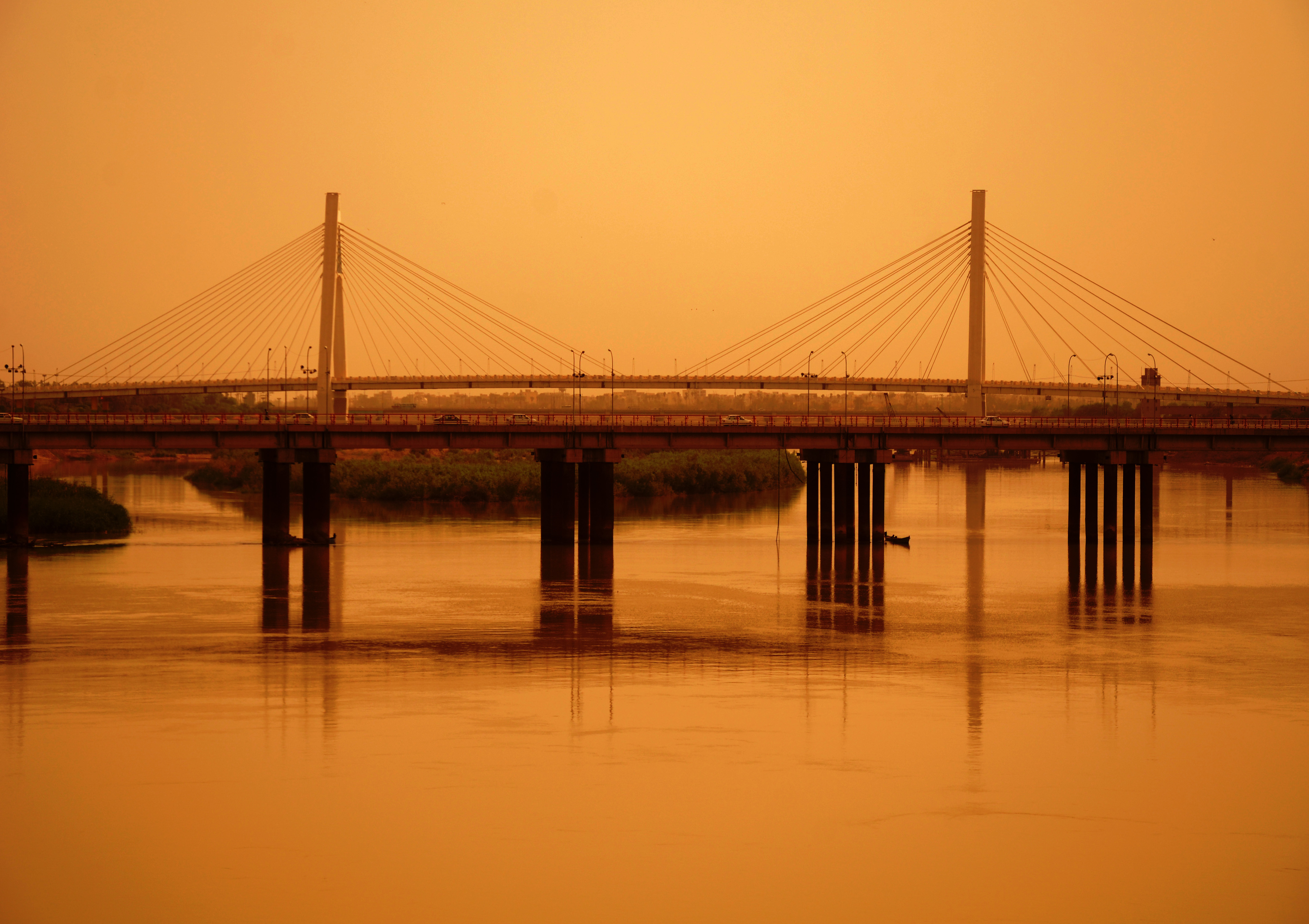
- Coordinates: 32°38′02″N 51°42′17″E
- Crosses: Zayanderud
- Locale: Isfahan, Iran

History
- Construction end: 2000

Location
- Interactive map of Ghadir Bridge

Ghadir Bridge (Persian: پل غدیر) is a bridge over the Zayanderud in Districts 4 and 6 of Isfahan. The bridge was completed in 2000.

== Transportation ==
- Sayyad Shirazi Expressway
- Hemmat Expressway

== See also ==
- Bridges over the Zayandeh River
