= Freeway 24 (Iran) =

Freeway 24
- 24 آزادراه
- Maragheh Hashtrud Freeway
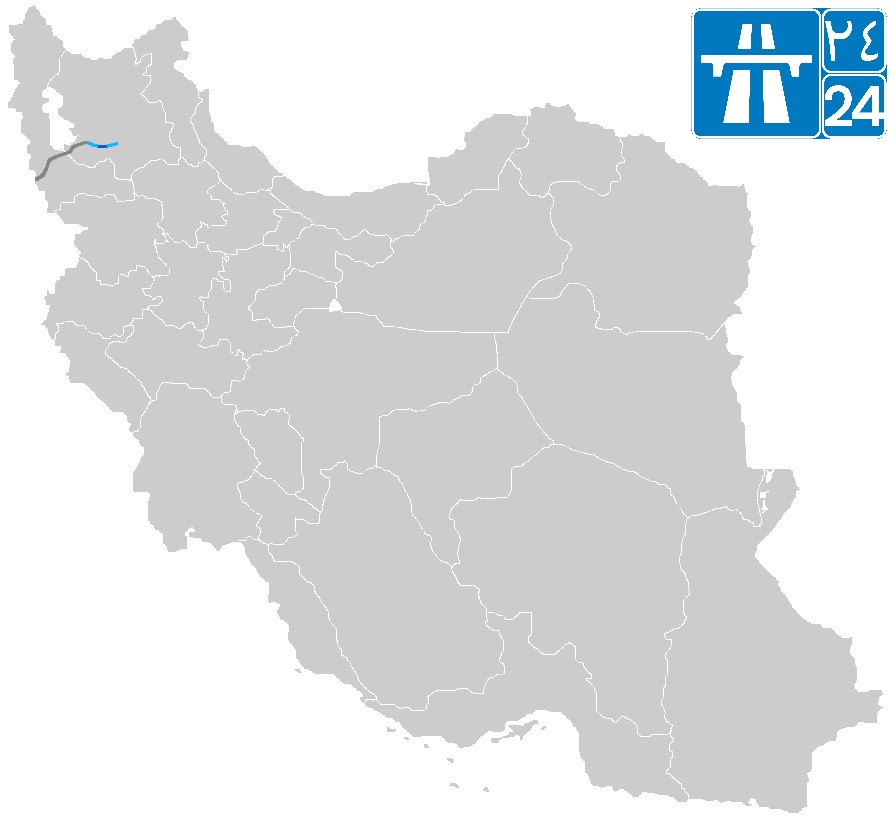

Route information
- Length: 29 km (18 mi)

Major junctions
- From: Nazarkahrizi, East Azarbaijan; Maragheh-Hashtrud Old Road
- To: Goli Kand, East Azarbaijan; Maragheh-Hashtrud Old Road

Location
- Country: Iran
- Provinces: East Azerbaijan Province

Highway system
- Highways in Iran; Freeways

Freeway 24 (Persian: آزادراه ۲۴) is a partially constructed freeway project in northwest Iran. It starts in East Azerbaijan Province and ends in West Azerbaijan Province, connecting the cities of Hashtrud, Maragheh, Bonab, Malekan, Ajabshir, Miandoab, Saqqez, Baneh and Naqadeh to the freeway network. The goal of this freeway is to create a freeway network from Iraqi Kurdistan through the Tamarchin border to Tehran. The project will consist of several sections, the most important of which is the Hashtrod-Maragheh Freeway.

== Maragheh-Hashtrud Freeway ==
The first section of this freeway to be constructed is the 110-kilometer Maragheh-Hashtroud route, which consists of five sections. Its construction began in 2016, and sections 2 and 3 were put into operation on 11 March 2024, in the presence of the minister of roads and urban development of the 14th government. This freeway begins in Hashtrod city, crosses and intersects with the Zanjan-Tabriz Freeway and has several intersections with the old Maragheh-Hashtroud road, before finally joining Road 21. Section 4 of this freeway is scheduled to be opened in March 2025.

== Route ==
From West to East
Tamrchin Customs
Under Construction
Goli Kand; Road 24; Towards Maragheh-Hashtrud
Nazarkahrizi; Road 24; Towards Maragheh-Hashtrud
Under Construction
From East to West
