= Road 45 (Iran) =

Road in Iran

Road 45
- جاده 45

Route information
- Length: 194 km (121 mi)

Major junctions
- From: Ramhormoz, Khuzestan; Road 72
- Road 86
- To: Bandar Deylam, Bushehr; Road 96

Location
- Country: Iran
- Provinces: Bushehr, Khuzestan
- Major cities: Behbahan, Khuzestan Province

Highway system
- Highways in Iran; Freeways

Road 45 is a road in Bushehr Province and Khuzestan Province of coastal southwestern Iran.

It connects Bandar Deylam and the Persian Gulf Coastal Road to Ramhormoz and the Ahvaz-Esfahan Road via Behbahan.
