= Rahmat Highway =

Road in Shiraz, Iran

- بزرگراه رحمت

Route information
- Length: 12 km (7.5 mi)

Location
- Country: Iran
- Major cities: Shiraz, Iran

Highway system
- Highways in Iran; Freeways

Rahmat Highway is a road in southern Shiraz, Iran. Built in 1998, it is a highway road that runs from Motahari Boulevard east to Modarres Boulevard, where it becomes Sardaran Boulevard.
