= List of highways numbered 72A =

The following highways are numbered 72A:

== India ==
- National Highway 72A (India)

== United States ==
- County Road 72A (Sarasota County, Florida)
- New York State Route 72A (former)

== See also ==
- List of highways numbered 72
