= Road 94 (Iran) =

Road in Iran

Road 94
- جاده 94

Route information
- Part of AH88
- Length: 905 km (562 mi)

Major junctions
- From: Ahram, Bushehr; Road 96
- Road 96; Road 65; Road 67; Road 71
- To: Near Minab, Hormozgan province Road 91

Location
- Country: Iran
- Provinces: Bushehr, Fars, Hormozgan
- Major cities: Ahram, Bushehr; Farashband, Fars; Firouzabad, Fars; Khonj, Fars; Lar, Fars

Highway system
- Highways in Iran; Freeways

Road 94 is a road in southern Iran connecting Bushehr Province to Firouzabad, Lar and Bandarabbas.
