= A71 =

A71 or A-71 may refer to:

== Roads ==
- A71 road in Afghanistan
- A71 motorway (France)
- A71 motorway (Greece)
- A71 road (Scotland)
- Bundesautobahn 71, a German motorway also called A 71
- Mitchell Highway, a road in Queensland, Australia

== Other uses ==
- Benoni Defense, in the Encyclopaedia of Chess Openings
- Samsung Galaxy A71, smartphone released in 2019
- "A71", a song by New Jersey band Lorna Shore
