= Kalatu, Bandar Abbas =

Kalatu كلاتو
- village
- Location within Iran
- Coordinates: 27°12′02″N 56°11′36″E
- Country: Iran
- Province: Hormozgan
- County: Bandar Abbas
- Bakhsh: Central
- Rural District: Tazian

Population (2016)
  - Total: 328
- Time zone: UTC+3:30 (IRST)
  - Summer (DST): IRDT

Kalatu (Persian: كلاتو, also Romanized as Kalātū) is a village in Tazian Rural District, in the Central District of Bandar Abbas County, Hormozgan Province, Iran. At the 2016 census, its population was 328, in 40 families.
