= Road 62 (Iran) =

Road in Iran

Road 62
- جاده 62
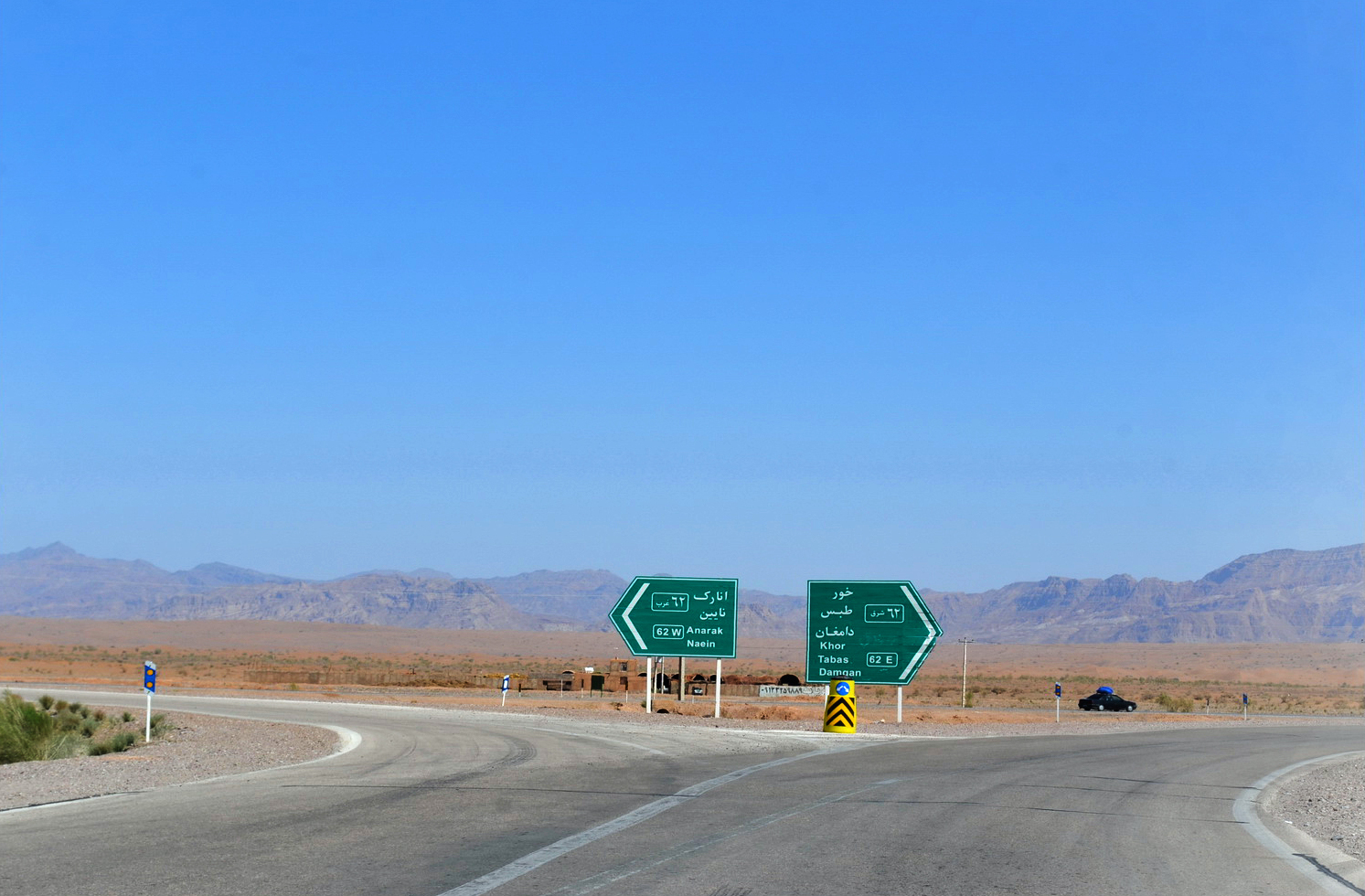

Route information
- Length: 655 km (407 mi)

Major junctions
- From: 45km southern Jandaq, Isfahan; Road 81
- Freeway 7 Road 65; Road 58
- To: Near Chalanchulan, Loristan; Road 37

Location
- Country: Iran
- Provinces: Isfahan, Loristan
- Major cities: Nian, Isfahan; Isfahan, Isfahan; Najafabad, Isfahan; Tiran, Isfahan; Daran, Isfahan; Buin va Miandasht, Isfahan; Aligudarz, Loristan; Azna, Loristan; Dorood, Loristan

Highway system
- Highways in Iran; Freeways

Road 62 is a road connecting the province of Loristan to Isfahan and Mashhad, in Iran.
