= Isfahan Dry Port =

Future inland port in Iran

- Interactive map of Isfahan Dry Port

Location
- Location: Esfahan

Details
- Owned by: شرکت بندر خشک اصفهان Isfahan Dry Port Corp
- Land area: 729 hectares (1,800 acres)

Isfahan Dry Port (Persian: بندر خشک اصفهان), also referred to as Isfahan Logistics Village, is the first national dry port of Iran under development by the private sector and Ministry of Road and Urban development administration.
