= Tall-e Siah, Hormozgan =

Tall-e Siah تل سياه
- village
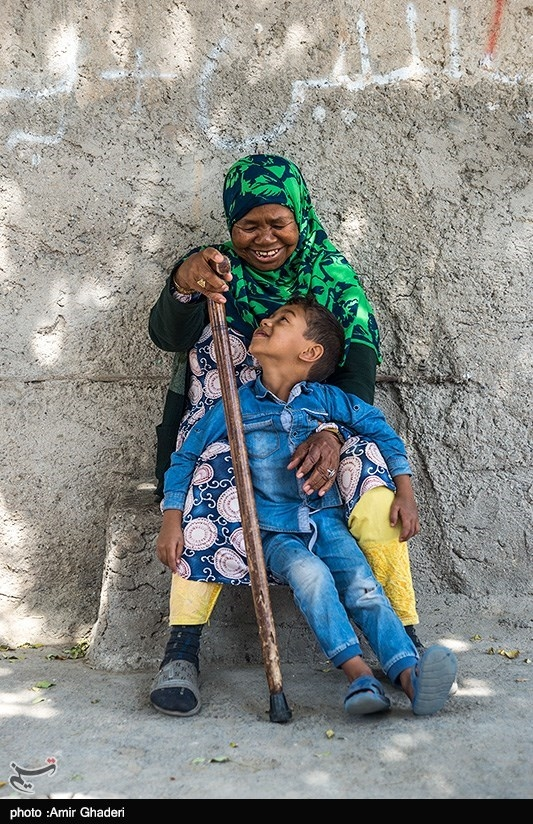
- Tall-e_Siah, Iran

- Location within Iran
- Coordinates: 27°13′42″N 56°13′15″E
- Country: Iran
- Province: Hormozgan
- County: Bandar Abbas
- Bakhsh: Central
- Rural District: Tazian

Population (2016)
  - Total: 512
- Time zone: UTC+3:30 (IRST)

Tall-e Siah (Persian: تل سياه, also Romanized as Tall-e Sīāh) is a village in Tazian Rural District, in the Central District of Bandar Abbas County, Hormozgan Province, Iran. At the 2016 census, its population was 512, in 54 families.
