= Tang-e Khiareh =

Tang-e Khiareh تنگخياره
- Village
- Location within Iran
- Coordinates: 29°55′30″N 52°26′52″E
- Country: Iran
- Province: Fars
- County: Sepidan
- Bakhsh: Beyza
- Rural District: Kushk-e Hezar

Population (2006)
  - Total: 514
- Time zone: UTC+3:30 (IRST)
  - Summer (DST): UTC+4:30 (IRDT)

Tang-e Khiareh (Persian: تنگخياره, also Romanized as Tang-e Khīāreh; also known as Khīāreh) is a village in Kushk-e Hezar Rural District, Beyza District, Sepidan County, Fars province, Iran. At the 2006 census, its population was 514, in 121 families.
