= A72 =

A72 or A-72 may refer to:

- A72 road (Great Britain), a major road in the UK
- A72 motorway (France)
- Autovía A-72, a Spanish motorway
- Benoni Defense, a chess opening
- Bundesautobahn 72, a German motorway
- ARM Cortex-A72, a computer processor microarchitecture
- Samsung Galaxy A72, a smartphone released in 2021
