= Road 51 (Iran) =

Road in Iran

Road 51
- جاده 51

Route information
- Length: 150.5 km (93.5 mi)

Major junctions
- From: Isfahan, Isfahan; Azadi Square
- Freeway 7 Road 53
- To: Near Gahro, Chahar Mahal and Bakhtiari; Road 72

Location
- Country: Iran
- Provinces: Isfahan, Chahar Mahal and Bakhtiari
- Major cities: Falavarjan, Isfahan; Zarrinshahr, Isfahan; Shahrekord, Chahar Mahal and Bakhtiari

Highway system
- Highways in Iran; Freeways

Road 51 is an important road in Iran connecting Shahrekord and Isfahan's satellite cities to Isfahan.
