= Freeway 5 (Iran) =

Road in Iran

Freeway 5
- 5 آزادراه
- Khalij Fars (Persian Gulf) Freeway

Route information
- Part of AH2 AH8
- Length: 415 km (258 mi)

Major junctions
- From: Tehran, Tehran; Azadegan Expressway
- Road 65; Freeway 2; Freeway 6; Road 48; Road 56; Road 37; Road 41
- To: Sar Bandar, Khuzestan; Road 96

Location
- Country: Iran
- Provinces: Tehran, Markazi, Qom, Lorestan, Khuzestan
- Major cities: Parand, Tehran; Saveh, Markazi; Salafchegan, Qom; Arak, Markazi; Borujerd, Lorestan; Khorramabad, Lorestan; Andimeshk, Khuzestan; Shush, Khuzestan; Ahvaz, Khuzestan

Highway system
- Highways in Iran; Freeways

Freeway 5 is a freeway in Iran connecting two cities of Tehran and Bandar Imam via Saveh, Arak, Borujerd, Khorramabad, Andimeshk and Ahvaz. This freeway is part of North-South Corridor. It starts from Azadegan Expressway and ends at Bandar Imam. It runs along Road 65, Road 56 and Road 37. The AADT of the section from Ahvaz to Bandar Imam is 15,000, of which 2,500 are Iraqi tankers.

== Completed sections ==
- Tehran–Saveh–Salafchegan – 178 kilometres (111 mi)
- Arak Northern Bypass – 45 kilometres (28 mi)
- Khorramabad–Pol-e-Zal – Andimeshk 147 kilometres (91 mi)
- Ahvaz–Bandar Imam 90 kilometres (56 mi)

== Section under construction ==
- Arak–Borujerd–Khorramabad 134 kilometres (83 mi)

== Planned sections ==
- Salafchegan–Arak
- Khorramabad Southern Bypass
- Andimeshk–Ahvaz

== Detailed characteristics ==
From North to South
Continues as: Borujerdi Expressway
Azadegan Expressway
Tehran; Municipal District 18
Tehran Toll Station
Eslamshahr–Ahmadabad-e Mostowfi Expressway; North to Ahmadabad-e Mostowfi–Tehran; South to Eslamshahr
Nasimshahr; Dehshad-e Bala Tehran Cargo Terminal
Orvin
North to Shahriar–Shahedshahr–Sababshahr; South to Golerstan
Negarestan Service Station
North to Alard–Shahriar; South to Robat Karim-Centre
Robat Karim-South; Shahrak-e Parandak
Parand; Imam Khomeini International Airport; Towards Road 65; Parand Metro Station
Parand Toll Station
Road 65; North to Robat Karim; South to Parandak, Markazi
Tehran Province; Markazi Province
Rudshur Power Plant
Road 65
Tehran Southern bypass freeway (Ghadir freeway); North to Abyek-Ghazvin-Tabriz; South to Charmshahr-Mashhad
Baran Service Station
Soltan Ahmadlu
Mamunieh
Saveh-Hamedan Freeway (Karbala Freeway); Towards Hamadan-Sanandaj-Kermanshah
Kaveh Toll Station
Kaveh Industrial Park
Road 48; Towards Saveh
Saveh Toll Station
Hoseinabad; Emamabad
Service Station
Markazi Province; Qom Province
Aftab Service Station
Dastjerd
Salafchegan Toll Station
Road 56; East to Qom; West to Arak
Continues as: Road 65; South Towards Delijan-Isfahan
Under construction
Qom Province; Markazi Province
Under construction
Road 56; East to Salafchegan–Qom–Tehran; West to Arak
Arak Airport; Arak
Road 47; North to Farmahin–Komeyjan; South to Arak
Marzijaran; Arak
Road 56; West to Arak; East to Mohajeran–Borujerd–Malayer
Under construction
Markazi Province; Lorestan Province
Under construction
Road 56; North to Arak-Tehran; South to Borujerd-Khorramabad
Deh Kord
Borujerd Toll Station
Road 37; North to Borujerd-Tehran; South to Chalanchulan-Khorramabad
Puneh Tunel
Khorramabad-North Toll Station
Road 37; North to Borujerd-Arak; South to Khorramabad-Ahvaz
Under construction
Road 37
Under construction
Road 37; North to Khorramabad; South to Pol-e Dokhtar
Khorramabad-South Toll Station
Pol-e Zal Service Station
Pol-e Zal Toll Station
Road 37; North to Pol-e Dokhtar–Khorramabad; South to Andimeshk
Lorestan Province; Khuzestan Province
Road 37; North to Pol-e Dokhtar; South to Andimeshk–Dezful–Ahvaz
Under Construction
Road 86; East to Omidiyeh–Ramhormoz; Modares Expressway; Towards Ahvaz; Ahvaz Northern Bypass Expressway; Ahvaz Southern Ring Road
Foolad-e Khuzestan Boulevard; Towards Foolad Arena Stadium
Ahvaz Toll Station
Karun Service Station
Shahrak-e Shahid Chamran
Road 96 (Mahshahr Bypass Expressway)
Road 96; East to Mahshahr–Omidiyeh–Ramshir–Bushehr; West to Bandar-e Emam Khomeyni–Abadan
From South to North

== Images ==
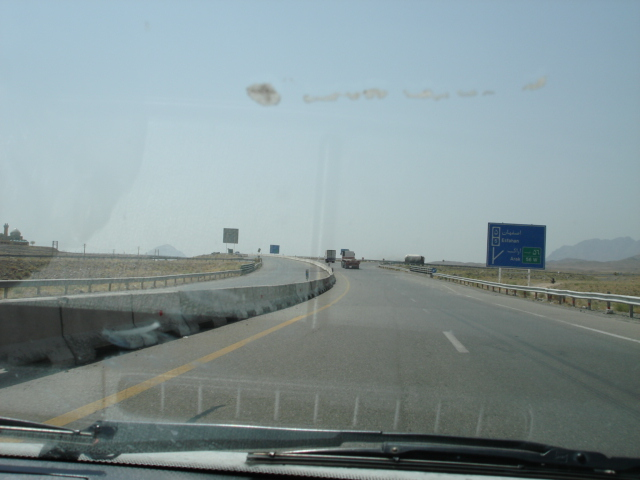
Junction with Road 56 in Salafchegan

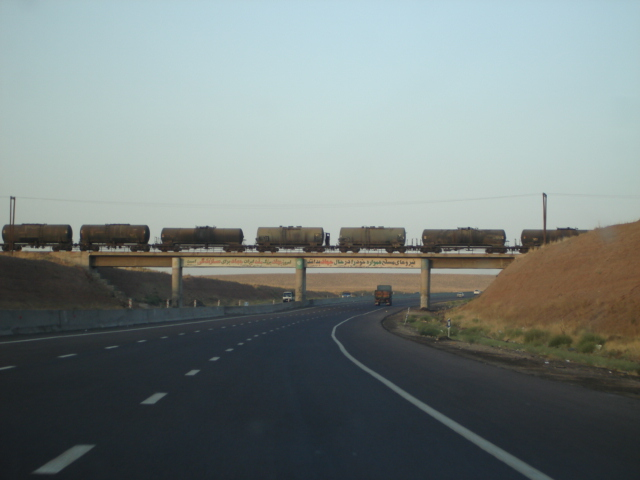

== Tehran–Pardis Freeway ==
Freeway 5
- 5 آزادراه
- Tehran-Pardis Freeway آزادراه تهران-پردیس
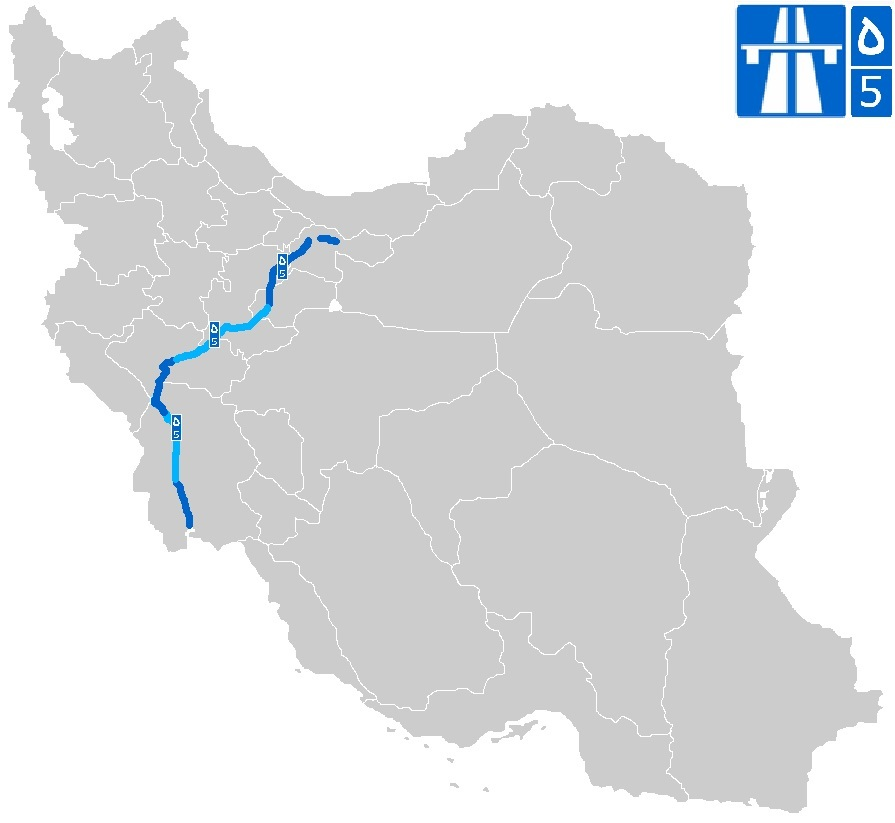

Route information
- Length: 23 km (14 mi)

Major junctions
- From: Tehran, Tehran; Babayi Expressway
- Road 77
- To: Pardis, Tehran; Bumehen Southern Bypass Freeway; Road 77

Location
- Country: Iran
- Provinces: Tehran
- Major cities: Tehran, Tehran; Pardis, Tehran

Highway system
- Highways in Iran; Freeways

== Detailed characteristics ==
From North to South
Bumehen Southern Bypass Freeway Bumehen Northern Bypass Freeway Road 77; North to Bumehen–Rudehen–Qaemshahr–Sari; South to Pardis–Jajrud–Tehran
Road 77; North to Bumehen; South to Jajrud; Khalij-e Fars Boulevard; Pardis-Centre; Estalak
Pardis
Pardis Toll Station
Road 77; North to Bumehen; South to Jajrud
Road 77; North to Jajrud; South to Tehran
Babayi Expressway
From South to North
