= Goli Kand =

Goli Kand گلي كند
- Village
- Location within Iran
- Coordinates: 37°16′20″N 46°29′07″E
- Country: Iran
- Province: East Azerbaijan
- County: Maragheh
- Bakhsh: Saraju
- Rural District: Sarajuy-ye Sharqi

Population (2006)
  - Total: 223
- Time zone: UTC+3:30 (IRST)
  - Summer (DST): UTC+4:30 (IRDT)

Goli Kand (Persian: گلي كند, also Romanized as Golī Kand; also known as Kolī Kand) is a village in Sarajuy-ye Sharqi Rural District, Saraju District, Maragheh County, East Azerbaijan Province, Iran. At the 2006 census, its population was 223, in 43 families.
