= Mo'allem Freeway =

Road in Iran

Freeway 9
- 9 آزادراه
- Mo'allem Freeway آزادراه معلم

Route information
- Part of AH72
- Length: 32 km (20 mi)

Major junctions
- From: Northern Shahin Shahr, Isfahan; Road 65
- To: Isfahan, Isfahan; Kaveh Boulevard; Taksirani Boulevard

Location
- Country: Iran
- Provinces: Isfahan

Highway system
- Highways in Iran; Freeways

Mo'allem Freeway, also numbered as Freeway 9 is a freeway in central Iran located in Isfahan Province. It is about 32 kilometres (20 mi) long and it connects Kaveh Boulevard to Road 65. The road is an alternative option for Azadegan Expressway connecting Isfahan to Shahinshahr.

== Route ==
From North to South
shahid zahedi Expressway; North to Meimeh-Delijan-Tehran; South to Shahinshahr-Esfahan
Shahinshahr-North; Hesa
Shahinshahr-South; Gorgab
Road 656; Gaz-e Borkhvar; Isfahan Refinery
Khorzuq; Towards Azadegan Expressway
Isfahan; Municipal District 12
Taksirani Boulevard
Continues as: Kaveh Boulevard
From South to North

== Future extension ==
There are plans awaiting investment to extend the freeway Northwards to replace The existing expressway to Delijan and Salafchegan.
