= Port of Shahid Rajaee =

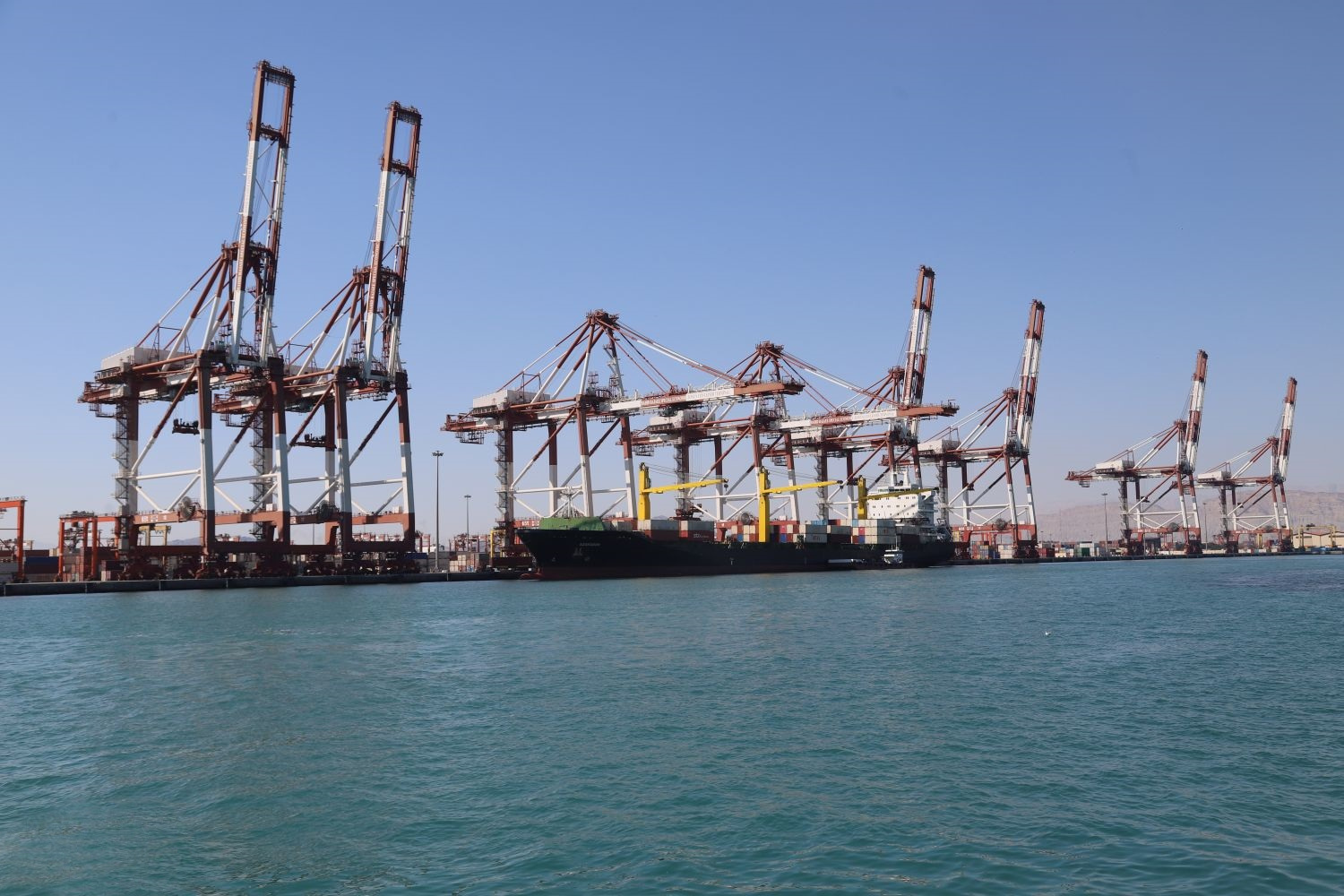
- The port in 2020
- Interactive map of Port of Shahid Rajaee
- Location in Iran

Location
- Country: Iran
- Location: Bandar Abbas
- Coordinates: 27°06′51″N 56°03′41″E
- UN/LOCODE: IRSRP

Details
- Land area: 2,400 hectares (5,900 acres)
- No. of berths: 40

Statistics
- Annual TEU: 6,000,000
- Website; Shahid Rajaee Port Complex

The Port of Shahid Rajaee (Persian: بندر شهید رجایی, romanized: Bandar Shahid Rajai, lit. 'Port of Rajai the Martyr'), or Shahid Rajaee Port, is one of the two parts in the port of Bandar Abbas, southern Hormozgan province, Iran. It is located in the north shores of the Strait of Hormuz. Shahid Rajaee port is about 14.5 kilometers (7.8 nmi) west-southwest of the Port of Bandar Abbas. It is named after Mohammad-Ali Rajai.

The area of Shahid Rajaee Port covers about 2,400 hectares (5,900 acres). The port has the capacity of handling 70 million tons of cargo annually, a figure which includes three million TEUs of containerized cargo. The Port of Shahid Rajaee consists of 23 berths having alongside depth of 15 meters (49 ft). The overall roofed warehouse covers an area of over 19 hectares (47 acres) of roofed warehouses. The port is featured with 23.5 kilometers (14.6 mi) of domestic railway tracks.

Marine travelers who enter Iran via Shahid Rajaee Port can receive a visa upon arrival. Shahid Rajaee port is a Special Economic Zone.

In 2020, Israel launched a cyberattack that hampered operations at the Shahid Rajaee port.

== Statistics ==
Shahid Rajaee Port is responsible for 85% of the total loading and unloading carried out at the Iranian ports. By 2011, Shahid Rajaee port ranked 44th among the 3500 major ports of the world. According to the director-general of Hormozgan Ports and Maritime Organization, container loading for export from the Shahid Rajaee Port from 21 March to 22 August 2021 increased by 28% in comparison with the same period of the previous year.

In late December 2020, six memorandums of understanding were signed between the Ports and Maritime Organization (PMO) and Iranian companies for investing around $2.38 billion with an additional €800 million for development projects of Shahid Rajaee Port's hinterland.

== 2025 explosion ==
On 26 April 2025, an explosion and fire occurred at the port, killing at least 70 people and injuring over 1,200 others, according to state media reports. The blast, at around 12:20 Iran Standard Time, originated from several containers in the port's wharf area, possibly containing ammonium perchlorate, a chemical used in rocket fuel. The explosion occurred amid the Iran–United States negotiations for Iran's ballistic missiles program, with the Iranian foreign minister saying that security was on high alert.

== See also ==
- List of ports in Iran
