= Borujen =

City in Chaharmahal and Bakhtiari province, Iran

Borujen Persian: بروجن
- City
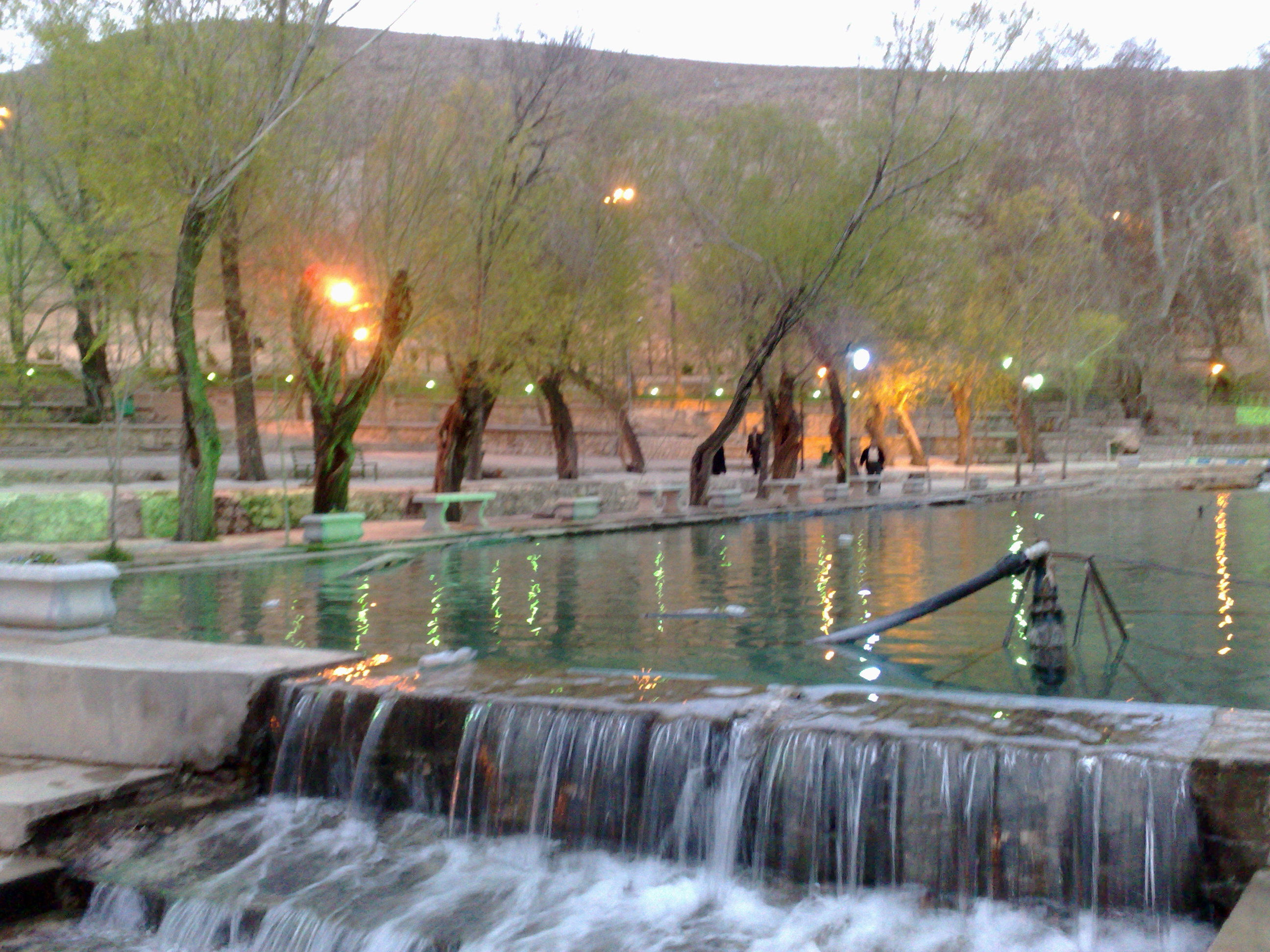
- Siasard Touristic Area at sunset in summer

- Location within Iran
- Coordinates: 31°58′19″N 51°17′30″E
- Country: Iran
- Province: Isfahan
- County: Mobarakeh
- District: Central

Government
  - Mayor: Garshasb Rigi
- Elevation: 2,197 m (7,208 ft)

Population (2016)
  - Total: 57,071
- Time zone: UTC+3:30 (IRST)
- Area code: 382

Borujen (Persian: بروجن) (Note: Also romanized as Boroojen, Borūjen, and Broojen; also known as Borojen, Oorjen, and Urjen) is a city in the Isfahan province, Iran.

== Demographics ==
=== Language and ethnicity ===
The city is populated by Persians.

=== Population ===
At the time of the 2006 National Census, the city's population was 49,077 in 12,828 households. The following census in 2011 counted 52,694 people in 14,858 households. The 2016 census measured the population of the city as 57,071 people in 17,228 households.

== Geography ==
=== Weather and climate ===
Borujen has a Continental climate in Köppen climate classification, with warm to hot and dry summers (Dsa). In the climate classification scheme created by Karimi, Borujen has a semi-humid climate with temperate summers and very cold winters. In most classification schemes, Borujen's climate is classified as Arid (as in De Martone) or Semi-arid (as in Ivanov and Barat).

The City's weather station is located on an altitude of about 2197 m above sea level. Its climate is usually a combination of moderate summers and very cold winters. The landscape and plant cover is that of steppes. The maximum observed temperature was 36.6 °C, and the lowest was −26.8 °C.

Borujen is well known for its extremely cold weather, and experiences 132 days with frost annually. The relative humidity is generally low, and averages 38% in year. Cloud cover decreases in the spring, reaches its minimum in the summer, and increases again with the start of the fall season, and reaches its maximum in winter. On average there are only 21 days per year with full cloud cover, and sunshine is the highest among the province's cities.

Climate data for Boroujen (1988–2005, elevation = 2197 m)
Month	Jan	Feb	Mar	Apr	May	Jun	Jul	Aug	Sep	Oct	Nov	Dec	Year
Mean daily maximum °C (°F)	3.8 (38.8)	6.4 (43.5)	11.0 (51.8)	17.1 (62.8)	22.7 (72.9)	28.7 (83.7)	31.5 (88.7)	31.0 (87.8)	27.2 (81.0)	20.7 (69.3)	13.4 (56.1)	8.0 (46.4)	18.5 (65.2)
Daily mean °C (°F)	−1.9 (28.6)	0.6 (33.1)	4.8 (40.6)	10.2 (50.4)	14.6 (58.3)	19.1 (66.4)	22.2 (72.0)	21.3 (70.3)	17.3 (63.1)	11.9 (53.4)	6.2 (43.2)	1.9 (35.4)	10.7 (51.2)
Mean daily minimum °C (°F)	−7.7 (18.1)	−5.2 (22.6)	−1.4 (29.5)	3.3 (37.9)	6.5 (43.7)	9.5 (49.1)	13.0 (55.4)	11.6 (52.9)	7.4 (45.3)	3.0 (37.4)	−0.9 (30.4)	−4.2 (24.4)	2.9 (37.2)
Average precipitation mm (inches)	45.3 (1.78)	33.6 (1.32)	54.1 (2.13)	27.4 (1.08)	8.9 (0.35)	1.2 (0.05)	0.8 (0.03)	0.1 (0.00)	0.2 (0.01)	5.2 (0.20)	23.7 (0.93)	53.7 (2.11)	254.2 (9.99)
Average relative humidity (%)	60	53	47	40	33	24	24	23	24	34	45	54	38
Average dew point °C (°F)	−9.0 (15.8)	−8.4 (16.9)	−6.2 (20.8)	−2.9 (26.8)	−0.9 (30.4)	−0.8 (30.6)	2.3 (36.1)	0.8 (33.4)	−2.2 (28.0)	−3.2 (26.2)	−5.1 (22.8)	−7.0 (19.4)	−3.5 (25.6)
Mean monthly sunshine hours	215.0	226.8	242.8	256.4	333.4	359.8	342.3	341.5	319.2	293.6	230.0	219.4	3,380.2
Source: IRIMO

== Higher education ==
Borujen hosts several higher education institutes:

- Payam-e-Noor University of Boroujen (in Persian)
- Islamic Azad University of Boroujen (in Persian)
- Nursing Faculty of Boroujen (in Persian)
- Boroujen Technical School (in Persian)

== Gallery ==
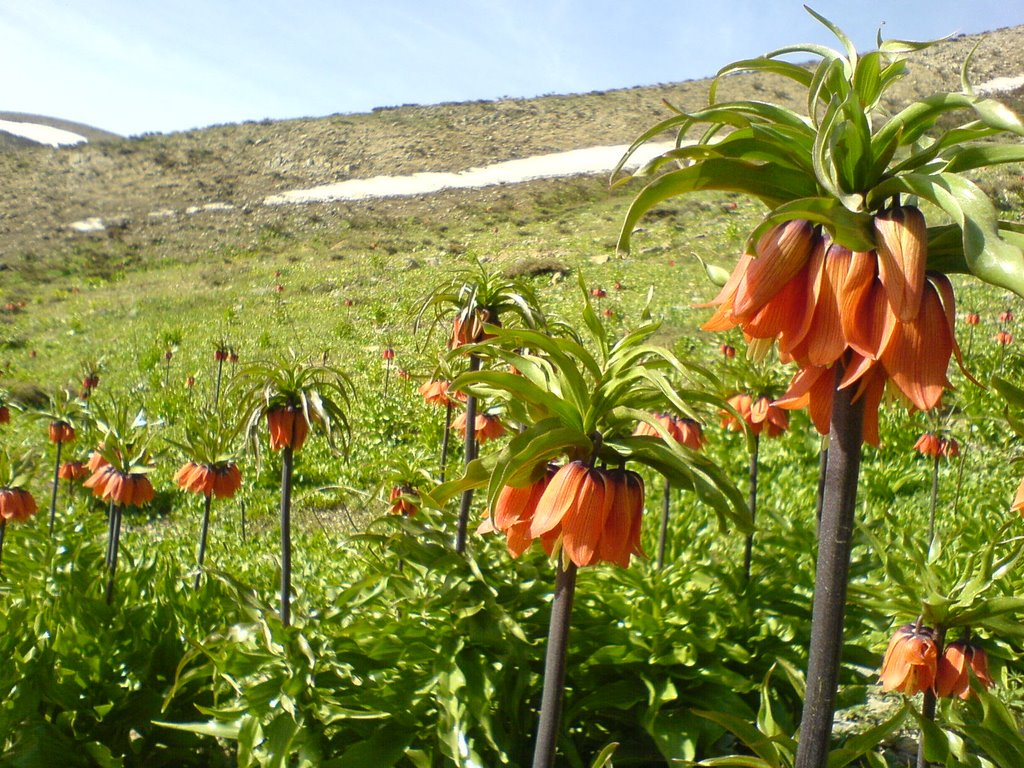
Inverted Tulips, Siasard Area

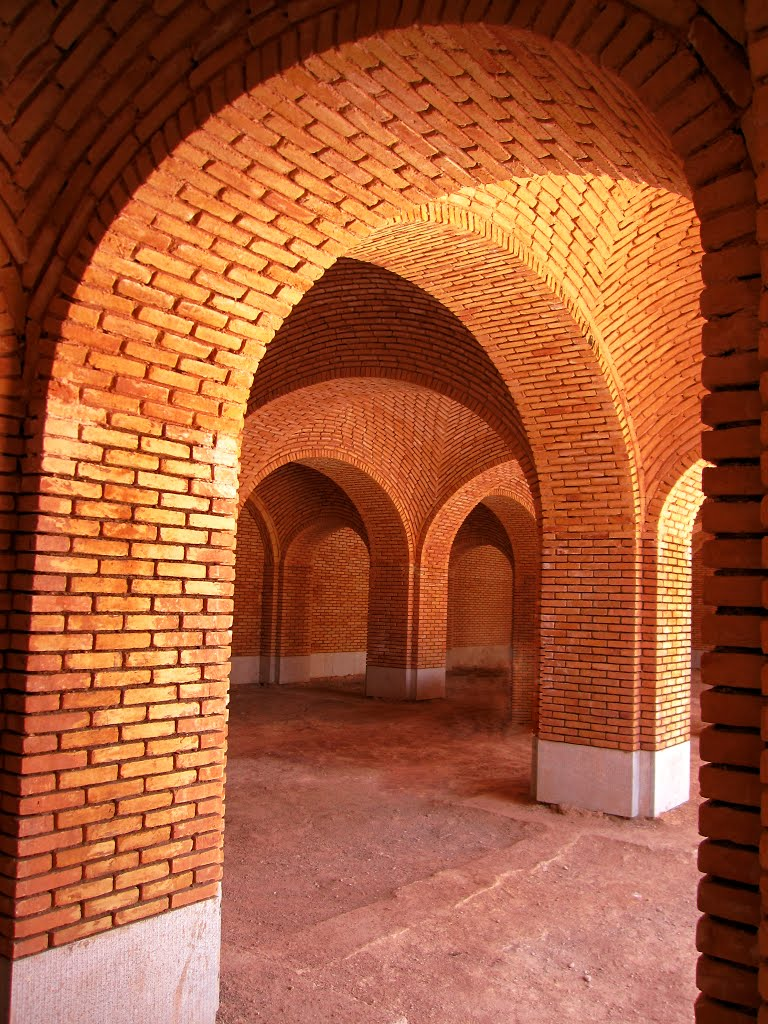
Mosalla Bridge

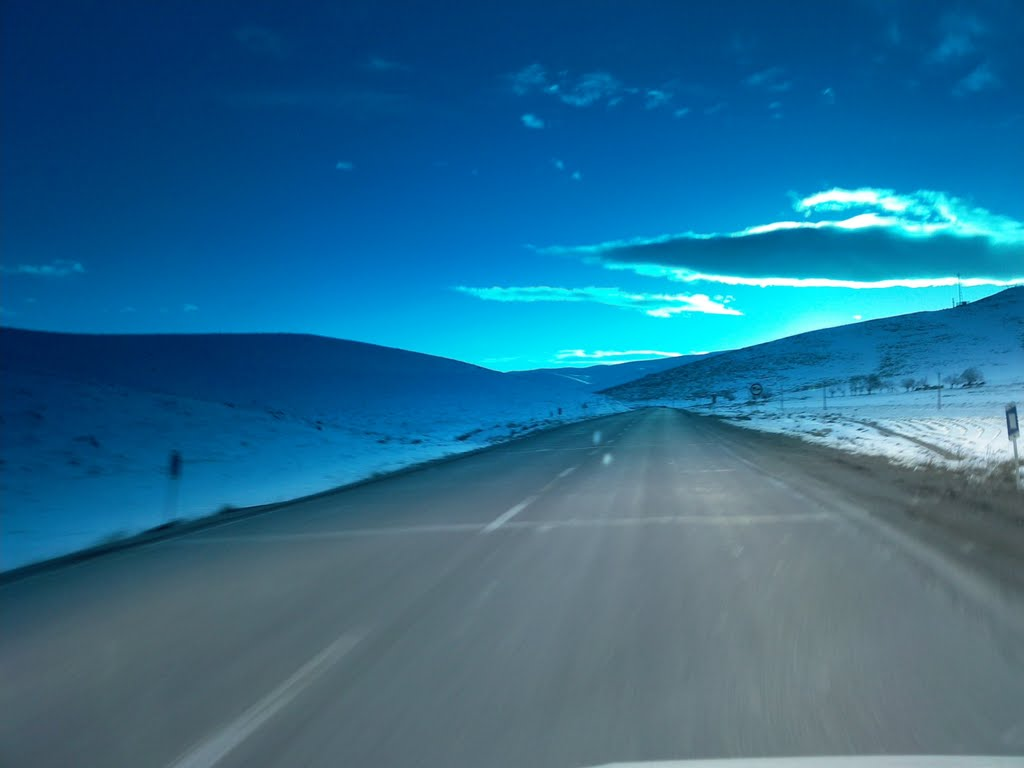
Boroujen-Isfahan Road

== See also ==
Media related to Borujen at Wikimedia Commons
