= AH72 =

Road in Iran

Asian Highway 72
- Map of AH72 in red

Route information
- Length: 1,042 km (647 mi)

Major junctions
- North end: Tehran, Iran
- South end: Bushehr, Iran

Location
- Countries: Iran

Highway system
- Asian Highway Network
← AH71	→ AH75

Asian Highway 72 (AH72) is a road in the Asian Highway Network running 1042 km (647 miles) from Tehran to Bushehr, Iran. The route is as follows:

== Iran ==
- Freeway 7: Tehran - Qom - Murcheh Khvort
- Road 65: Murcheh Khvort - Shahinshahr
- Freeway 9: Shahinshahr - Isfahan
- Road 65: Isfahan - Izadkhast
- Freeway 7: Izadkhast - Shiraz
- Road 86: Shiraz - Qaemiyeh (Chenar Shahijan)
- Road 55: Qaemiyeh (Chenar Shahijan) - Bushehr
