= Road 65 (Iran) =

Road in Iran

Road 65
- جاده 65

Route information
- Part of AH72
- Length: 1,208 km (751 mi)

Major junctions
- From: Tehran, Tehran; Azadegan Expressway; Saidi Expressway
- Freeway 5 Freeway 6 Road 49; Road 48; Road 56; Road 58; Road 586; Road 587; Road 665; Freeway 7 Road 47; Freeway 9 (Mo'allem Freeway); Road 656; Road 551; Road 72; Road 63; Road 78; Road 122; Shiraz Ringway; Road 67; Road 86; Road 94
- To: Bandar Siraf, Bushehr; Road 96

Location
- Country: Iran
- Provinces: Bushehr, Fars, Isfahan, Mrkazi, Qom, Tehran
- Major cities: Eslamshahr, Tehran; Saveh, Markazi; Salafchegan, Qom; Delijan, Markazi; Meymeh, Isfahan; Shahin Shahr, Isfahan; Isfahan, Isfahan; Shahreza, Isfahan; Abadeh, Fars; Marvdasht, Fars; Shiraz, Fars; Firuzabad, Fars; Jam, Bushehr

Highway system
- Highways in Iran; Freeways

Road 65 is an important transit road connecting the North and South of Iran. The road travels through the provinces of Tehran, Markazi, Isfahan, Fars, and Bushehr. Covering a total of 1,208 kilometers, it is the sixth longest route in the country.

== Plans ==
=== Saveh ===
Saveh Bypass is now under construction.

=== Abadeh ===
Abadeh Bypass is now completed and operational travelling northeast of the city of Abadeh.

=== Abadeh–Shiraz ===
Saadatshahr Tunnel, located between Saadat Shahr and Qaderabad, was closed for repairs and lighting related works from 22 November 2011 to mid-February 2012.

=== Shiraz–Firouzabad ===
The road is under construction to be improved to 2+2 expressway.

=== Firouzabad–Jam–Asaluyeh ===
There are plans to build another 2 lanes and make the road a 4-lane expressway.

== Gallery ==
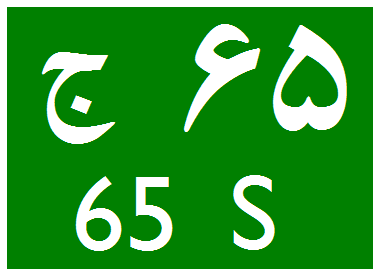
Diagram of road number sign of Road 65 southbound in the 1990s

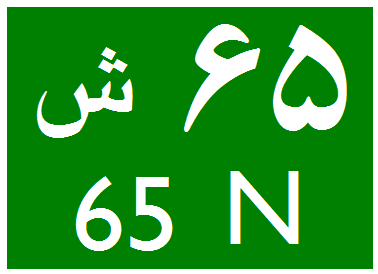
Diagram of road number sign of Road 65 northbound in the 1990s
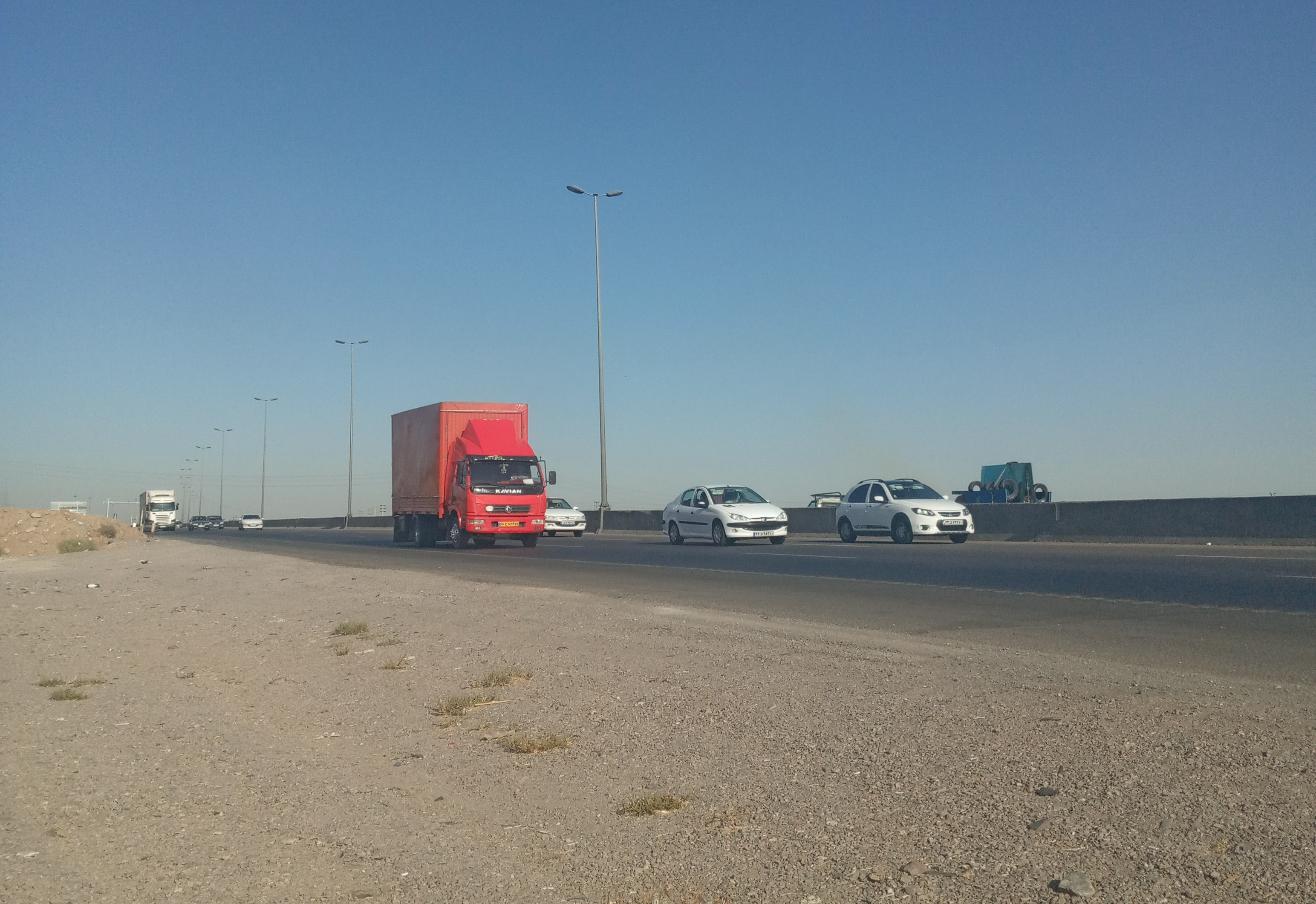

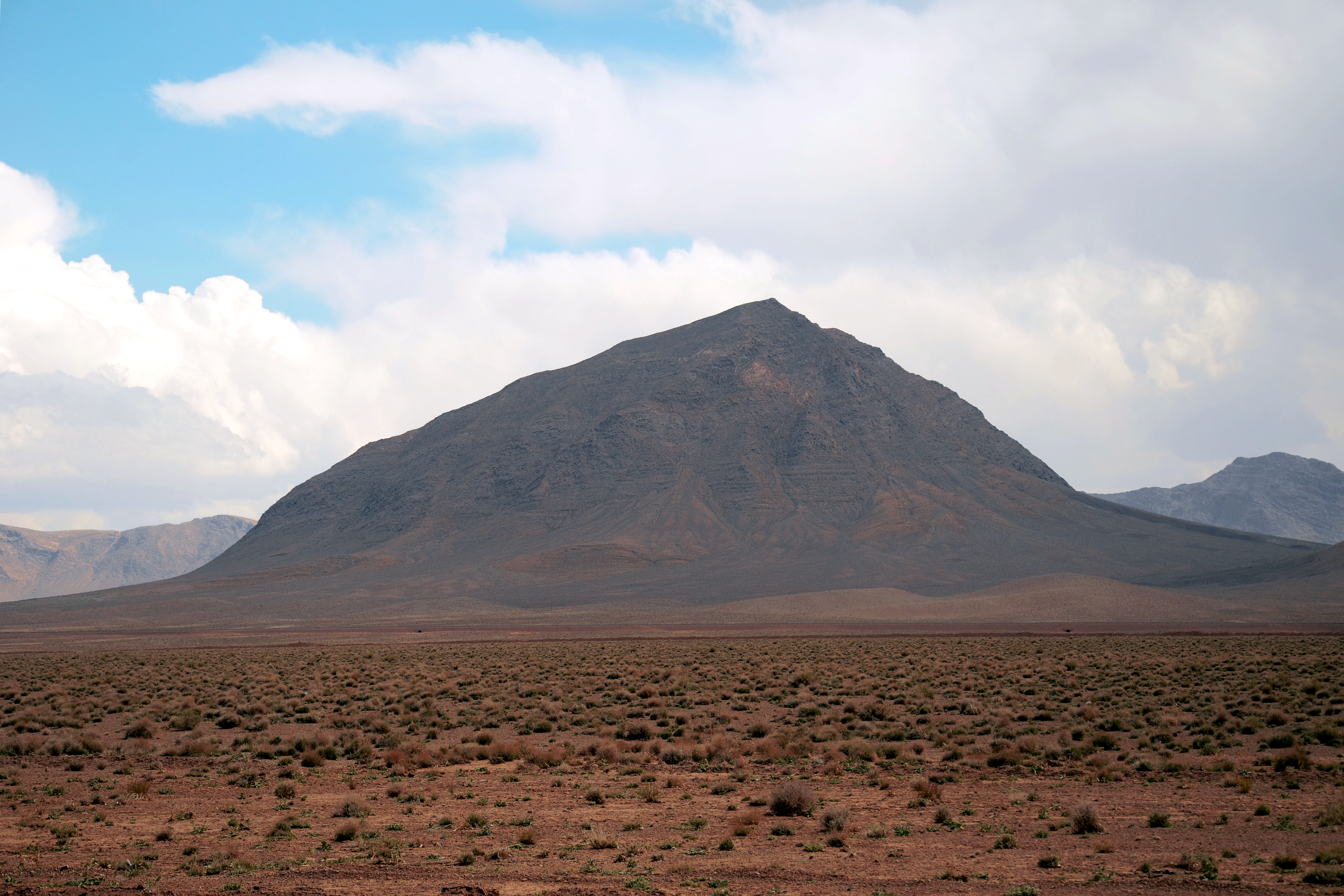

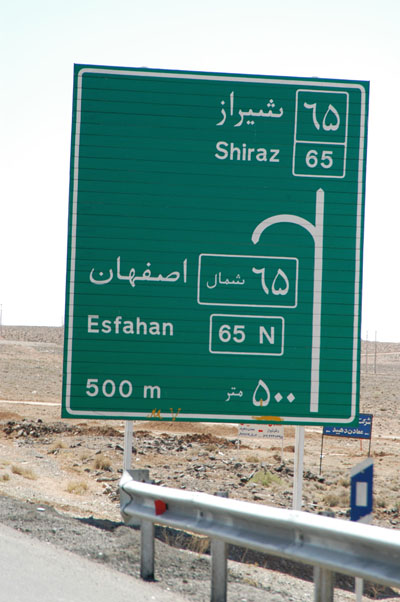
