= Freeways in Iran =

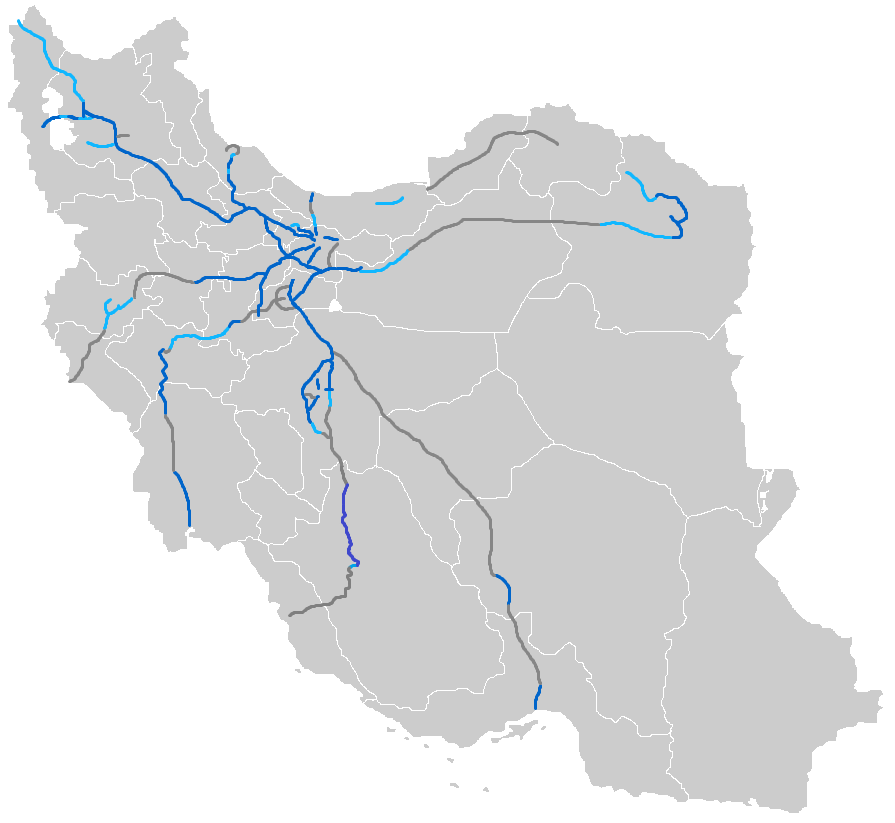
Freeway network plan

The history of Freeways in Iran goes back to 55 years ago. The first freeway in Iran, Freeway 2 was built before the Iranian Revolution, between Tehran and Karaj. The construction of Tehran-Qom Freeway was started and the studies of many freeways today started before the revolution. Today, Iran has about 2,400 kilometres (1,500 mi) of freeway. The total AADT of the system is 144 Million vehicles.

== Numbered List ==
=== Freeway 1 ===
Sign	Name	Situation
	Qazvin-Rasht	Completed

=== Freeway 2 ===
Sign	Name	Situation
	Mashhad Northern Bypass	Completed
	Mashhad-Baghche	Completed
	Mashhad-Molkabad	Under construction
	Baghche-Neyshabur	Planned
	Neyshabur-Semnan	Planned
	Semnan-Garmsar	Completed on section 2, Under construction on section 1 and 3
	Qom-Garmsar	Completed
	Tehran Southern Bypass (Ghadir Freeway)	Completed
	Tehran-Karaj	Completed
	Tehran-Karaj (Shohadaye Alborz Freeway)	Completed
	Karaj Northern Bypass	Completed on section 2, 3 and east-west lane of section 4, Under construction on section 1 and west-east line of section 4
	Karaj-Qazvin	Completed
	Qazvin-Zanjan	Completed
	Zanjan-Tabriz	Completed
	Tabriz Southern Bypass	Completed
	Tabriz Western Bypass	Completed
	Tabriz-Bazargan	Completed one section 1, Under construction on section 2 and 3

=== Freeway 3 ===
Sign	Name	Situation
	Tehran-Shomal	Completed on section 1, 2 and 4, Under construction on section 3

=== Freeway 5 ===
Sign	Name	Situation
	Amol-Haraz	Planned
	Haraz-Pardis	Under Construction
	Pardis-Tehran	Completed
	Tehran-Saveh	Completed
	Saveh-Salafchegan	Completed
	Qom-Salafchegan-Arak	Under construction
	Arak Northern Bypass Freeway	Completed on one lane, Under construction on second lane
	Arak-Borujerd-Khorramabad	Completed on section 2, 3 & 4, Under construction on section 1
	Khorramabad-Andimeshk	Completed
	Andimeshk-Ahvaz	Under construction
	Ahvaz-Bandar Khomeini	Completed

=== Freeway 6 ===
Sign	Name	Situation
	Saveh-Hamadan Freeway	Completed
	Hamadan-Bisotun Freeway	Planned
	Bisuton-Kermanshah Freeway	Under construction
	Kermanshah Bypass Freeway	Under construction
	Kermanshah-Homeyl Freeway	Under construction
	‌Homeyl-Khosravi Freeway	Planned

=== Freeway 7 ===
Sign	Name	Situation
	Tehran-Qom (Persian Gulf Freeway)	Completed
	Qom-Kashan (Amir Kabir Freeway)	Completed
	Kashan-Natanz	Completed
	Natanz-Isfahan	Completed
	Isfahan Western Bypass	Completed
	Isfahan Eastern Bypass	Completed on section 1 and 2, Under construction on section 3
	Isfahan-Shiraz	Completed on section 1 to 6, Under construction on section 7, Planned on section 8
	Shiraz-Bushehr	Planned
	Bandar Abbas-Shahid Rajaee Port	Completed

=== Freeway 9 ===
Sign	Name	Situation
	Isfahan-Shahinshahr	Completed

=== Freeway 16 ===
Sign	Name	Situation
	Tabriz-Urmia	Completed on section 1, 2 and 4, Under construction on section 3, 5 and 6
	Tabriz-Sahand	Completed

=== Freeway 21 ===
Sign	Name	Situation
	Tehran Eastern Bypass (Shahid Shushtari)	Completed on section 1, Under construction on section 2.

=== Freeway 24 ===
Sign	Name	Situation
	Maragheh-Hashtrud	Completed on section 2, Under construction on section 1 and 3
	Bonab-Maragheh	Under construction
	Naqadeh-Bonab	Planned
	Piranshahr-Naqadeh	Planned
	Tamrchin-Piranshahr	Planned

=== Freeway 51 ===
Sign	Name	Situation
	Isfahan-Zarrinshahr (Zobahan Freeway)	Completed

=== Freeway 56 ===
Sign	Name	Situation
	Qom Western Bypass	Completed on section 1, Under construction on section 2, 3 and connecting section 1 to Tehran-Qom Freeway.

=== Freeway 96 ===
Sign	Name	Situation
	Bandar Mahshahr Northern Bypass	Completed on section 1 and 2, Under construction on section 3.

== Under construction or planned ==
Sign	Name	Situation
	Isfahan Eastern Bypass	Completed on section 1 and 2, Under construction on section 3.
	Karaj Northern Bypass	6.5 km of active route and opening of the rest of the route in Farvardin 1404 (April 2025).
	Tabriz-Urmia	Sections one and two and four are completed, Sections three and five and six are under construction (chance of completion of section 3 in 1405 (2026))
	Maragheh-Hashtrud	Sections 2 and 3 are active, sections 1, 4, and 5 are under construction. Section 4 is likely to open in last days of 1404 (March 2026).
	Sirjan-Bandarabbas	phase of Sirjan bypass is approved government and others are waiting for to be approved government.
	Mashhad-Bojnurd-Gorgan	phase of Mashhad-Chenaran is under construction (chance of complete in 1404 (2025)), phase of Chenaran-Qochan is to be approved government and phase of Bojnurd-Gorgan is waiting for to be approved government.
	Kerman-Bandarabbas	It is approved government
	Gorgan-Sari-Rasht	phase of Sari-Qaemshahr is under construction (possibly opening in 1407 (2028)). phase of Qaemshahr-Amol and phase of Chaboksar-Sangar are on planned and others are waiting for to be approved government.
	Natanz-Sirjan	phase of Natanz-Ardakan is on planned, phase of Ardakan-Anar is approved government and phase of Anar-Sirjan is waiting for to be approved government.
	Parsian-Lamerd	It is approved government
	Shiraz-Bushehr	Planned
	Shiraz-Firuzabad-Jam	It is waiting for to be approved government.
	Tehran-Shomal Freeway	Sections 1 and 4 and the western runway of section 2 have been completed. The western runway of section 2 is under operation and its eastern runway is likely to open in the spring of 1404 (2025). The operational operations of section 3 have begun.
	Haram ta Haram freeway	Completed on phase of Mashhad-Baghche and phase of Qom-Garmsar, phase of Mashhad-Malekabad and phase of Semnan-Garmsar Under construction (chance of complete phase of Semnan-Garmsar in First days of 1404 (2025)), phase of Baghche-Neishabor is approved government and phase of Neishabor-Semnan is waiting for to be approved government.
	Karbala freeway	Completed on phase of Saveh-Hamedan, phase of Biston-Kermanshah and Kermanshah-Homeyl Under construction, phase of Hamedan-Biston and Kermanshah-Khosravi Planned.
	Ahvaz-Khorramabad-Arak-Tehran freeway	phase of Arak-Borojerd، Band 2 of Arak northern bypass، Salafchegan-Qom under construction. phase of Ahvaz-Andimshak، Arak-Rahjerd and Pardis-Bomehen are on Planned and phase of Rahjerd-Salafchegan and Qom southern bypass are approved government.
	Qom western bypass freeway	Section 1 have been completed in early 2026, The section 2, 3 and the connection of the section 1 to Tehran-Qom Freeway under construction.
	Isfahan-Shiraz freeway	Section 7 of phase of Shiraz-Izadkhast Under construction, phase of Isfahan-Izadkhast is on planned and phase of end of Isfahan western bypass is waiting for to be approved government.
	Tabriz-Bazargan Freeway	The Tabriz-Sufian section has been completed. (The Sufian-Marand expressway will be opened in Esfand 1404 (March 2026)). The Marand-Ivaoghli section is on Planned, and the Ivaoghli-Maku-Bazargan section was approved by the Cabinet.
	Homeyl-Ilam freeway	It is waiting for to be approved government.
	Ahvaz-Isfahan freeway	phase of Izeh-Lordegan is on planned and others are waiting for to be approved government.
	Tehran-Amol freeway	It is waiting for to be approved government.
	Charmshahr-Bomehen freeway	Planned
	Tabriz-Ahar-Baku freeway	It is waiting for to be approved government.
	Bushehr-Asaloyeh freeway	It is waiting for to be approved government.
	Birjand-Baghche freeway	It is waiting for to be approved government.
	Salafchegan-Isfahan freeway	It is waiting for to be approved government.
	Mashhad-Sarakhs freeway	It is waiting for to be approved government.
	Qom-Saveh-Takestan freeway	It is waiting for to be approved government.
	Loushan-Ardabil-Baku freeway	It is waiting for to be approved government.
	Hamedan-Sanandaj-Marivan freeway	It is waiting for to be approved government.
	Sadeh-Yasouj freeway	It is waiting for to be approved government.
	Azarshahr-Saghez freeway	It is waiting for to be approved government.
	Marand-Jolfa freeway	It is waiting for to be approved government.
	Nazarabad-Takestan freeway	planned
	Urumia eastern bypass freeway	planned
	Khoy-Razi freeway	It is waiting for to be approved government.
	Mayamei-Jajram-Qochan freeway	It is waiting for to be approved government.
	Bandare emam-Behbahan freeway	It is waiting for to be approved government.
	Ahvaz-Khorramshahr-Abadan freeway	It is waiting for to be approved government.
	Naein-Isfahan freeway	It is waiting for to be approved government.
	Sepidan-Shiraz-Jahrom-Lar-Bandare Abbas freeway	It is waiting for to be approved government.
	Maragheh-Tamarchin freeway	It is waiting for to be approved government.
	Bandare khamir-Bandare shahid rajaei-Bandarabbas-Minab freeway	It is waiting for to be approved government.
