= Freeway 2 (Iran) =

Road in Iran

Freeway 2
- 2 آزادراه
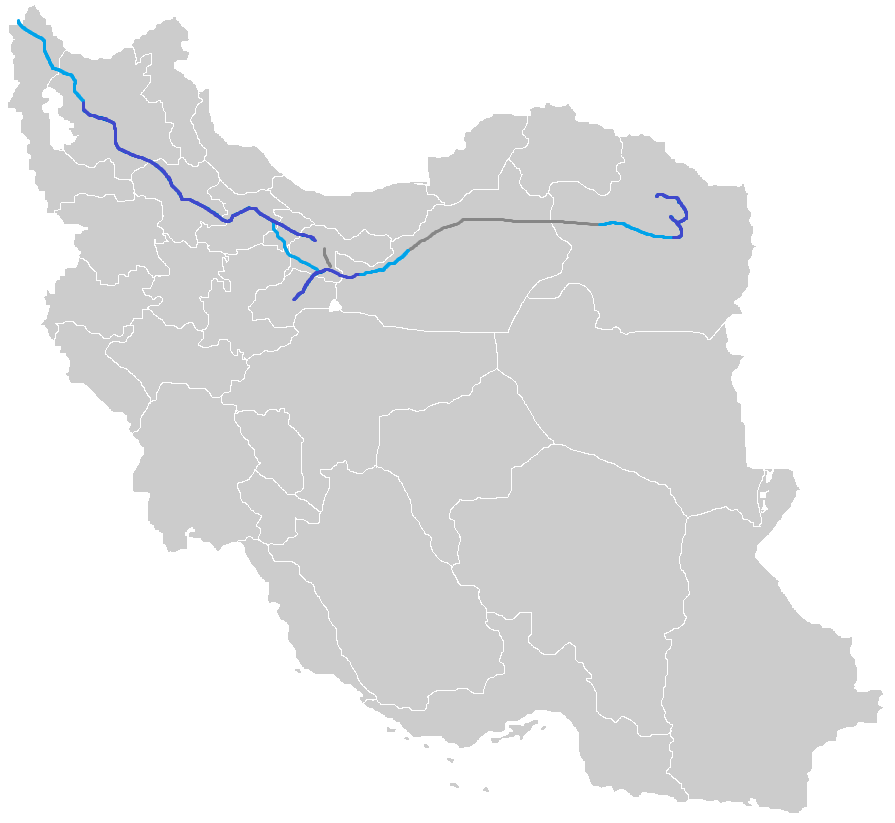

Route information
- Part of AH1 AH8 AH75

Tehran - Tabriz - Bazargan Freeway
- Length: 626 km (389 mi)
- From: Tehran, Tehran (48) Azadegan Expressway (48) Mahdavi Kani Expressway
- Major intersections: Road 32; Road 59; Freeway 1 Road 49; To Road 37; To Road 47; Road 35; Road 15; Road 26; Road 24; Road 16; Road 21; Freeway 16
- To: Tabriz, East Azerbaijan; Road 14-21-32

Ghadir Freeway Tehran Southern Bypass Freeway
- Length: 158 km (98 mi)
- From: Abyek Qazvin; Karaj - Qazvin Freeway
- Major intersections: Road 38; Road 65; Tehran - Saveh Freeway; Road 71; Tehran - Qom Freeway
- To: Charmshahr, Tehran; Qom - Garmsar Freeway

Haram ta Haram Freeway Shrine to Shrine Freeway Qom - Garmsar Freeway
- Length: 149 km (93 mi)
- From: Garmsar, Semnan; Road 44
- Major intersections: Ghadir Freeway
- To: Qom, Qom; Freeway 7

Haram ta Haram Freeway Shrine to Shrine Freeway Mashhad - Baghcheh Freeway
- Length: 37 km (23 mi)
- From: Mashhad, Khorasan Razavi; Road 44; Road 97
- Major intersections: Mashhad Northern Bypass Freeway; Road 97
- To: Baghcheh, Khorasan Razavi; Road 44

Mashhad Northern Bypass Freeway
- Length: 71 km (44 mi)
- From: Mashhad, Khorasan Razavi; Mashhad - Baghcheh Freeway
- Major intersections: Road 22
- To: Mashhad, Khorasan Razavi; Road 22

Location
- Country: Iran
- Provinces: Khorasan Razavi, Semnan, Qom, Tehran, Alborz, Qazvin, Zanjan, East Azerbaijan
- Major cities: Mashhad, Khorasan Razavi; Garmsar, Semnan; Qom, Qom; Tehran, Tehran; Karaj, Alborz; Qazvin, Qazvin; Takestan, Qazvin; Zanjan, Zanjan; Tabriz, East Azerbaijan

Highway system
- Highways in Iran; Freeways

Freeway 2 (Persian: آزادراه ۲) in Iran consists of two separate sections, one in northwestern Iran and one in northeastern Iran.

== Western Section ==
The western section of Freeway 2 runs from the capital city Tehran to Tabriz in northwestern Iran. This freeway is an important transit road that connects Iran's industrial zones to Tabriz and Turkey. The section between Tehran and Karaj is one of the busiest sections in Iran with annual average daily traffic (AADT) of 217084. Karaj-Qazvin has an AADT of 79606.

From West to East
Bazargan Customs; Turkey; AH1 E80 Gerede Gürbulak Otoyolu (Turkish page) (planned); Gürbulak
Under Construction
Sufian-Shabestar Road; East to Sufian-Marand-Bazargan; West to Shabestar
Road 14-21-32; West to Marand-Salmas-Jolfa-Bazargan; East to Tabriz
Mayan Road; Towards Khvajeh Dizaj - Alvar-e Sofla - Mayan-e Olya
Tabriz Petrochemical Company
Tabriz
Road 16-21; South to Sardrud-Urmia-Miandoab; Mellat Boulevard
Vadi-e Rahmat Cemetery
Sahandiyeh Boulevard; Tabriz-Sahand-Urmia Freeway
Niayesh Boulevard; Tabriz College of Technology
Mashruteh Boulevard Tabriz Bus Terminal
Yadegar-e Emam (Sahand) Stadium
Maralan
Mollasadra Boulevard
El Goli Service Station
El-Gölü Bakeri Boulevard El Goli Metro Station
Kasaei Expressway
Shadabad-e Olya
Tabriz
Road 16-32; West to Tabriz; East to Bostanabad
Tabriz Toll Station
Road 16-32; West to Tabriz; East to Bostanabad-Ardabil-Mianeh
Bostanabad Toll Station
Maragheh-Hashtrud Freeway; Towards Hashtrud
Qarah Aghaj; Road 24; West to Maragheh; East to Hashtrud
Maragheh-Hashtrud Freeway; Towards Maragheh-Miandoab
Road 26; West to Qareh Aghaj-Miandoab; East to Mianeh
East Azerbaijan Province; Zanjan Province
Road 15; North to Aqkand-Ardabil; Towards Road 32
Azarbaijan Service Station
Zanjan-West Toll Station
Service Station
Road 35; South to Bijar-Sanandaj; Zanjan
Road 32; East to Soltaniyeh-Abhar; Zanjan
Zanjan-East Toll Station
Abbar
Sorkheh Dizaj
Towards Road 32 West to Zanjan-East to Abhar; Towards Road 47 South to Soltaniyeh-Qidar
Shahr-e Aftab Service Station
Ghazal Service Station
Khorramdarreh; Towards Road 32
Abhar; Towards Road 32
Zanjan Province; Qazvin Province
Towards Road 32
Takestan; Towards Road 32; Towards Road 37; South to Hamadan
Qazvin-West Toll Station
Road 49; North To Kuhin-Rasht; Qazvin
Qazvin-Rasht Freeway; North to Rasht
Aftab-e Derakhshan Service Station
Qazvin; Solimani Boulevard
Imam Khomeini International University; Qazvin; Nokhbegan Boulevard
Alvand; Towards Road 32; West to Qazvin; East to Mohammadiyeh-Abyek
Qazvin-East Toll Station
Qazvin
Service Station
Mohammadiyeh
Caspian Industrial Park
Shahid Rajaei Power Plant
Service Station
Ghadir Freeway; Towards Qom-Saveh- Imam Khomeini International Airport-Garmsar-Mashhad
Taleqan; Towards Road 32
Abyek
Qazvin Province; Alborz Province
Nazarabad; Towards Road 32
Hashtgerd Tehran Metro Hashtgerd Metro Station
Hashtgerd; Shahr-e Jadid-e Hashtgerd
Kuhsar
Mammut Industrial Park Tehran Metro Mammut Metro Station
Kamal Shahr; Kordan
Service Station
Road 32; West to Kamalshahr-Hashtgerd; Karaj
Karaj Northern bypass Freeway; Towards Chalus
Karaj
Karaj Toll Station
Golshahr; Mehrshahr
Golshahr Tehran Metro Golshahr Metro Station
Mehrvila
Karaj-Center; Mohammadshahr; Mahdasht Tehran Metro Mohammad Shahr (Mahdasht) Metro Station
Karaj-Center
Karaj-Center; Fardis Tehran Metro Karaj Metro Station
Road 59; North to Chalus; Karaj Makhsus Expressway
Karaj
Garmdarreh
Alborz Province; Tehran Province
Tehran
Road 32 (Lashkari Expressway); Shohada-e Alborz Freeway
Shahrak-e Daneshgah-e Sharif Tehran Metro Vardavard Metro Station
Pajuhesh Boulevard
Azadshahr; Peykanshahr Tehran Metro Iran Khodro Metro Station
Chitgar Park; Shahrak-e Golestan
Kuhak Boulevard Tehran Metro Chitgar Metro Station
Azadegan Expressway
Continues as: Sheikh Fazl-allah Nouri Expressway
From East to West

=== Gallery ===
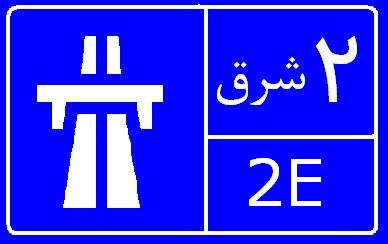
Freeway sign East

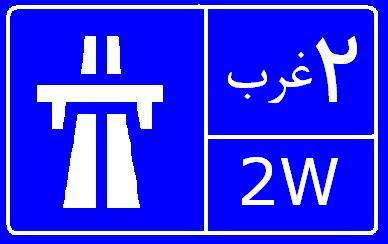
Freeway sign West

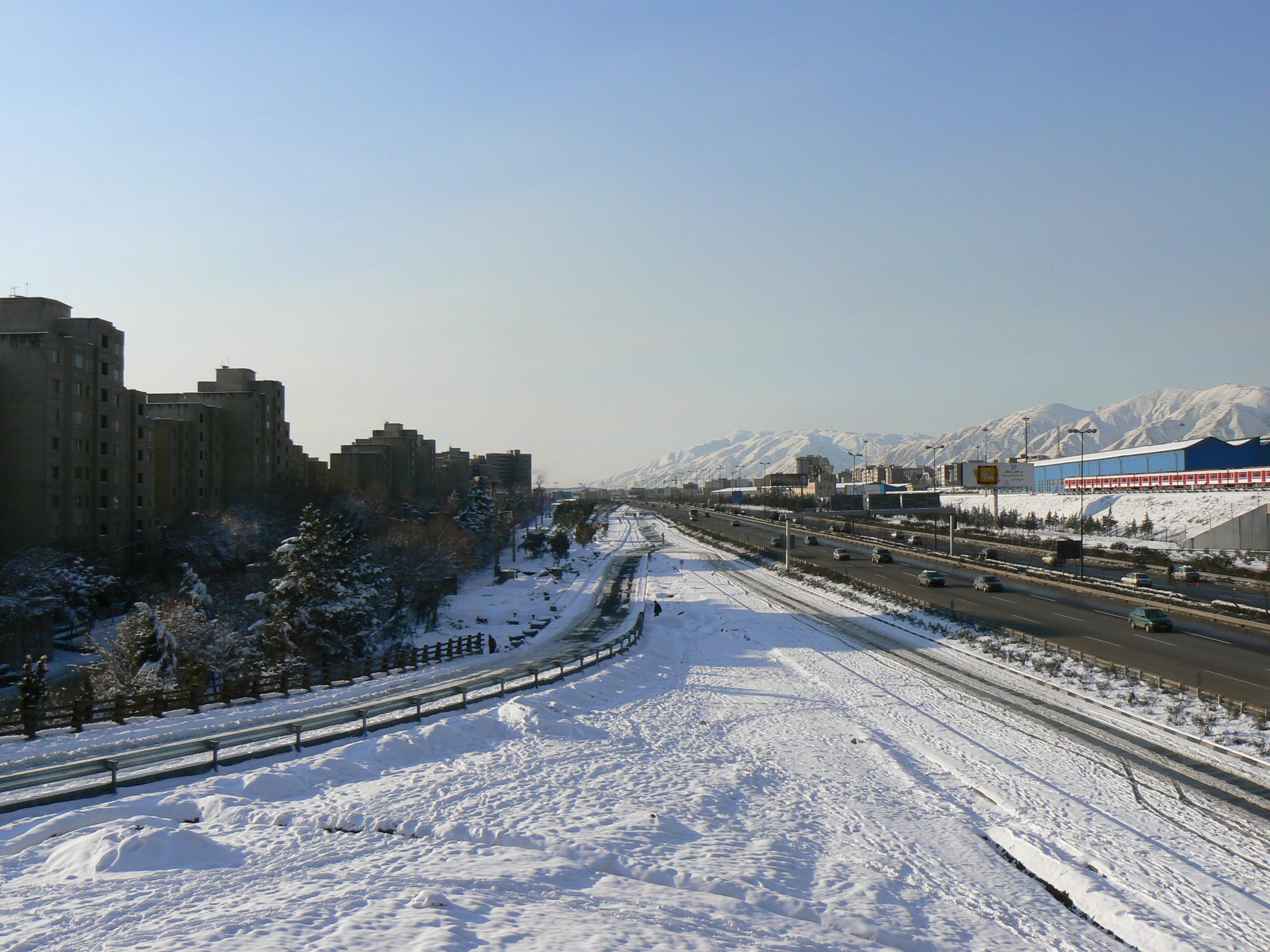
Tehran-Karaj

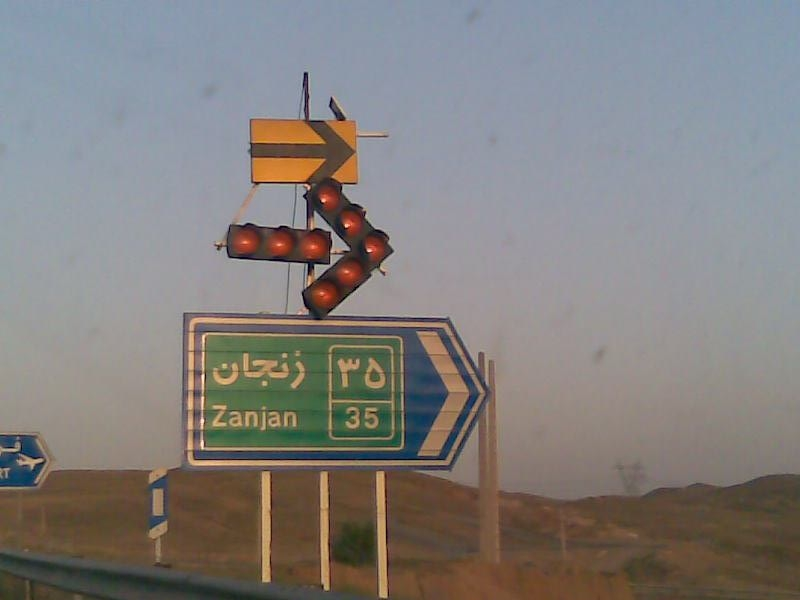
Exit to Zanjan

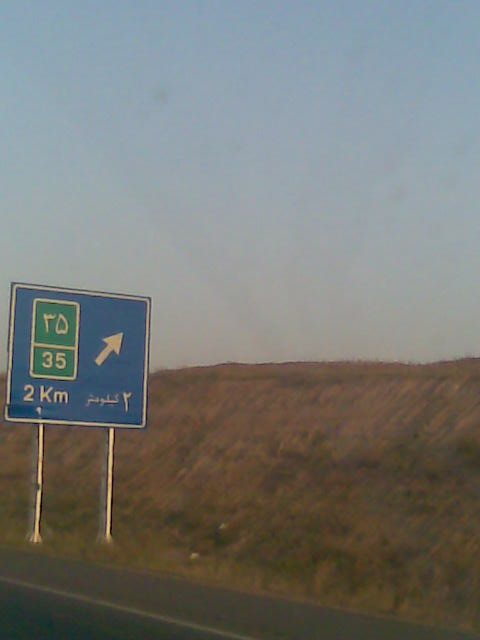
2 km to Exit to Zanjan

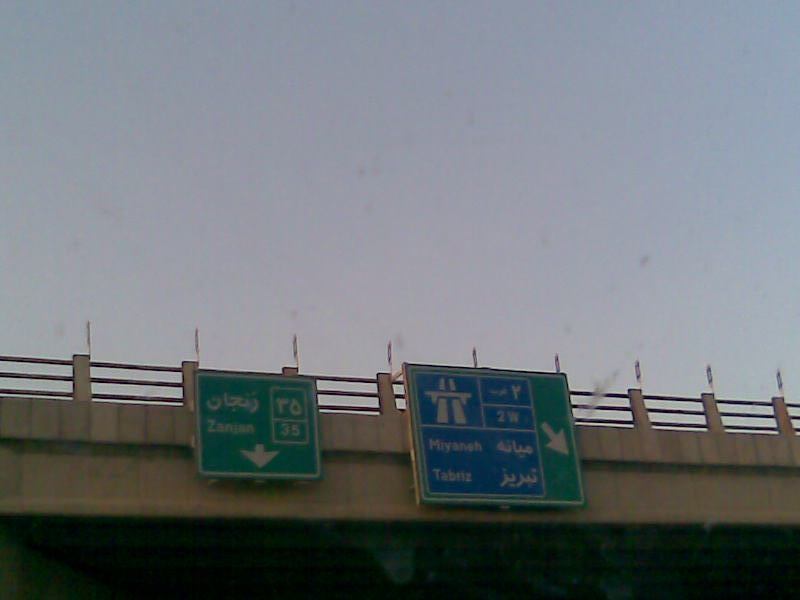
Ramp to Freeway from Road 32

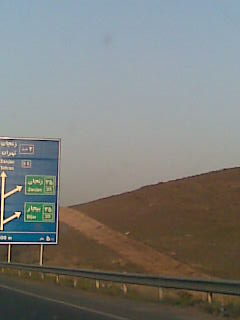
Road 35

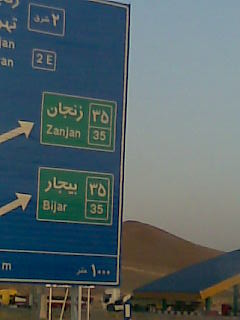
Junction of Road 35

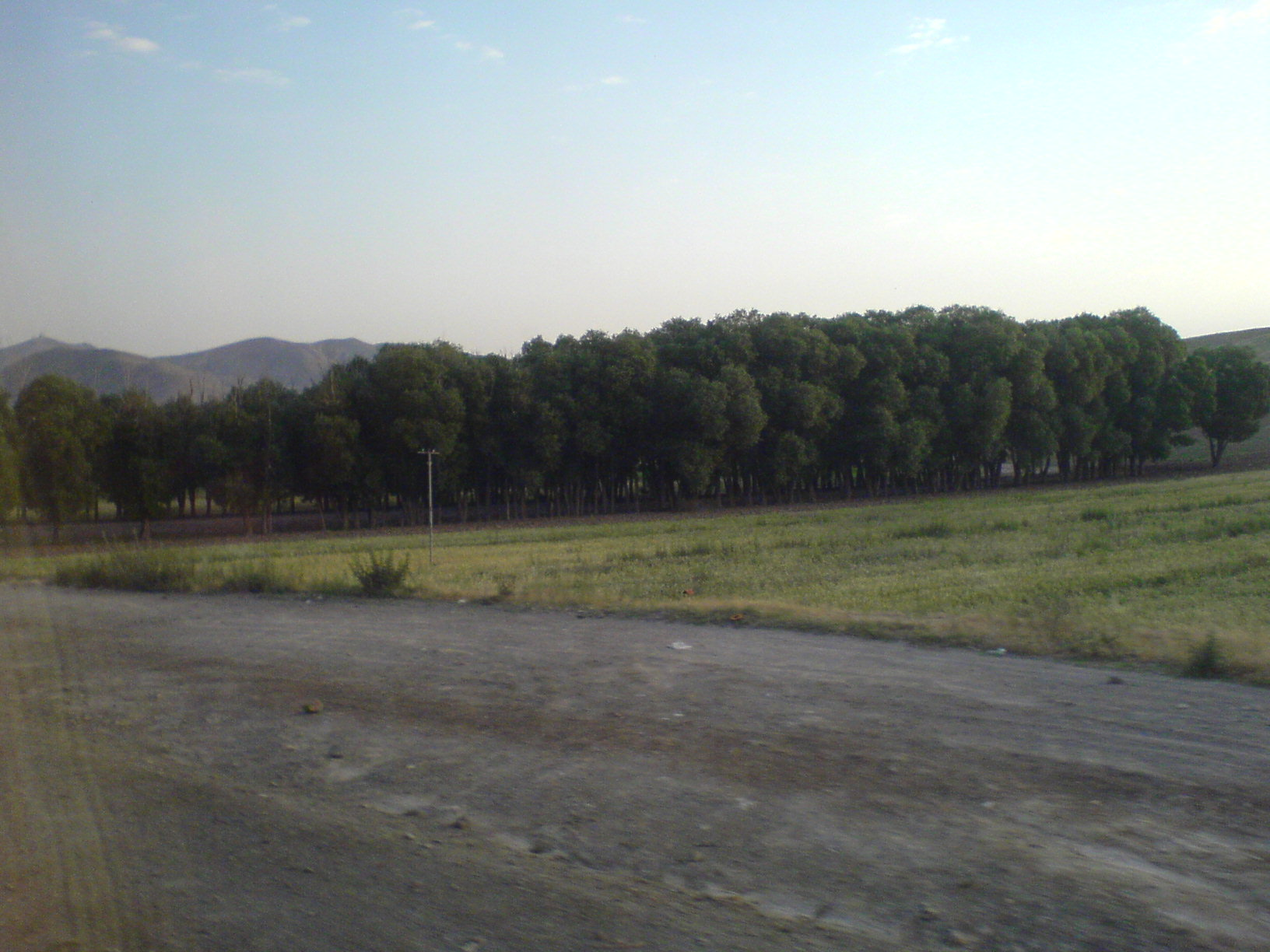
Forest next to Gori Lake, close to Tabriz on the side of Freeway 2W.

== Eastern Section ==
The eastern section of Freeway 2 starts from Mashhad and ends in Baghcheh. There is a project under construction to connect this freeway to Tehran.

From West to East
Qom-Kashan Freeway (Amirkabir Freeway); North to Qom-Tehran; South tl Kashan-Isfahan
Samen ol-A'emmeh Wood and Carpentry Industrial Park
Kavir-e Sorkh Service Station
Qom Toll Station
Haram Ta Haram Service Station
Qom Province; Tehran Province
Ghadir Freeway; Towards Tehran-Saveh- Imam Khomeini International Airport-Qazvin
Charmshahr; North to Ab Barik - Varamin - Tehran
Emamzadeh Abdollah; South to Asgarabad; North to Hasanabad-e Kuh Gach - Qaleh Boland Abardej Railway Station
Tehran Province; Semnan Province
Garmsar Toll Station
Road 44; East to Garmsar
Under Construction
Semnan Province; Razavi Khorasan Province
Under Construction
Road 44; West to Neishabur-Tehran-Torbat-e Heydarieh; East to Mashhad
Baghcheh Toll Station
Road 97; North to Mashhad; South to Fariman-Islam Qala-Herat (AFG)
Mashhad Northern Bypass Freeway; Towards Quchan-Bojnord-Gorgan
Mashhad Toll Station
Road 44; East to Malekabad; Road 97; South to Fariman
Mashhad
Continues as: Kalantari Expressway; Towards Mashhad-Centre
From East to West

== Tehran Southern bypass Section (Ghadir Freeway) ==
From West to East
Karaj-Qazvin freeway East to Abyek-Karaj-Tehran; West to Qazvin-Zanjan
Road 32; East to Abyek-Tehran; West to Qazvin-Takestan
Qazvin province Alborz province
Section 1 Toll Station
Road 38; East to Malard-Shahriar-Tehran; West to Eshtehard-Buin Zahra
Alborz province Tehran province
Section 2 Toll Station
Ghadir Servise Station
Tehran province Markazi province
Road 65; East to Parand-Imam Khomeini International Airport-Tehran; West to Saveh
Tehran-Saveh Freeway; East to Imam Khomeini International Airport-Parand-Tehran; West to Saveh-Hamedan
Markazi province Tehran province
Section 3 Toll Station
Road 71; North to Kahrizak-Tehran; South to Qom
Tehran-Qom freeway (Persian Gulf Freeway); North to Imam Khomeini International Airport-Tehran; South to Qom
Section 4 Toll Station
Haram Ta Haram Freeway; East to Charmshahr-Garmsar-Mashhad; West to Qom
From East To West

== Other sources ==
- Iran Road Maintenance & Transportation Organization
- Road management center of Iran
- Ministry of Roads & Urban Development of Iran
