= Tabriz Southern Bypass Freeway =

Freeway 2
- 2 آزادراه
- Tabriz Southern Bypass Freeway

Route information
- Length: 15.9 km (9.9 mi)

Major junctions
- From: Tabriz, East Azerbaijan; Road 16
- To: Road 21; Road 16

Location
- Country: Iran
- Provinces: East Azerbaijan

Highway system
- Highways in Iran; Freeways

The Tabriz Southern Bypass Freeway is located in the southern part of Tabriz and is part of Freeway 2. There are plans to connect the freeway west towards Turkey.

With the full utilization of the third line of the Tabriz Metro system, which will be 12 kilometers long and include 14 stations, the Shahid Kasaei Freeway will be connected to Azerbaijan Square.

Usually, during the games of the Tractor Sazi Tabriz Football Club, due to the shortage of buses from the Bus Company, spectators of these games walk the 2-kilometer route from Yadegar Imam Stadium to Shahid Kasaei Highway, overcoming many hills and valleys.

From West to East
Road 16-21; South to Sardrud-Urmia-Miandoab; Mellat Boulevard; Shahid Bakeri Freeway (Tabriz Western Bypass); Towards Marand-Bazargan
Vadi-e Rahmat Cemetery
Sahandiyeh Boulevard; Tabriz-Sahand-Urmia Freeway
Niayesh Boulevard; Tabriz College of Technology
Mashruteh Boulevard Tabriz Bus Terminal
Yadegar-e Emam (Sahand) Stadium
Maralan
Mollasadra Boulevard
El Goli Service Station
El-Gölü Bakeri Boulevard El Goli Metro Station
Kasaei Expressway; Zanjan-Tabriz Freeway; Towards Zanjan-Tehran
From East to West
