= Road 31 (Iran) =

Road in Iran

Road 31
- جاده 31
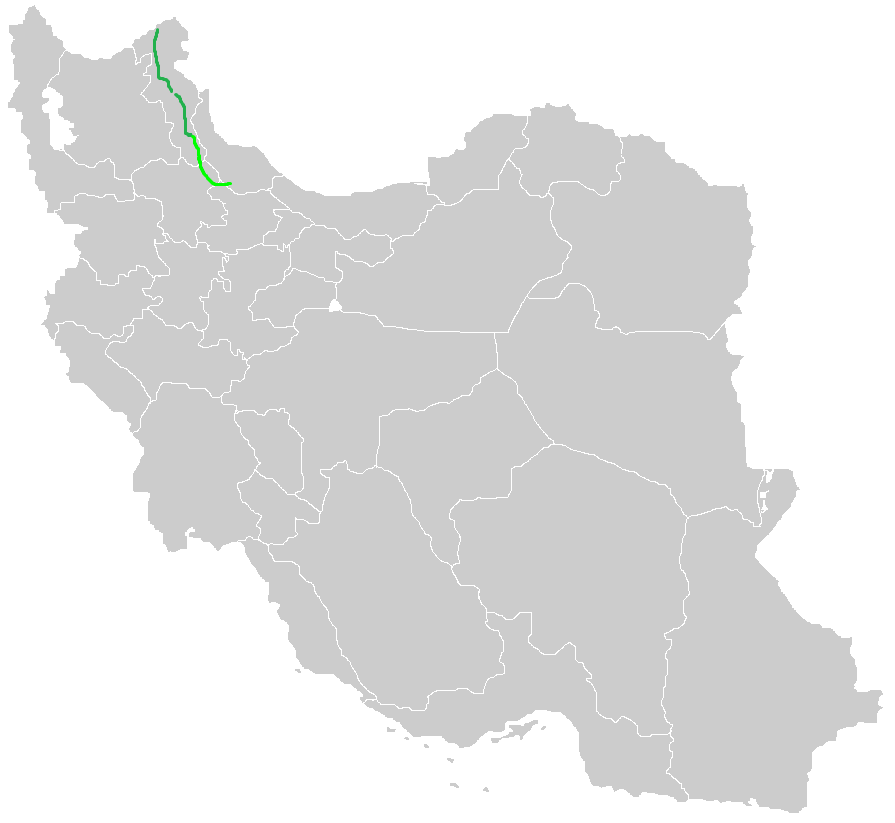

Route information
- Length: 327 km (203 mi)

Major junctions
- From: Sarband (Parsabad), Ardabil; Road 12
- Road 14; Road 16; Road 33; Road 15
- To: Khalkhal, Ardabil; Road 22 / Road 319

Location
- Country: Iran
- Provinces: Ardabil
- Major cities: Ardabil, Ardabil; Khalkhal, Ardabil; Aqkand, East Azerbaijan

Highway system
- Highways in Iran; Freeways

Road 31 is a road in north-west Iran in Ardabil Province. It connects Parsabad in north of province to Khalkhal. There is a project to extend the road through Alborz Mountain Range to Manjil in Gilan Province, expected to be done on 2020.
