= Tabriz–Urmia Freeway =

Road in Iran

Freeway 16
- 16 آزادراه
- Tabriz–Urmia Freeway آزادراه تبریز-ارومیه
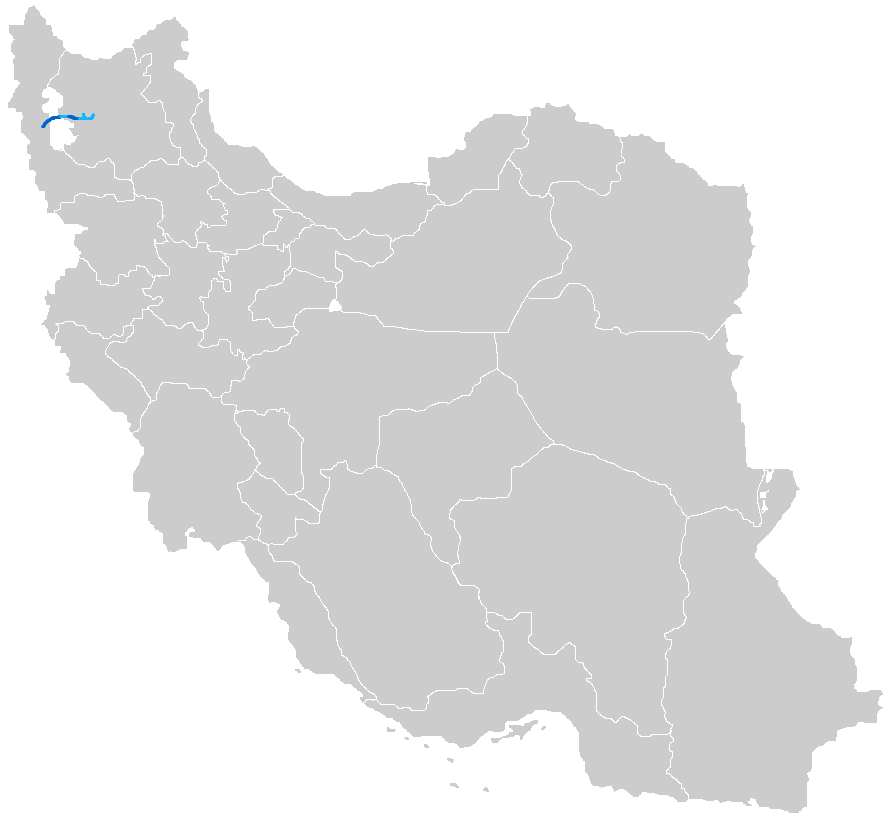

Tabriz–Urmia
- Length: 118 km (73 mi)
- From: Urmia, West Azerbaijan; Khatam ol-Anbia Expressway; Abuzr Street
- Major intersections: Road 21 near Khaseban, East Azerbaijan
- To: Near Sahand, East Azerbaijan; Tabriz–Sahand Freeway

Tabriz–Sahand Freeway
- Length: 19 km (12 mi)
- From: Sahand Phase 3, East Azerbaijan
- Major intersections: Tabriz–Urmia Freeway towards Urmia; Tashayyo' Blvd., Shahrak-e Andisheh
- To: Tabriz, East Azerbaijan; Tabriz Southern Bypass Freeway

Tabriz Second Southern Bypass Freeway
- Length: 30 km (19 mi)
- From: Tabriz, East Azerbaijan; Tabriz Western and Southern Bypass Freeway
- Major intersections: Tabriz–Sahand Freeway; Tabriz–Zanjan Freeway
- To: Near Basmenj, East Azerbaijan; Tabriz–Tehran Exp'way - Tabriz–Ahar Exp'way

Location
- Country: Iran
- Provinces: East Azerbaijan, West Azerbaijan
- Major cities: Urmia, West Azerbaijan; Osku, East Azerbaijan; Sahand, East Azerbaijan; Tabriz, East Azerbaijan; Basmenj, East Azerbaijan

Highway system
- Highways in Iran; Freeways

Tabriz–Urmia Freeway (Persian: آزادراه تبریز-ارومیه) is a partially built freeway project in Northwestern Iran, East Azerbaijan and West Azerbaijan provinces, connecting the two cities of Tabriz and Urmia. It serves as a major link, with the bridge over Urmia Lake, connecting Urmia to the rest of the country via Tabriz and Freeway 2. The project consists of several segments.

Segment 1 connects the city of Urmia to the western shore of Urmia Lake. Segment 2 is the causeway and bridge over the lake. These two segment opened to traffic on 2017. Segment 3 is a segment through the mountainous Islami Island. This segment consists of a 2 km long twin tunnel, and is currently under construction. Segment 4 runs from the start of the swampy territory to the east of Islami Island, running mostly on an embankment, towards Tabriz–Maragheh Expressway. This segment opened to traffic in August 2019. Segment 5 connects the end of Segment 4 at Khaseban to Sahand, connecting to the Tabriz–Sahand Freeway Segment.

Tabriz–Sahand Freeway segment started several years before the finalization of the plans on how the end of Segment 4 will connect to the city of Tabriz, and initially it was not supposed to be part of the Freeway, as the freeway was planned to run on the west of the existing Tabriz–Maragheh Expressway to Tabriz Western Bypass Freeway. However, now this segment will constitute the last stretch of Freeway connecting the two cities.

Segment 6, also functioning as Tabriz Second Southern Bypass Freeway, planned to take over the function of Tabriz Southern Bypass Freeway will run from west to east. Its construction started on the Summer of 2019. It will also serve as a connector from Urmia towards Tehran, bypassing the city of Tabriz

== Tabriz–Urmia Freeway ==
From West to East
Road 16; East to Naqadeh-Mahabad-Miandoab; West to Urmia Shahid Bakeri International Airport-Salmas-Khoy
Urmia
Qahremanluy-e Olya; Urmia Industrial City Urmia Cargo Terminal
Urmia Red Crescent Helicopter Base
Urmia Rural Beltway; East to Urmia; West to Salmas
Flamingo Service Station
Urmia Lake
Urmia Toll Station
West Azerbaijan Province; East Azerbaijan Province
Urmia Lake
Under Construction
Road 16
Under Construction
Road 16; Saray Deh
Khvor Khvor
Tabriz Darpad Industrial Company
Road 21; Road 16; North to Ilkhchi-Sardrud-Tabriz; South to Azarshahr-Ajab Shir
Under Construction
From East to West

== Tabriz–Sahand Freeway ==
From South to North
Bakeri Square	East to Tabriz-Tehran; West to City Center-Urmia
Sahand
	Tabriz-Urmia Freeway; Towards Esfanjan-Urmia
Sahand Toll Station
	Karjan Road; East to Karjan; West to Tabriz- East Azerbaijan Province Science and Technology Park
	Tashayo Boulevard
Tabriz Toll Station
Tabriz
	Sahandiyeh Boulevard Tabriz Southern Bypass Freeway; East to Zanjan-Tehran; West to Marand-Bazargan
From North to South

== Tabriz Second Southern Bypass Freeway ==
From West to East
From East to West
