= Road 32 (Iran) =

Road in Iran

Road 32
- جاده 32
- Road 32 (Iran).jpg
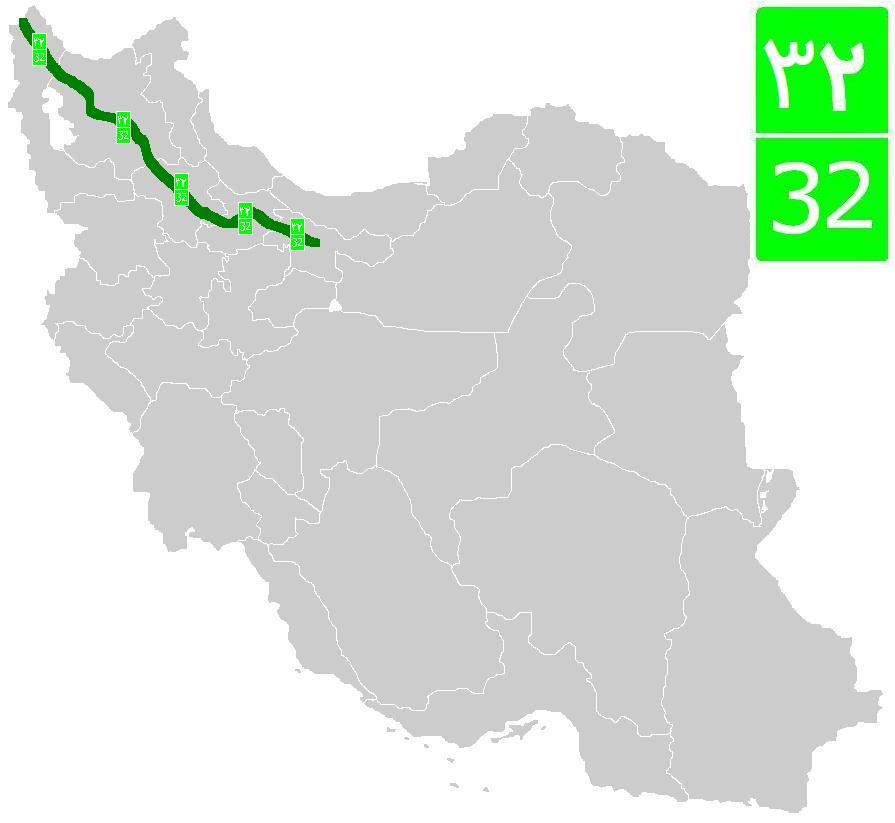

Route information
- Part of AH1
- Length: 880 km (550 mi)

Major junctions
- From: Tehran, Tehran (16) Fath Expressway
- Freeway 2 Road 59; Road 49; Road 37; Road 47; Road 35; Road 15; Road 26; Road 24; Road 16; Road 27; Pasdaran Expressway; Tabriz–Urmia Freeway; Road 21; Road 11; Road 12
- To: AH1 / E80 / D.100 at Bazargan, West Azerbaijan

Location
- Country: Iran
- Provinces: Tehran, Qazvin, Zanjan, East Azerbaijan, West Azerbaijan
- Major cities: Karaj, Tehran; Qazvin, Qazvin; Takestan, Qazvin; Zanjan, Zanjan; Tabriz, East Azerbaijan; Marand, East Azerbaijan; Maku, West Azerbaijan

Highway system
- Highways in Iran; Freeways

Road 32 (Persian: جاده ۳۲) is a road in the northwest of Iran. This road goes parallel and in line with Freeway 2 from Tehran to Karaj, Hashtgerd, Abyek, Qazvin, Takestan, Abhar, Khorramdarreh, Zanjan, Mianeh, Tabriz, Marand, Mako and finally to Bazargan and the Turkey border. This road is a part of the Asian Highway 1, which is 260 km long, and connects Tabriz to Bazargan connects Iran and Turkey border. This road passes through six provinces of Tehran, Alborz, Qazvin, Zanjan, East Azerbaijan and West Azerbaijan and is 880 km long.
