= Road 12 (Iran) =

Road in Iran

Road 12
- جاده 12

Route information
- Part of AH82
- Length: 572 km (355 mi)

Major junctions
- From: Road 32 at Bazargan
- Road 21; Road 144; Մ2 / E117 / AH82; Road 21; Road 27; Road 31
- To: Road 33 at Bileh Savar

Location
- Country: Iran
- Provinces: West Azarbaijan, East Azarbaijan, Ardabil
- Major cities: Poldasht, West Azarbaijan; Jolfa, East Azarbaijan; Parsabad, Ardabil

Highway system
- Highways in Iran; Freeways

Road 12 is a road in northern Iran south of Aras River connecting Bazargan to Poldasht, Jolfa, Parsabad and Bileh Savar. The road has strategic importance for the Republic of Azerbaijan, since it is the shortest land-based link connecting Azerbaijan-proper to Nakhjavan via Bileh Savar-Julfa section.
