= Qahremanluy =

Qahremanluy (Persian: قهرمانلوي) may refer to:

- Qahremanluy-e Olya
- Qahremanluy-e Sofla
