= Varzeshgah-e Azadi Metro Station =

Station of the Tehran Metro

Varzeshgah-e Azadi Metro Station ایستگاه مترو ورزشگاه آزادی
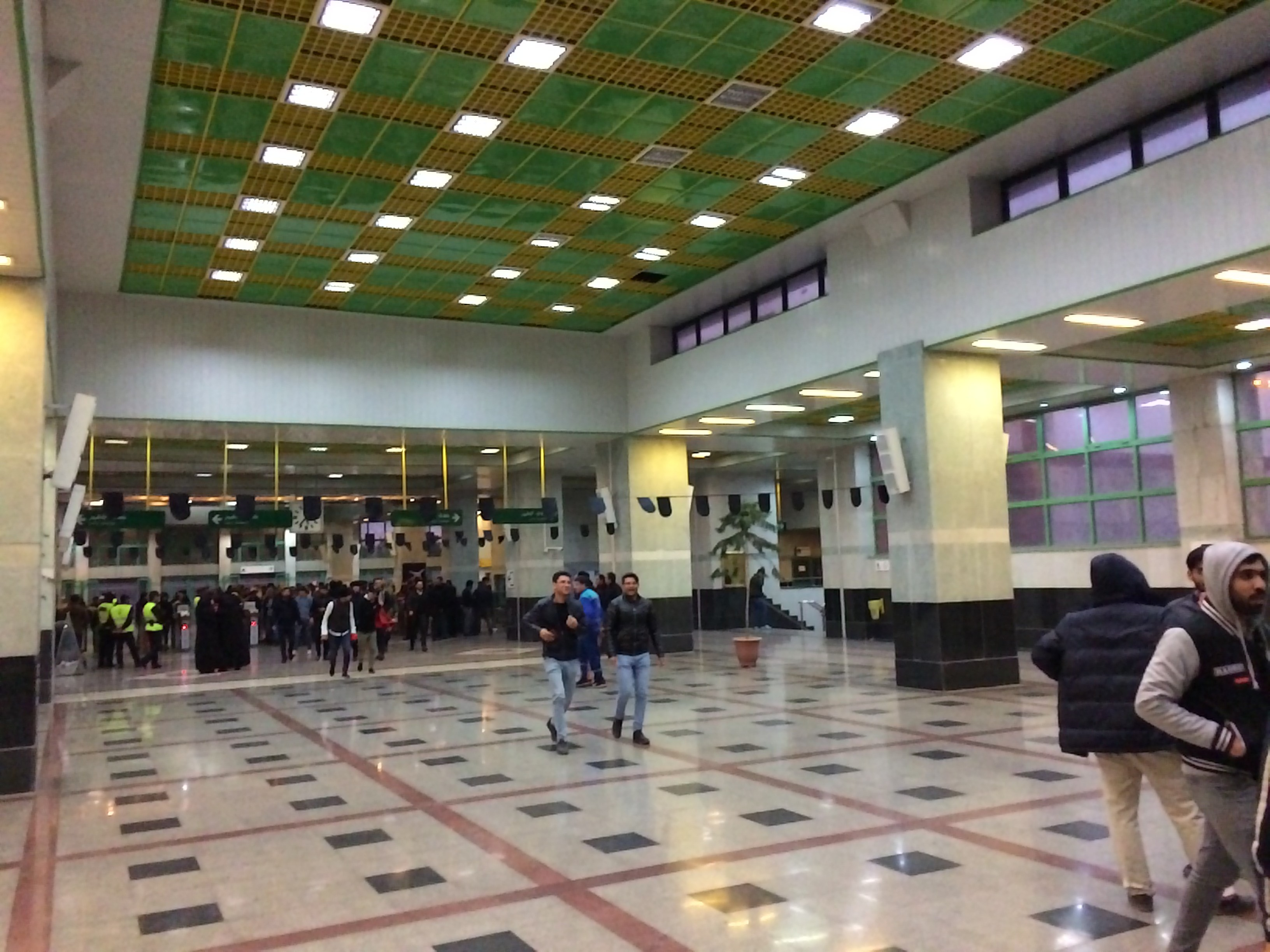

General information
- Location: Shisheh Mina Boulevard, District 22, Tehran; Tehran Province, Iran
- Coordinates: 35.7166°N 51.2815°E
- System: Tehran Metro Station
- Operator: Tehran Urban and Suburban Railways Organization (Metro)

History
- Opened: 2008

Services
Preceding station	Tehran Metro	Following station
Chitgar towards Hashtgerd	Line 5	Eram-e Sabz towards Tehran (Sadeghiyeh)
Location

Varzeshgah-e Azadi Metro Station, translated as Azadi Stadium Metro Station is a station in Tehran Metro Line 5. It is located north of Tehran-Karaj Freeway and south of Azadi Stadium. It is between Eram-e Sabz Metro Station and Chitgar Metro Station.
