= Saleh Sokhandan =

Iranian designer of optical illusions (born 1990)

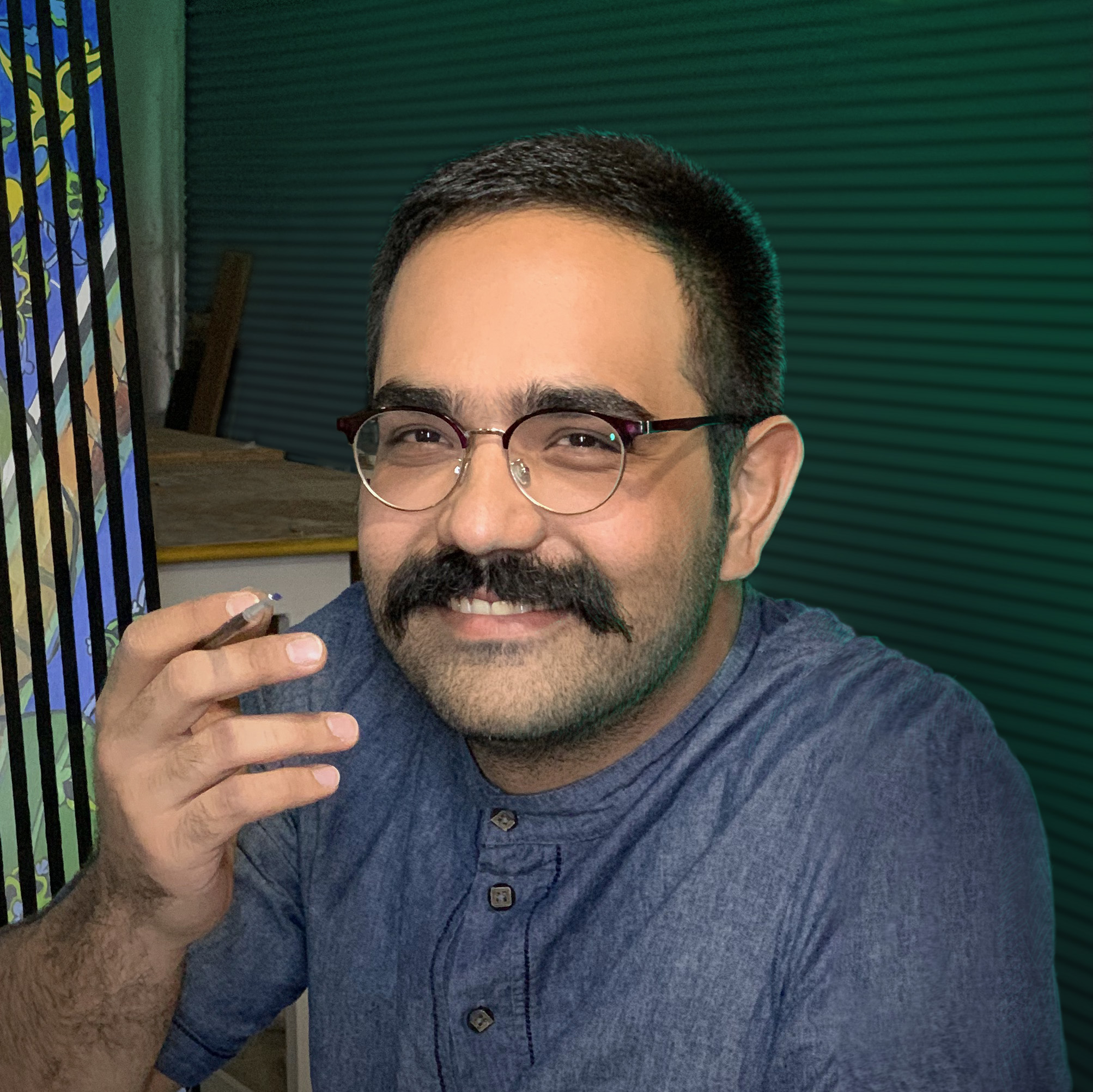
- Born: 27 October 1990 (age 35); Tehran, Iran
- Known for: Optical illusion
- Website: salso.cc

Saleh Sokhandan (Persian: صالح سخندان; Persian pronunciation: [sɒːleh soxændɒːn], born on 27 October 1990) is an Iranian designer of optical illusion.

== Life ==
Sokhandan is a student of electrical engineering at K. N. Toosi the University of Technology, who also has experience and background in graphic design. In 2011, He left university and devoted himself to developing a personal artistic style of Anamorphosis that uses optical illusions.

== Art ==
He has been studying and designing Optical illusion artifacts since 2011. His first exhibition in Optical illusion was performed as a 3-D painting, although it was not his first experience. Sokhandan has created many personal and business artwork, such as park construction, museum structure, graphic designing, and sculpturing based on Optical illusion and layout and drawing 3-D artifacts.

Sokhandan uses improvisation to conduct his first design. Due to the novelty of the field of optical illusion arts, the early works of Sokhandan did not attract public attention. Still, over time and with the publication of photos of his works on social networks, this art style received more attention than before in Iran, especially in advertising and entertainment.

In 2015, Saleh Sokhandan established an art group named Mr. Op Art, including experts in this area. They have been designing Optical illusions since 2011.

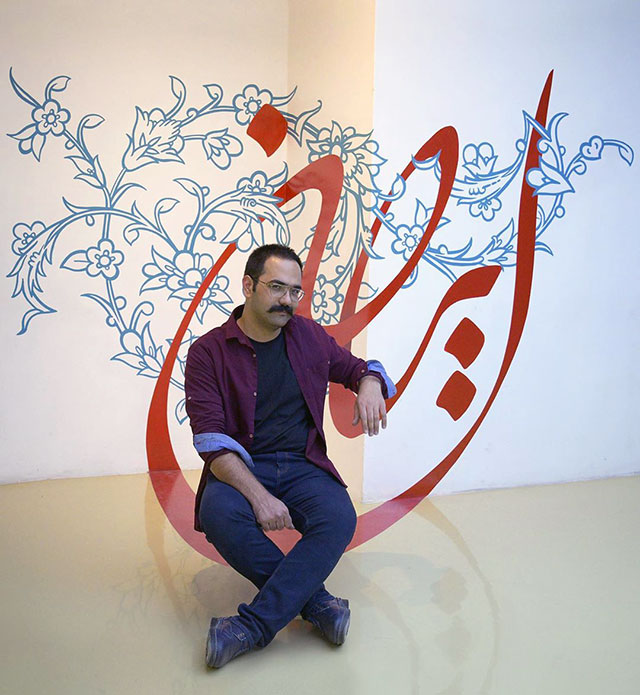
Depositing artworks in Roya Park museum, Tehran

== Artworks ==
In 2014, he designed the logo of TEDxTehran at Vahdat Hall.

In 2018, Roya Park, the first Optical illusion in Iran, was established under the observation of Sokhandan and designed by him and native experts and designers of an artistic engineering team. Some traditional Iranian signs in departments of this structure, like the magic carpet, Arash, Simurgh, and Asiatic cheetah, can lead to a feeling of being native-born for visitors.

In 2019, Saleh Sokhandan designed and implemented The Reverse House in Chitgar Park. The Reverse House was the first upside-down museum in Iran. However, there were three reverse gravity rooms beforehand in Roya Park.

== See also ==
- Anaglyph 3D
- Anamorphosis
- Op art
- Trompe-l'œil
