= Mashhad Northern Bypass Freeway =

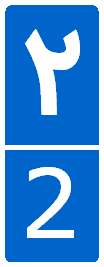
Mashhad Northern Bypass Freeway آزادراه کنارگذر شمالی مشهد
- 2 آزادراه
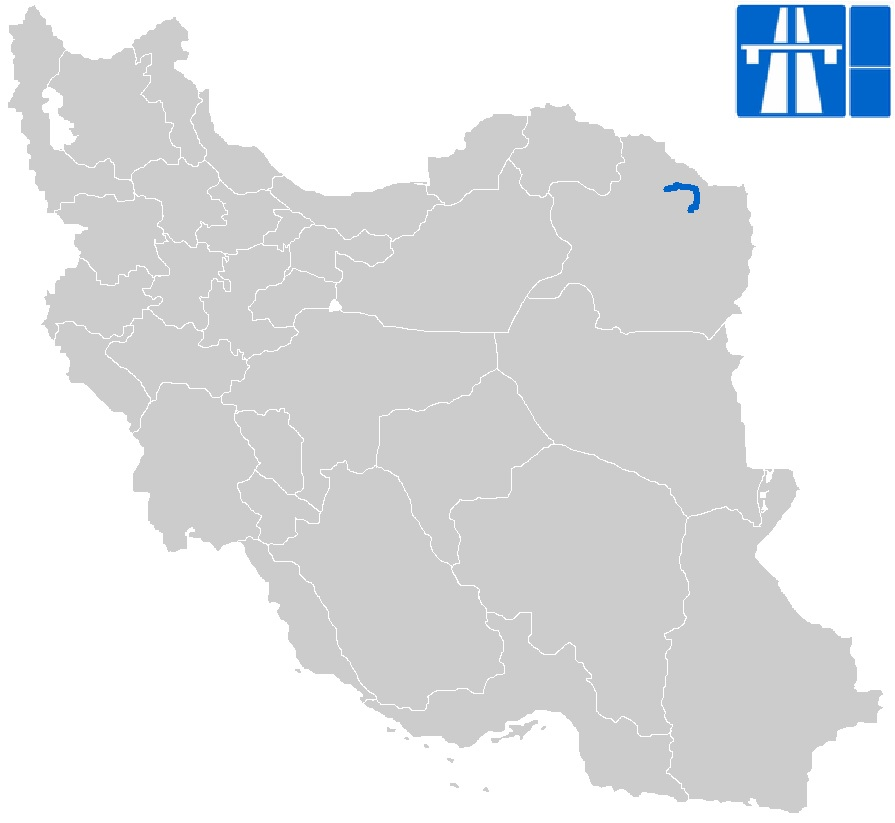

Route information
- Part of AH75
- Length: 70 km (43 mi)

Major junctions
- From: Askariyeh, Razavi Khorasan; Road 22
- Road 22; Road 97
- To: Tappeh Salam, Razavi Khorasan; Freeway 2

Location
- Country: Iran
- Provinces: Razavi Khorasan
- Major cities: Tus, Razavi Khorasan; Mashhad, Razavi Khorasan; Razaviyeh, Razavi Khorasan

Highway system
- Highways in Iran; Freeways

Mashhad Northern Bypass Freeway (Persian: آزادراه کنارگذر شمالی مشهد) is a freeway in Mashhad, Razavi Khorasan, Northeastern Iran. It was opened in fall 2012.

From West to East
Under Construction; Towards Chenaran-Quchan-Bojnord-Gorgan
Road 22; West to Golbahar-Quchan-Bojnurd-Gorgan; South to Tus-Mashhad
Toll Station
Kalat Road; North to Kalat; South to Mashhad
Toll Station
West to Razaviyeh-Mashhad; East towards Road 22
Road 22; West to Razaviyeh-Mashhad; East to Sarakhs
Toll Station
Road 97; North to Mashhad; East to Fariman-Torbat-e Jam-Tayebad
Haram ta haram Freeway; West to Baghcheh-Neyshabur-Tehran; East to Mashhad
From East to West
