= Vardavard Metro Station =

Station of the Tehran Metro

Vardavard Metro Station ایستگاه مترو وردآورد

General information
- Location: Shahrak-e Daneshgah-e Sharif, District 22, Tehran; Tehran Province, Iran
- Coordinates: 35.7440°N 51.1507°E
- System: Tehran Metro Station
- Operator: Tehran Urban and Suburban Railways Organization (Metro)
- Connections: Tehran Buses: 231 Vardavard Metro-Shahrak-e Daneshgah-e Sharif; 394 Vardavard Metro-Shahrak-e Vardavard

History
- Opened: 1999

Services
Preceding station	Tehran Metro	Following station
Garmdarreh towards Hashtgerd	Line 5	Iran Khodro towards Tehran (Sadeghiyeh)
Location

Vardavard Metro Station is a station in Tehran Metro Line 5. It is located north of Tehran-Karaj Freeway. It is between Iran Khodro Metro Station and Garmdare Metro Station.
