= Road 23 (Iran) =

Road in Iran

Road 23
- جاده 23

Route information
- Length: 390 km (240 mi)

Major junctions
- From: Miandoab, West Azarbaijan; Road 21
- Road 35
- To: Hamadan, Hamadan; Najafi Boulevard

Location
- Country: Iran
- Provinces: West Azarbaijan, Kordestan, Hamadan
- Major cities: Shahindej, West Azarbaijan; Takab, West Azarbaijan; Bijar, Kordestan; Bahar, Hamadan

Highway system
- Highways in Iran; Freeways

Road 23 is a road in western Iran. It connects Miandoab to Bijar and Hamadan. The southern part is considered important and touristic. The road connects Hamadan to Alisadr Cave. The length between Hamadan to Alisadr Cave is 60 km.
