= AH75 =

Road in Iran and Turkmenistan

Asian Highway 75

Route information
- Length: 1,920 km (1,190 mi)

Major junctions
- North end: Tejen, Turkmenistan
- South end: Chabahar, Iran

Location
- Countries: Turkmenistan; Iran

Highway system
- Asian Highway Network
← AH72	→ AH76

Asian Highway 75 (AH75) is a road in the Asian Highway Network running 1920 km (1190 miles) from Tejen, Turkmenistan to Chabahar, Iran. The route is as follows:

== Turkmenistan ==
- P-7 (Gaudan Highway) Tejen - Serakhs

== Iran ==
- Road 22: Sarakhs - Mashhad
- Mashhad Northern Bypass Freeway
- Freeway 2: Mashhad - Baghcheh
- Road 95: Baghcheh - Birjand - Nehbandan - Dashtak - Zahedan - Chabahar
