= Chitgar Metro Station =

Station of the Tehran Metro

Chitgar Metro Station ایستگاه مترو چیتگر
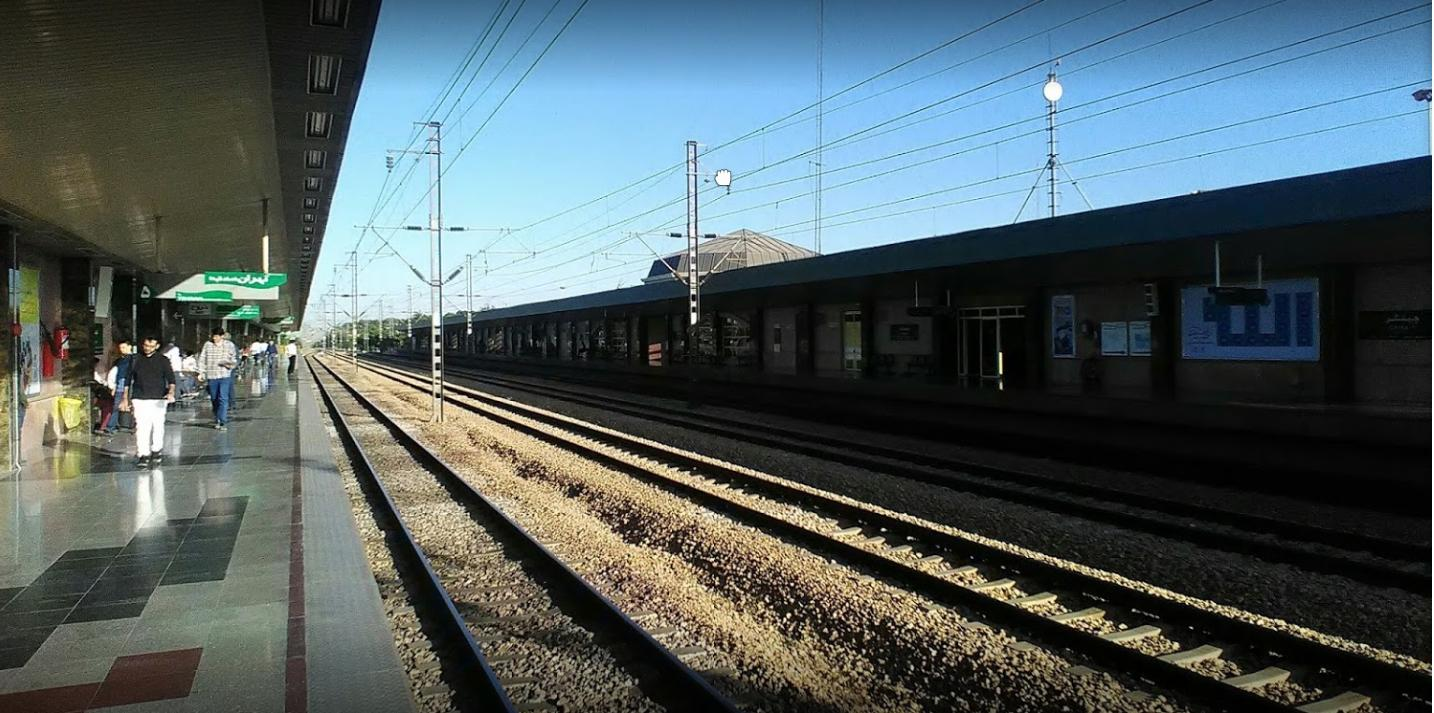

General information
- Location: Kuhak Boulevard, District 22, Tehran; Tehran Province, Iran
- Coordinates: 35.7171°N 51.2439°E
- System: Tehran Metro Station
- Operator: Tehran Urban and Suburban Railways Organization (Metro)
- Connections: Tehran Buses: 251 Chitgar Metro-Shahrak-e Daneshgah; 325 Chitgar Metro-Shahrak-e Baqeri; 326 Chitgar Metro-Hemmat-Shari'ati; 327 Chitgar Metro-Jozani St.

History
- Opened: 2005

Services
Preceding station	Tehran Metro	Following station
Iran Khodro towards Hashtgerd	Line 5	Varzeshgah-e Azadi towards Tehran (Sadeghiyeh)
Location

Chitgar Metro Station is a station in Tehran Metro Line 5. It is located north of Tehran-Karaj Freeway and near Chitgar Park. It is between Azadi Stadium Metro Station and Iran Khodro Metro Station.
