= Fath Expressway =

Expressway in Tehran, Iran

Motevaselian Expressway

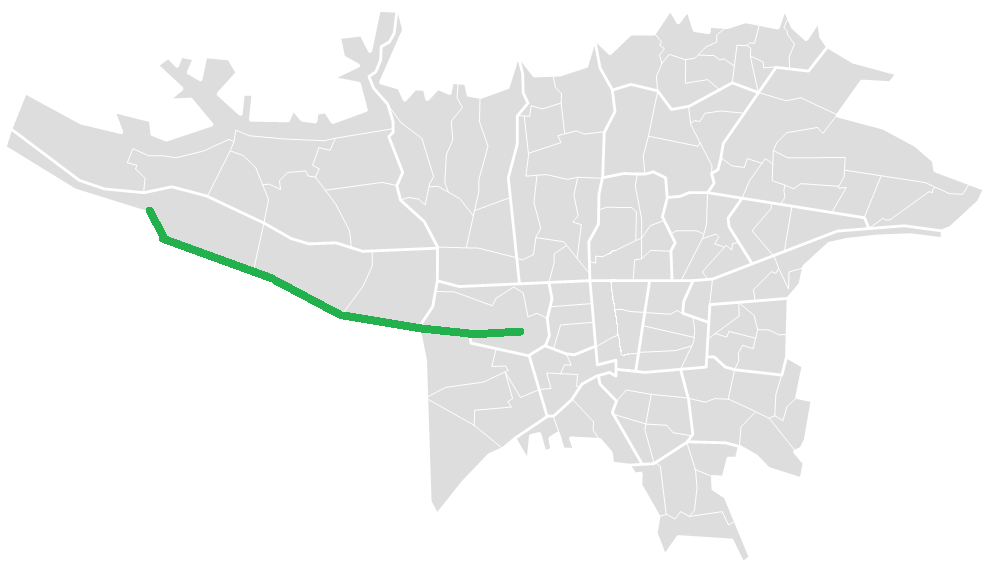

Route information
- Length: 21.1 km (13.1 mi)

Major junctions
- East end: Fath Square
- West end: Makhsus Expressway

Location
- Country: Iran
- Major cities: Tehran, Shahr-e Qods

Highway system
- Highways in Iran; Freeways

Motevaselian Expressway is an expressway located in West Tehran starting at Fath Square and joining Road 32 at the end.

From East to West
Fath Square	Saidi Expressway
U-Turn
	45 metri Zarand Boulevard
U-Turn
	Golha Boulevard
	Azadegan Expressway
	Shahriar Expressway
	Iran Khodro Boulevard
	Andisheh Expressway
Tehran; Shahr-e Qods
	Enqelab Boulevard
	Mkhsus Karaj Expressway
From West to East
