= Iran Khodro Metro Station =

Station of the Tehran Metro

Iran Khodro Metro Station ایستگاه مترو ایران خودرو Aystegah-e Mitru-ye Iran Xudru

General information
- Location: Peykanshahr, District 22, Tehran; Tehran Province, Iran
- Coordinates: 35.7253°N 51.1966°E
- System: Tehran Metro Station
- Operator: Tehran Urban and Suburban Railways Organization (Metro)
- Connections: Tehran Buses: 249 Iran Khodro Metro-Shahrak-e Shahrdari; 329 Iran Khodro Metro-Shahrak-e Baqeri

History
- Opened: 2005

Services
Preceding station	Tehran Metro	Following station
Vardavard towards Hashtgerd	Line 5	Chitgar towards Tehran (Sadeghiyeh)
Location

Iran Khodro Metro Station is a station in Tehran Metro Line 5. It is located north of Tehran-Karaj Freeway and near Iran Khodro factory. It is between Chitgar Metro Station and Vardavard Metro Station.
