= Freeway 1 (Iran) =

Freeway 1
- 1 آزادراه
- Qazvin-Rasht Freeway

Route information
- Part of AH8
- Length: 138 km (86 mi) 11 km (7 mi) of which is still under construction

Major junctions
- From: Qazvin, Qazvin; Freeway 2
- Road 49
- To: Emamzadeh Hashem, Gilan; Road 49

Location
- Country: Iran
- Provinces: Qazvin, Gilan
- Major cities: Manjil, Gilan; Rudbar, Gilan

Highway system
- Highways in Iran; Freeways

Freeway 1 (Persian: آزادراه ۱) is a freeway in northern Iran, connecting the city of Qazvin to Rasht within Gilan Province.

This freeway is part of the Iranian North-South Corridor system.

It starts from Freeway 2, crosses through the Alborz mountain range, and ends near Rasht. It runs along Road 49.

== Route ==
From North to South
Continues as: Road 49; North to Rasht
Emamzadeh Hashem; Road 49; South to Rostamabad-Qazvin
Emamzadeh Hashem Toll Station
Rostamabad; Tutkabon
Road 49; Rudbar
Manjil; Road 49; North to Rostamabad-Rasht; South to Loshan-Qazvin
Loshan; Road 49
Gilan Province; Qazvin Province
Road 49; North to Lowshan-Rasht; South to Qazvin
Qazvin Toll Station
Qazvin-Zanjan Freeway; East to Karaj-Tehran; West to Takestan-Zanjan-Tabriz
From South to North

Source: data from openstreetmap contributions
