= Road 46 (Iran) =

Road in Iran

Road 46
- جاده 46

Route information
- Length: 300 km (190 mi)

Major junctions
- From: Near Hamadan, Hamadan; Road 48
- Road 35; Road 21; Road 15
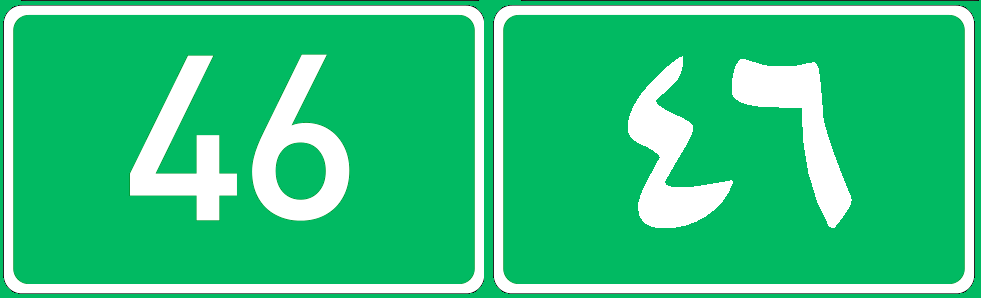
- To: Bashmaq, Marivan, Kurdistan; Iraq Road 46 (Iraq)

Location
- Country: Iran
- Provinces: Hamadan, Kurdistan
- Major cities: Qorveh, Kurdistan Province; Sanandaj, Kurdestan; Marivan, Kurdistan

Highway system
- Highways in Iran; Freeways

Road 46 is a road across the Zagros Mountains, located in Hamadan Province and Kurdistan Province of western Iran.

== Route ==
It connects Hamadan to Sanandaj and Marivan in Kurdistan Province.

This road is part of Tehran-Sanandaj Road system.

== See also ==
- Zagros Mountains topics
