= Road 24 (Iran) =

Road in Iran

Road 24
- جاده 24

Route information
- Length: 142 km (88 mi)

Major junctions
- From: Near Hashtrud, East Azarbaijan; Road 32
- Freeway 2
- To: Bonab, East Azarbaijan; Road 21

Location
- Country: Iran
- Provinces: East Azarbaijan
- Major cities: Hashtrud, East Azarbaijan; Maraqeh, East Azarbaijan; Bonab, East Azarbaijan

Highway system
- Highways in Iran; Freeways

Road 24 is a road within East Azerbaijan Province, in the Iranian Kurdistan region of northwestern Iran. It connects the town of Hashtrud to Maraqeh and Bonab.

== See also ==
- Transportation in East Azerbaijan Province
