= Road 11 (Iran) =

Road in Iran

- جاده 11

Route information
- Part of AH82
- Length: 525 km (326 mi)

Major junctions
- From: Jolfa, East Azerbaijan; Road 12
- Road 32; Road 16; Road 26; Road 21
- To: Near Baneh, Kordestan; Iraq Border Check

Location
- Country: Iran
- Provinces: East Azerbaijan, West Azerbaijan, Kordestan
- Major cities: Khoy, West Azerbaijan; Salmas, West Azerbaijan; Urmia, West Azerbaijan; Mahabad, West Azerbaijan; Sardasht, West Azerbaijan; Baneh, Kordestan

Highway system
- Highways in Iran; Freeways

Road 11 is a road in northwestern Iran. It connects the city of Jolfa near the border with Azerbaijan to the cities of Urmia, Mahabad, Sardasht, Baneh. It ends to the south of Baneh when it finally meets the Iraq border. It has a total length of 525 kilometres (326 mi).
