= Road 26 (Iran) =

Road in Iran

Road 26
- جاده 26

Route information
- Length: 365 km (227 mi)

Major junctions
- From: Mianeh, East Azarbaijan; Road 32
- Freeway 2 Road 21; Road 213; Road 11
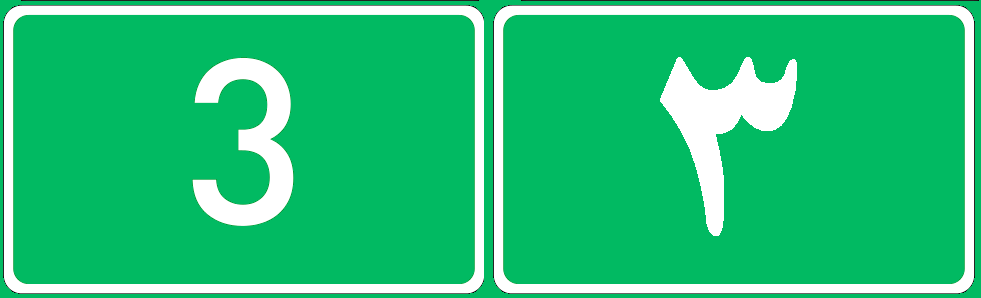
- To: Near Piranshahr, West Azarbaijan; Iraq Highway 3 (Iraq)

Location
- Country: Iran
- Provinces: West Azarbaijan
- Major cities: Mahabad, West Azarbaijan; Piranshahr, West Azarbaijan

Highway system
- Highways in Iran; Freeways

Road 26 is a road in north-western Iran connecting Mianeh to Miandoab, Mahabad and Piranshahr Border with Iraqi Kurdistan.
