= Road 49 (Iran) =

Road in Iran

Road 49
- جاده 49

Route information
- Part of AH8
- Length: 495 km (308 mi)

Major junctions
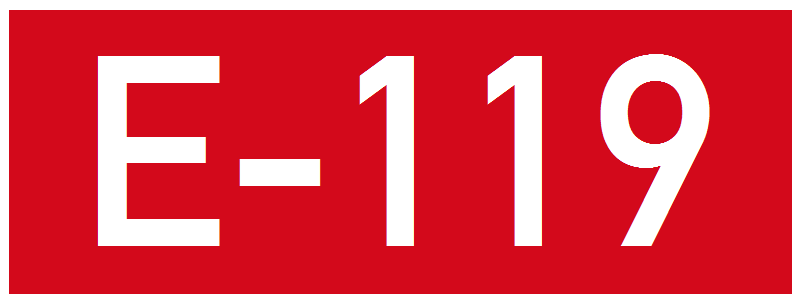
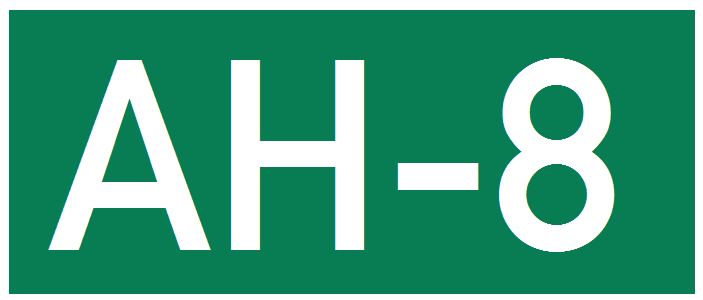
- From: M 3 / E119 / AH8 at Astara at Azerbaijani border
- Road 16; Road 315; Road 22; Road 222; Road 494; Road 22; Road 497; Freeway 1; Freeway 2; Road 32; Road 38
- To: Road 65 at Saveh

Location
- Country: Iran
- Provinces: Markazi, Qazvin, Gilan
- Major cities: Buin Zahra, Qazvin, Manjil, Rasht, Bandar Anzali, Rezvanshahr

Highway system
- Highways in Iran; Freeways

Road 49 is the road connecting the Azerbaijan border from Astara to Qazvin and Tehran; and from Saveh to Road 65.

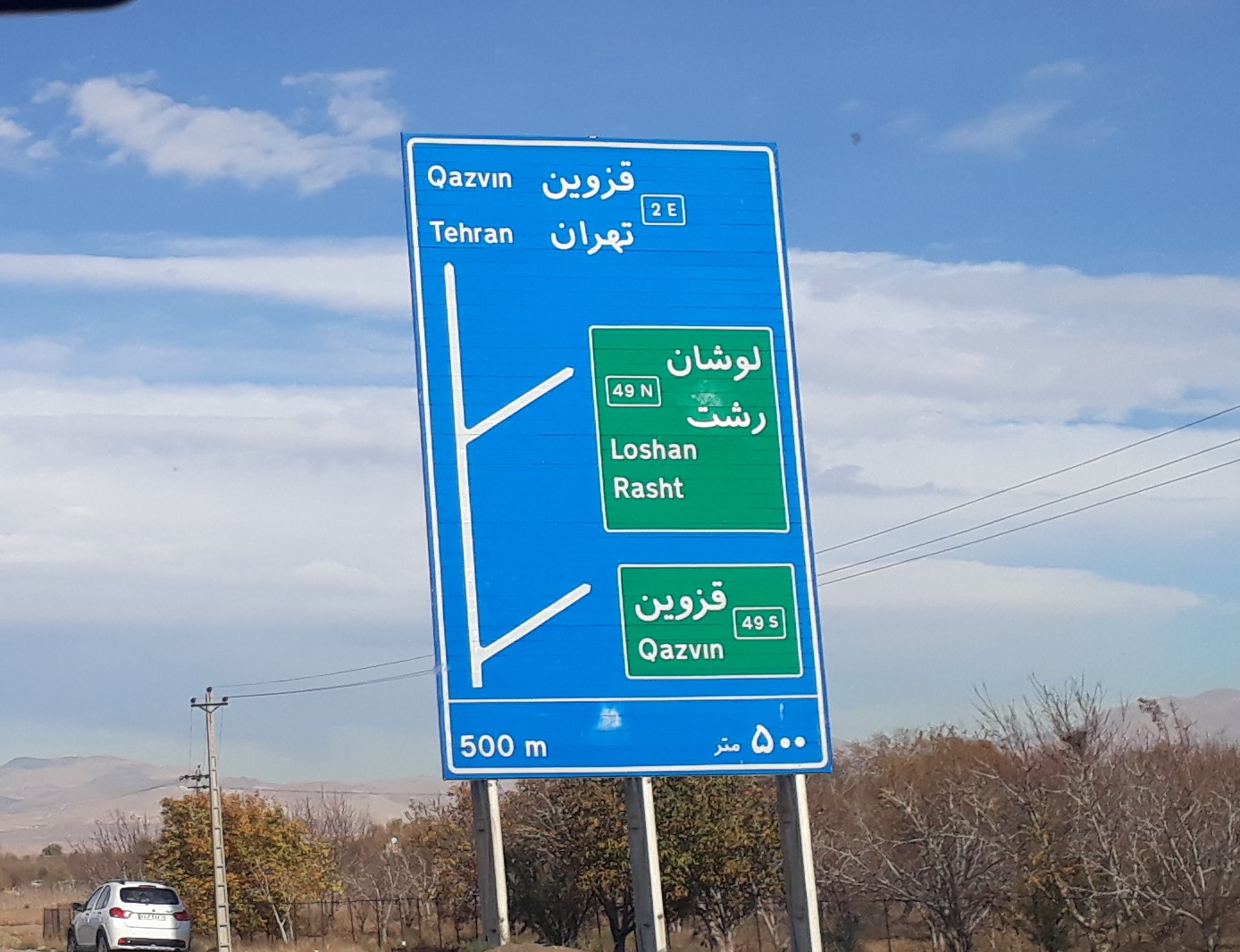
Intersection of Freeway 2 and Road 49 in Qazvin

It crosses the western Alborz mountain range.

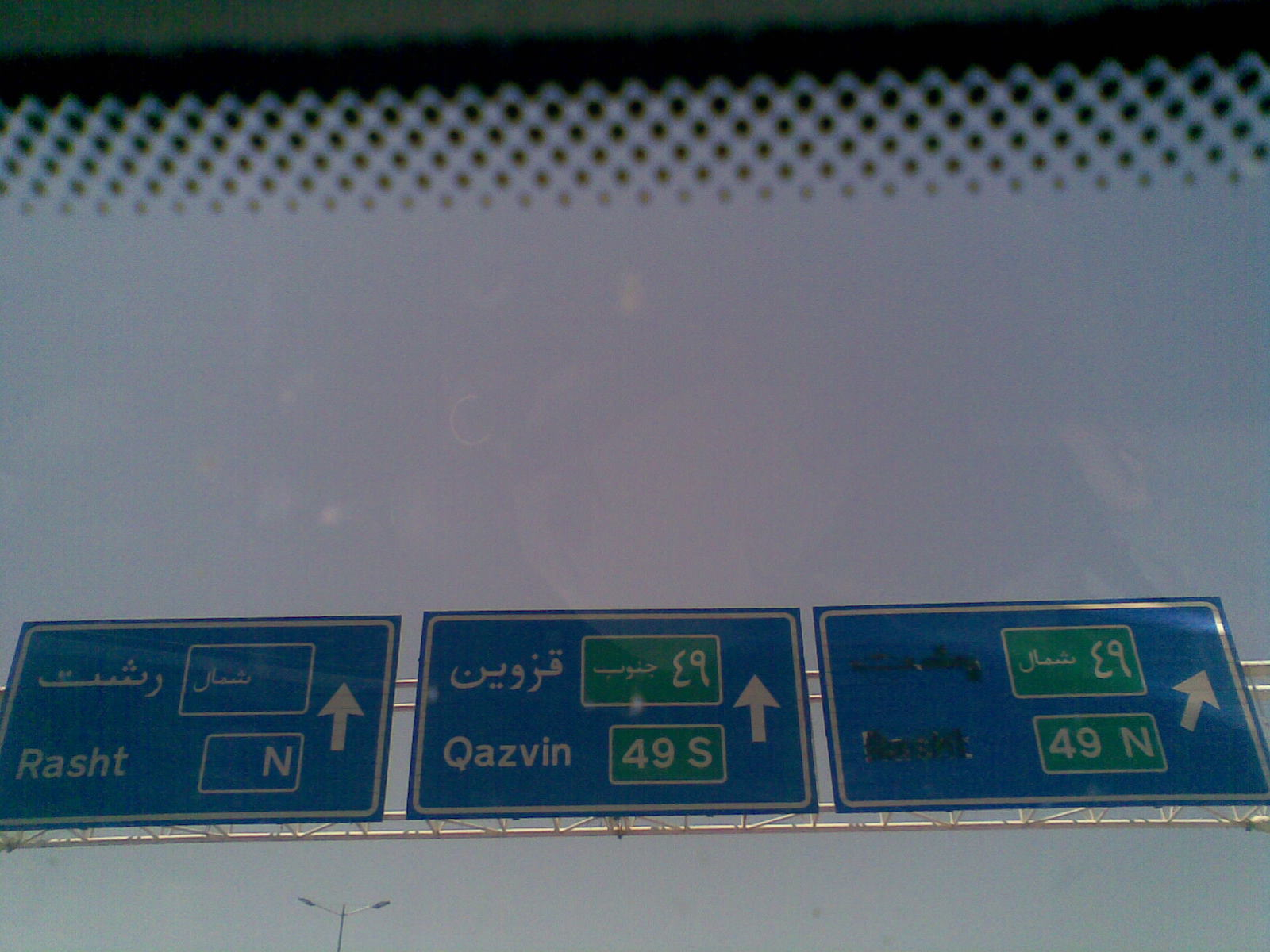
