= Road 14 (Iran) =

Road in Iran

Road 14
- جاده 14

Route information
- Length: 460 km (290 mi) 70 km (43 mi) in common with Road 27 from Ahar to Road 32

Major junctions
- From: Near Razi, Ardabil; Road 33
- Road 276; Road 27; Road 144; Road 145; Tabriz Northern Freeway; Babayi Expressway; Road 21; Road 32
- To: Salmas, West Azarbaijan; Road 11

Location
- Country: Iran
- Provinces: Ardabil, East Azarbaijan, West Azarbaijan
- Major cities: Meshkin Shahr, Ardabil; Ahar, East Azarbaijan; Tabriz, East Azarbaijan; Shabestar, East Azarbaijan

Highway system
- Highways in Iran; Freeways

Road 14 is a road in Iranian Azerbaijan connecting Ardabil to Ahar, Tabriz, Shabestar and Salmas. Part of the road 14 paths from North of Tabriz where it merges into Pasdaran Highway.
