= Road 15 (Iran) =

Road in Iran

Road 15
- جاده 15
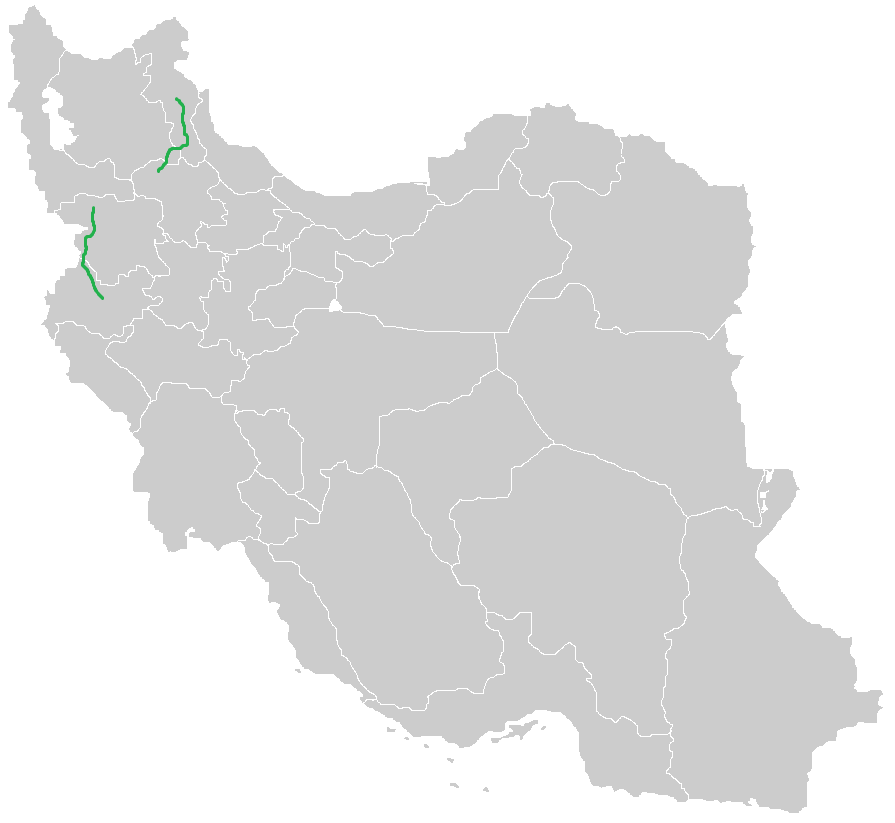

Northern Segment Ardabil - Sarcham
- Length: 176 km (109 mi)
- From: Ardabil, Ardabil
- Major intersections: Road 31; Road 32
- To: Sarcham-e Sofla, Zanjan; Zanjan - Tabriz Freeway

Southern Segment
- Length: 375 km (233 mi)
- From: Saqez, Kordestan; Road 21
- Major intersections: Road 46
- To: Near Kermanshah, Kermanshah; Road 21

Location
- Country: Iran
- Provinces: Ardabil, East Azerbaijan, Zanjan, Kordestan, Kermanshah,
- Major cities: Ardabil, Ardabil; Kivi, Ardabil; Aqkand, East Azerbaijan; Saqez, Kordestan; Marivan, Kordestan; Paveh, Kermanshah; Ravansar, Kermanshah

Highway system
- Highways in Iran; Freeways

Road 15 is two segments of roadways in Western Iran. The northern segment opened in the year 2011. This road connects the city of Ardabil to Tehran - Tabriz Freeway, thus providing a direct connection from Ardabil to Tehran and beyond.

The southern segment is a road in Iranian Kurdistan connecting Kermanshah to Paveh, Marivan and Saqez. Some parts of the Marivan-Saqez road are currently unpaved. The infrastructure of the road is currently being updated, with landscaping and paving projects underway.

== See also ==
- Road sign marking Highway number 15 North towards Khalkhal and Ardabil on Zanjan - Tabriz Freeway: Link
