= Road 97 (Iran) =

Road in Iran

Road 97
- جاده 97

Route information
- Part of AH1
- Length: 200 km (120 mi)

Major junctions
- From: Mashhad, Khorasan Razavi; Freeway 2- Road 44
- Mashhad Northern Bypass Freeway; Freeway 2
- To: Taybad, Khorasan Razavi; Road 36

Location
- Country: Iran
- Provinces: Khorasan Razavi
- Major cities: Fariman, Khorasan Razavi; Torbat-e Jam, Khorasan Razavi

Highway system
- Highways in Iran; Freeways

Road 97 is a road in eastern Iran connecting Mashhad to Taybad. This road is very important because it connects Afghanistan to Mashhad and Tehran Road. All parts of this road is part of AH1.
