= Road 35 (Iran) =

Road in Iran

Road 35
- جاده 35

Route information
- Length: 795 km (494 mi)

Major junctions
- From: Zanjan, Zanjan Province; Road 32
- Freeway 2 Road 23; Road 46; Road 48
- To: Khorramabad, Lorestan; Road 37

Location
- Country: Iran
- Provinces: Zanjan, Kordestan, Kermanshah, Lorestan
- Major cities: Bijar, Kordestan; Qorveh, Kordestan; Sonqor, Kermanshah; Nurabad, Lorestan

Highway system
- Highways in Iran; Freeways

Road 35 is a road in Iran connecting Zanjan to Khorramabad. The important part is the southern part connecting Khorramabad to Kermanshah.

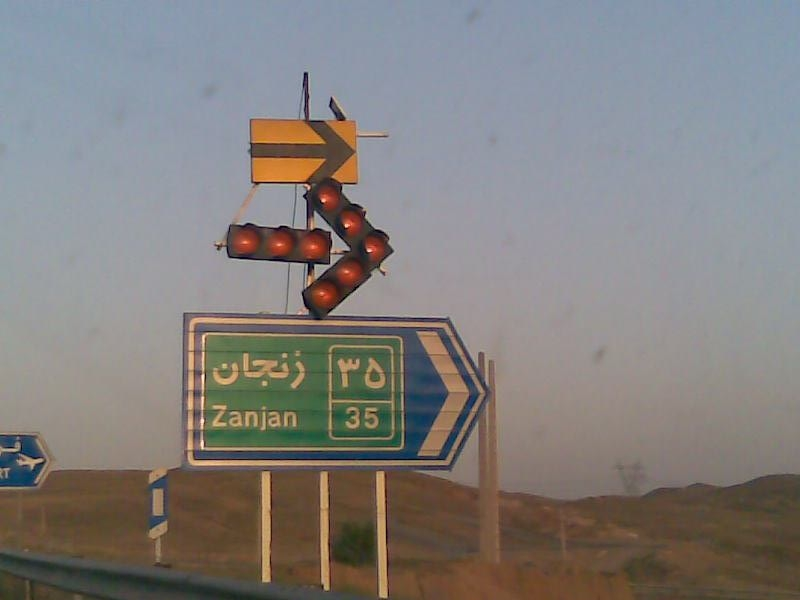

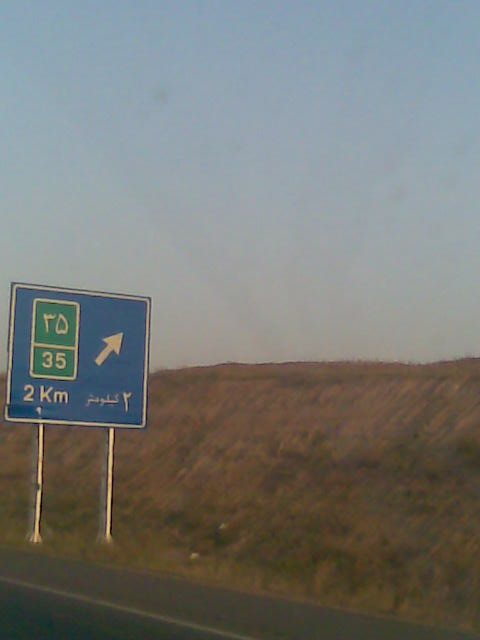
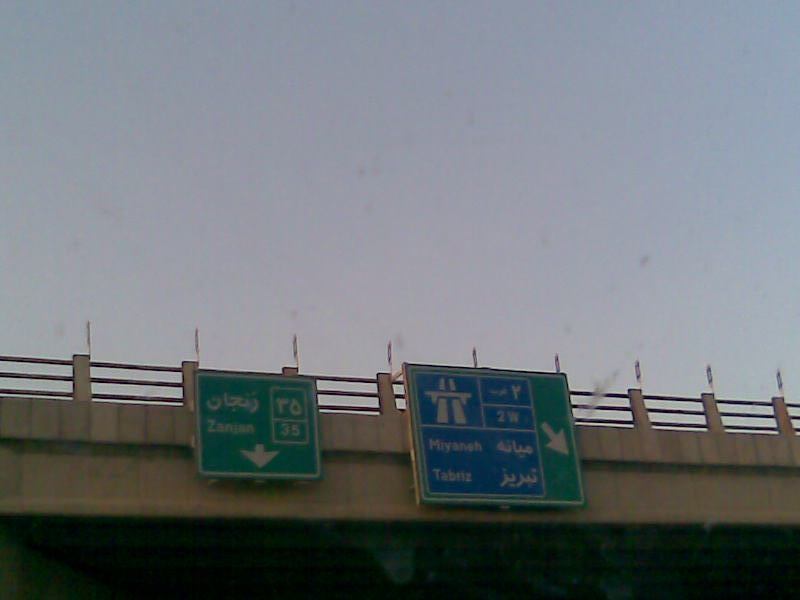

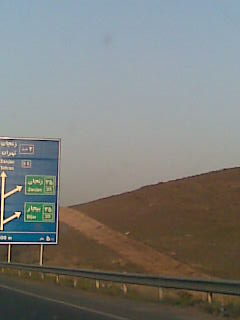

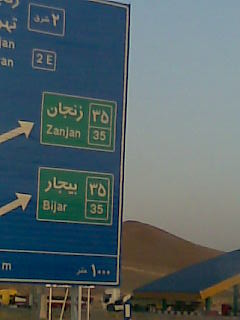
