= Buein Zahra Technical University =

Coordinates: 35.7548°N 50.0607°E

- Established: 2012; 14 years ago
- Website: www.bzte.ac.ir

Buein Zahra Technical University (BZTU) is an Iranian public university focused on technological and engineering courses, and located in Buin Zahra, Qazvin province, Iran. This university was founded in 2012, with 45 students enrolled in two bachelor's programs.now has two faculties covering five technical groups, with 2270 students in 17 engineering courses.
