= Road 27 (Iran) =

Road in Iran

Road 27
- جاده 27

Route information
- Length: 245 km (152 mi)

Major junctions
- From: Khomarlu, East Azarbaijan; Road 12
- Road 274; Road 14; Road 165; Road 145
- To: Tabriz, East Azarbaijan; Road 32

Location
- Country: Iran
- Provinces: East Azarbaijan
- Major cities: Kalibar, East Azarbaijan; Ahar, East Azarbaijan

Highway system
- Highways in Iran; Freeways

Road 27 is a road in East Azarbaijan, Iran connecting Tabriz to Ahar and northern province to Khomarlu.
