= Highway 3 (Iraq) =

Road in Iraq

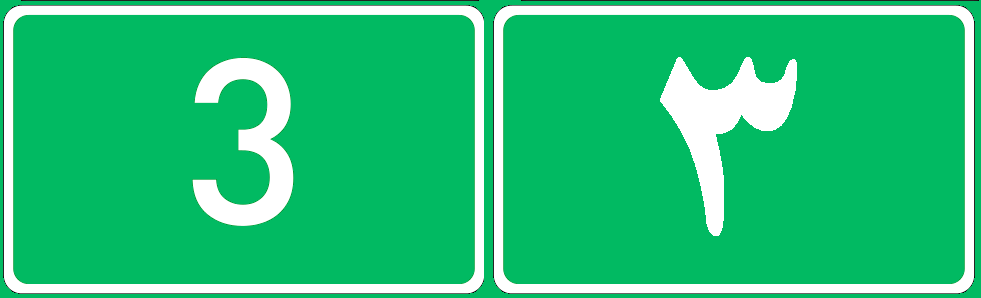
Highway 3
- ٣ طريق رقم

Route information
- Part of

Major junctions
- From: Baghdad
- To: Haj Omran; Road 26

Location
- Country: Iraq

Highway system
- Highways in Iraq

Highway 3 is an Iraqi highway which extends from Baghdad to Baqubah, and then it begins again from Irbil to Haji Umran Border Crossing to Iran, where it connects to Iranian Road 26.
