= Bileh Savar =

City in Ardabil province, Iran

Bileh Savar Persian: بیله سوار
- City
- Location within Iran
- Coordinates: 39°22′46″N 48°21′15″E
- Country: Iran
- Province: Ardabil
- County: Bileh Savar
- District: Central

Population (2016)
  - Total: 16,188
- Time zone: UTC+3:30 (IRST)

Bileh Savar (Persian: بیله سوار) (Note: Also romanized as Bīleh Savār; also known as Bilesuvar) is a city in the Central District of Bileh Savar County, Ardabil province, Iran, serving as capital of both the county and the district.

The city is the site of a border crossing with Republic of Azerbaijan. Bileh Savar was built by a dignitary of the Buyid dynasty who was called Pile-Savar ("The Great Rider"). Road 33 connects the city to Ardabil, capital of the province.

The similarly named Azerbaijani city of Biləsuvar is located directly across the border.

== Demographics ==
=== Population ===
At the time of the 2006 National Census, the city's population was 14,027 in 3,251 households. The following census in 2011 counted 15,183 people in 4,033 households. The 2016 census measured the population of the city as 16,188 people in 4,837 households.
