= Shahrak-e Golestan =

Shahrak-e Golestan شهرك گلستان
- Village
- Country: Iran
- Province: Fars
- County: Shiraz
- Bakhsh: Central
- Rural District: Derak

Population (2006)
  - Total: 37,364
- Time zone: UTC+3:30 (IRST)
  - Summer (DST): UTC+4:30 (IRDT)

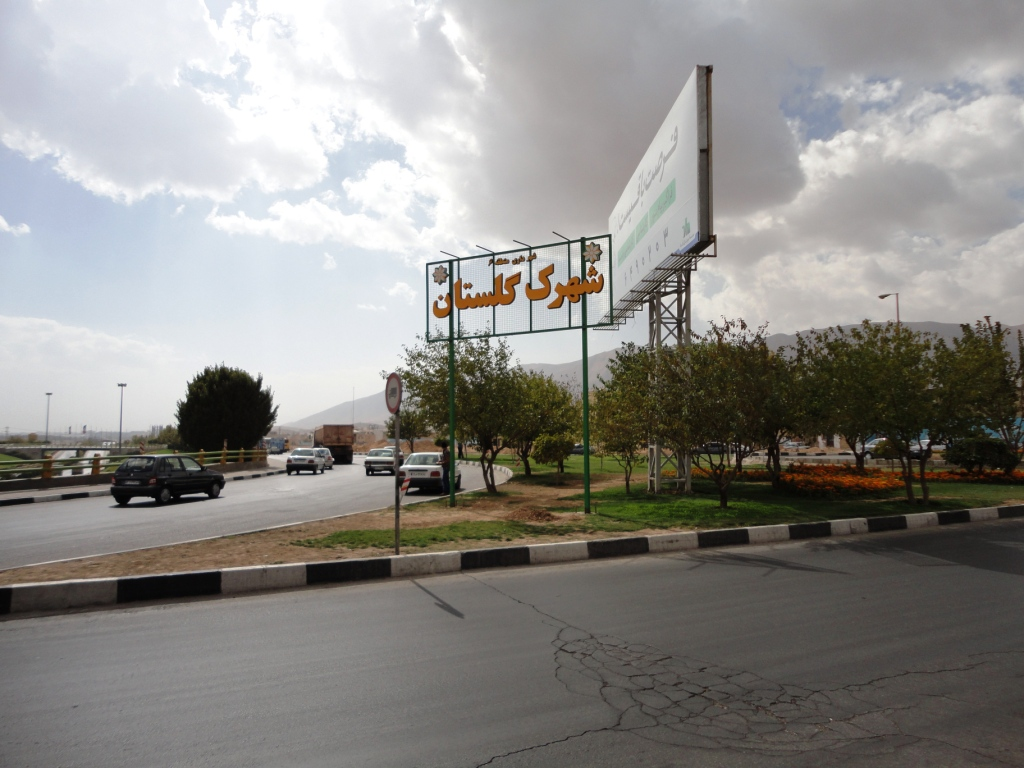
Sign of Golestan. The sign reads "Golestan Town" in Persian.

Shahrak-e Golestan (Persian: شهرك گلستان, also Romanized as Shahrak-e Golestān) is a area in Derak The Town District, in the Central District of Shiraz County, Fars province, Iran. At the 2006 census, its population was 37,364, in 9,634 families.
