= Qahremanluy-e Sofla =

Qahremanluy-e Sofla قهرمانلوی سفلی
- Village
- Location within Iran
- Coordinates: 37°39′00″N 45°10′30″E
- Country: Iran
- Province: West Azerbaijan
- County: Urmia
- Bakhsh: Central
- Rural District: Bash Qaleh

Population (2006)
  - Total: 257
- Time zone: UTC+3:30 (IRST)
  - Summer (DST): UTC+4:30 (IRDT)

Qahremanluy-e Sofla (Persian: قهرمانلوی سفلی, also Romanized as Qahremānlūy-e Soflá; also known as Qahremānlū-ye Soflá) is a village in Bash Qaleh Rural District, in the Central District of Urmia County, West Azerbaijan Province, Iran. At the 2006 census, its population was 257, in 77 families.
