= Road 33 (Iran) =

Road in Iran

Road 33
- جاده 33
- Qafqaz (Caucuses) Highway

Route information
- Length: 155 km (96 mi)

Major junctions
- From: Ardabil, Ardabil; Road 16; Imam Khomeini Street
- Road 14; Road 12
- To: Bileh Savar, Ardabil; Azerbaijan R43 road to Bilasuvar

Location
- Country: Iran
- Provinces: Ardabil
- Major cities: Razi, Ardabil; Germi, Ardabil

Highway system
- Highways in Iran; Freeways

Road 33 (also known as Qafqaz (Caucuses) Highway) is a road in Iran's Ardabil Province connecting Ardabil to Germi and Bileh Savar, crossing into Republic of Azerbaijan.
