= Buin Zahra =

City in Qazvin province, Iran

Buin Zahra Persian: بوئين زهرا
- City
- Location within Iran
- Coordinates: 35°46′01″N 50°03′18″E
- Country: Iran
- Province: Qazvin
- County: Buin Zahra
- District: Central

Population (2016)
  - Total: 20,823
- Time zone: UTC+3:30 (IRST)

Buin Zahra (Persian: بوئين زهرا) (Note: Also romanized as Booin-Zahra and Bū’īn Zahrā; also known as Booin (بوئين), also romanized as Bū’īn and Būyīn) is a city in the Central District of Buin Zahra County, Qazvin province, Iran, serving as capital of both the county and the district.

== Demographics ==
=== Language and ethnicity ===
Native people and the main residents of Buin Zahra city speak Azerbaijani Turkish with a Qazvini accent.

=== Population ===
At the time of the 2006 National Census, the city's population was 15,848 in 4,250 households. The following census in 2011 counted 18,210 people in 5,248 households. The 2016 census measured the population of the city as 20,823 people in 6,298 households.

== Transportation ==
- Road 38 (Iran)
- Road 49 (Iran)

== See also ==
- Buein Zahra Technical University
- Buein Zahra earthquake
