= Hasanabad-e Kuh Gach =

Hasanabad-e Kuh Gach حسن ابادكوه گچ
- Village
- Location within Iran
- Coordinates: 35°11′48″N 51°48′00″E
- Country: Iran
- Province: Tehran
- County: Varamin
- Bakhsh: Javadabad
- Rural District: Behnamarab-e Jonubi

Population (2006)
  - Total: 291
- Time zone: UTC+3:30 (IRST)
  - Summer (DST): UTC+4:30 (IRDT)

Hasanabad-e Kuh Gach (Persian: حسن ابادكوه گچ, also Romanized as Ḩasanābād-e Kūh Gach; also known as Ḩasanābād-e ‘Arab and Ḩasanābād) is a village in Behnamarab-e Jonubi Rural District, Javadabad District, Varamin County, Tehran Province, Iran. At the 2006 census, its population was 291, in 69 families.
