= Qahremanluy-e Olya =

Qahremanluy-e Olya قهرمانلوی علیا
- Village
- Location within Iran
- Coordinates: 37°38′11″N 45°09′27″E
- Country: Iran
- Province: West Azerbaijan
- County: Urmia
- Bakhsh: Central
- Rural District: Bash Qaleh

Population (2006)
  - Total: 189
- Time zone: UTC+3:30 (IRST)
  - Summer (DST): UTC+4:30 (IRDT)

Qahremanluy-e Olya (Persian: قهرمانلوی علیا, also Romanized as Qahremānlūy-e ‘Olyā; also known as Qahramānlū, Qahramānlū ‘Olyā, Qahremānlarī-ye ‘Olyā, and Qahremānlū-ye ‘Olyā) is a village in Bash Qaleh Rural District, in the Central District of Urmia County, West Azerbaijan Province, Iran. At the 2006 census, its population was 189, in 58 families.
