= Chitgar Park =

Forest park in western Tehran, Iran

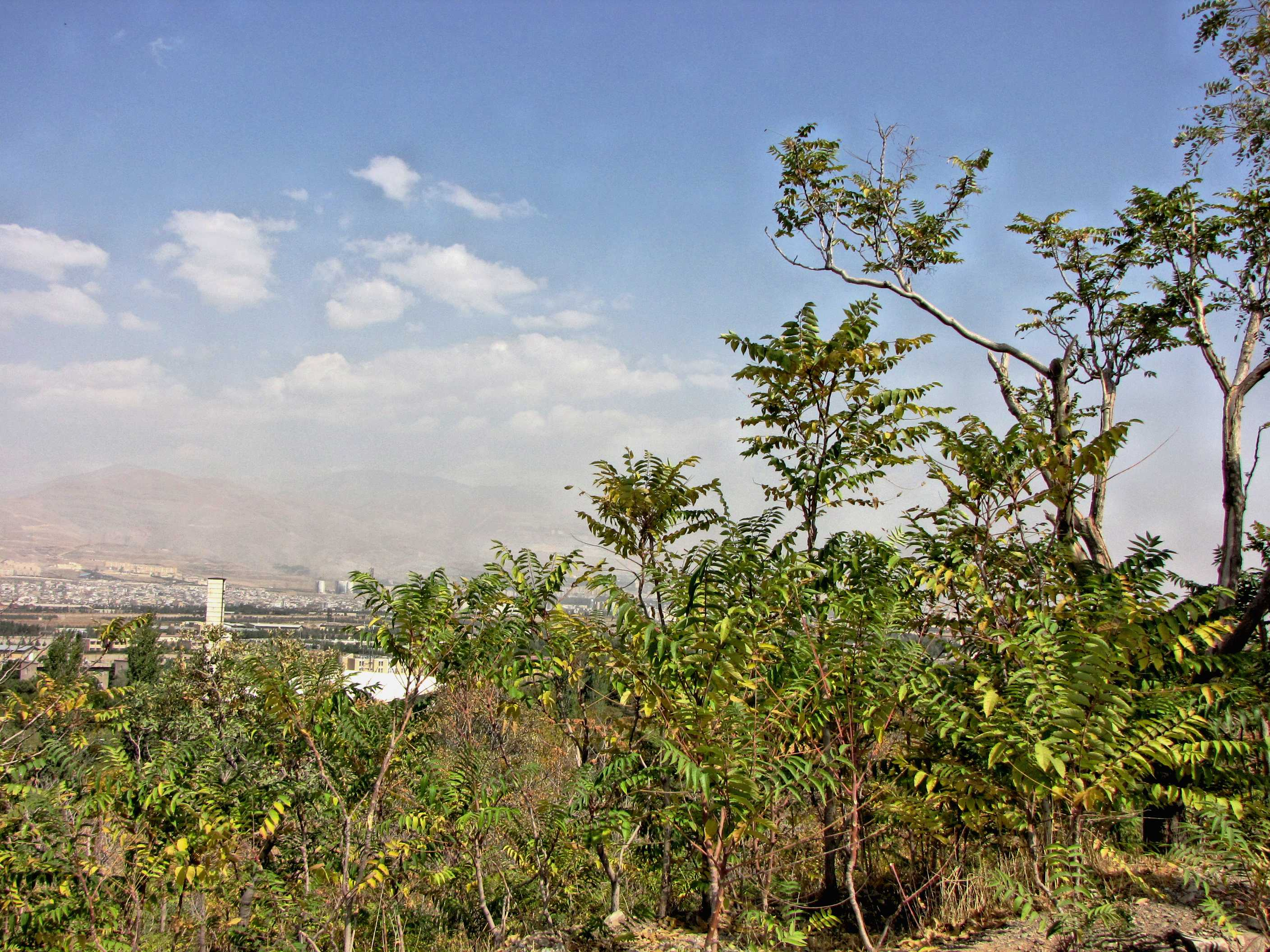
- Interactive map of Chitgar Park
- Type: Forest park
- Location: Western Tehran, Iran
- Coordinates: 35.7339°N 51.2097°E
- Area: 14.5 square kilometres (5.6 sq mi)

Chitgar Park (Persian: بوستان جنگلی چیتگر) is a forest park situated in western Tehran, Iran. It covers an area of about 14.5 square kilometer.

== Geography ==
Chitgar Park lies within the borders of District 22 of the city of Tehran. The park is served by a highway and a metro line. The metro station is also called Chitgar.
