= Road 38 (Iran) =

Road in Iran

Road 38
- جاده 38

Route information
- Length: 158 km (98 mi)

Major junctions
- From: Tehran, Tehran; Karaj Old Road
- Road 49
- To: Near Khorramdasht, Takestan; Road 37

Location
- Country: Iran
- Provinces: Tehran, Qazvin
- Major cities: Shahryar, Tehran; Buin Zahra, Qazvin

Highway system
- Highways in Iran; Freeways

Road 38 is a road connecting Tehran to Takestan and Hamedan Road.
