= Takestan =

City in Qazvin province, Iran

Takestan Persian: تاکستان
- City
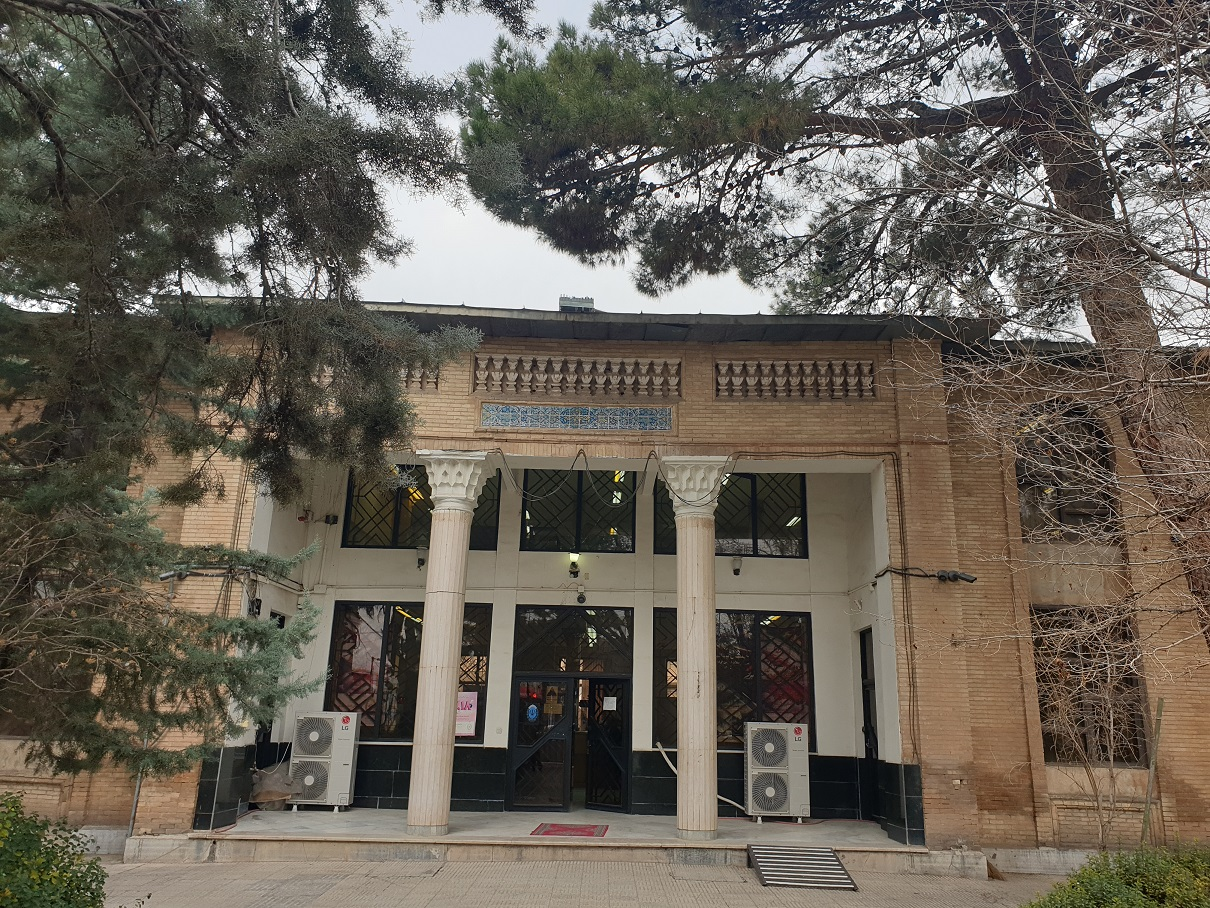
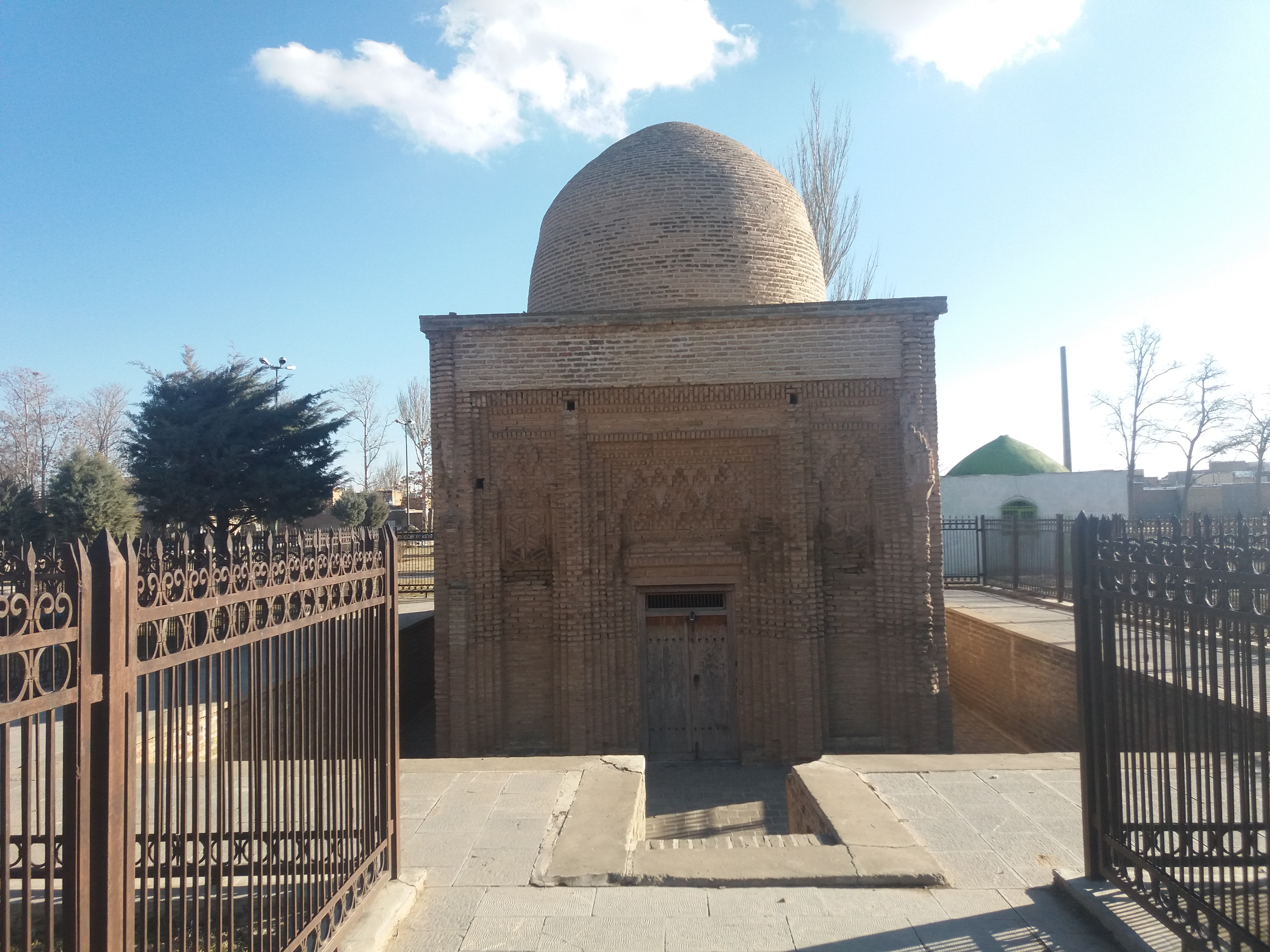
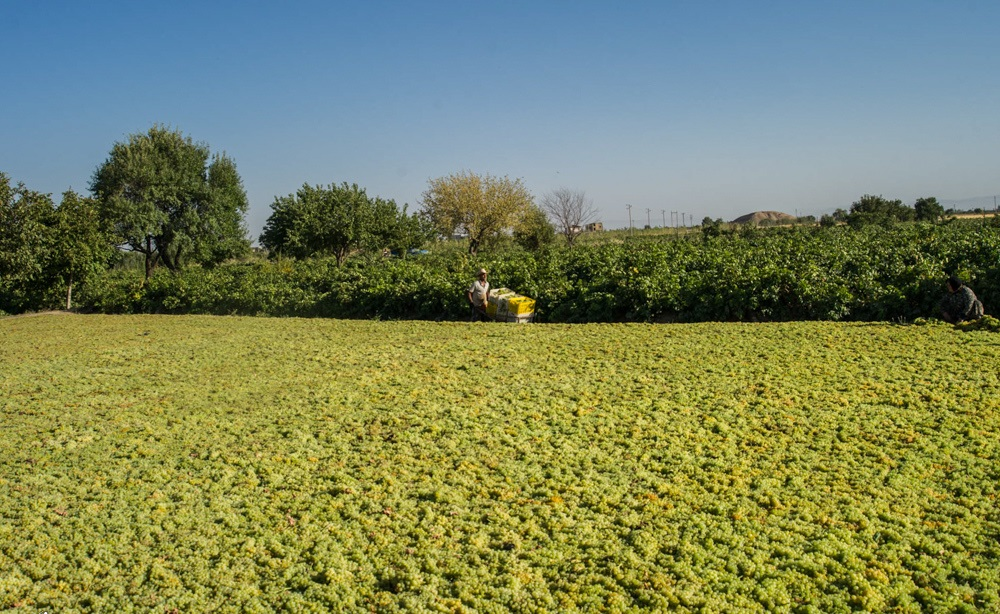
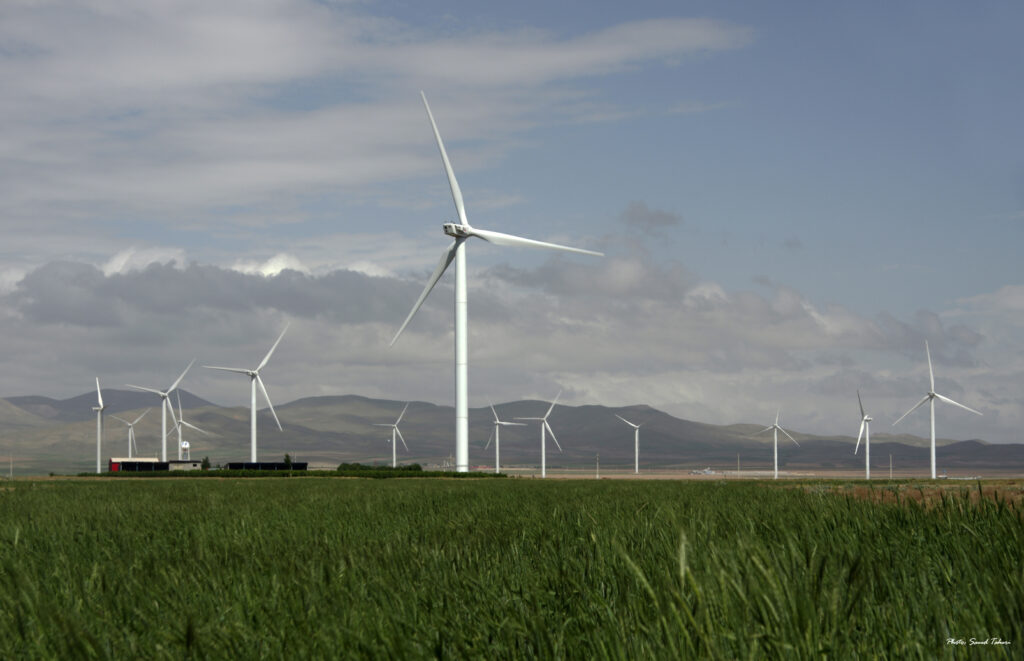
- Clockwise from the top: Shahi mansion, Bogheh-e-pir, vineyard, Takestan's wind farm

- Location within Iran
- Coordinates: 36°04′02″N 49°41′45″E
- Country: Iran
- Province: Qazvin
- County: Takestan
- District: Central

Population (2016)
  - Total: 80,299
- Time zone: UTC+3:30 (IRST)

Takestan (Persian: تاکستان) (Note: Also romanized as Tâkestân; also known as Siadehan and Siaden; and Tati: (سیادن), romanized as Siyâden) is a city in the Central District of Takestan County, Qazvin province, Iran, serving as capital of both the county and the district. Takestan has a railway station on the Teheran-Tabriz line. The name Takestan literally means "vineyard."

== Demographics ==
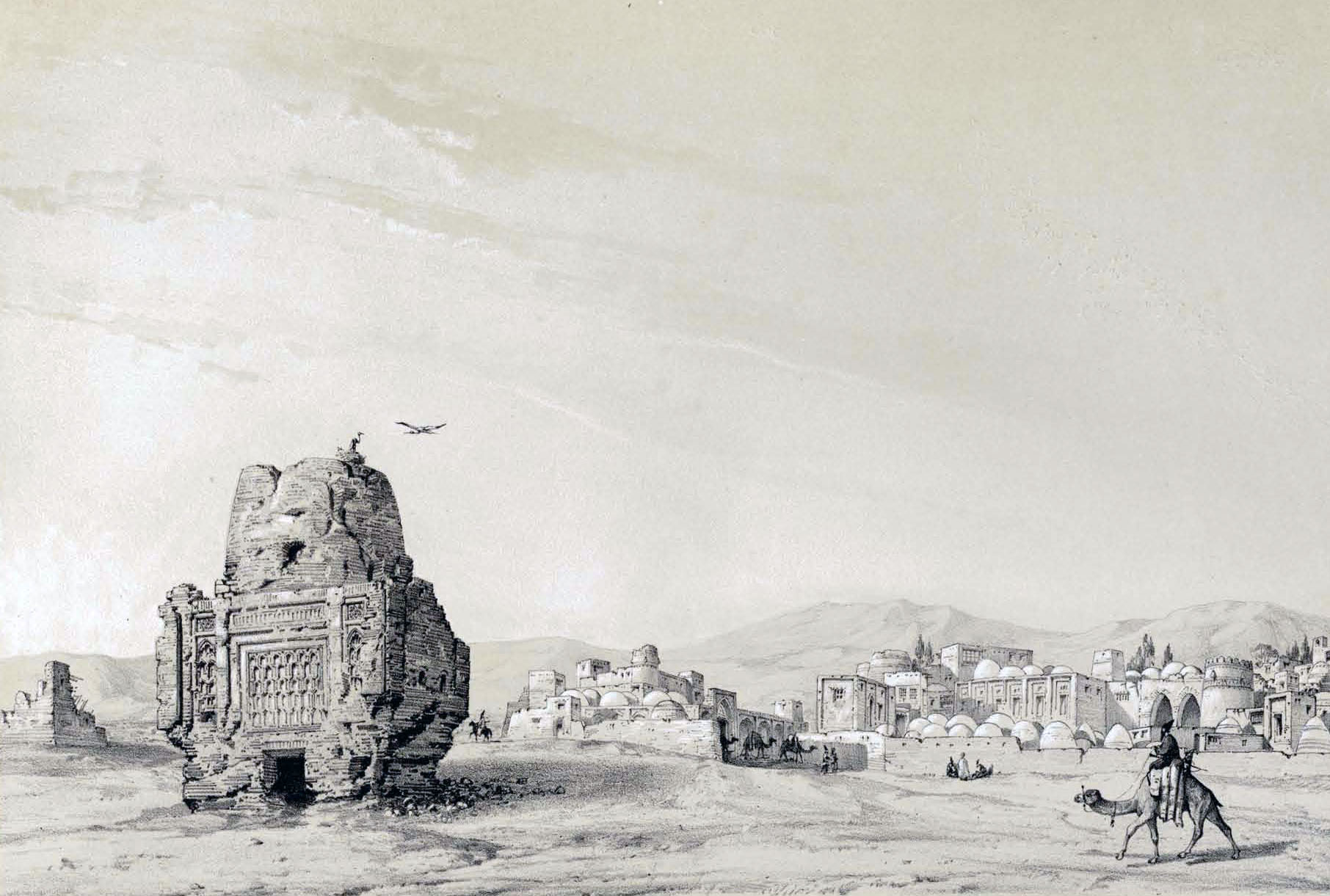
Village Siadeh (Takestan) by Eugène Flandin, 1840

=== Ethnicity ===
Most of the population of Takestan belong to the Tat ethnic group and Azerbaijanis. Takestan is the largest Tat-populated city in the world.

=== Population ===
At the time of the 2006 National Census, the city's population was 73,625 in 18,685 households. The following census in 2011 counted 77,907 people in 22,894 households. The 2016 census measured the population of the city as 80,299 people in 24,595 households.

== Historical sites ==
- Pir Mausoleum: The Pir mausoleum, alternatively known as "Pir-e Takestan" and "Imamzadeh Pir," is a small, domed building dating from the 11th-century Seljuk era and has since been restored. Only little of the original ornamental decorations remains.
