= Baghcheh, Mashhad =

Village in Razavi Khorasan province, Iran

Baghcheh Persian: باغچه
- Village
- Location within Iran
- Coordinates: 35°58′54″N 59°35′48″E
- Country: Iran
- Province: Razavi Khorasan
- County: Mashhad
- District: Ahmadabad
- Rural District: Sarjam

Population (2016)
  - Total: 622
- Time zone: UTC+3:30 (IRST)

Baghcheh (Persian: باغچه) (Note: Also romanized as Bāghcheh) is a village in Sarjam Rural District of Ahmadabad District in Mashhad County, Razavi Khorasan province, Iran.

== Demographics ==
=== Population ===
At the time of the 2006 National Census, the village's population was 382 in 87 households. The following census in 2011 counted 451 people in 122 households. The 2016 census measured the population of the village as 622 people in 184 households.
