= Road 21 (Iran) =

Road in Iran

Road 21
- جاده 21

Route information
- Part of AH82
- Length: 978 km (608 mi)

Major junctions
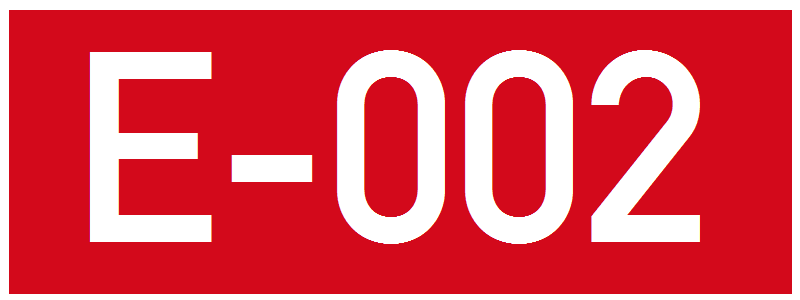
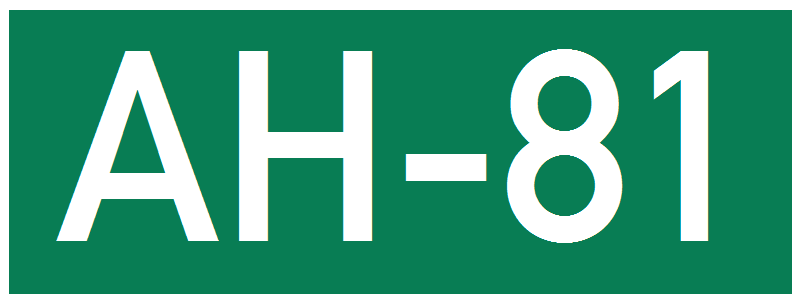
- From: R 65 to M 8 / E002 / AH81 at Jolfa at Azerbaijani border
- Road 11; Road 144; Road 32; Road 14; Freeway 2; Road 16; Road 24; Road 213; Road 26; Road 15; Road 46; Road 15; Road 48; Road 19
- To: Road 17 at Ilam

Location
- Country: Iran
- Provinces: East Azerbaijan, West Azerbaijan, Kordestan, Kermanshah, Ilam
- Major cities: Tabriz, East Azerbaijan; Bonab, East Azerbaijan; Miandoab, Bukan, West Azerbaijan; Saqez, Kordestan; Sanandaj, Kordestan; Kermanshah, Kermanshah; Sarableh, Ilam

Highway system
- Highways in Iran; Freeways

Road 21 is a road in west and north-west Iran. It connects western province capitals to each other and to Azerbaijan border.
