= Road 16 (Iran) =

Road in Iran

Road 16
- جاده 16

Route information
- Length: 428 km (266 mi)

Major junctions
- From: Astara, Gilan; Road 49
- Road 33; Road 165; Road 32; Road 21; Road 11
- To: Serow, West Azarbaijan; Turkey D.400

Location
- Country: Iran
- Provinces: Gilan, Ardabil, East Azerbaijan, West Azerbaijan
- Major cities: Ardabil, Ardabil; Sarab, Ardabil; Tabriz, East Azerbaijan; Urmia, West Azerbaijan

Highway system
- Highways in Iran; Freeways

Road 16 is a road in the northwest of Iran, which starts from Gilan and passes the cities of Tabriz, Ardabil and Sarab and is connected to Turkey. Some important stretches of Road 16 include Urmia Lake Bridge.

== Urmia Lake Bridge ==
This bridge goes through Lake Urmia and connects the Iranian provinces of East Azerbaijan and West Azerbaijan. The highway was completed on 23 Aban, 1387 (13 November 2008). It is the largest bridge project in Iran. This bridge is the longest bridge with seventeen hundred meters and reduces the distance between Tabriz and Urmia by 135 kilometers. Via the bridge the distance from Tehran to Urmia is 780 kilometers. This bridge has an important role in the development of the cultural exchanges, tourism and trade between the two provinces of East Azerbaijan and West Azerbaijan, saves time and fuel and reduces road accidents.
