= District 22 (Tehran) =

District 22 Mantaqe ye Bist-o-Dow (منطقه بیست و دو)
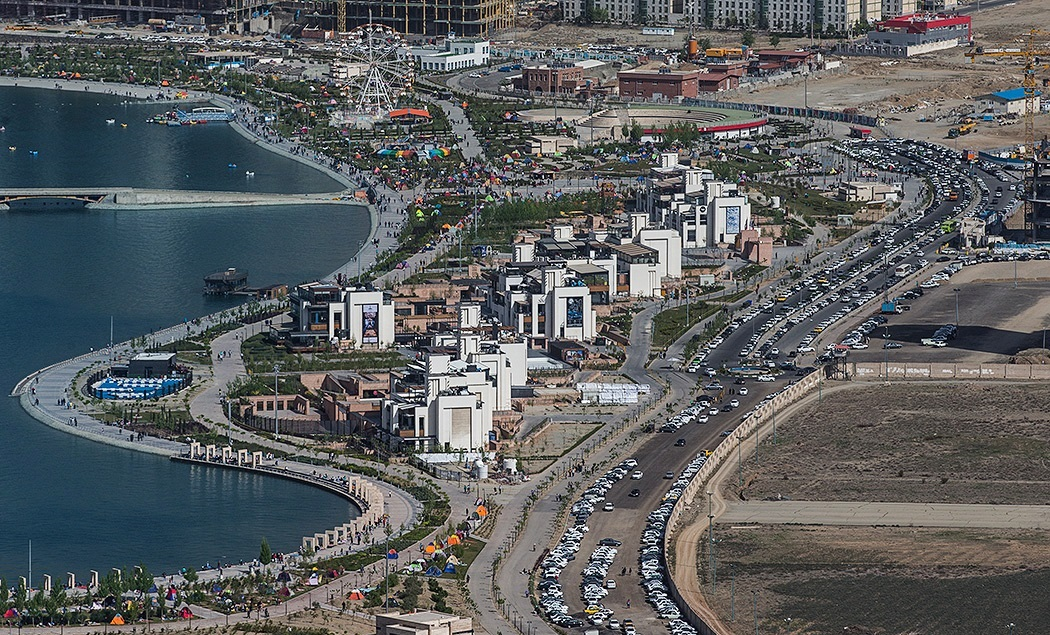
- Aerial photographs of District 22

- Coordinates: 35.7492447°N 51.1228051°E
- Country: Iran
- Province: Tehran Province
- County: Tehran County

Government
  - Mayor: Mohammad Javad Khosravi

Area
  - Total: 6,030 ha (14,900 acres)

Population
  - Total: 128,985

District 22 (Persian: منطقه ۲۲, also romanized as Mantaqe ye Bist-o-Dow), also known as Municipality of District 22, is one of 22 central districts of Tehran County in Tehran Province, Iran.

As of 2010 census, its population was 128,958, in 38,136 families.

Municipality of District 22 has 4 regions and 9 quarters and provides services to the public and does its organizational tasks. One of the neighborhoods in the district is known as the Olympic Village, which comprises the athletes village built for the 1974 Asian Games, held in Tehran.

== History ==
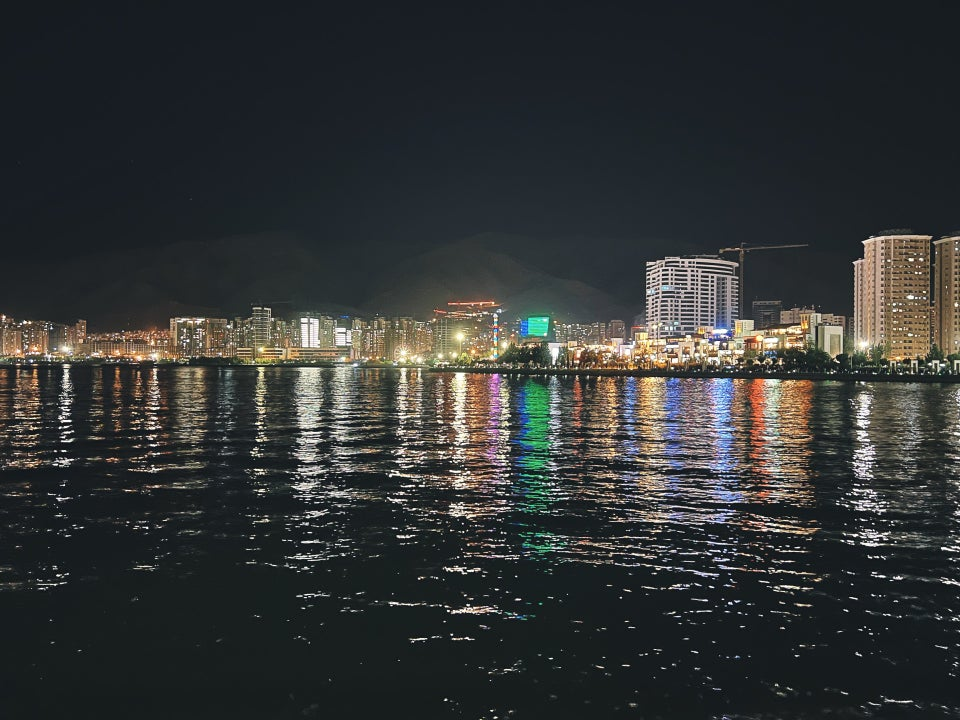
The lake and the view of the residential towers

Prior to the 1979 Iranian revolution, the lands that make up District 22 were the property of the Farmanfarmaian and Firouzgar's families. The families had intended to develop the land as a new satellite suburb of Tehran and plans were drawn up by Abdol Aziz Farman-Farmaian and Associates (AFFA). Shortly after the revolution the lands were forcibly confiscated and distributed to various IRGC related bodies. The development plans for the district as drawn up by Abol-Aziz Farmanfarmaian were also discarded.
