= Bazargan, Iran =

City in West Azerbaijan province, Iran

Bazargan Persian: بازرگان
- City
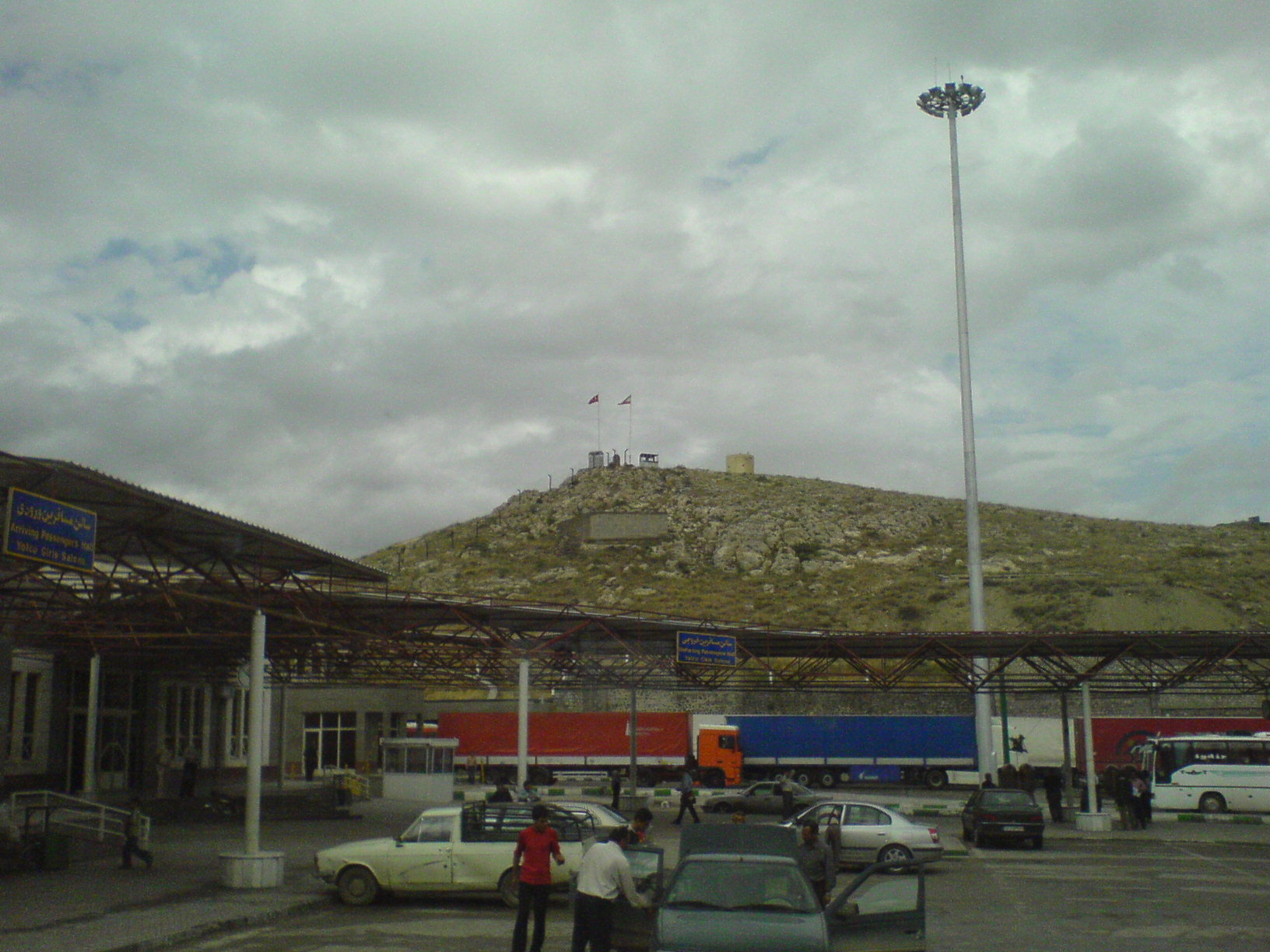
- Iran-Turkey Border in Bazargan.

- Location within Iran
- Coordinates: 39°23′23″N 44°23′21″E
- Country: Iran
- Province: West Azerbaijan
- County: Maku
- District: Bazargan
- Established as a city: 1996

Population (2016)
  - Total: 9,979
- Time zone: UTC+3:30 (IRST)

Bazargan (Persian: بازرگان) (Note: Also romanized as Bāzargān and Bāzergān; also known as Bāzarqān) is a city in, and the capital of, Bazargan District in Maku County, West Azerbaijan province, Iran.

== History ==
Until well within the 20th century, Bazargan was not much more than a small village, located at an altitude of 1,550 meters on a delta above the Aqchay river. Bazargan's inhabitants, of Turkish origin, were generally involved in traditional agricultural activities. In 1913, the village was ceded by the Ottoman Empire to Qajar Iran. The village of Bazargan has only developed recently (and that in a limited way), due to the existence of the nearby frontier crossing with Turkey.

Prior to the 19th century, Bazargan was visited only by few travelers. The French duo Eugène Flandin and Pascal Coste mentioned the village as "Bazirgan" on the map they created showing the daybook and schedule followed by the French embassy to Iranian ruler Mohammad Shah Qajar (r. 1834–1848) in 1840. Picot noted in 1894 that caravans heading to Erzurum in the Ottoman Empire from Tabriz sometimes stopped in the village of Bazargan, which, at the time, numbered only ten houses. The usual route, located further to the south, linked Khoy directly to Doğubayazıt through Avajiq and did not pass through Bazargan at any point.

The road through Bazargan has only been in common use in very recent times, as there had been very little communication between the Turkish-held parts of historic Armenia and the Tabriz region of Iran until diplomatic relations between Iran and Turkey became of a more developed kind.

As late as 1930, the automobile road still halted at Maku on the Iranian side and Doğubayazıt in Turkey and did not reach Bazargan. The actual Iranian-Turkish frontier had then to be crossed by foot after a day's walk which was considered to be "frequently arduous" as the countryside was barren with very harsh climate in winter at the foothills of nearby Mount Ararat. During the reign of Iranian ruler Reza Shah (r. 1925–1941), the automobile road was paved; however, it still "did not really become passable all year round until after World War II". The Iranian government then built, with Turkish cooperation, a customs and police administration building.

However, as late as 1963, it was still estimated that "no more than 800 people a week" used the border crossing at Bazargan. In 1956, the village of Bazargan only had 312 inhabitants. Soon after, a second village gradually grew up, which consisted of buildings for Bazargan's frontier post, at a spot where they are protected from the wind. According to census figures, Bazargan had 783 inhabitants in 1966, in addition to electricity, a post office and some public services.

After 1971, Bazargan grew steadily when the road between Erzurum and Tabriz was entirely asphalted. After 1974, due to increases in oil prices, Iran started to import large numbers of goods, a change which would heavily impact Bazargan. As Bazargan was basically the only frontier post on the overland route between Iran and Europe, traffic at Bazargan skyrocketed.

By 1975, cargo traffic had reached 2,5 million tons at Bazargan, with cargo trucks "lined up for more than 40 kilometers". Due to these changes, which were very advantageous for Bazargan, numerous additional facilities have been constructed at the border city, including restaurants, inns and warehouses. By 1986, its population had surpassed 1,500, but, as the Encyclopædia Iranica states, the "transit trade has especially benefited Maku, where the majority of the employees of the frontier post live". The village of Bazargan was converted to a city in 1996.

== Demographics ==
=== Population ===
At the time of the 2006 National Census, the city's population was 9,047 in 2,126 households, when it was in the Central District. The following census in 2011 counted 9,551 people in 2,472 households, by which time the city had been separated from the district in the formation of Bazargan District. The 2016 census measured the population of the city as 9,979 people in 3,043 households.

== Sources ==
- Hourcade, Bernard (1989). "BĀZARGĀN". In Yarshater, Ehsan (ed.). Encyclopædia Iranica. Vol. IV/1: Bāyju–Behruz. London and New York: Routledge & Kegan Paul. p. 52. ISBN 978-0-71009-124-6.
