= Kheyrabad-e Pain, Baharestan =

Village in Tehran province, Iran

Kheyrabad-e Pain Persian: خيرآباد پايين
- Village
- Location within Iran
- Coordinates: 35°31′46″N 51°09′13″E
- Country: Iran
- Province: Tehran
- County: Baharestan
- District: Bostan
- Rural District: Hamedanak

Population (2016)
  - Total: 417
- Time zone: UTC+3:30 (IRST)

Kheyrabad-e Pain (Persian: خيرآباد پايين) is a village in Hamedanak Rural District of Bostan District of Baharestan County, Tehran province, Iran.

== History ==
After the 2006 National Census, Bostan and Golestan Districts (except the city of Nasirshahr) were separated from Robat Karim County in the establishment of Baharestan County.

== Demographics ==
=== Population ===
At the time of the 2016 census, Kheyrabad-e Pain's population was 417 people in 121 households. It was the least populous of the three villages in its rural district.
