= Kheyrabad, Baharestan =

Neighborhood in Tehran province, Iran

Kheyrabad Persian: خیرآباد
- Neighborhood
- Location within Iran
- Coordinates: 35°32′33″N 51°08′55″E
- Country: Iran
- Province: Tehran
- County: Baharestan
- District: Bostan
- City: Nasimshahr

Population (2011)
  - Total: 17,267
- Time zone: UTC+3:30 (IRST)

Kheyrabad (Persian: خیرآباد) (Note: Also romanized as Kheyrābād) is a neighborhood in the city of Nasimshahr in Bostan District of Baharestan County, Tehran province, Iran.

== Demographics ==
=== Population ===
At the time of the 2006 National Census, Kheyrabad's population was 14,018 in 3,240 households, when it was a village in Hamedanak Rural District of Robat Karim County. The following census in 2011 counted 17,267 people in 4,645 households, by which time the district had been separated from the county in the establishment of Baharestan County. Kheyrabad was annexed by the city of Nasimshahr in 2021.
