= Hamedanak =

Village in Tehran province, Iran

Hamedanak Persian: همدانک
- Village
- Location within Iran
- Coordinates: 35°32′32″N 51°08′18″E
- Country: Iran
- Province: Tehran
- County: Baharestan
- District: Bostan
- Rural District: Hamedanak

Population (2016)
  - Total: 11,216
- Time zone: UTC+3:30 (IRST)

Hamedanak (Persian: همدانک) (Note: Also romanized as Hamadānak and Hamedānak; also known as Hamdāng) is a village in, and the capital of, Hamedanak Rural District in Bostan District of Baharestan County, Tehran province, Iran.

== Demographics ==
=== Population ===
At the time of the 2006 National Census, the village's population was 9,261 in 2,200 households, when it was in Robat Karim County. The following census in 2011 counted 10,854 people in 2,908 households, by which time the district had been separated from the county in the establishment of Baharestan County. The 2016 census measured the population of the village as 11,216 people in 3,222 households.
