= Ovrin =

Village in Tehran province, Iran

Ovrin Persian: اورين
- Village
- Location within Iran
- Coordinates: 35°32′46″N 51°07′36″E
- Country: Iran
- Province: Tehran
- County: Baharestan
- District: Bostan
- Rural District: Hamedanak

Population (2016)
  - Total: 17,577
- Time zone: UTC+3:30 (IRST)

Ovrin (Persian: اورين) (Note: Also romanized as Avarīn and Ovrīn; also known as Orīn) is a village in Hamedanak Rural District, in Bostan District of Baharestan County, Tehran province, Iran.

== Demographics ==
=== Population ===
At the time of the 2006 National Census, the village's population was 9,615 in 2,340 households, when it was in Robat Karim County. The following census in 2011 counted 12,942 people in 3,571 households, by which time the district had been separated from the county in the establishment of Baharestan County. The 2016 census measured the population of the village as 17,577 people in 5,180 households. It was the most populous village in its rural district.
