= Battle of Robat Karim =

World War I battle in Iran between Russia and Iran

- Part of the Persian campaign in the Middle Eastern theatre of World War I, Russo-Persian Wars And The Caucasus campaign
| Date | 27 December [O.S. 9 December] 1915 |
| Location | Robat Karim, Tehran Province, Iran 35°28′55″N 51°04′51″E |
| Result | Russian victory |

Belligerents
| Russian Empire: Armenian Volunteers | Qajar Iran 1915 |

Commanders and leaders
| Nikolai Baratov | Ahmad Shah Qajar; Heydar Latifiyan † |

Units involved
| Russian Caucasus Army: Armenian Volunteers | Popular resistance forces Persian Gendarmerie |

Strength
| 668; 2 guns | 2,000 |

Casualties and losses
| Few | 500 captured |

The Battle of Robat Karim (Persian: نبرد رباط کریم, Russian: Бой под Рабат-Керимом, romanized: Boy pod Rabat-Kerimom) was fought by the Iranian people, around Robat Karim (near Tehran, Iran) during the First World War under the command of Heydar Latifiyan against the occupation of Iran by Russian forces. Although the result of this battle was the victory of the Russians, their goals were fulfilled and Iran was secured from the Central Powers, but in the larger goal, Iran was preserved during the First World War and never became a colony of any country.

== Preparations ==
=== Before World War I ===
The Persian campaign or invasion of Iran was a series of military conflicts between the Ottoman Empire, British Empire and Russian Empire in various areas of what was then neutral Qajar Iran, beginning in December 1914 as part of the Middle Eastern Theatre of World War I.

Persia declared its neutrality during the outbreak of the First World War. Despite this, the country quickly became affected by the pre-war rivalry between the Allies and the Central Powers. Foreign interests in Persia were primarily based on the country's strategic location between British India, Imperial Russia, Afghanistan and the Ottoman Empire, as well as the country's oil reserves, which were first discovered on 26 May 1908.

In the Anglo-Russian Treaty of 1907, the Russian and British governments agreed to divide Persia into three regions, with the Russians laying claim to northern Persia, the part adjacent to their previously conquered territories in the Transcaucasia, and the British claimed the south which bordered British India (a third region was left as a buffer zone). The 1907 treaty capped off several decades of the Great Game between the Russians and the British. The treaty was signed at a time when German imperial expansion into the region was underway and the agreement served both Russia and Britain by providing a counterweight to increasing German regional influence and potential future expansion into the region.

=== Beginning of Persian campaign ===
Russia was Iran's northern neighbor at that time and had many wars with Iran during the Qajar period. The British forces in the south and southeast of Iran had caused dissatisfaction among the Iranians by occupying parts of the Iranian soil under the pretext of protecting the interests of the Iranians.

During the First World War, despite the official announcement of Iran's neutrality, two countries, England and Russia, violated territorial sovereignty due to lack of trust.

When the Russian forces were advancing towards Tehran after signing the secret agreement of 1915 with England under the pretext of protecting the security of the embassy during Muharram, Mustofi al-Mamalek was under the influence of some of the million and following the democratic lawyers and distinguished men such as the late Modares believed that in.

== Forces ==
After the end of the Kuma offensive, Baratov was informed that the German agents were inciting the Persians to revolt. In order to avoid further setbacks, he sent a Teheran detachment of 668 with two guns to deal with the rebels. The detachment made a 70-mile march and was ambushed by 2,000 Persians.

== Battle zone ==
Robat Karim (Persian: رباطكريم) is a city in the Central District of Robat Karim County, Tehran province, Iran, serving as capital of both the county and the district.

One of the main reasons for the formation of the battle of Rabat Karim, the location of this city on the Silk Road and Khorasan pilgrimage route to Baghdad can be mentioned, and on the other hand, after Agha Mohammad Khan Qajar chose Tehran as the capital and he encouraged its construction and settlement. Tehran became the center of governmental and governmental affairs, the commuting of people to Tehran to meet their needs and perform administrative work from different parts of the country increased, and people from the southern regions of Iran, caravans, merchants and military units had to go from Rabat Karim, which is on the Saveh road to Tehran. It was true that they were passing through, which gradually attracted immigrants from various cities to Rabat Karim.

== Last fight ==
The Russians took refuge in a safe place and began to encircle the positions of the Iranians with artillery, after which the commander of the Belomestnov ordered a decisive attack, part of the Persian detachment fled at the sight of the Cossacks, who hacked down the retreating troops. The battle ended with the complete success of the Russians. Entente troops lost only a few people, and the Iranians 245 killed.

== Result ==
If Tehran (the royal capital of Iran) was captured by the Russian army, Iran would become one of the permanent colonies of Tsarist Russia. Due to popular resistance in the Battle of Robat Karim (although Iranian people were killed and Russia won), time was provided to separate the capital of the state and the capital of the monarchy, and thus Iran was saved from the danger of complete collapse. Although the result of this battle was the victory of the Russians, but in the larger goal, Iran was preserved during the First World War and never became a colony of any country.

== Aftermath ==
Ahmad Matin-Daftari (later Prime Minister of Iran) mentions the tragic fate and death of these resistance forces in his memoirs.

After the defeat of Robat Karim's popular resistance and his death, Abdul Hossein Farmanfarma expressed his regret through a telegram sent to Isfahan and told the National Defense Committee that: In addition to the 7-8-year exams and the Saveh and Rabat Karim exams, I will sit for one more exam in Isfahan and forcefully invite the foreign army to the middle of Iran, which is Isfahan..."

At the same time, all the goals of the Russians were fulfilled, after the victory, the central powers will never again be able to provoke the Persians into a big uprising against the Entente.
