= Meymanatabad, Tehran =

Village in Tehran province, Iran

Meymanatabad Persian: ميمنت اباد
- Village
- Location within Iran
- Coordinates: 35°30′03″N 51°09′05″E
- Country: Iran
- Province: Tehran
- County: Baharestan
- District: Golestan
- Rural District: Meymanat

Population (2016)
  - Total: 5,821
- Time zone: UTC+3:30 (IRST)

Meymanatabad (Persian: ميمنت اباد) (Note: Also romanized as Meymanatābād; also known as Meymūnābād; formerly known as Meymanabad (ميمناباد)) is a village in, and the capital of, Meymanat Rural District in Golestan District of Baharestan County, Tehran province, Iran. The previous capital of the rural district was the village of Nasirabad, now the city of Nasirshahr.

== Demographics ==
=== Population ===
At the time of the 2006 National Census, the village's population was 6,135 in 1,447 households, when it was in Robat Karim County. The following census in 2011 counted 6,828 people in 1,745 households, by which time the district had been separated from the county in the establishment of Baharestan County. The 2016 census measured the population of the village as 5,821 people in 1,615 households. It was the most populous of the two villages in its rural district.
