= Riyeh =

Village in Tehran province, Iran

Riyeh Persian: ريه
- Village
- Location within Iran
- Coordinates: 35°29′20″N 51°09′37″E
- Country: Iran
- Province: Tehran
- County: Baharestan
- District: Golestan
- Rural District: Meymanat

Population (2016)
  - Total: 1,532
- Time zone: UTC+3:30 (IRST)

Riyeh (Persian: ريه) (Note: Also romanized as Reyeh and Rīyeh) is a village in Meymanat Rural District of Golestan District in Baharestan County, Tehran province, Iran.

== Demographics ==
=== Population ===
At the time of the 2006 National Census, the village's population was 972 in 244 households, when it was in Robat Karim County. The following census in 2011 counted 1,430 people in 371 households, by which time the district had been separated from the county in the establishment of Baharestan County. The 2016 census measured the population of the village as 1,532 people in 428 households.
