= Emamzadeh Baqer =

Village in Tehran province, Iran

Emamzadeh Baqer Persian: امامزاده باقر
- Village
- Location within Iran
- Coordinates: 35°29′24″N 51°11′08″E
- Country: Iran
- Province: Tehran
- County: Baharestan
- District: Golestan
- Rural District: Salehabad

Population (2016)
  - Total: 1,134
- Time zone: UTC+3:30 (IRST)

Emamzadeh Baqer (Persian: امامزاده باقر) (Note: Also romanized as Emāmzādeh Bāqer) is a village in Salehabad Rural District of Golestan District of Baharestan County, Tehran province, Iran.

== Demographics ==
=== Population ===
At the time of the 2006 National Census, the village's population was 722 in 173 households, when it was in Robat Karim County. The following census in 2011 counted 983 people in 275 households, by which time the district had been separated from the county in the establishment of Baharestan County. The 2016 census measured the population of the village as 1,134 people in 350 households. It was the only village in its rural district.
