= Manjilabad =

Village in Tehran province, Iran

Manjilabad Persian: منجيل اباد
- Village
- Location within Iran
- Coordinates: 35°32′37″N 51°03′35″E
- Country: Iran
- Province: Tehran
- County: Robat Karim
- District: Central
- Rural District: Manjilabad

Population (2016)
  - Total: 2,648
- Time zone: UTC+3:30 (IRST)

Manjilabad (Persian: منجيل اباد) (Note: Also romanized as Manjīlābād) is a village in, and the capital of, Manjilabad Rural District in the Central District of Robat Karim County, Tehran province, Iran.

== Demographics ==
=== Population ===
At the time of the 2006 National Census, the village's population was 3,062 in 817 households. The following census in 2011 counted 3,146 people in 929 households. The 2016 census measured the population of the village as 2,648 people in 834 households.
