= Now Deh, Robat Karim =

Village in Tehran province, Iran

Now Deh Persian: نوده
- Village
- Location within Iran
- Coordinates: 35°27′27″N 51°07′32″E
- Country: Iran
- Province: Tehran
- County: Robat Karim
- District: Central
- Rural District: Vahnabad

Population (2016)
  - Total: 591
- Time zone: UTC+3:30 (IRST)

Now Deh (Persian: نوده) (Note: Also romanized as Naudeh) is a village in Vahnabad Rural District of the Central District in Robat Karim County, Tehran province, Iran.

== Demographics ==
=== Population ===
At the time of the 2006 National Census, the village's population was 482 in 114 households. The following census in 2011 counted 689 people in 186 households. The 2016 census measured the population of the village as 591 people in 165 households.
