= Shotor Khvar, Robat Karim =

Village in Tehran province, Iran

Shotor Khvar Persian: شترخوار
- Village
- Location within Iran
- Coordinates: 35°27′39″N 51°06′53″E
- Country: Iran
- Province: Tehran
- County: Robat Karim
- District: Central
- Rural District: Vahnabad

Population (2016)
  - Total: 5,360
- Time zone: UTC+3:30 (IRST)

Shotor Khvar (Persian: شترخوار) (Note: Also romanized as Shotor Khvār; also known as Shuturkhwār, Sefīd Daleh, and Shotor Khān) is a village in Vahnabad Rural District of the Central District in Robat Karim County, Tehran province, Iran.

== Demographics ==
=== Population ===
At the time of the 2006 National Census, the village's population was 2,567 in 632 households. The following census in 2011 counted 4,455 people in 1,219 households. The 2016 census measured the population of the village as 5,360 people in 1,627 households. It was the most populous village in its rural district.
