= Kazemabad, Tehran =

Village in Tehran province, Iran

Kazemabad Persian: كاظم اباد
- Village
- Location within Iran
- Coordinates: 35°32′44″N 51°05′54″E
- Country: Iran
- Province: Tehran
- County: Robat Karim
- District: Central
- Rural District: Emamzadeh Abu Taleb

Population (2016)
  - Total: 1,278
- Time zone: UTC+3:30 (IRST)

Kazemabad (Persian: كاظم اباد) (Note: Also romanized as Kāz̧emābād) is a village in Emamzadeh Abu Taleb Rural District of the Central District in Robat Karim County, Tehran province, Iran.

== Demographics ==
=== Population ===
At the time of the 2006 National Census, the village's population was 1,206 in 294 households. The following census in 2011 counted 1,243 people in 344 households. The 2016 census measured the population of the village as 1,278 people in 358 households.
