= Aliabad, Robat Karim =

Village in Tehran province, Iran

Aliabad Persian: علي اباد
- Village
- Location within Iran
- Coordinates: 35°26′46″N 51°10′57″E
- Country: Iran
- Province: Tehran
- County: Robat Karim
- District: Central
- Rural District: Vahnabad

Population (2016)
  - Total: 868
- Time zone: UTC+3:30 (IRST)

Aliabad (Persian: علي اباد) (Note: Also romanized as ‘Alīābād) is a village in Vahnabad Rural District of the Central District in Robat Karim County, Tehran province, Iran.

== Demographics ==
=== Population ===
At the time of the 2006 National Census, the village's population was 672 in 185 households. The following census in 2011 counted 833 people in 245 households. The 2016 census measured the population of the village as 868 people in 251 households.
