= Hoseynabad-e Yengejeh =

Village in Tehran province, Iran

Hoseynabad-e Yengejeh Persian: حسين ابادينگجه
- Village
- Location within Iran
- Coordinates: 35°32′41″N 51°02′32″E
- Country: Iran
- Province: Tehran
- County: Robat Karim
- District: Central
- Rural District: Manjilabad

Population (2016)
  - Total: 148
- Time zone: UTC+3:30 (IRST)

Hosseinabad-e Robat Karim

Hoseynabad-e Yengejeh (Persian: حسين ابادينگجه) (Note: Also romanized as Hoseynabad-e Yangejeh and Ḩoseynābād-e Yangejeh; also known as Ḩoseynābād and Ḩoseynābād-e Yangecheh) is a village in Manjilabad Rural District of the Central District in Robat Karim County, Tehran province, Iran.

== Demographics ==
=== Population ===
At the time of the 2006 National Census, the village's population was 118 in 26 households. The following census in 2011 counted 110 people in 26 households. The 2016 census measured the population of the village as 148 people in 42 households.
