= Adaran, Tehran =

Village in Tehran province, Iran

Adaran Persian: ادران
- Village
- Location within Iran
- Coordinates: 35°31′53″N 51°07′11″E
- Country: Iran
- Province: Tehran
- County: Robat Karim
- District: Central
- Rural District: Emamzadeh Abu Taleb

Population (2016)
  - Total: 2,322
- Time zone: UTC+3:30 (IRST)

Adaran (Persian: ادران) (Note: Also romanized as Ādarān and Āderān) is a village in, and the capital of, Emamzadeh Abu Taleb Rural District in the Central District of Robat Karim County, Tehran province, Iran.

== Demographics ==
=== Population ===
At the time of the 2006 National Census, the village's population was 2,562 in 664 households. The following census in 2011 counted 2,556 people in 701 households. The 2016 census measured the population of the village as 2,322 people in 676 households. It was the most populous village in its rural district.
