= Yeqeh =

Village in Tehran province, Iran

Yeqeh Persian: يقه
- Village

- Location within Iran
- Coordinates: 35°33′20″N 51°02′17″E
- Country: Iran
- Province: Tehran
- County: Robat Karim
- District: Central
- Rural District: Manjilabad

Population (2016)
  - Total: 339
- Time zone: UTC+3:30 (IRST)

Yeqeh (Persian: يقه) (Note: Also romanized as Yaqeh) is a village in Manjilabad Rural District of the Central District in Robat Karim County, Tehran province, Iran.

== Demographics ==
=== Population ===
At the time of the 2006 National Census, the village's population was 409 in 98 households. The following census in 2011 counted 415 people in 119 households. The 2016 census measured the population of the village as 339 people in 105 households.
