= Shahrak-e Yarnedak =

Village in Tehran province, Iran

Shahrak-e Yarnedak Persian: شهرک یرندک
- Village
- Country: Iran
- Province: Tehran
- County: Robat Karim
- District: Central
- Rural District: Manjilabad

Population (2016)
  - Total: 1,012
- Time zone: UTC+3:30 (IRST)

Shahrak-e Yarnedak (Persian: شهرک یرندک) (Note: Also romanized as Shahraḵ-e Yarnedaḵ) is a village in Manjilabad Rural District of the Central District in Robat Karim County, Tehran province, Iran.

== Demographics ==
=== Population ===
At the time of the 2006 National Census, the village's population was 885 in 248 households. The following census in 2011 counted 1,126 people in 347 households. The 2016 census measured the population of the village as 1,012 people in 344 households.
