= Shahrabad-e Ilat =

Village in Tehran province, Iran

Shahrabad-e Ilat Persian: شهرابادايلات
- Village
- Location within Iran
- Coordinates: 35°32′40″N 50°59′51″E
- Country: Iran
- Province: Tehran
- County: Robat Karim
- District: Central
- Rural District: Manjilabad

Population (2016)
  - Total: 631
- Time zone: UTC+3:30 (IRST)

Shahrabad-e Ilat (Persian: شهرابادايلات) (Note: Also romanized as Shahrābād-e Īlāt; also known as Ḩeşārābād-e Īlāt) is a village in Manjilabad Rural District of the Central District in Robat Karim County, Tehran province, Iran.

== Demographics ==
=== Population ===
At the time of the 2006 National Census, the village's population was 666 in 162 households. The following census in 2011 counted 477 people in 142 households. The 2016 census measured the population of the village as 631 people in 169 households.
