= Parand =

City in Tehran province, Iran

Parand Persian: پرند
- City
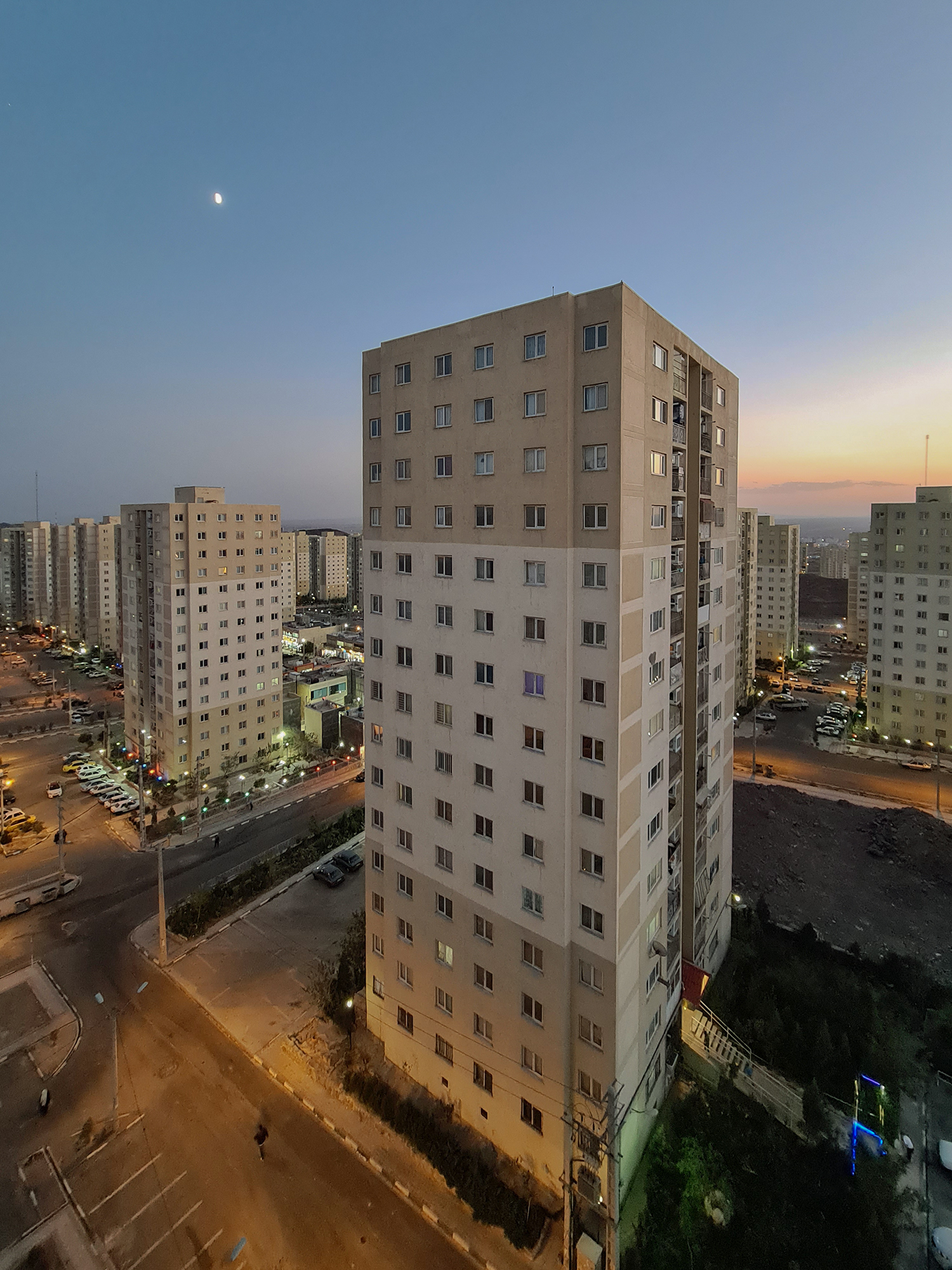
- Apartment building in the city of Parand

- Location within Iran
- Coordinates: 35°28′45″N 50°56′32″E
- Country: Iran
- Province: Tehran
- County: Robat Karim
- District: Central
- Established as a city: 2013
- Elevation: 1,050 to 1,220 m (3,440 to 4,000 ft)

Population (2016)
  - Total: 97,464
- Time zone: UTC+3:30 (IRST)

Parand (Persian: پرند) is a planned city in the Central District of Robat Karim County, Tehran province, Iran. Its toponym means "natural silk".

== History ==
The city is intended to provide residences for the staff of Imam Khomeini International Airport, and to create a balance in the settlement pattern of Tehran, establish an appropriate environment to draw in the extra population of Tehran and offer an alternative to unsystematic settlements. Parand is expected to accommodate 483,000 people on 3,420 hectares of land.

The plan was a well-planned city which responds to the community's needs. It aims to host low-income families (laborers’ and employees’ housing cooperatives) by providing low-priced residential units with bank loans thereby attracting various classes of people. In 2019, the city has not yet attained those goals.

On 8 January 2020 Ukraine International Airlines Flight 752 crashed approximately 15 kilometres north-east of the city shortly after takeoff from nearby Tehran Imam Khomeini International Airport, killing all 176 people on board. A video of a missile hitting the plane was recorded from the city.

In 2023, it was estimated that Parand will have 11 phases in the future, six of which are operating.

== Demographics ==
=== Population ===
At the time of the 2016 National Census, the city's population was 97,464 in 31,693 households.

== Geography ==
The city of Parand is 10 km west from the city of Robat Karim (35 km southwest from Tehran) on the way to Saveh. It has about 13,000 students in Islamic Azad University of Parand. The city is also accessible from Tehran Imam Khomeini International Airport via the Tehran-Qom freeway.

The city is divided into a number of areas, namely an urban texture, greenery, town services, regional services, and an industrial district.

== See also ==
Media related to Parand at Wikimedia Commons
