= Shahrestanak, Tehran =

Village in Tehran province, Iran

Shahrestanak Persian: شهرستانک
- Village
- Location within Iran
- Coordinates: 35°28′07″N 51°10′46″E
- Country: Iran
- Province: Tehran
- County: Robat Karim
- District: Central
- Rural District: Vahnabad

Population (2016)
  - Total: 556
- Time zone: UTC+3:30 (IRST)

Shahrestanak (Persian: شهرستانک) (Note: Also romanized as Shahrestānak; also known as Shahrestān) is a village in Vahnabad Rural District of the Central District in Robat Karim County, Tehran province, Iran.

== Demographics ==
=== Population ===
At the time of the 2006 National Census, the village's population was 315 in 76 households. The following census in 2011 counted 547 people in 159 households. The 2016 census measured the population of the village as 556 people in 145 households.
