= Peyghambar =

Village in Tehran province, Iran

Peyghambar Persian: پيغمبر
- Village
- Location within Iran
- Coordinates: 35°32′27″N 51°02′39″E
- Country: Iran
- Province: Tehran
- County: Robat Karim
- District: Central
- Rural District: Manjilabad

Population (2016)
  - Total: 1,980
- Time zone: UTC+3:30 (IRST)

Peyghambar (Persian: پيغمبر) (Note: Also romanized as Peyghambar; also known as Moḩammadābād-e Peyghambar and Moḩammadābād) is a village in Manjilabad Rural District of the Central District in Robat Karim County, Tehran province, Iran.

== Demographics ==
=== Population ===
At the time of the 2006 National Census, the village's population was 1,661 in 414 households. The following census in 2011 counted 2,010 people in 570 households. The 2016 census measured the population of the village as 1,980 people in 577 households.
