= Anjemabad =

Village in Tehran province, Iran

Anjemabad Persian: انجم اباد
- Village
- Location within Iran
- Coordinates: 35°33′14″N 51°00′47″E
- Country: Iran
- Province: Tehran
- County: Robat Karim
- District: Central
- Rural District: Manjilabad

Population (2016)
  - Total: 3,972
- Time zone: UTC+3:30 (IRST)

Anjemabad (Persian: انجم اباد) (Note: Also romanized as Anjemābād; also known as Elvīz) is a village in Manjilabad Rural District of the Central District in Robat Karim County, Tehran province, Iran.

== Demographics ==
=== Population ===
At the time of the 2006 National Census, the village's population was 4,850 in 1,258 households. The following census in 2011 counted 4,917 people in 1,441 households. The 2016 census measured the population of the village as 3,972 people in 1,277 households.
