= Hesar Mehtar, Robat Karim =

Village in Tehran province, Iran

Hesar Mehtar Persian: حصارمهتر
- Village
- Location within Iran
- Coordinates: 35°31′25″N 51°02′27″E
- Country: Iran
- Province: Tehran
- County: Robat Karim
- District: Central
- Rural District: Manjilabad

Population (2016)
  - Total: 802
- Time zone: UTC+3:30 (IRST)

Hesar Mehtar (Persian: حصارمهتر) (Note: Also romanized as Ḩeşār Mehtar) is a village in Manjilabad Rural District of the Central District in Robat Karim County, Tehran province, Iran.

== Demographics ==
=== Population ===
At the time of the 2006 National Census, the village's population was 865 in 240 households. The following census in 2011 counted 862 people in 256 households. The 2016 census measured the population of the village as 802 people in 238 households.
