= Deh Hasan, Tehran =

Village in Tehran province, Iran

Deh Hasan Persian: ده حسن
- Village
- Location within Iran
- Coordinates: 35°30′53″N 51°06′31″E
- Country: Iran
- Province: Tehran
- County: Robat Karim
- District: Central
- Rural District: Emamzadeh Abu Taleb

Population (2016)
  - Total: 1,312
- Time zone: UTC+3:30 (IRST)

Deh Hasan (Persian: ده حسن) (Note: Also romanized as Deh Ḩasan) is a village in Emamzadeh Abu Taleb Rural District of the Central District in Robat Karim County, Tehran province, Iran.

== Demographics ==
=== Population ===
At the time of the 2006 National Census, the village's population was 1,153 in 293 households. The following census in 2011 counted 1,186 people in 318 households. The 2016 census measured the population of the village as 1,312 people in 361 households.
