= Asgharabad, Tehran =

Village in Tehran province, Iran

Asgharabad Persian: اصغراباد
- Village
- Location within Iran
- Coordinates: 35°30′07″N 51°04′59″E
- Country: Iran
- Province: Tehran
- County: Robat Karim
- District: Central
- Rural District: Manjilabad

Population (2016)
  - Total: 997
- Time zone: UTC+3:30 (IRST)

Asgharabad (Persian: اصغراباد) (Note: Also romanized as Aşgharābād) is a village in Manjilabad Rural District of the Central District in Robat Karim County, Tehran province, Iran.

== Demographics ==
=== Population ===
At the time of the 2006 National Census, the village's population was 509 in 124 households. The following census in 2011 counted 699 people in 187 households. The 2016 census measured the population of the village as 997 people in 288 households.
