= Alard, Iran =

Village in Tehran province, Iran

Alard Persian: الارد
- Village
- Location within Iran
- Coordinates: 35°30′48″N 51°03′33″E
- Country: Iran
- Province: Tehran
- County: Robat Karim
- District: Central
- Rural District: Manjilabad

Population (2016)
  - Total: 11,616
- Time zone: UTC+3:30 (IRST)

Alard (Persian: الارد) (Note: Also romanized as Ālārd and Alārd; also known as Alārd-e Chahār Dāng) is a village in Manjilabad Rural District of the Central District in Robat Karim County, Tehran province, Iran.

== Demographics ==
=== Population ===
At the time of the 2006 National Census, the village's population was 10,619 in 2,587 households. The following census in 2011 counted 11,800 people in 3,200 households. The 2016 census measured the population of the village as 11,616 people in 3,351 households. It was the most populous village in its rural district.
