= Sefidar =

Sefidar or Safidar (Persian: سفيدار) may refer to:

- Safidar, Chaharmahal and Bakhtiari
- Sefidar, Baft, Kerman Province
- Sefidar, Kohgiluyeh and Boyer-Ahmad
- Sefidar, Tehran
- Sefidar Rural District, in Fars Province

== See also ==
- Sefiddar, Qazvin Province
