= Keygavar =

Village in Tehran province, Iran

Keygavar Persian: كيگاور
- Village
- Location within Iran
- Coordinates: 35°31′26″N 51°04′20″E
- Country: Iran
- Province: Tehran
- County: Robat Karim
- District: Central
- Rural District: Manjilabad

Population (2016)
  - Total: 3,667
- Time zone: UTC+3:30 (IRST)

Keygavar (Persian: كيگاور) (Note: Also romanized as Keygāvar; also known as Keykāvar, Kīkāvar, and Kīkāvor) is a village in Manjilabad Rural District of the Central District in Robat Karim County, Tehran province, Iran.

== Demographics ==
=== Population ===
At the time of the 2006 National Census, the village's population was 4,201 in 1,042 households. The following census in 2011 counted 4,205 people in 1,176 households. The 2016 census measured the population of the village as 3,667 people in 1,059 households.
