= Hakimabad, Tehran =

Village in Tehran province, Iran

Hakimabad Persian: حكيم اباد
- Village
- Location within Iran
- Coordinates: 35°26′53″N 51°12′19″E
- Country: Iran
- Province: Tehran
- County: Robat Karim
- District: Central
- Rural District: Vahnabad

Population (2016)
  - Total: 200
- Time zone: UTC+3:30 (IRST)

Hakimabad (Persian: حكيم اباد) (Note: Also romanized as Ḩakīmābād) is a village in Vahnabad Rural District of the Central District in Robat Karim County, Tehran province, Iran.

== Demographics ==
=== Population ===
At the time of the 2006 National Census, the village's population was 129 in 36 households. The following census in 2011 counted 158 people in 48 households. The 2016 census measured the population of the village as 200 people in 58 households.
