= Parandak, Tehran =

Village in Tehran province, Iran

Parandak Persian: پرندک
- Village
- Location within Iran
- Coordinates: 35°29′41″N 51°02′33″E
- Country: Iran
- Province: Tehran
- County: Robat Karim
- District: Central
- Rural District: Manjilabad

Population (2016)
  - Total: 5,038
- Time zone: UTC+3:30 (IRST)

Parandak (Persian: پرندک) (Note: Also known as Shahrak-e Parandak) is a village in Manjilabad Rural District of the Central District in Robat Karim County, Tehran province, Iran.

== Demographics ==
=== Population ===
At the time of the 2006 National Census, the village's population was 4,613 in 1,088 households. The following census in 2011 counted 5,390 people in 1,417 households. The 2016 census measured the population of the village as 5,038 people in 1,440 households.

== See also ==
- 23rd Takavar Division, ground forces of the Army of the Islamic Republic of Iran based at Parandak garrison
