= Operation Ghader =

1985 Iran–Iraq War operation

- Part of Iran–Iraq War
Date	15 July to 9 September 1985
Location	Erbil Governorate, Iraq
Result	Iran's victory and capture of parts of Erbil by Iran

Belligerents
Iraq	Iran

Commanders and leaders
(Iraq) Saddam Hussein (Iraq) Maher Abdul Rashid	(Iran) Ali Sayad Shirazi (Iran) Mohsen Rezaee

Units involved
Iraqi Ground Forces; Iraqi Air Force	Islamic Republic of Iran Army Ground Forces; Islamic Revolutionary Guard Corps; Islamic Republic of Iran Air Force

Operation Ghader was an offensive operation during the Iran-Iraq War, conducted in three stages from 15 July to 9 September 1985, in Iraq's Erbil Governorate. The operation was conducted by the Islamic Republic of Iran Army Ground Forces and the Islamic Revolutionary Guard Corps, with significant involvement from the Islamic Republic of Iran Air Force and Islamic Republic of Iran Army Aviation, against the Iraqi Armed Forces.

== History ==
During Operation Badr in March 1985, Iranian forces operating in the Hawizeh Marshes region crossed the Tigris River and temporarily captured a section of the Baghdad-Basra highway. The operation failed to achieve its objective of severing the highway, as a large-scale Iraqi counteroffensive employing chemical weapons, artillery, and elite units forced the Iranian forces to withdraw. Subsequently, planning for Operation Ghader, an offensive in northern Iraq, was initiated by the Iranian Armed Forces, and logistical measures commenced.

== Objectives ==
Operation Badr was the last major offensive of the Iran-Iraq War planned under a fully integrated joint command structure between the Islamic Revolutionary Guard Corps (IRGC) and the Islamic Republic of Iran Army. Following this operation, a new policy was established, meaning each organization would independently plan and command its own offensives.

The first major operation under this new framework was Operation Ghader, which was planned and commanded by the Army's Ground Forces under Ali Sayad Shirazi. While the planning was an independent Army initiative, the operation was executed with the participation of IRGC units. It was launched from Iran's Oshnavieh region into the Sidekan region of Iraq's Erbil Governorate. The operation's objectives were to seize strategic heights, destroy Iraqi forces, capture a portion of Iraqi territory, approach the Iraqi army's main communication lines, and cut the supply routes of Iranian Kurdish opposition groups based in Iraq.

Conducted from July to September 1985, the two-month operation was implemented in three stages: Ghader 1, 2 and 3. Its primary tactical goal was to capture the heights overlooking the Sidekan area, thereby establishing military control over the region.

== Design and implementation ==
The Ghader operation was planned and conducted in three stages. The first stage began on 24 July 1985, as a joint operation by the Islamic Republic of Iran Army and the Islamic Revolutionary Guard Corps. It was controlled by the Hamzeh base and commanded by Ali Sayad Shirazi, then the commander of the Iranian Army's Ground Forces. The operation took place in the Sidekan region, 35 kilometers inside Iraqi territory, and ended on 30 July 1985, after achieving limited objectives.

The second stage of the Ghader operation began on 9 September 1985, on a larger scale than the first, following additional preparations, reinforcement, and reconnaissance. For this stage, the Hamzeh base organized the combined Army and IRGC units into six sub-bases, designated "Hamzeh 1" through "Hamzeh 6." These forces were supported by the Islamic Republic of Iran Army Aviation and the Islamic Republic of Iran Air Force. Because the operation was conducted in difficult mountainous terrain, air units were significant in supporting the ground forces; for example, the attack by the Hamzeh 4 sub-base was conducted as an airborne operation.

== Summary of the battle ==
At 2:00 a.m. on 15 July 1985, Iranian forces commenced Operation Ghader, breaching the defense lines of the Iraqi Ground Forces. The advance proceeded from the west of the city of Oshnavieh, Iran, to the heights of the Kalashin region in Iraq's Erbil Governorate.

While initial objectives were met in the operation's early stages, heavy Iraqi counterattacks prevented the achievement of its ultimate goals. The operation concluded on 9 September 1985, with its successes limited to inflicting partial losses on Iraqi forces and equipment. Colonel Hassan Abshenasan, the commander of the 23rd Commando Division of the Islamic Republic of Iran Army Ground Forces, was killed on 30 September, 1985.

Despite the operation's strategic shortcomings, Iranian forces captured the heights in the Hesar Doost, Barbazin, Kargezin, Lolan, Gardeshvan, and Bashkin areas. This advance penetrated up to 35 kilometers into Iraqi territory and secured large areas of Sidekan and Diana.

== Operation results ==
Reports on the results of Operation Ghader contain conflicting information. According to one Iranian claim, Iraqi casualties included approximately 2,000 killed, 3,000 wounded, and 30 captured. A separate report cites a total of 1,020 Iraqi personnel killed and wounded. The same sources claimed the loss of three Iraqi infantry and commando battalions from the 5th Corps.

Reported Iraqi equipment losses included six fighter planes, three helicopters, 22 tanks, 25 artillery pieces, and 274 light and heavy vehicles, which were claimed to have been destroyed by Iranian forces. During the operation, Iranian forces captured the Sarsepandar, Kolahzardeh, and Barbarzindoost heights, but later retreated from these positions.

== See also ==
- List of extensive Iranian ground operations in the Iran-Iraq war
- Operation Tyre
- Office of Literature and Art of Resistance
