= Parandak =

Parandak may refer to:

- Parandak, Markazi, a city in Markazi Province, Iran
- Parandak, Tehran, a village in Tehran Province, Iran
