= Tehran International Airport =

Tehran International Airport can refer to either of the following airports in Tehran, Iran:

- Imam Khomeini International Airport, the city's main international airport
- Mehrabad International Airport, the city's secondary airport, used primarily for domestic flights
