= Vahnabad =

Village in Tehran province, Iran

Vahnabad Persian: وهن اباد
- Village
- Location within Iran
- Coordinates: 35°26′46″N 51°10′21″E
- Country: Iran
- Province: Tehran
- County: Robat Karim
- District: Central
- Rural District: Vahnabad

Population (2016)
  - Total: 1,541
- Time zone: UTC+3:30 (IRST)

Vahnabad (Persian: وهن اباد) (Note: Also romanized as Vahanābād and Vahnābād; also known as Wahsanābād) is a village in, and the capital of, Vahnabad Rural District in the Central District of Robat Karim County, Tehran province, Iran.

== Demographics ==
=== Population ===
At the time of the 2006 National Census, the village's population was 1,344 in 325 households. The following census in 2011 counted 1,537 people in 424 households. The 2016 census measured the population of the village as 1,541 people in 440 households.

== Notable people ==
Heydar Latifiyan was one of the leading figures of the Iranian Constitutional Revolution and a supporter of the parliamentary government against the authoritarian government.

He was a resident of Vahanabad and a supporter of Hassan Modarres and fighters against the Russian invasion during World War I. Haidar was the eldest son of Latif Vahanabadi, and all the Latifiyans of this region are Latif descendants. His famous descendants is Ali Latifiyan

After World War I, the Russians advanced on Qazvin. With the fall of Tehran, the parliament lost its majority and was dissolved when, in the early year of World War I, around 1293, Russia issued an ultimatum to Iran to expel Morgan Schuster and the forces They entered Iran and came to Robat Karim and attacked the forces of the National Defense Committee, which was formed in the presence of Seyyed Hassan Modarres and his allies. "My Memoirs" writes about the first Russian military confrontation with the national forces:

The Russian army reaches the village of Kalmeh (Fajr town), which is located on the road from Robat Karim to Tehran, on one side, and the local fighters are surrounded on three sides. But everyone survives. But at dusk, the infantry of the Russian army get closer and the battle begins with the sword, and after a bloody battle, 70 people are killed. Haidar Latifian, like the rest of his comrades, was killed.

According to local legends, the Russians made it difficult to identify the bodies by cutting off the heads of the dead. He is buried in the northern side of the Imamzadeh grave.
