= Imam Khomeini International Airport =

International airport serving Tehran, Iran

Tehran Imam Khomeini International Airport فرودگاه بین‌المللی امام خمینی

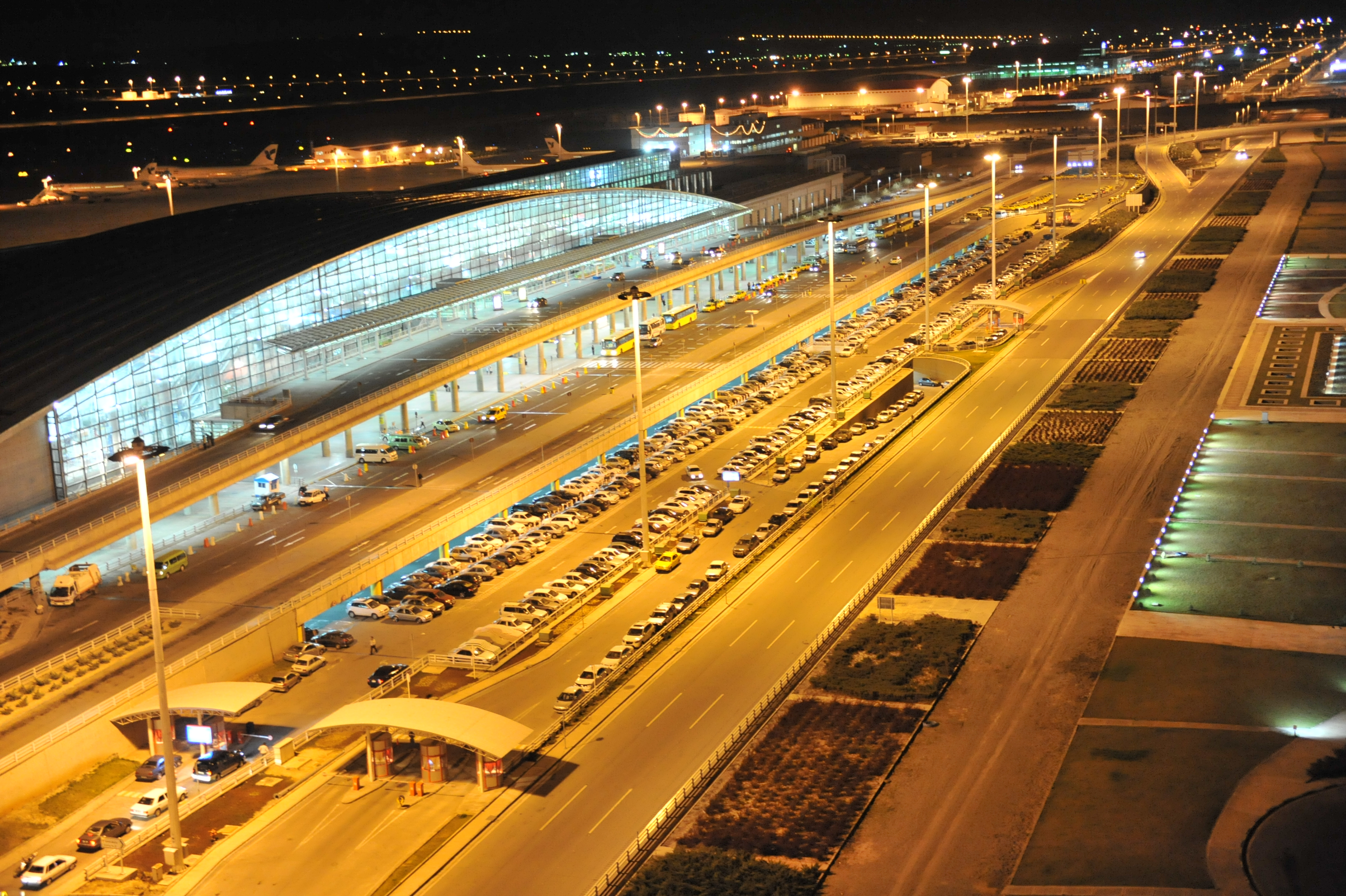
- IATA: IKA; ICAO: OIIE

Summary
- Airport type: Public
- Owner: Government of Iran
- Operator: Imam Khomeini Airport City Company
- Serves: Tehran metropolitan area
- Location: Vahnabad, Tehran Province, Iran
- Opened: 30 April 2005; 21 years ago
- Hub for: ATA Airlines; Caspian Airlines; Iran Air; Iran Airtour; Iran Aseman Airlines; Mahan Air; Meraj Airlines; Qeshm Air; Sepehran Airlines; Taban Air; Varesh Airlines; Zagros Airlines
- Time zone: IRST (UTC+3:30)
- Elevation AMSL: 1,007 m (3,304 ft)
- Coordinates: 35°24′58″N 051°09′08″E
- Website: ikac.ir

Maps
- Location of airport in Iran
- Interactive map of Tehran Imam Khomeini International Airport

Runways
Direction	Length		Surface
Direction	m	ft	Surface
11L/29R	4,198	13,773	Asphalt/Concrete
11R/29L	4,092	13,425	Asphalt/Concrete

Statistics (21 March 2018–20 March 2019)
- Aircraft movements: 47,000
- Passengers: 7,270,000
- Cargo (t): 142,000

Tehran Imam Khomeini International Airport (IATA: IKA, ICAO: OIIE) (Persian: فرودگاه بین‌المللی امام خمینی) is the international airport of Tehran, the capital of Iran. It is located 2 kilometers (1 mi) from Vahnabad and 35 kilometres (22 miles) southwest of Tehran and is named after Ruhollah Khomeini (1900–1989), Iran's first supreme leader. The airport is operated by Imam Khomeini Airport City Company. It covers 13,400 hectares (33,000 acres) and has two terminals and two runways. All international flights into Tehran are served by the airport, and all domestic flights land at Mehrabad Airport. Imam Khomeini Airport is a hub for multiple airlines. As of the fiscal year ending on 20 March 2019, it ranked third in terms of passenger traffic in Iran.

The airport was conceived before the 1979 Iranian Revolution, as Mehrabad Airport was becoming congested. It was scheduled to open in May 2004 under the management of Tepe-Akfen-Vie (TAV), a Turkish-Austrian consortium. However, the Islamic Revolutionary Guard Corps shut it down soon after the first plane landed, citing security fears over allowing foreigners to run the airport. Conservatives in parliament said that TAV had business ties with Iran's enemy, Israel. The company stated it had no relationship with the country. The airport reopened in April 2005 with four Iranian carriers in charge of operations. In 2019, a second terminal was completed.

== Geography ==
The airport city is located at the end of Robat Karim and Ray counties in Tehran province and under Vahnabad Rural District (formerly a part of it). During the construction of this airport, the southern village of Nodeh was integrated into the airport as a whole from the entire Vahnabad Rural District.

A large part of the land north of the airport (now under the northern belt of the airport city) consists of the land donated by local residents Hasan Latifiyan and his wife Zahra Abdullahi for the construction and expansion of the airport (before the creation of the airport city). Part of the CNS equipment of the airport city, such as the special ILS approach and the right runway 29 (29R) as the main landing strip for foreign planes and the side taxiway, are located in this area.

== History ==
=== Construction and initial opening ===
The Iranian government decided prior to the 1979 Iranian Revolution to build a new airport for Tehran. The city was then the centre of the Middle East, and air traffic was increasing quickly at the existing Mehrabad Airport. The new airport was initially called Tehran or Aryamehr International Airport, and the original designers were the American company Tippetts-Abbett-McCarthy-Stratton and the Iranian firm Farman-Farmayan. In 1977, construction began 35 kilometres (22 mi) southwest of Tehran. The revolution and the Iran–Iraq War caused delays, and work on the runway recommenced in 1989. Due to the economic impact of the war and Iran's isolation in the international community, President Akbar Rafsanjani focused on other endeavours in the early 1990s. In 1995, the French firm Aéroports de Paris was selected as the primary consultant, and construction of the terminal, which Paul Andreu had redesigned, started. By 2000, the airport had been renamed after Ruhollah Khomeini, the founder of the Islamic Republic of Iran.

In 2003, Tepe-Akfen-Vie (TAV), a Turkish-Austrian consortium, reached an agreement with the reformist administration of Mohammad Khatami to operate the terminal and construct a second one. It made an initial investment of US$15 million in the project. The deal symbolised a shift away from the viewpoint in the government that foreign investment was a form of imperialism. President Khatami inaugurated the airport on 1 February 2004 during celebrations marking the 25th anniversary of the revolution. The plan was for it to handle all international flights to Tehran. Officials wanted the airport to represent Iran's opening to the international community and hoped it would become the largest in the Middle East. The Economist Intelligence Unit commented that the Dubai airport already served as a hub in the region and that the new airport was unlikely to overcome existing barriers to tourism such as the government's rigid social rules.

Some Iranians including the directors of two airlines objected to the deal with TAV. Their primary concern was that Turkey had links to Iran's foe Israel. On 7 May 2004, the military forced TAV's staff to leave the premises with their equipment and granted management of the facility to Iran Air. The following day, an Emirates flight from Dubai became the first to land. Hours later, however, the Islamic Revolutionary Guard Corps closed the airport by driving tanks onto the runway. It threatened to use anti-aircraft fire against the second incoming flight, which fighter jets escorted to Isfahan. The rest of the flights were diverted to Mehrabad. The guards said it was unsafe and an affront to national dignity for foreigners to be in charge of the largest airport in Iran. Conservatives in parliament stated that the consortium had done business with Israel. TAV responded that it had no association with the country.

Later that year, the conservative-dominated parliament impeached Khatami's minister of transportation, Ahmad Khorram, partly because of the TAV contract. It also granted itself the right to veto the deal and another one that the government had signed with a Turkish firm. The agreement with TAV was ultimately annulled. The incident soured relations between Iran and Turkey. According to Ray Takeyh, a fellow at the Council on Foreign Relations, the likely reason for the closure was that "the local interest, particularly Revolutionary Guards, desired a greater share of the profits". The Guardian and The Washington Post made similar comments. The latter also described the airport as a symbol of the divide between those Iranians who wanted to engage more with the world and those who did not.

=== Second opening ===
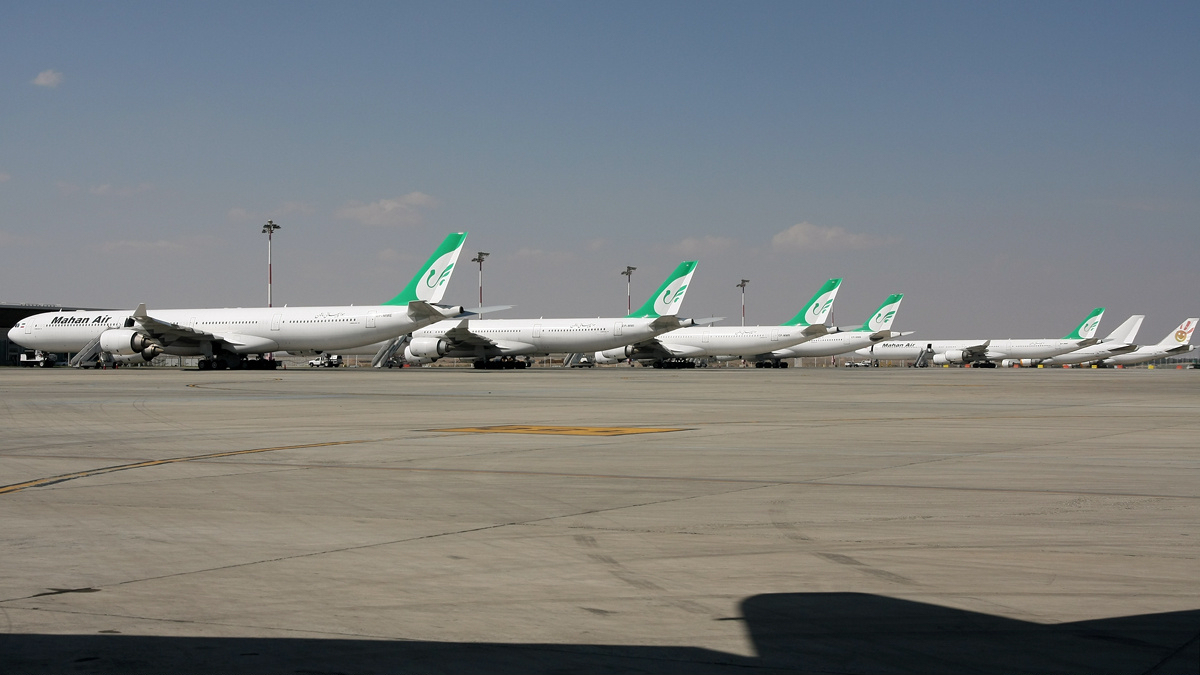
Mahan Air Airbus A340s parked at Imam Khomeini Airport in 2016

On 30 April 2005, the $350 million Imam Khomeini Airport reopened under the management of a consortium of four Iranian airlines—Caspian Airlines, Iran Aseman Airlines, Kish Air and Mahan Air. No ceremony was held to mark the occasion due to persistent tensions. The first arrival was an Iran Air flight from Dubai. In the beginning, the airport only had flights to a few Middle Eastern countries. By March 2008, all international flights excluding those for the Hajj and Umrah had relocated from Mehrabad to Imam Khomeini Airport. The airport also signed an agreement in 2016 with Milan-based Italian firm SEA to manage the airport's handling activities.

Air France, Alitalia, British Airways and KLM resumed service to Tehran in 2016 following the Iran nuclear deal. Thai Airways commenced service to Iran as well. All five carriers suspended their flights two years later, stating that they were not financially viable. Analysts said the main reason for the airlines' decisions was that the United States had exited the nuclear agreement and decided to reinstate sanctions on Iran. In June 2019, President Hassan Rouhani inaugurated the Salaam International Terminal.

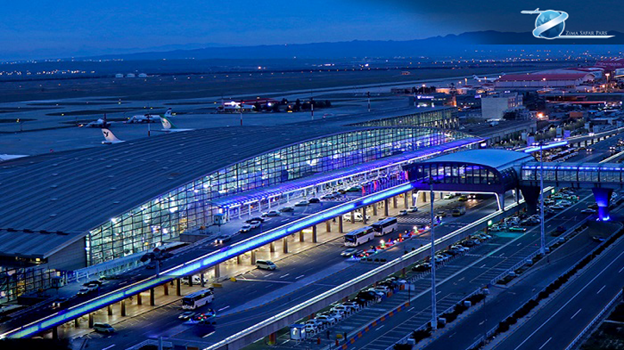
Terminal 1

== Infrastructure ==
The airport occupies 13,400 hectares (33,000 acres) and is operated by Imam Khomeini Airport City Company, which is part of the Ministry of Roads and Urban Development. It has two terminals: Terminal 1 and the Salaam International Terminal. Terminal 1 is shaped like an arc whose ends merge into the desert horizon. A third terminal called Iranshahr is in the planning phase. There are two runways:

- 11L/29R: 4,198 by 45 metres (13,773 ft × 148 ft)
- 11R/29L: 4,092 by 45 metres (13,425 ft × 148 ft)

The first 450 metres (1,480 ft) of 11L/29R are made of concrete, the rest of asphalt. 11R/29L is entirely made of asphalt. An instrument landing system was installed in August 2009.

In 2015, French corporation AccorHotels opened a Novotel and an Ibis hotel on the airport premises, marking the entry of the first international hotel chain into the Iranian market since the 1979 revolution. The company was motivated by the Joint Comprehensive Plan of Action. Rexan International Airport Hotels has since taken over management of the hotels and renamed them Rexan and Remis, respectively.

== Statistics ==
=== Annual traffic ===
Traffic by calendar year
Year	Passengers	Change from previous year
2005	1,013,745	
2006	1,382,075	▲36.33%
2007	2,173,661	▲57.28%
2008	3,798,905	▲74.77%
2009	4,030,859	▲6.11%
2010	4,611,943	▲14.42%
2011	4,730,619	▲2.57%
2012	4,446,356	▼6.01%
2013	4,846,181	▲8.99%
2014	6,155,829	▲27.02%
2015	6,883,960	▲11.83%
2016	7,439,643	▲8.07%
2017	8,512,209	▲14.42%
2018	6,843,259	▼19.61%
2019	6,037,280	▼11.78%
2020	912,605	▼84.88%
2021	4,005,076	▲338.86%
2022	6,301,398	▲57.34%
2023	7,429,391	▲17.90%
2024	7,672,152	▲3.27%
Source: Air-transport annual reports of Iran

== Airlines and destinations ==
As of March 2026, all flights have been suspended due to the Iran war.

Most of the airlines that fly into Imam Khomeini Airport are based in Turkey and the Middle East. The airport is served by two Western airlines, Lufthansa and Austrian Airlines. It is a hub for Iran Air, Iran Aseman Airlines, Mahan Air and Meraj Airlines. Imam Khomeini Airport receives all international flights to Tehran, while Mehrabad Airport caters to domestic traffic. There are flights to several cities in the Middle East and the rest of Asia such as Damascus, Guangzhou and Mumbai. Tehran is also linked to destinations in Europe like Frankfurt and Moscow. In the fiscal year ending on 20 March 2019, the airport handled 7.27 million passengers, making it the third busiest in Iran. It received 142,000 tonnes of cargo, and the number of aircraft movements was 47,000.

=== Passenger ===
Airlines	Destinations
Aeroflot	Moscow–Sheremetyevo
Air Arabia	Sharjah
Armenia Airways	Yerevan
ATA Airlines	Kuwait City, Najaf (suspended)
Austrian Airlines	Vienna (temporarily suspended)
Caspian Airlines	Baghdad (suspended), Najaf (suspended), Yerevan
China Southern Airlines	Beijing–Daxing, Ürümqi
Emirates	Dubai–International (temporarily suspended)
Flydubai	Dubai–International (temporarily suspended)
Iran Air	Baku, Dubai–International, Mumbai, Najaf (suspended); Seasonal: Jeddah, Medina
Iran Airtour	Baku, Dubai–International, Islamabad, Kabul, Kuala Lumpur–International
Iran Aseman Airlines	Baghdad, Najaf, Tbilisi (all flights suspended)
Iraqi Airways	Baghdad, Najaf
Jazeera Airways	Kuwait City
Kuwait Airways	Kuwait City
Lufthansa	Frankfurt (temporarily suspended)
Mahan Air	Baghdad (suspended), Beijing–Capital, Delhi, Dubai–International, Erbil (suspended), Grozny, Guangzhou, Islamabad, Kabul, Lahore, Moscow–Sheremetyevo, Phuket, Shanghai–Pudong, Shenzhen, Sulaimaniyah (suspended)
Meraj Airlines	Baghdad (suspended), Mazar-i-Sharif, Najaf (suspended)
Qatar Airways	Doha
Qeshm Air	Almaty, Baghdad (suspended), Dubai–International, Muscat, Najaf (suspended), Tbilisi (suspended), Yerevan
SalamAir	Muscat
Sepehran Airlines	Baghdad (suspended), Dubai–International, Muscat, Tbilisi (suspended), Yerevan
Somon Air	Dushanbe
Taban Air	Baghdad (suspended), Karachi, Muscat, Najaf (suspended)
Varesh Airlines	Batumi (suspended), Dushanbe, Kabul, Muscat, Najaf (suspended)
Zagros Airlines	Najaf (suspended), Tashkent

=== Cargo ===
Airlines	Destinations
Lufthansa Cargo	Frankfurt
Qatar Airways Cargo	Doha, Hong Kong
Turkish Cargo	Hanoi, Istanbul

== Ground transportation ==
Imam Khomeini International Airport is accessible from Tehran via the Tehran–Qom and Tehran–Saveh freeways. It is also served by a station on Line 1 of the Tehran Metro, which opened in August 2017.

== Accidents and incidents ==
- On 15 July 2009, Caspian Airlines Flight 7908, a Tupolev Tu-154 bound for Yerevan, Armenia, crashed in Qazvin province 16 minutes after take-off from Imam Khomeini International Airport. All 168 passengers and crew were killed.
- On 8 January 2020, Ukraine International Airlines Flight 752 was shot down by the Islamic Revolutionary Guard Corps shortly after takeoff from the airport, killing all 176 people on board.
- On 26 October 2024, the airport was hit by precision military airstrikes launched by Israel in retaliation to recent ballistic missile attacks.

== See also ==
- List of airports in Iran
