= Esmailabad Rural District =

Esmailabad Rural District (Persian: دهستان اسماعيل آباد) may refer to:

- Esmailabad Rural District (Khash County), Sistan and Baluchestan province
- Esmailabad Rural District (Baharestan County), Tehran province
