= Sefidar, Tehran =

Village in Tehran province, Iran

Sefidar Persian: سفيدار
- Village
- Location within Iran
- Country: Iran
- Province: Tehran
- County: Robat Karim
- District: Central
- Rural District: Manjilabad

Population (2016)
  - Total: 6,529
- Time zone: UTC+3:30 (IRST)

Sefidar (Persian: سفيدار) (Note: Also romanized as Sefīdār) is a village in Manjilabad Rural District of the Central District in Robat Karim County, Tehran province, Iran.

== Demographics ==
=== Population ===
At the time of the 2006 National Census, the village's population was 4,701 in 1,157 households. The following census in 2011 counted 5,388 people in 1,486 households. The 2016 census measured the population of the village as 6,529 people in 1,888 households.
