= Iranian peacekeeping missions =

Peacekeeping Unit
- Active: 1963–1979; 1993–2020
- Country: Iran
- Branch: Iranian Army
- Role: Peacekeeping
- Part of: 23rd Takavar Division
- Nickname: "The Blue Berets"
- Colors: Blue
- Missions: ONUC (1963); ICCS (1973–1975); UNDOF (1975–1978); UNIFIL (1978–1979); UNMEE (2003–2008); UNMIS (2009–2010); UNAMID (2012–2020)

The Peacekeeping Unit (Persian: یگان حافظ صلح) is a battalion of the Iranian Army tasked with peacekeeping missions overseas and assigning personnel contributed by Iran to the United Nations peacekeeping.

== History ==
=== 20th century ===
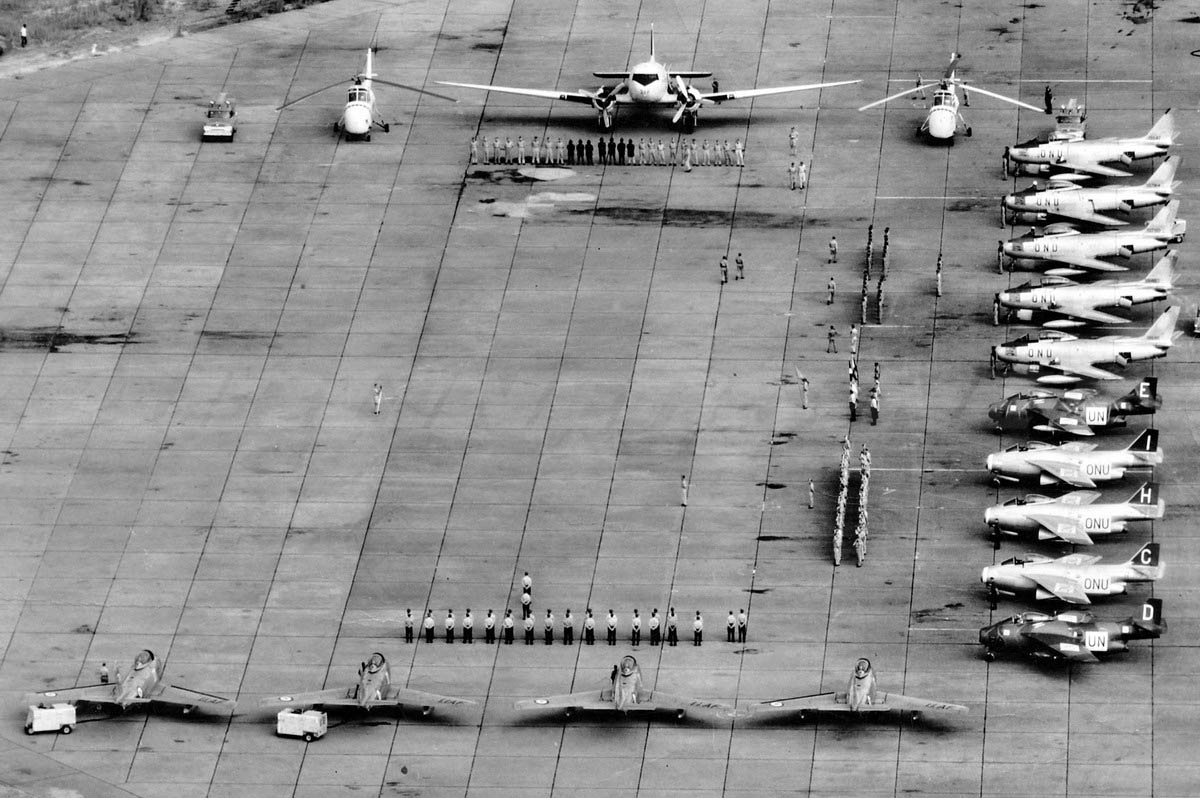
In January 1963, Iran sent four F-86 aircraft for United Nations Operation in the Congo (ONUC), as seen below of the photo

Iranian forces were present in the Republic of the Congo, as part of the United Nations Operation in the Congo.

On 26 October 1973, the Iranian contingent arrived at Saigon to replace the Canadian counterparts who withdrew from the International Commission of Control and Supervision (ICCS), an international organization formed to monitor cease-fire of the parties in the Vietnam War.

Starting in 1975, Iran contributed 390 infantry personnel to the United Nations Disengagement Observer Force (UNDOF) at Golan Heights to oversee the ceasefire between Israel and Syria, after Peru withdrew its forces. During this mission, Iranian peacekeepers were attacked by Israeli soldiers in November 1977, during which two peacekeepers, Warrant officer A. A Aghei and Private Yadollah Moradpour were killed. Iranians were in the original composition of the United Nations Interim Force in Lebanon (UNIFIL) in 1978, but soon after the Iranian Revolution took place, all Iranian peacekeepers were called back by the interim government in early 1979. Later that year, Finland replaced the Iranian battalion in charge of UNDOF.

The Iran–Iraq War let to abandoning the international peacekeeping missions by Iran, and the UN posted its UNIIMOG forces to monitor the conflict. In 1993, the Iranians reestablished the professional peacekeeping unit and declared that they are ready to be dispatched at the UN's directive.

=== 21st century ===
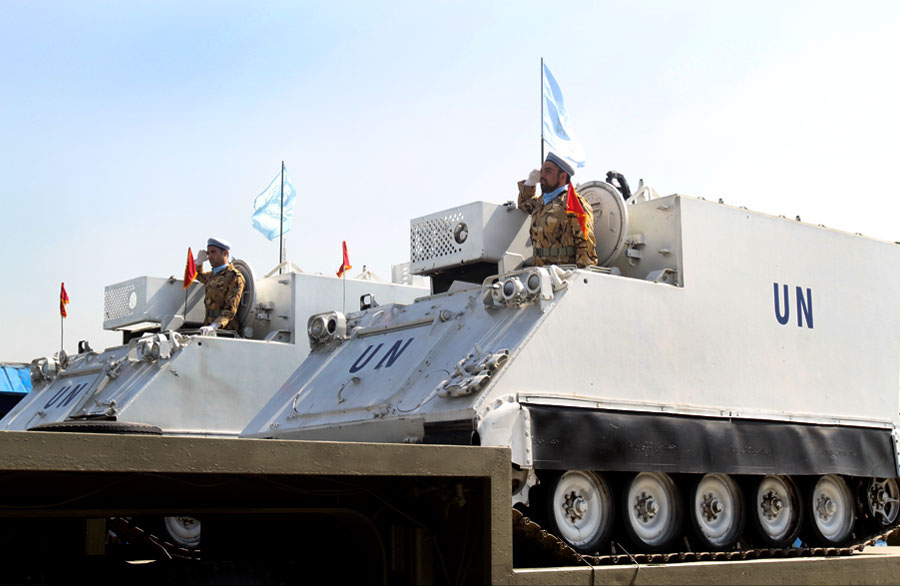
Armored personnel carrier of the Peacekeeping Unit in 2012 parade

The Peacekeeping Unit has had personnel serving in the United Nations Mission in Ethiopia and Eritrea (UNMEE), the United Nations Mission in Sudan (UNMIS) and the African Union-United Nations Hybrid Operation in Darfur (UNAMID), though contribution of few personnel is not considered a meaningful participation. Iran has expressed interest in expanding its support to the UN, for example in February 2018 the Permanent Representative of Iran to the United Nations addressed the Special Committee on Peacekeeping Operations, stating "[m]y Government stands ready to increase its contribution to the peacekeeping operations logistically and militarily, by deploying troop, military observer, police and civilians". An unclassified report published by the U.S. Defense Intelligence Agency in 2019, concluded that participating multilateral initiatives is a potential way to gain more international prestige by Iran.

The table below shows the number of Iranian contributions to the UN annually since 2000, accurate as of June 30 of each year:

Year	Personnel Contributed					Ref
Year	E	S	M	T	Total	Ref
2000	—N/a				0	
2001	—N/a				0	
2002	—N/a				0	
2003	—N/a	—N/a	2	—N/a	2	
2004	—N/a	—N/a	3	—N/a	3	
2005	—N/a	—N/a	3	—N/a	3	
2006	—N/a	—N/a	3	—N/a	3	
2007	—N/a	—N/a	3	—N/a	3	
2008	—N/a	—N/a	1	—N/a	1	
2009	—N/a	—N/a	2	—N/a	2	
2010	2	—N/a	—N/a	—N/a	2	
2011	—N/a				0	
2012	2	—N/a	—N/a	—N/a	2	
2013	2	—N/a	—N/a	—N/a	2	
2014	2	—N/a	—N/a	—N/a	2	
2015	2	—N/a	—N/a	—N/a	2	
2016	4	—N/a	—N/a	—N/a	4	
2017	3	—N/a	—N/a	—N/a	3	
2018	3	1	—N/a	—N/a	4	
2019	1	—N/a	—N/a	—N/a	1	
2020	—N/a	1	—N/a	—N/a	1	
