= Manjilabad Rural District =

Rural district in Tehran province, Iran

Manjilabad Rural District Persian: دهستان منجیل‌آباد
- Rural District
- Location within Iran
- Coordinates: 35°30′N 51°01′E
- Country: Iran
- Province: Tehran
- County: Robat Karim
- District: Central
- Established: 1987
- Capital: Manjilabad

Population (2016)
  - Total: 45,986
- Time zone: UTC+3:30 (IRST)

Manjilabad Rural District (Persian: دهستان منجیل‌آباد) is in the Central District of Robat Karim County, Tehran province, Iran. Its capital is the village of Manjilabad.

== Demographics ==
=== Population ===
At the time of the 2006 National Census, the rural district's population was 48,679 in 12,442 households. There were 77,681 inhabitants in 21,406 households at the following census of 2011. The 2016 census measured the population of the rural district as 45,986 in 13,091 households. The most populous of its 27 villages was Alard, with 11,616 people.

=== Other villages in the rural district ===
- 23rd Takavar Division
- Anjemabad
- Ashgharabad
- Hesar Mehtar
- Hoseynabad-e Yengejeh
- Keygavar
- Parandak
- Peyghambar
- Sefidar
- Shahrabad-e Ilat
- Shahrak-e Yarnedak
- Yeqeh
