= Meymanat Rural District =

Rural district in Tehran province, Iran

Meymanat Rural District Persian: دهستان ميمنت
- Rural District
- Location within Iran
- Coordinates: 35°30′N 51°09′E
- Country: Iran
- Province: Tehran
- County: Baharestan
- District: Golestan
- Established: 1996
- Capital: Meymanatabad

Population (2016)
  - Total: 7,353
- Time zone: UTC+3:30 (IRST)

Meymanat Rural District (Persian: دهستان ميمنت) is in Golestan District of Baharestan County, Tehran province, Iran. Its capital is the village of Meymanatabad. (Note: Formerly Meymanabad) The previous capital of the rural district was the village of Nasirabad, now the city of Nasirshahr.

== Demographics ==
=== Population ===
At the time of the 2006 National Census, the rural district's population (as a part of Robat Karim County) was 7,107 in 1,691 households. There were 8,258 inhabitants in 2,116 households at the following census of 2011, by which time the district had been separated from the county in the establishment of Baharestan County. The 2016 census measured the population of the rural district as 7,353 in 2,043 households. The most populous of its two villages was Meymanatabad, with 5,821 people. The village of Riyeh had a population of 1,532.
