= Emamzadeh Abu Taleb Rural District =

Rural district in Tehran province, Iran

Emamzadeh Abu Taleb Rural District Persian: دهستان امامزاده ابوطالب
- Rural District
- Location within Iran
- Coordinates: 35°32′N 51°07′E
- Country: Iran
- Province: Tehran
- County: Robat Karim
- District: Central
- Established: 1987
- Capital: Adaran

Population (2016)
  - Total: 4,912
- Time zone: UTC+3:30 (IRST)

Emamzadeh Abu Taleb Rural District (Persian: دهستان امامزاده ابوطالب) is in the Central District of Robat Karim County, Tehran province, Iran. Its capital is the village of Adaran.

== Demographics ==
=== Population ===
At the time of the 2006 National Census, the rural district's population was 4,921 in 1,251 households. There were 4,985 inhabitants in 1,363 households at the following census of 2011. The 2016 census measured the population of the rural district as 4,912 in 1,395 households. The most populous of its three villages was Adaran, with 2,322 people.

=== Other villages in the rural district ===
- Deh Hasan
- Kazemabad
