= Salehieh =

City in Kerman province, Iran

Salehieh Persian: صالحیه
- City
- Location within Iran
- Coordinates: 35°30′13″N 51°11′29″E
- Country: Iran
- Province: Tehran
- County: Baharestan
- District: Golestan District
- Established as a city: 2005

Area
  - Total: 5.91 km^{2} (2.28 sq mi)

Population (2016)
  - Total: 58,683
  - Density: 9,930/km^{2} (25,700/sq mi)
- Time zone: UTC+3:30 (IRST)

Salehieh (Persian: صالحیه) (Note: Formerly Salehabad (صالح آباد), also romanized as Şāleḩābād) is a city in Golestan District of Baharestan County, Tehran province, Iran, serving as the administrative center for Salehabad Rural District. The village of Salehabad was converted to a city in 2005 and renamed Salehieh in 2012.

== Demographics ==
=== Population ===
At the time of the 2006 National Census, the city's population was 54,218 in 13,454 households, when it was in Robat Karim County. The following census in 2011 counted 56,356 people in 15,417 households, by which time the district had been separated from the county in the establishment of Baharestan County. The 2016 census measured the population of the city as 58,683 people in 17,372 households.

== See also ==
Media related to Salehiyeh at Wikimedia Commons
