= 23rd Takavar Division =

23rd Ranger Division
- لشگر ۲۳ تکاور
- Country: Iran
- Branch: Ground Force
- Type: Takavar
- Role: Special operations
- Size: 5,000
- Garrison/HQ: Parandak, Tehran province
- Engagements: Kurdish rebellion Iran–Iraq War

Commanders
- Notable commanders: Col. Hassan Abshenasan

23rd Ranger Division (Persian: لشکر ۲۳ تکاور) is a Takavar division of the Ground Forces of Islamic Republic of Iran Army based in Parandak, Tehran province.

During the Iran–Iraq War, the division was mainly engaged in fighting on the Northern front including around Sardasht, West Azerbaijan in order to prevent Iraqi Army forces from concentrating on the Southern front.

== Population ==
The National Census of Iran lists the population of the residential houses of the 23rd Division (خانه هاي مسكوني لشگر23نوحه) (Note: Located in Manjilabad Rural District of the Central District in Robat Karim County) as 5,721 people in 1,576 households in 2006, 6,687 in 1,985 households in 2011, and 5,339 in 1,466 households in 2016. The population of the village of Parandak is listed separately in the census.
