= Salehabad Rural District (Baharestan County) =

Rural district in Tehran province, Iran

Salehabad Rural District Persian: دهستان صالح آباد
- Rural District
- Location within Iran
- Coordinates: 35°29′N 51°11′E
- Country: Iran
- Province: Tehran
- County: Baharestan
- District: Golestan
- Established: 1994
- Capital: Salehieh

Population (2016)
  - Total: 1,134
- Time zone: UTC+3:30 (IRST)

Salehabad Rural District (Persian: دهستان صالح آباد) is in Golestan District of Baharestan County, Tehran province, Iran. It is administered from the city of Salehieh. (Note: Formerly Salehabad)

== Demographics ==
=== Population ===
At the time of the 2006 National Census, the rural district's population (as a part of Robat Karim County) was 722 in 173 households. There were 983 inhabitants in 275 households at the following census of 2011, by which time the district had been separated from the county in the establishment of Baharestan County. The 2016 census measured the population of the rural district as 1,134 in 350 households. Its only village was Emamzadeh Baqer, with 1,134 people.
