= Hassan Abshenasan =

- Born: 9 May 1936; Tehran, Imperial State of Iran
- Died: 30 September 1985 (aged 49); Sarsul Kelashin, Ba'athist Iraq
- Resting place: Behesht-e Zahra Cemetery, Tehran
- Military career
- Allegiance: Iran
- Service years: 1957–1985
- Rank: Colonel
- Commands: 23rd Commando Division
- Conflicts: Iran–Iraq War †

Hassan Abshenasan (Persian: حسن آبشناسان) was an Iranian military officer who commanded the 23rd Commando Division during the Iran-Iraq War and was killed in action in the conflict.

== Biography ==
Hassan Abshenasan was born to a religious family on 1936 in Nazi Abad district of Tehran. He spent his primary school in Tehran and graduated from high school in 1957. Then he entered military university and three years later graduated with Second Lieutenant. Hassan passed primary and advanced of military in Shiraz province and spent special courses in AJA University of Command and Staff, Tehran. Also, he received commando training in Iran and parachute and ranger training in Scotland. Abshenasan was skilled in athletics, volleyball, basketball, table tennis, swimming, horse riding, and judo.

== In Iran-Iraq war ==
Hassan Abshenasan had different roles during Iran-Iraq war, including:

- Commander of Hamzeh Seyes ol-Shohada residence
- Commander of 23rd Special Forces Division
- Commander of residence of northwest of Iran
- Teacher of guerrilla warfare education
- Teacher of Sepah forces who were based in Sa'd-Abad
- Forming Komeil residence in Iraq
- Combining of forces of Islamic Republic of Iran Army and Sepah
- Designing Operation Ghader and implementation it

== Death ==
On 30 September 1985, he was killed in Sarsul Kelashin area in the north of Iraq. He was Commander of Airborne Special Forces at that time. People of Dasht-e Abbas called him lion of wilderness.

== In popular culture ==
=== Book ===
Old Guerilla book is biography of Hassan Abshenasan for young readers to know his life. The book was written by Mozhgan Hazratian Fumm and published by Soureh Sabz Publishing Institute. Author asserted that: "courage, persistence and religious confidence were Abshenasan's outstanding personal traits."

=== Film ===
Documentary film about Hassan Abshenasan's life is producing by Masoud Imami. The film have several interview with his family and his friend during Iran-Iraq war. For showing different angles of his life especially for remaking the scene of fighting in Iran-Iraq war, use computerized simulation.

=== Lion of Wilderness ===
The lion of wilderness was authored by Alireza Por Bozorg that is biography of Abshenasan.

=== The Secret Half-moon ===
The secret Half-moon is Abshenasan's wife narration about Hassan that authored by Marjan Fouladvan.

=== Men of plain of light ===
Men of plain of light is collection of memories of the commanders of Ground Forces of Islamic Republic of Iran Army that authored by Abolfazl Norani.

=== Brighter than blue ===
Brighter than blue was authored by Farzam Shirzadi. This book is written in 11 chapters and 160 pages.

=== Expressway ===
Abshenasan Expressway known as Expressway in northern Tehran. It is named after Hassan Abshenasan, former commander of the 23rd Commando Division who was killed during Iran–Iraq War.
