= Vahnabad Rural District =

Rural district in Tehran province, Iran

Vahnabad Rural District Persian: دهستان وهن آباد
- Rural District
- Location within Iran
- Coordinates: 35°27′N 51°09′E
- Country: Iran
- Province: Tehran
- County: Robat Karim
- District: Central
- Established: 1986
- Capital: Vahnabad

Population (2016)
  - Total: 9,116
- Time zone: UTC+3:30 (IRST)

Vahnabad Rural District (Persian: دهستان وهن آباد) is in the Central District of Robat Karim County, Tehran province, Iran. Its capital is the village of Vahnabad.

== Demographics ==
=== Population ===
At the time of the 2006 National Census, the rural district's population was 5,509 in 1,368 households. There were 8,219 inhabitants in 2,281 households at the following census of 2011. The 2016 census measured the population of the rural district as 9,116 in 2,686 households. The most populous of its six villages was Shotor Khvar, with 5,360 people.

=== Other villages in the rural district ===
- Aliabad
- Hakimabad
- Now Deh
- Shahrestanak
