= Esmailabad Rural District (Baharestan County) =

Rural district in Tehran province, Iran

Esmailabad Rural District Persian: دهستان اسماعيل آباد
- Rural District
- Location within Iran
- Coordinates: 35°33′N 51°09′E
- Country: Iran
- Province: Tehran
- County: Baharestan
- District: Bostan
- Established: 1987

Population (2016)
  - Total: 0
- Time zone: UTC+3:30 (IRST)

Esmailabad Rural District (Persian: دهستان اسماعيل آباد) is in Bostan District of Baharestan County, Tehran province, Iran.

== Demographics ==
=== Population ===
At the time of the 2006 National Census, the rural district's population (as a part of Robat Karim County) was 35 in 10 households. The population at the following census of 2011 was below the reporting threshold, by which time the district had been separated from the county in the establishment of Baharestan County. The 2016 census measured the population of the rural district as zero. Its only village was the Ahmadabad Culture and Technology Complex, with a population of zero.
