= Hamedanak Rural District =

Rural district in Tehran province, Iran

Hamedanak Rural District Persian: دهستان همدانک
- Rural District
- Location within Iran
- Coordinates: 35°32′N 51°09′E
- Country: Iran
- Province: Tehran
- County: Baharestan
- District: Bostan
- Established: 2002
- Capital: Hamedanak

Population (2016)
  - Total: 29,210
- Time zone: UTC+3:30 (IRST)

Hamedanak Rural District (Persian: دهستان همدانک) is in Bostan District of Baharestan County, Tehran province, Iran. Its capital is the village of Hamedanak.

== Demographics ==
=== Population ===
At the time of the 2006 National Census, the rural district's population (as a part of Robat Karim County) was 32,894 in 7,780 households. There were 41,063 inhabitants in 11,124 households at the following census of 2011, by which time the district had been separated from the county in the establishment of Baharestan County. The 2016 census measured the population of the rural district as 29,210 in 8,523 households. The most populous of its three villages was Ovrin, with 17,577 people. Hamedanak and Kheyrabad-e Pain had populations of 11,216 and 417, respectively.
