= Golestan, Tehran =

City in Tehran province, Iran

Golestan Persian: گلستان
- City
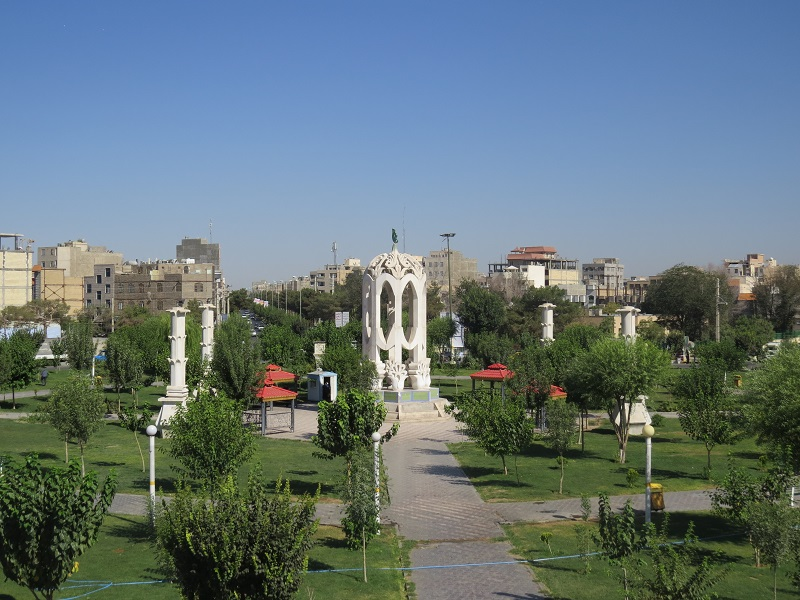

- Location within Iran
- Coordinates: 35°31′03″N 51°10′20″E
- Country: Iran
- Province: Tehran
- County: Baharestan
- District: Golestan
- Established as a city: 1996

Population (2016)
  - Total: 239,556
- Time zone: UTC+3:30 (IRST)

Golestan (Persian: گلستان) (Note: Also romanized as Golestān; formerly the village of Soltanabad) is a city in, and the capital of, Golestan District in Baharestan County, Tehran province, Iran. It also serves, with Nasimshahr, (Note: Formerly known as Akbarabad and then Mohajershahr) as one of the two capitals of the county. The village of Soltanabad was converted to the city of Golestan in 1996.

== Demographics ==
=== Population ===
At the time of the 2006 National Census, the city's population was 231,882 in 57,216 households, when it was in Robat Karim County. The following census in 2011 counted 259,480 people in 72,096 households, by which time the district had been separated from the county in the establishment of Baharestan County. The 2016 census measured the population of the city as 239,556 people in 70,072 households.

== Climate ==
Köppen-Geiger climate classification system classifies its climate as cold semi-arid (BSk). In summer, its average temperatures are cooler than that of Tehran city, so as its average winter temperatures are colder.

Climate data for Golestan
Month	Jan	Feb	Mar	Apr	May	Jun	Jul	Aug	Sep	Oct	Nov	Dec	Year
Mean daily maximum °C (°F)	5.3 (41.5)	7 (45)	11.3 (52.3)	17.9 (64.2)	24 (75)	29.1 (84.4)	31.3 (88.3)	31.6 (88.9)	27.6 (81.7)	21.3 (70.3)	14.8 (58.6)	8.3 (46.9)	19.1 (66.4)
Daily mean °C (°F)	−0.8 (30.6)	1.5 (34.7)	5.2 (41.4)	11.3 (52.3)	16.8 (62.2)	20.9 (69.6)	23.3 (73.9)	23 (73)	18.7 (65.7)	12.9 (55.2)	7.4 (45.3)	2.6 (36.7)	11.9 (53.4)
Mean daily minimum °C (°F)	−6.8 (19.8)	−3.9 (25.0)	−0.8 (30.6)	4.7 (40.5)	9.6 (49.3)	12.8 (55.0)	15.3 (59.5)	14.4 (57.9)	9.8 (49.6)	4.5 (40.1)	0 (32)	−3 (27)	4.7 (40.5)
Average precipitation mm (inches)	28 (1.1)	33 (1.3)	53 (2.1)	50 (2.0)	32 (1.3)	7 (0.3)	1 (0.0)	1 (0.0)	2 (0.1)	14 (0.6)	17 (0.7)	20 (0.8)	258 (10.3)
Source: Climate-Data.org, altitude: 1238m
