= Nasimshahr =

City in Tehran province, Iran

Nasimshahr Persian: نسیم شهر
- City
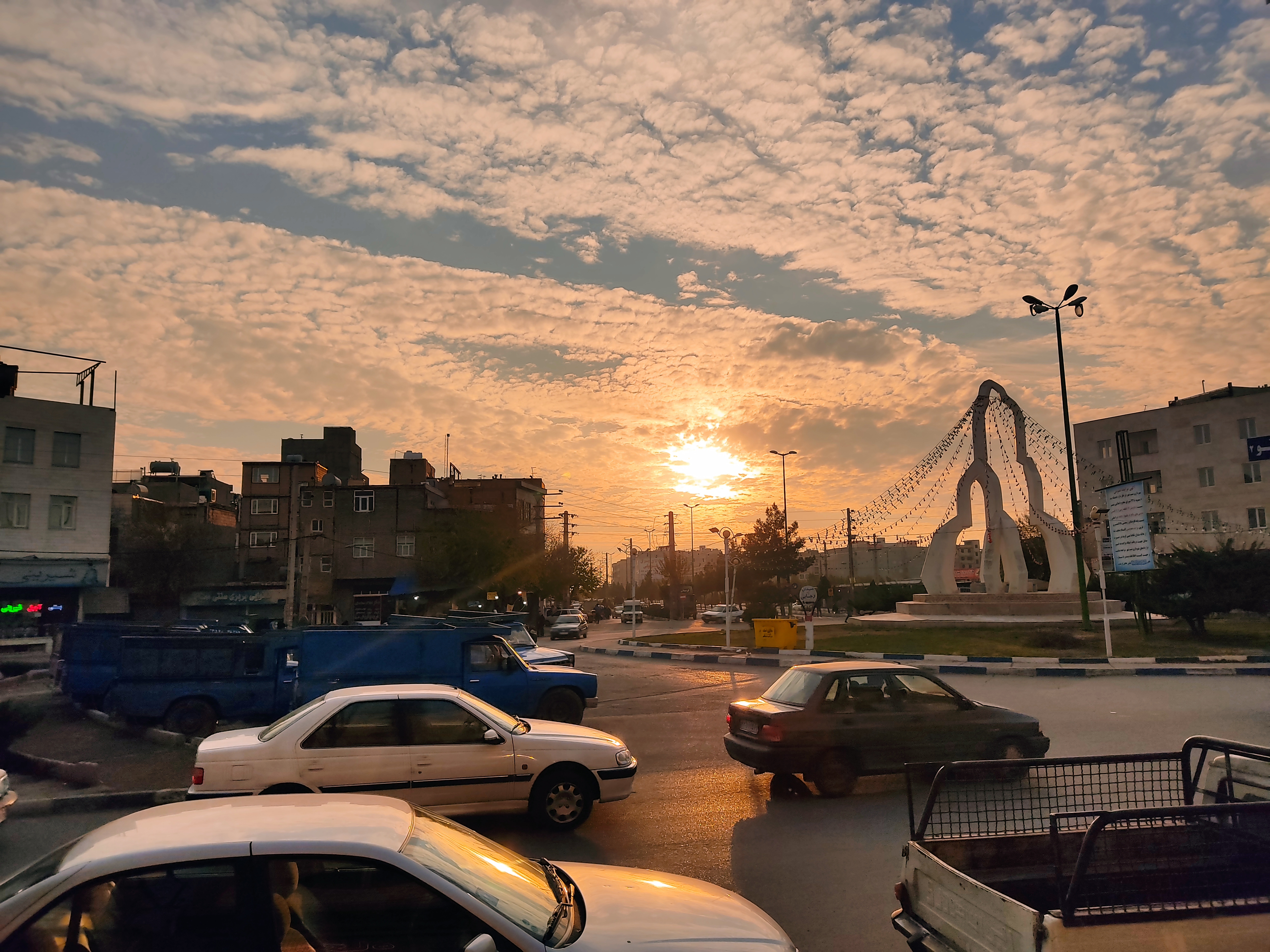
- Shahid Rajayi Square in Nasimshahr

- Location within Iran
- Coordinates: 35°33′42″N 51°09′42″E
- Country: Iran
- Province: Tehran
- County: Baharestan
- District: Bostan
- Established as a city: 1995

Population (2016)
  - Total: 200,393
- Time zone: UTC+3:30 (IRST)

Nasimshahr (Persian: نسیم شهر) (Note: Formerly known as Akbarabad (اکبر آباد), also romanized as Akbarābād, and then Mohajershahr (مهاجر شهر)) is a city in, and the capital of, Bostan District in Baharestan County, Tehran province, Iran. It also serves, with Golestan, (Note: Formerly the village of Soltanabad) as one of the two capitals of the county. The village of Akbarabad was converted to a city in 1995, renamed Mohajershahr in 1996, and renamed Nasimshahr in 1999.

== Demographics ==
=== Population ===
At the time of the 2006 National Census, the city's population was 135,824 in 31,670 households, when it was in Robat Karim County. The following census in 2011 counted 157,474 people in 42,478 households, by which time the district had been separated from the county in the establishment of Baharestan County. The 2016 census measured the population of the city as 200,393 people in 58,431 households.

== See also ==
Media related to Nasimshahr at Wikimedia Commons
