= Nasirshahr =

City in Tehran province, Iran

Nasirshahr Persian: نصيرشهر
- City
- Location within Iran
- Coordinates: 35°29′25″N 51°08′26″E
- Country: Iran
- Province: Tehran
- County: Robat Karim
- District: Central
- Established as a city: 2005

Population (2016)
  - Total: 28,644
- Time zone: UTC+3:30 (IRST)

Nasirshahr (Persian: نصيرشهر) (Note: Also romanized as Nasir Shah; formerly known as Nasirabad (نصيرآباد), also romanized as Naşīrābād) is a city in the Central District of Robat Karim County, Tehran province, Iran. The village of Nasirabad was converted to a city in 2005. Its name was changed to Nasirshahr in 2012. As a village, it was the capital of Meymanat Rural District until its capital was transferred to the village of Meymanatabad.

== Demographics ==
=== Population ===
At the time of the 2006 National Census, the city's population (as Nasirabad) was 23,802 in 5,764 households, when it was in Golestan District. The following census in 2011 counted 26,935 people in 7,121 households, by which time the city had been separated from the district to join the Central District. The 2016 census measured the population of the city as 28,644 people in 8,602 households, when the city had been renamed Nasirshahr.
