= Robat Karim =

City in Tehran province, Iran

Robat Karim Persian: رباط‌كريم
- City
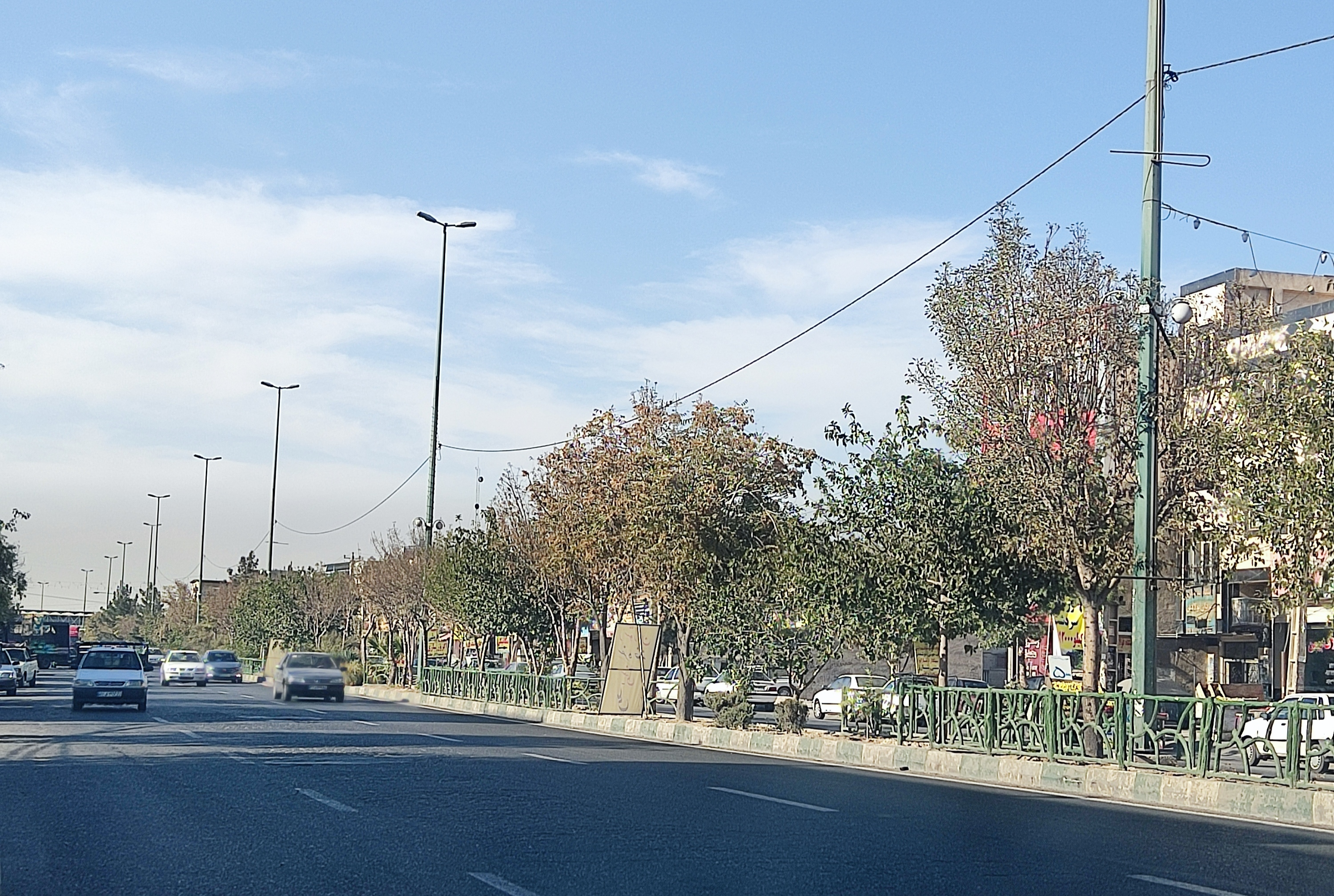
- Street in the city of Robat Karim

- Location within Iran
- Coordinates: 35°28′55″N 51°04′51″E
- Country: Iran
- Province: Tehran
- County: Robat Karim
- District: Central

Population (2016)
  - Total: 105,393
- Time zone: UTC+3:30 (IRST)

Robat Karim (Persian: رباطكريم) (Note: Also romanized as Robāţ Karīm; formerly Shahriar, also romanized as Shahryār) is a city in the Central District of Robat Karim County, Tehran province, Iran, serving as capital of both the county and the district. The city is 27 km (17 mi) southwest of Tehran.

== Demographics ==
=== Population ===
At the time of the 2006 National Census, the city's population was 62,937 in 16,675 households. The following census in 2011 counted 78,097 people in 22,742 households. The 2016 census measured the population of the city as 105,393 people in 31,803 households.

== See also ==
Media related to Robat Karim at Wikimedia Commons
