= Bostan District (Baharestan County) =

District in Tehran province, Iran

Bostan District Persian: بخش بوستان
- District
- Location within Iran
- Coordinates: 35°33′40″N 51°09′23″E
- Country: Iran
- Province: Tehran
- County: Baharestan
- Established: 2002
- Capital: Nasimshahr

Population (2016)
  - Total: 229,603
- Time zone: UTC+3:30 (IRST)

Bostan District (Persian: بخش بوستان) is in Baharestan County, Tehran province, Iran. Its capital is the city of Nasimshahr. (Note: Formerly known as Akbarabad and then Mohajershahr)

== History ==
In 2011, the district was separated from Robat Karim County in the establishment of Baharestan County, which was divided into two districts of two rural districts each, with the cities of Golestan and Nasimshahr as its capitals.

== Demographics ==
=== Population ===
At the time of the 2006 National Census, the district's population (as a part of Robat Karim County) was 168,753 in 39,410 households. The following census in 2011 counted 198,542 people in 53,604 households. The 2016 census measured the population of the district as 229,603 inhabitants in 66,954 households.

=== Administrative divisions ===
Bostan District Population (Note: As a part of Robat Karim County at the 2006 census)
Administrative Divisions	2006	2011	2016
Esmailabad RD	35	(Note: Below the reporting threshold)	0
Hamedanak RD	32,894	41,063	29,210
Nasimshahr (city)	135,824	157,474	200,393
Total	168,753	198,542	229,603
RD = Rural District
