= Golestan District (Baharestan County) =

District in Tehran province, Iran

Golestan District Persian: بخش گلستان
- District
- Location within Iran
- Coordinates: 35°30′N 51°10′E
- Country: Iran
- Province: Tehran
- County: Baharestan
- Established: 1996
- Capital: Golestan

Population (2016)
  - Total: 306,726
- Time zone: UTC+3:30 (IRST)

Golestan District (Persian: بخش گلستان) is in Baharestan County, Tehran province, Iran. Its capital is the city of Golestan. (Note: Formerly the village of Soltanabad)

== History ==
After the 2006 National Census, the district (except the city of Nasirshahr) was separated from Robat Karim County in the establishment of Baharestan County, which was divided into two districts of two rural districts each, with the cities of Golestan and Nasimshahr as its capitals.

== Demographics ==
=== Population ===
At the time of the 2006 census, the district's population (as a part of Robat Karim County) was 317,731 in 78,298 households. The following census in 2011 counted 325,077 people in 89,904 households. The 2016 census measured the population of the district as 306,726 inhabitants in 89,837 households.

=== Administrative divisions ===
Golestan District Population (Note: As a part of Robat Karim County at the 2006 census)
Administrative Divisions	2006	2011	2016
Meymanat RD	7,107	8,258	7,353
Salehabad RD	722	983	1,134
Golestan (city)	231,882	259,480	239,556
Nasirshahr (city) (Note: Remained in Robat Karim County)	23,802		
Salehieh (city) (Note: Formerly Salehabad)	54,218	56,356	58,683
Total	317,731	325,077	306,726
RD = Rural District
