= Baharestan County =

County in Tehran province, Iran

Baharestan County Persian: شهرستان بهارستان
- County
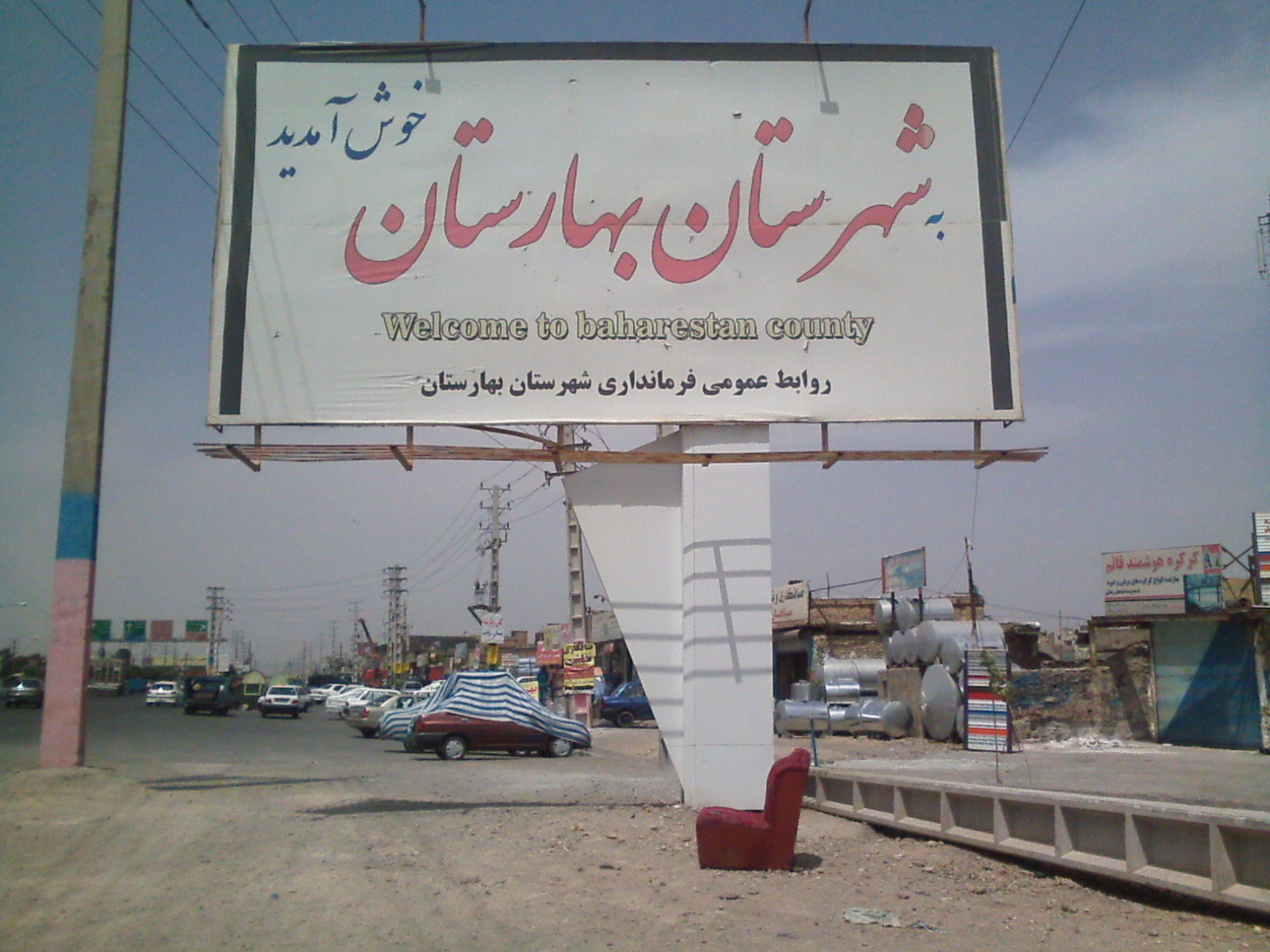
- Welcome sign to Baharestan County

- Location of Baharestan County in Tehran province (center left, yellow)

- Location of Tehran province in Iran
- Coordinates: 35°32′N 51°10′E
- Country: Iran
- Province: Tehran
- Established: 2011
- Capitals: Golestan and Nasimshahr
- Districts: Bostan, Golestan

Population (2016)
  - Total: 536,329
- Time zone: UTC+3:30 (IRST)

Baharestan County (Persian: شهرستان بهارستان) is in Tehran province, Iran. Its capitals are the cities of Golestan (Note: Formerly the village of Soltanabad) and Nasimshahr. (Note: Formerly known as Akbarabad and then Mohajershahr)

== History ==
In 2011, Bostan and Golestan Districts (except the city of Nasirshahr) were separated from Robat Karim County in the establishment of Baharestan County, which was divided into two districts of two rural districts each, with the cities of Golestan and Nasimshahr as its capitals.

== Demographics ==
=== Population ===
At the time of the 2011 National Census, the county's population was 523,636 people in 143,512 households. The 2016 census measured the population of the county as 536,329 in 156,791 households.

=== Administrative divisions ===
Baharestan County's population history and administrative structure over two consecutive censuses are shown in the following table.

Baharestan County Population
Administrative Divisions	2011	2016
Bostan District	198,542	229,603
Esmailabad RD	(Note: Below the reporting threshold)	0
Hamedanak RD	41,063	29,210
Nasimshahr (city)	157,474	200,393
Golestan District	325,077	306,726
Meymanat RD	8,258	7,353
Salehabad RD	983	1,134
Golestan (city)	259,480	239,556
Salehieh (city) (Note: Formerly Salehabad)	56,356	58,683
Total	523,636	536,329
RD = Rural District

== Climate ==
According to the information of the State Meteorological Organization of Iran, the long-term average annual rainfall of Baharestan is around 176.2 mm.

== See also ==
Media related to Baharestan County at Wikimedia Commons
