= Central District (Robat Karim County) =

District in Tehran province, Iran

Central District (Robat Karim County) Persian: بخش مرکزی شهرستان رباط‌کریم
- District
- Location within Iran
- Coordinates: 35°29′N 51°03′E
- Country: Iran
- Province: Tehran
- County: Robat Karim
- Established: 1996
- Capital: Robat Karim

Population (2016)
  - Total: 291,515
- Time zone: UTC+3:30 (IRST)

The Central District of Robat Karim County (Persian: بخش مرکزی شهرستان رباط‌کریم) is in Tehran province, Iran. Its capital is the city of Robat Karim.

== History ==
In 2011, the city of Nasirshahr was separated from Golestan District to join the Central District. The new city of Parand was formed in 2013.

== Demographics ==
=== Population ===
At the time of the 2006 National Census, the district's population was 122,046 in 31,736 households. The following census in 2011 counted 195,917 people in 54,900 households. The 2016 census measured the population of the rural district as 291,515 inhabitants in 89,270 households.

=== Administrative divisions ===
Central District (Robat Karim County) Population
Administrative Divisions	2006	2011	2016
Emamzadeh Abu Taleb RD	4,921	4,985	4,912
Manjilabad RD	48,679	77,681	45,986
Vahnabad RD	5,509	8,219	9,116
Nasirshahr (city) (Note: Formerly Nasirabad; transferred from Golestan District)		26,935	28,644
Parand (city)			97,464
Robat Karim (city)	62,937	78,097	105,393
Total	122,046	195,917	291,515
RD = Rural District
