= Robat Karim County =

County in Tehran province, Iran

Robat Karim County Persian: شهرستان رباط‌کریم
- County
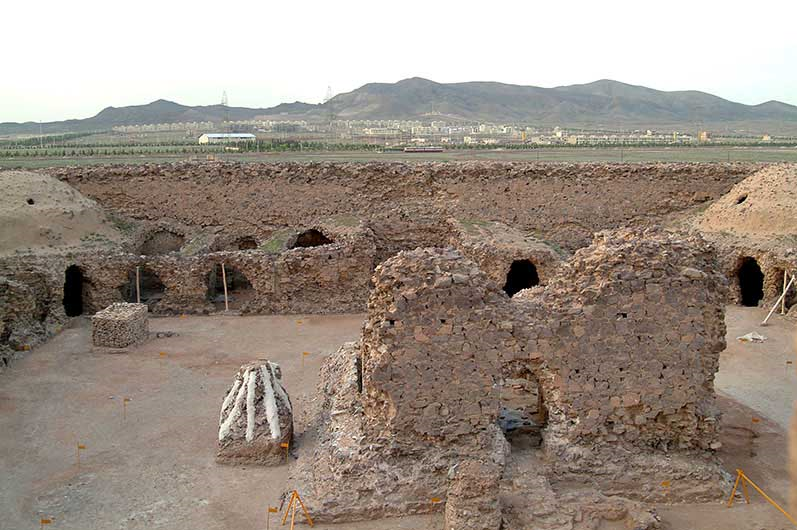
- Parand stone castle in Robat Karim County

- Location of Robat Karim County in Tehran province (center left, pink)

- Location of Tehran province in Iran
- Coordinates: 35°29′N 51°03′E
- Country: Iran
- Province: Tehran
- Established: 1996
- Capital: Robat Karim
- Districts: Central

Population (2016)
  - Total: 291,516
- Time zone: UTC+3:30 (IRST)

Robat Karim County (Persian: شهرستان رباط‌کریم) is in Tehran province, Iran. Its capital is the city of Robat Karim.

== History ==
In 2011, Bostan and Golestan Districts (except the city of Nasirshahr) were separated from the county in the establishment of Baharestan County. The city was transferred to the Central District. The new city of Parand was formed in 2013.

== Demographics ==
=== Population ===
In 1986, the county's population was around 20,000. At the time of the 2006 National Census, the county's population was 608,530 in 149,444 households. The following census in 2011 counted 195,917 people in 54,900 households. The 2016 census measured the population of the county as 291,516 in 89,271 households.

=== Administrative divisions ===
Robat Karim County's population history and administrative structure over three consecutive censuses are shown in the following table.

Robat Karim County Population
Administrative Divisions	2006	2011	2016
Central District	122,046	195,917	291,515
Emamzadeh Abu Taleb RD	4,921	4,985	4,912
Manjilabad RD	48,679	77,681	45,986
Vahnabad RD	5,509	8,219	9,116
Nasirshahr (city) (Note: Formerly Nasirabad)		26,935	28,644
Parand (city)			97,464
Robat Karim (city)	62,937	78,097	105,393
Bostan District (Note: Transferred to Baharestan County, except the city of Nasirshahr)	168,753		
Esmailabad RD	35		
Hamedanak RD	32,894		
Nasimshahr (city) (Note: Formerly Akbarabad and Mohajershahr)	135,824		
Golestan District	317,731		
Meymanat RD	7,107		
Salehabad RD	722		
Golestan (city)	231,882		
Nasirshahr (city)	23,802		
Salehieh (city) (Note: Formerly Salehabad)	54,218		
Total	608,530	195,917	291,516
RD = Rural District

== Climate ==
According to the information of the State Meteorological Organization of Tehran province, the long-term average annual rainfall of Robat Karim County is around 176 mm

== See also ==
- Fath-Ali Shahi Caravanserai

Media related to Robat Karim County at Wikimedia Commons
