= Meydan-e Mohammadiyeh Metro Station =

Station of the Tehran Metro

Meydan-e Mohammadiyeh Metro Station ایستگاه مترو میدان محمدیه

General information
- Location: Mohammadiyeh Square; District 12, Tehran, Tehran County; Iran
- Coordinates: 35°40′5.95″N 51°24′56.14″E
- System: Tehran Metro Station
- Operator: Tehran Urban and Suburban Railways Organization (Metro)
- Connections: Tehran BRT: BRT 2; Tehran Buses: 238 Mohammadieh Sq.-Shahrak-e Resalat; 243 Emam Khomeini Metro-13 Aban; 257 Fayyazbakhsh Term.-Abrisham Term.; 258 Fayyazbakhsh Term.-Javadieh; 337 Emam Khomeini Metro-Qods Blvd.; 338 Emam Khomeini Metro-Parking Shahr-e Rey; 364 Fayyazbakhsh Term.-Khaniabad-e Now; 376 Fayyazbakhsh Term.-Shahrak-e Vesal; 408 Fayyazhbakhsh Term.-Baharan Sq.; 417 Sarvari Term.-Fayyazbakhsh Term.; 902 Azadi Term.-Khavaran Term.; 912 Terminal-e Jonub-Ferdowsi Sq.

History
- Opened: 1380 H-Kh (28 August 2001); 20 Khordad 1396 (10 June 2017)
- Closed: 8 Aban 1396 H-Kh
- Rebuilt: 4 Shahrivar 1398 H-Kh (26 August 2019)

Services
Preceding station	Tehran Metro	Following station
Khayam towards Tajrish	Line 1	Shush towards Kahrizak
Molavi towards Varzeshgah-e Takhti	Line 7	Mahdiyeh towards Meydan-e Ketab
Location

Meydan-e Mohammadiyeh Metro Station is a station in Tehran Metro Line 1 and Line 7. It is located in Mohammadiyeh Square, junction of Khayam Street and Molavi Street. The station was known as Molavi Metro Station until May 23, 2017.
