= Khayam Metro Station =

Station of the Tehran Metro

Khayyam Metro Station ایستگاه مترو خیام

General information
- Location: Khayyam Street; District 12, Tehran, Tehran County; Iran
- Coordinates: 35°40′23.37″N 51°24′59.27″E
- System: Tehran Metro Station
- Operator: Tehran Urban and Suburban Railways Organization (Metro)
- Connections: Tehran Buses: 243 Emam Khomeini Metro-13 Aban; 257 Fayyazbakhsh Term.-Abrisham Term.; 258 Fayyazbakhsh Term.-Javadieh; 337 Emam Khomeini Metro-Qods Blvd.; 338 Emam Khomeini Metro-Parking Shahr-e Rey; 364 Fayyazbakhsh Term.-Khaniabad-e Now; 376 Fayyazbakhsh Term.-Shahrak-e Vesal; 408 Fayyazhbakhsh Term.-Baharan Sq.; 417 Sarvari Term.-Fayyazbakhsh Term.; 912 Terminal-e Jonub-Ferdowsi Sq.

History
- Opened: 1380 H-Kh (2001)

Services
Preceding station	Tehran Metro	Following station
Panzdah-e-Khordad towards Tajrish	Line 1	Meydan-e Mohammadiyeh towards Kahrizak
Location

Khayyam Metro Station is a station in Tehran Metro Line 1. It is located in Khayyam Street. It is between Meydan-e Mohammadiyeh Metro Station and Panzdah-e-Khordad Metro Station. The station provides access to Tehran Grand Bazar.
