= Panzdah-e-Khordad Metro Station =

Station of the Tehran Metro

Panzdah-e-Khordad Metro Station ایستگاه مترو پانزده خرداد

General information
- Location: Khayyam Street- Panzdah-e Khordad Street; District 12, Tehran, Tehran County; Tehran Province, Iran
- Coordinates: 35°40′40.78″N 51°25′2.94″E
- System: Tehran Metro Station
- Operator: Tehran Urban and Suburban Railways Organization (Metro)
- Connections: Tehran Buses: 243 Emam Khomeini Metro-13 Aban; 256 Fayyazbakhsh Term.-17 Shahrivar (Naziabad); 257 Fayyazbakhsh Term.-Abrisham Term.; 258 Fayyazbakhsh Term.-Javadieh; 337 Emam Khomeini Metro-Qods Blvd.; 338 Emam Khomeini Metro-Parking Shahr-e Rey; 359 Rahahan-Haft-e Tir; 364 Fayyazbakhsh Term.-Khaniabad-e Now; 376 Fayyazbakhsh Term.-Shahrak-e Vesal; 403 Fayyazbakhsh Term.-Shamshiri St.; 408 Fayyazhbakhsh Term.-Baharan Sq.; 413 Fayyazbakhsh Term.-Ferdows (Mehrabad); 417 Sarvari Term.-Fayyazbakhsh Term.; 912 Terminal-e Jonub-Ferdowsi Sq.

History
- Opened: 1380 H-Kh (2001)

Services
| Preceding station | Tehran Metro | Following station |
|---|---|---|
| Imam Khomeini towards Tajrish | Line 1 | Khayam towards Kahrizak |
Location

Panzdah-e Khordad Metro Station (15th Khordad metro station) is a station in Tehran Metro Line 1. It is located near the northwestern entrance of Grand Bazaar of Tehran and Golestan Palace, two of the most visited landmarks of Tehran. The station is named after the 1963 demonstrations in Iran, which in the Iranian calendar, took place on 15th Khordad, 1342 AH. In 1404 (2025-2026), this station was the busiest of Tehran Metro, serving 9,195,734 passengers.
