= Darvazeh Dowlat Metro Station =

Station of the Tehran Metro

Darvazeh Dowlat ایستگاه مترو دروازه دولت
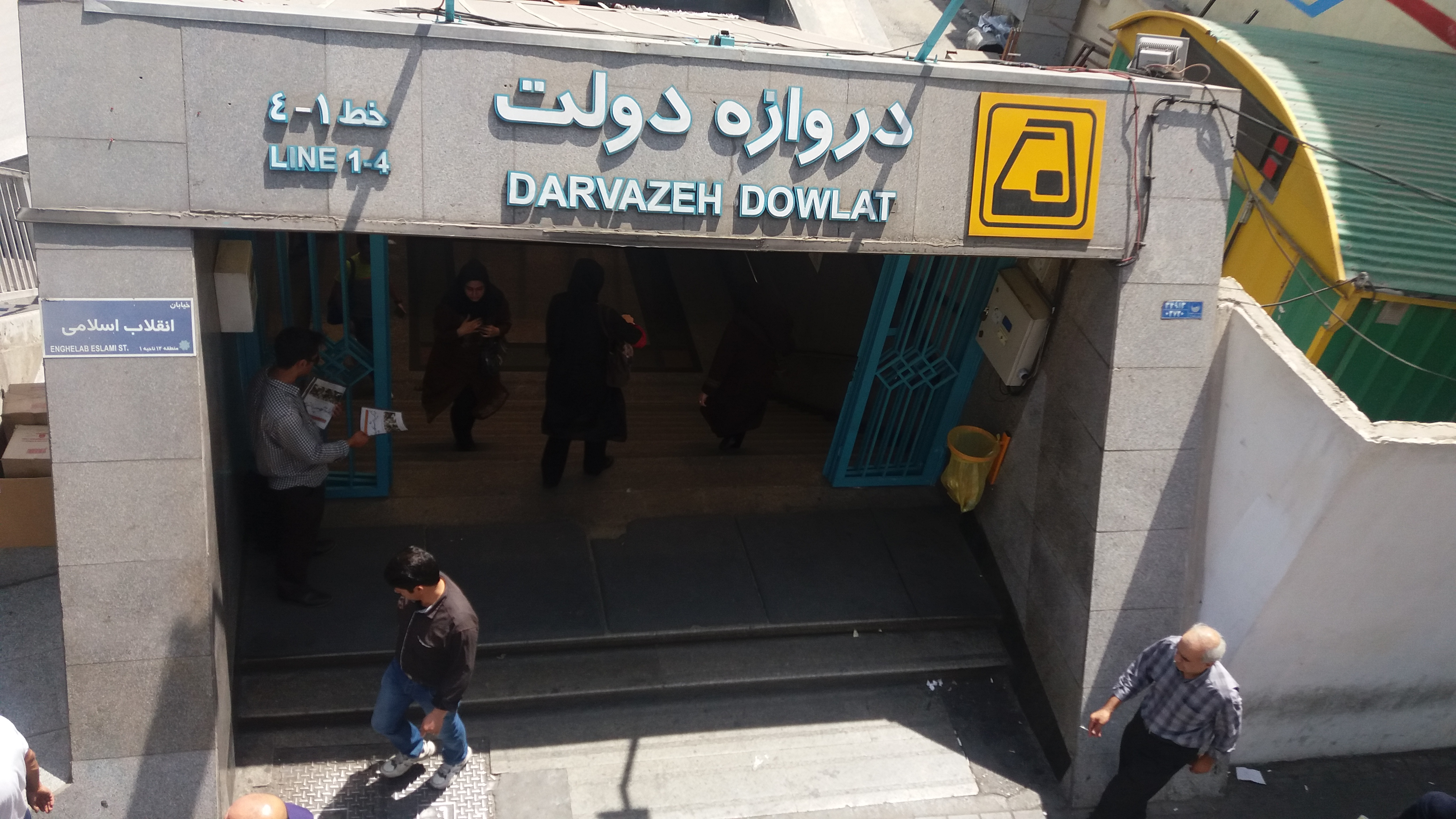

General information
- Location: Azadi Street- Mofatteh Street- Saadi Street; Districts 6-7-12, Tehran, Tehran County; Tehran Province, Iran
- Coordinates: 35°42′06.16″N 51°25′33.72″E
- System: Tehran Metro Station
- Operator: Tehran Urban and Suburban Railways Organization (Metro)
- Platforms: 2 Side Platforms Tehran Metro Line 1 2 Side Platforms Tehran Metro Line 4
- Tracks: 4
- Connections: Bus routes: BRT Line 1

Construction
- Structure type: Underground
- Platform levels: 2

History
- Opened: 1380 H-Kh (2001); 1386 H-Kh (2007)

Services
Preceding station	Tehran Metro	Following station
Taleghani towards Tajrish	Line 1	Saadi towards Kahrizak
Ferdowsi towards Allameh Jafari	Line 4	Darvazeh Shemiran towards Shahid Kolahdooz
Location

Darvazeh Dowlat Metro Station is the junction of Tehran Metro Line 1 and Tehran Metro Line 4. It is located in the junction of Enghelab Street, Saadi Street and Dr. Mofatteh Street. It is between Panzdah-e-Khordad Metro Station and Saadi Metro Station in Line 1 and Mellat Metro Station and Hasan Abad Metro Station. This station is a crowded station because it has connections to Tarbiat Modares University, Ferdowsi Shoe Bazar, Enghelab Book Bazar and Tehran Bus BRT1.
