= Palayeshgah Metro Station =

Station of the Tehran Metro

Palayeshgah Metro Station ایستگاه مترو پالایشگاه

General information
- Location: Baqershahr, Ray County; Tehran province, Iran
- Coordinates: 35.5598°N 51.3993°E
- System: Tehran Metro Station
- Operator: Tehran Urban and Suburban Railways Organization (Metro)
- Platforms: 2 Side Platforms
- Tracks: 2

Construction
- Structure type: Surface

History
- Opened: 1384 H-Kh (2005)

Services
Preceding station	Tehran Metro	Following station
Shahr-e-Rey towards Tajrish	Line 1	Shahed – Bagher Shahr towards Kahrizak
Location

Palayeshgah Metro Station is a station in Tehran Metro Line 1. It is located near Tehran Refinery, a town near Shahr-e-Rey on the southern outskirts of Tehran. It is between Shahed - Bagher Shahr Metro Station and Shahr-e-Rey Metro Station.

The station was formerly called Bagher Shahr but the name was changed, along with the name of Shahed – Bagher Shahr Metro Station, formerly known simply as Shahed, on 26 August 2017. The reason was that this station, even-though named after the town Baqershahr, it is 3.3 km (2.1 mi) away from town limit, but only 1 km (0.62 mi) away from Tehran Refinery, after which it is now named. Whereas the other station is only 0.8 km (0.50 mi) away from the city limit, even though it wasn't named after it.
