= Shush Metro Station =

Station of the Tehran Metro

Shoush ایستگاه مترو شوش
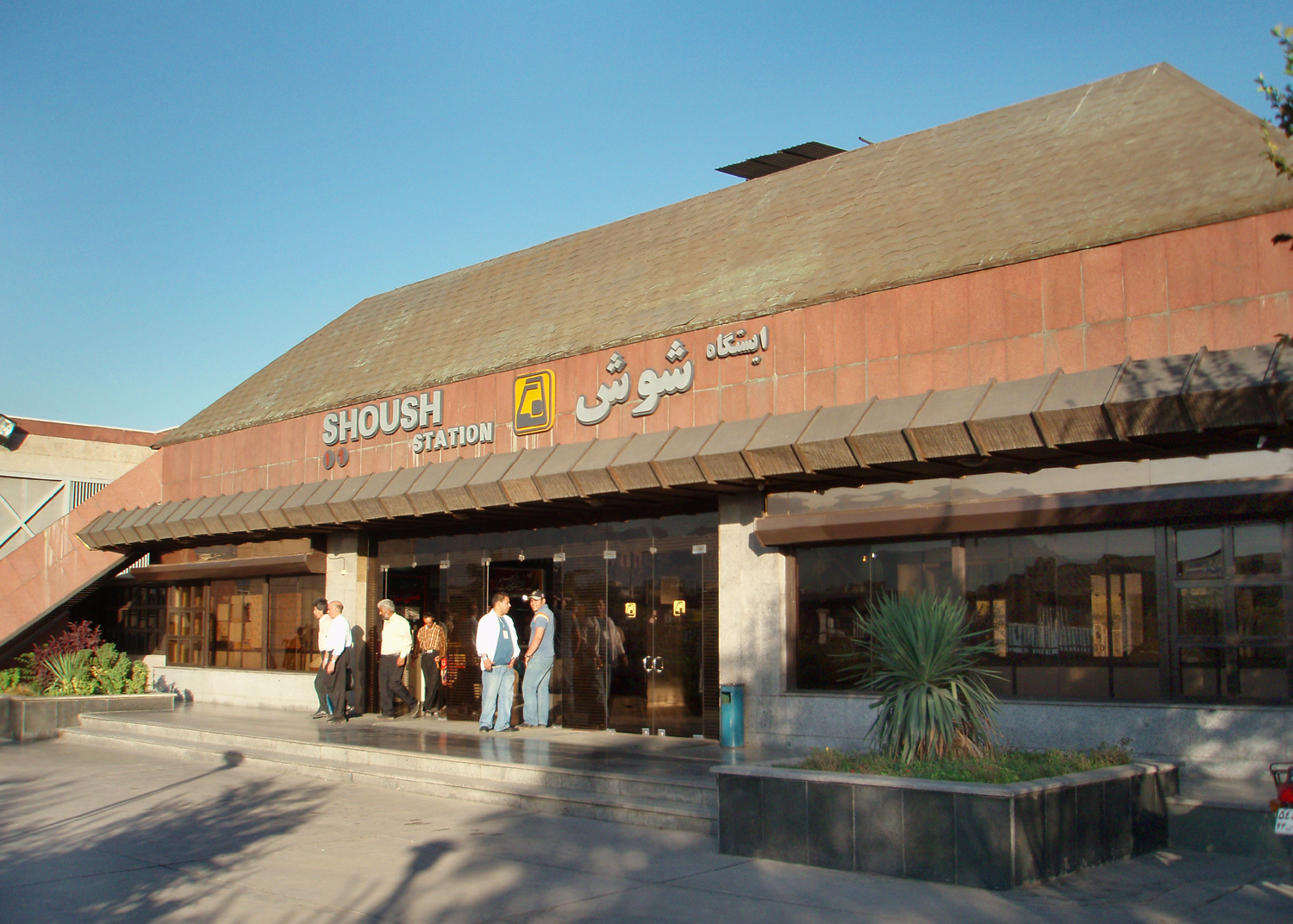
- Entrance to the metro station, 2008.

General information
- Location: Junction of Shush Street and Khayyam Street; District 16, Tehran; Iran
- Coordinates: 35°39′30″N 51°24′51″E
- Operator: Tehran Urban and Suburban Railways Organization (Metro)
- Connections: Tehran Buses: 245 Rahahan-Naziabad-Shahr-e Rey Metro; 246 Rahahan-Khazaneh-Shahr-e Rey Metro; 257 Fayyazbakhsh Term.-Abrisham Term.; 316 Shush Metro-Kianshahr; 320 Rahahan-Khorasan Sq.; 337 Emam Khomeini Metro-Qods Blvd.; 349 Rahahan-Mahallati Exp'way; 367 Terminal-e Jonub-Enqelab Sq.; 911 Rahahan-Emam Hossein Sq.; 912 Terminal-e Jonub-Ferdowsi Sq.

History
- Opened: 1380 H-Kh (2001)

Services
Preceding station	Tehran Metro	Following station
Meydan-e Mohammadiyeh towards Tajrish	Line 1	Payane Jonoob towards Kahrizak
Location

Shush Metro Station is a station in Tehran Metro Line 1. It is located in Shush Street. It is between Payane Jonoob Metro Station and Meydan-e Mohammadiyeh Metro Station.

Route 5 of the Tehran trolleybus system served Meydan-e-Shush (Shush Square) starting in the 1990s, and thus connected with the metro system at this station after the station's opening in 2001. However, all trolleybus service in Tehran was discontinued around 2013.

== Facilities ==
The station has a ticket office, escalators, elevators, cash machines, toilets, a taxi stand, public transportation, a pay phone, water fountains, and a lost and found.
