= Shohada-ye Haftom-e Tir Metro Station =

Station of the Tehran Metro

Shohada-ye Haftom-e Tir Metro Station ایستگاه مترو شهدای هفتم تیر
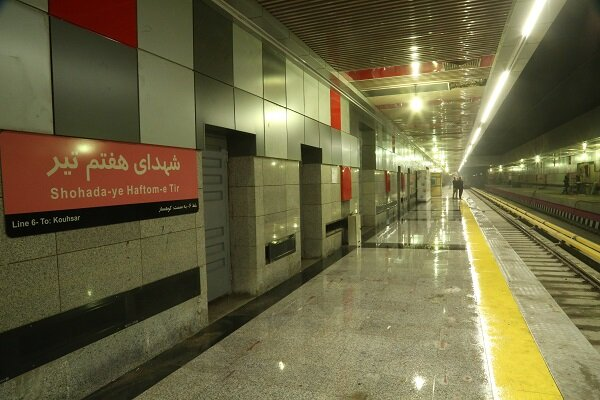
- Shohada-ye Haftom-e Tir Metro Station

General information
- Location: Haft-e Tir Square; District 6 and District 7, Tehran, Tehran County; Tehran Province, Iran
- Coordinates: 35°42′57″N 51°25′34″E
- System: Tehran Metro Station
- Operator: Tehran Urban and Suburban Railways Organization (Metro)
- Connections: Tehran Buses: 267 Enqelab Sq.-Beyhaqi Term.; 277 Haft-e Tir-Kalantari Sq.; 297 Haft-e Tir-Parkway; 307 Haft-e Tir-San'at Sq.; 314 Valiasr Sq.-Mo'allem St.; 355 Haft-e Tir-Azadi Sq.; 357 Emam Khomeini Metro-Qods Sq.; 359 Rahahan-Haft-e Tir; 371 Haft-e Tir-Sadeghiyeh 2nd Sq.

History
- Opened: 1380 H-Kh (2001); 1401H-Kh (18 March 2023)

Services
Preceding station	Tehran Metro	Following station
Shahid Mofatteh towards Tajrish	Line 1	Taleghani towards Kahrizak
Location

Shohada-ye Haftom-e Tir Metro Station, also simply called Haft-e Tir Metro Station is a railway station on Tehran Metro Line 1. It is located below Hafte Tir Square in the central business district of Tehran. It is between Taleghani Metro Station and Shahid Mofatteh Metro Station. It has connections to the Modarres Expressway and the Karimkhan Zand Boulevard.
