= Shahr-e-Rey Metro Station =

Station of the Tehran Metro

Shahr-e Rey Metro Station ایستگاه مترو شهر ری
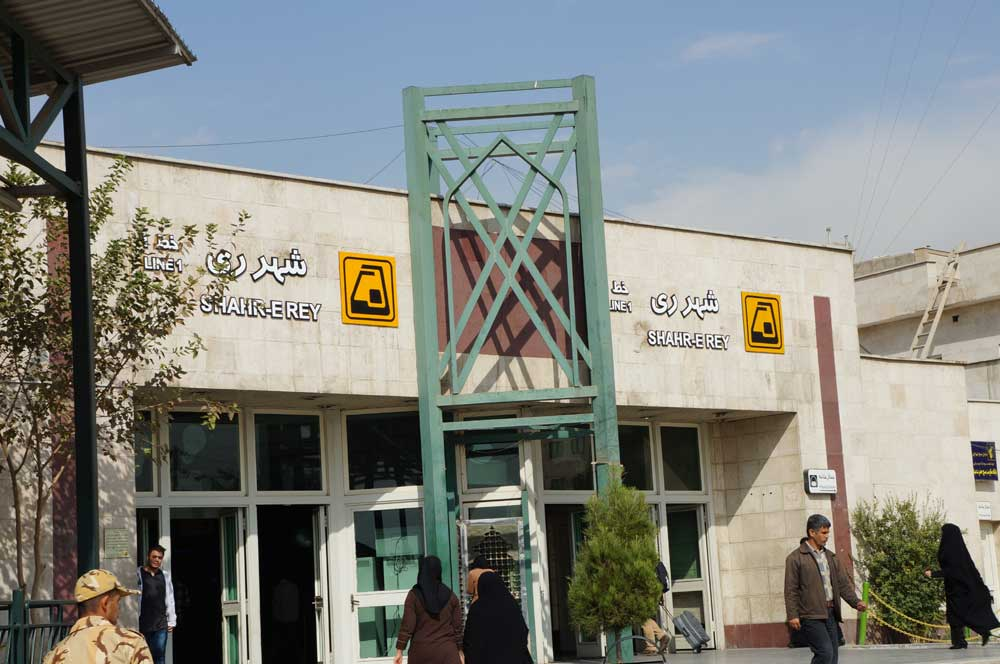

General information
- Location: District 20, Tehran, Ray County; Iran
- Coordinates: 35°35′42.36″N 51°25′20.56″E
- System: Tehran Metro Station
- Operator: Tehran Urban and Suburban Railways Organization (Metro)
- Platforms: Side Platform
- Tracks: 2
- Connections: Tehran Buses: 245 Shahr-e Rey Metro-Naziabad-Rahahan; 246 Shahr-e Rey Metro-Khazaneh-Rahahan; 260 Shahr-e Rey Metro-Hasanabad; 332 Shahr-e Rey Metro-Shahrak-e Mofatteh; 333 Shahr-e Rey Metro-Shahrak-e Nezami; 334 Shahr-e Rey Metro-Parking Shahr-e Rey; 335 Shahr-e Rey Metro-Dolatabad 3rd Sq.; 339 Shahr-e Rey Metro-Baqershahr; 340 Shahr-e Rey Metro-Khorasan Sq.; 341 Shahr-e Rey Metro-Rastegar St.; 342 Shahr-e Rey Metro-Qamsar; 343 Shahr-e Rey Metro-Torquzabad; 346 Shahr-e Rey Metro-Shahrak-e Safaeiyeh

Construction
- Structure type: Surface

History
- Opened: 1380 H-Kh (2001)

Services
| Preceding station | Tehran Metro | Following station |
|---|---|---|
| Javanmard-e-Ghassab towards Tajrish | Line 1 | Palayeshgah towards Kahrizak |
Location

Shahr-e-Rey Metro Station is a station in Tehran Metro Line 1. It is located in Shahr-e-Rey. It is between Bagher Shahr Metro Station and Javanmard-e-Ghassab Metro Station.
