= Taleghani Metro Station =

Station of the Tehran Metro

Taleghani ایستگاه مترو طالقانی
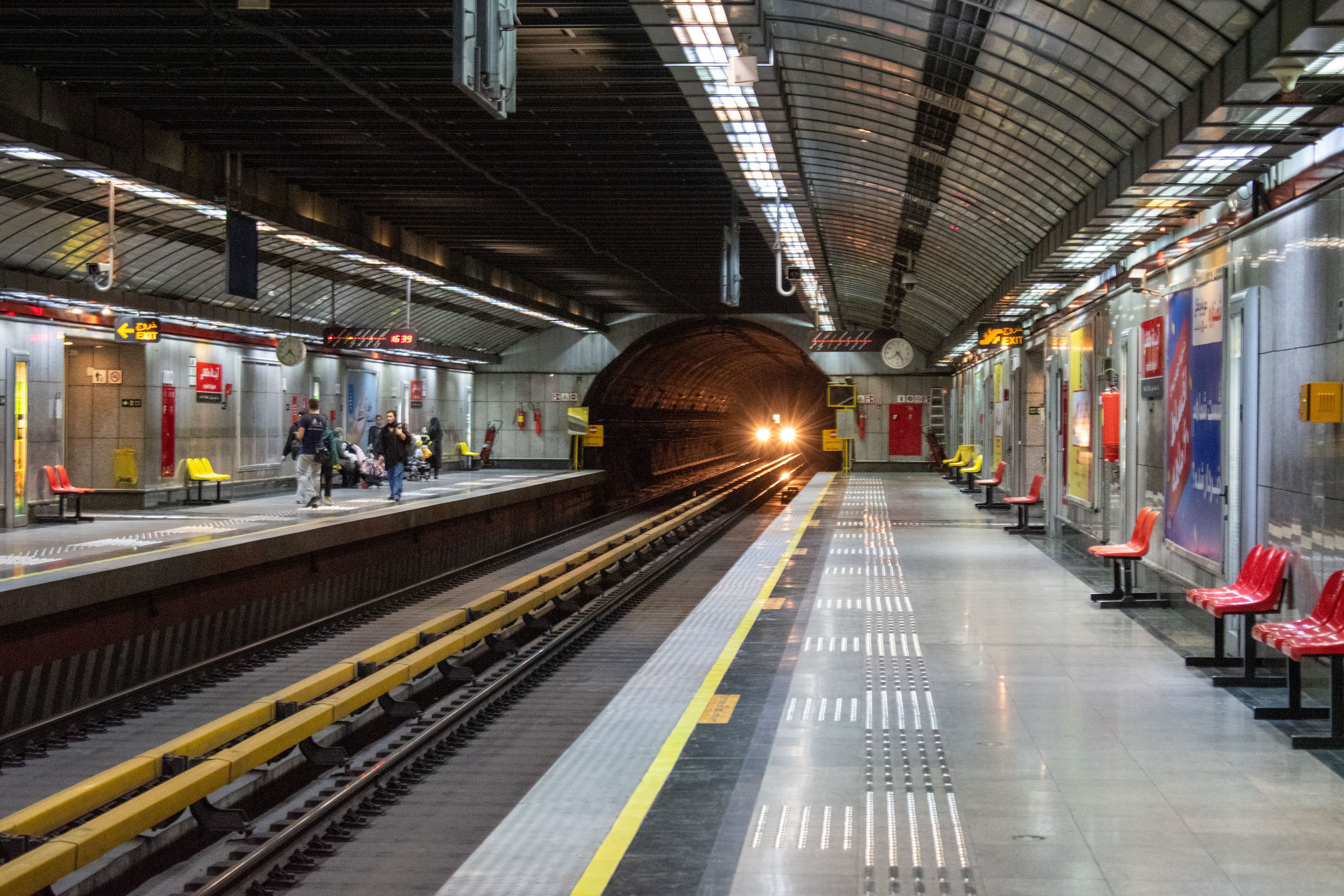

General information
- Location: Mofatteh Street- Takhte Jamshid Street; District 6 and District 7, Tehran, Tehran County; Tehran Province, Iran
- Coordinates: 35°42′25.78″N 51°25′33.72″E
- System: Tehran Metro Station
- Operator: Tehran Urban and Suburban Railways Organization (Metro)

History
- Opened: 1380 H-Kh (2001)

Services
Preceding station	Tehran Metro	Following station
Shohada-ye Haftom-e Tir towards Tajrish	Line 1	Darvazeh Dowlat towards Kahrizak
Location

Taleghani Metro Station is a station in Tehran Metro Line 1. It is located in the junction of Takhte Jamshid Street and Dr. Mofatteh Street. It is between Darvaze Dolat Metro Station and Haft-e-Tir Metro Station.
