= Ali Abad Metro Station =

Station of the Tehran Metro

Ali Abad Metro Station ایستگاه مترو علی آباد

General information
- Location: District 16, Tehran; Iran
- Coordinates: 35°37′42.33″N 51°24′58.20″E
- System: Tehran Metro Station
- Operator: Tehran Urban and Suburban Railways Organization (Metro)
- Connections: Tehran Buses: 240 Shahrak-e Resalat - Ali Abad Metro; 241 Shahrak-e Towhid - Ali Abad Metro; 244 Mortezagard - Ali Abad Metro; 245 Rahahan-Naziabad-Shahr-e Rey Metro; 246 Rahahan-Khazaneh-Shahr-e Rey Metro; 257 Fayyazbakhsh Term.-Abrisham Term.; 338 Emam Khomeini Metro-Parking Shahr-e Rey; 373 Khani Abad-e Now - Ali Abad Metro; 380 Shahrak-e Vesal- Ali Abad Metro; 410 Shokufeh- Ali Abad Metro

History
- Opened: 1380 H-Kh (2001)

Services
Preceding station	Tehran Metro	Following station
Shahid Bokharaei towards Tajrish	Line 1	Javanmard-e-Ghassab towards Kahrizak
Location

Ali Abad Metro Station is a station in Tehran Metro Line 1. It is located in Shahid Dastvare Boulevard. It is between Javanmard-e-Ghassab Metro Station and Khazane Metro Station.
