= Payane Jonoob Metro Station =

Station of the Tehran Metro

Payane Jonoob Metro Station ایستگاه مترو پایانه جنوب

General information
- Location: Besat Expressway; District 16, Tehran, Tehran County; Iran
- Coordinates: 35°38′52.31″N 51°24′56.18″E
- System: Tehran Metro Station
- Operator: Tehran Urban and Suburban Railways Organization (Metro)
- Connections: Tehran Southern Bus Terminal Tehran BRT: BRT 4; BRT 8; Tehran Buses: 203 Shahrak-e Borujerdi - South Terminal; 246Rahahan-Khazaneh-Shahr-e Rey Metro; 257 Fayyazbakhsh Term.-Abrisham Term.; 319 South Saadi - South Terminal; 367 Fayyazbakhsh Term.-Shahrak-e Vesal

History
- Opened: 1380 H-Kh (2001)

Services
Preceding station	Tehran Metro	Following station
Shush towards Tajrish	Line 1	Shahid Bokharaei towards Kahrizak
Location

Payane Jonoob (South Terminal) Metro Station, formerly called Terminal-e Jonoob is a station in Tehran Metro Line 1. It is located in Tehran southern Bus Terminal. It is between Khazane Metro Station and Shush Metro Station.
