= Shahid Bokharaei Metro Station =

Station of the Tehran Metro

Shahid Bokharaei Metro Station ایستگاه مترو شهید بخارایی

General information
- Location: District 16, Tehran, Tehran County; Iran
- Coordinates: 35°38′27.24″N 51°24′53.92″E
- System: Tehran Metro Station
- Operator: Tehran Urban and Suburban Railways Organization (Metro)

History
- Opened: 1380 H-Kh (2001)

Services
Preceding station	Tehran Metro	Following station
Payane Jonoob towards Tajrish	Line 1	Ali Abad towards Kahrizak
Location

Shahid Bokharaei Metro Station is a station in Tehran Metro Line 1 and was formerly named Khazane Metro Station until 2016. It is between Ali Abad Metro Station and Payane Jonoob Metro Station.
