= Imam Khomeini Airport station =

Station of the Tehran Metro

Imam Khomeini Airport station ایستگاه مترو فرودگاه امام خمینی
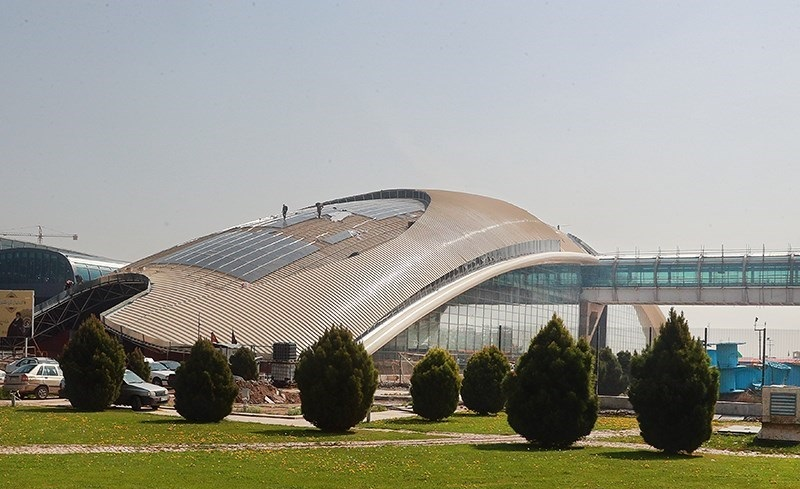

General information
- Location: Hasanabad Rural District, Ray County; Tehran Province, Iran
- Coordinates: 35.4078°N 51.1545°E
- System: Tehran Metro station
- Operator: Tehran Urban and Suburban Railways Organization (Metro)
- Line: Tehran Metro Line 1 branch line (2016–2023 termed Line 8)
- Platforms: Side Platform

History
- Opened: 16 Mordad 1396 H-Sh (7 August 2017)

Services
Preceding station	Tehran Metro	Following station
Shahr-e Aftab towards Shahed - Bagher Shahr	Line 1	Shahr-e Parand Terminus
Location

Imam Khomeini Airport station is a station on a branch of Line 1 of the Tehran Metro. It is adjacent to Imam Khomeini International Airport. The station serves the airport and the surrounding, related facilities. Until 30 November 2023, when the extension towards Parand was inaugurated, it was the southern terminus of the line.
