= Shahid Mofatteh Metro Station =

Shahid Mofatteh Metro Station may refer to these metro stations in Iran:

- Shahid Mofatteh Metro Station (Tehran)
- Shahid Mofatteh Metro Station (Mashhad)

== See also ==
- Shahid Mofatteh (disambiguation)
