= Haram-e Motahhar-e Emam Khomeini Metro Station =

Station of the Tehran Metro

Haram-e Motahhar-e Emam Khomeini Metro Station ایستگاه مترو حرم مطهر امام خمینی
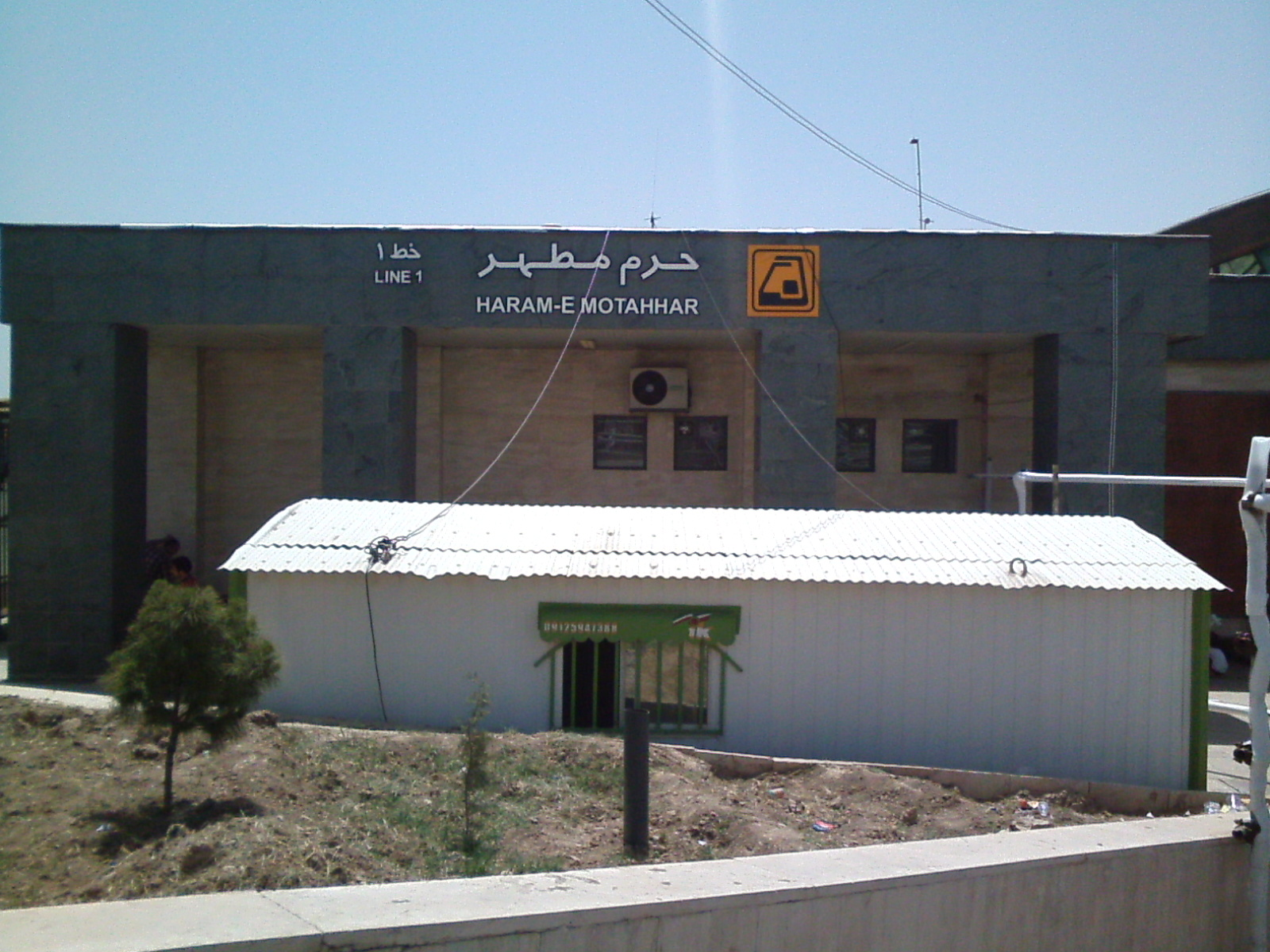

General information
- Location: Behesht-e Zahra, Tehran County; Iran
- Coordinates: 35°32′42.38″N 51°22′22.74″E
- System: Tehran Metro Station
- Operator: Tehran Urban and Suburban Railways Organization (Metro)
- Platforms: 2 Side Platforms
- Tracks: 2
- Connections: Tehran Buses: 239 Basirat-Imam Khomeini Shrine

Construction
- Structure type: Underground
- Depth: Shallow
- Parking: Yes
- Cycle facilities: Yes

History
- Opened: 1382 H-Kh (2003)

Services
Preceding station	Tehran Metro	Following station
Shahed - Bagher Shahr towards Tajrish	Line 1	Kahrizak Terminus
Location

Haram-e Motahhar-e Emam Khomeini Metro station, formerly simply called Haram-e Motahhar Metro Station, is a station of Tehran Metro Line 1. The next station is Shahed - Bagher Shahr on the north side and Kahrizak on the south side. It is located east of Mausoleum of Khomeini.
