= Javan Mard-e Ghassab Tomb =

Twelver Shi'ite tomb in Tehran province, Iran

- بقعه جوانمرد قصاب
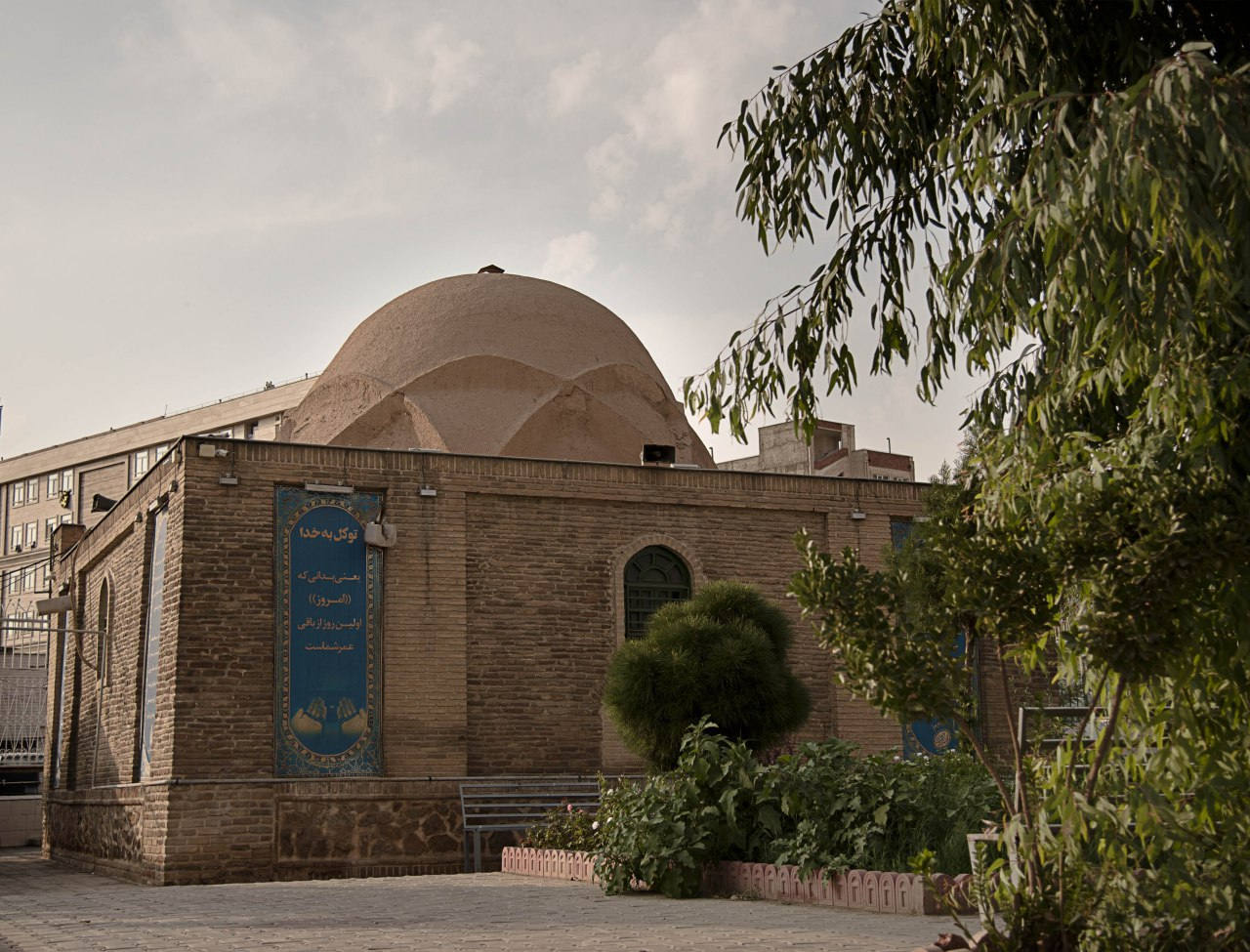

- Location of the complex in Iran

Religion
- Affiliation: Shia (Twelver)
- Ecclesiastical or organizational status: Mausoleum
- Status: Active

Location
- Location: Shahr-e Ray, Tehran Province
- Country: Iran
- Interactive map of Javan Mard-e Ghassab Tomb
- Coordinates: 35°36′30″N 51°25′31″E

Architecture
- Type: Persian architecture
- Style: Qajar

Specifications
- Dome: One (maybe more)
- Shrine: One: Javanmard Ghassab
- Materials: Bricks

The Javan Mard-e Ghassab Tomb (Persian: بقعه جوانمرد قصاب, lit. 'Tomb of the chivalrous butcher') is a Twelver Shia mausoleum, located in Shahr-e Ray, in the south of the province of Tehran, Iran. It was built during the Qajar era, at sometime during the reign of Fath-Ali Shah Qajar.

The mausoleum is adjacent to the Javanmard-e-Ghassab Metro Station. The district surrounding the mausoleum and the railway station is known as Javanmard Qasab.

== Javanmard Ghassab ==
Javanmard Ghassab (Persian: جوانمرد قصاب) is a semi-legendary historical character. According to the legend, Javanmard Ghassab was a butcher who refused to sell meat to a slave girl, because she had made him angry several times complaining about the quality of the meat. Ali ibn Abi Talib was just passing by, and heard the slave girl crying; and consequently he learned about what had happened. Ali then came up to the shop and asked Javanmard to give her the meat she wanted. Javanmard was one of the faithful believers of Ali, but he did not recognize him by face, so he refused to give the slave girl what she wanted. But after Ali had left, Javanmard was told by a passerby that Ali was the one who had visited him. This made him feel very ashamed of himself, and he resorted to cutting out his own eyes and arm out to be sent to Ali in grievance, for forgiveness. His apology was accepted, then Ali read out Surah al-Fatihah and restored him to his normal condition.

Other legends state that Javanmard Ghassab was a young butcher whom Ali rewarded with three gold rings after the Khaybar event for helping to sharpen his sword. No detailed information, however, is found for any person named Javanmard Ghassab. It is also theorised that the entombed is in fact the Sufi mystic, Abul-Abbas Qassab Amoli, who was a real person and not semi-legendary.

== Architecture ==
The mausoleum was built on a quadrangular plan. The mausoleum is situated in the centre of a garden, which is separated from it by a large metal fence, stretched all around the building. Inside the mausoleum there is a simple black marble tombstone over the grave of Javanmard Ghassab, enclosed in a protective glass case. The tombstone's inscription reads, in the Nastaliq script:

This young man, the butcher, was the lion of Yazdan. May his grave be in the heaven, for it was a place of pilgrimage for those who had faith.

== Other tombs dedicated to Javanmard Ghassab ==
In the city of Dezful, there is another tomb dedicated to Javanmard Ghassab. It is said that this tomb is symbolic only.

== Gallery ==
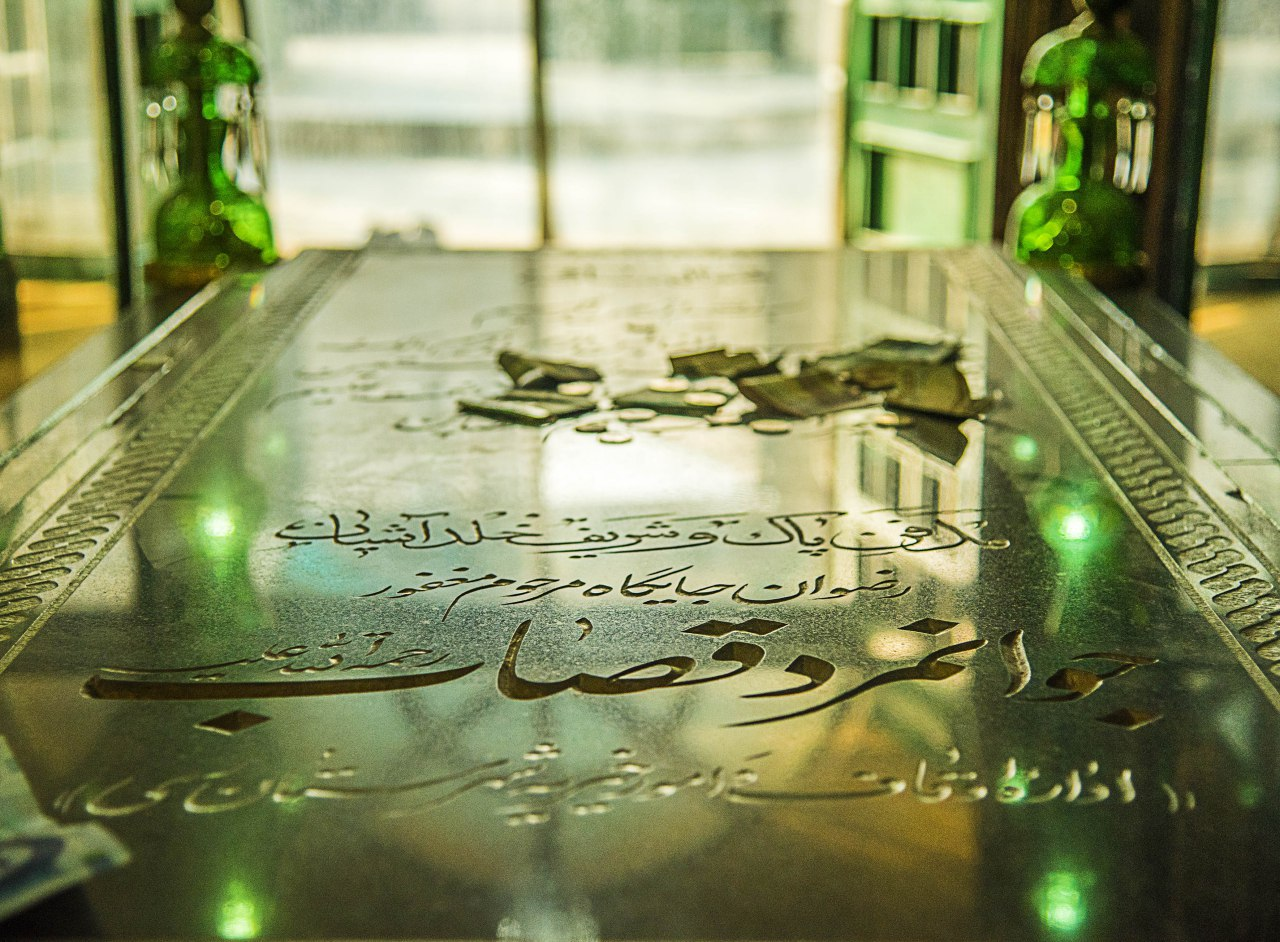
The gravestone of Javanmard Ghassab

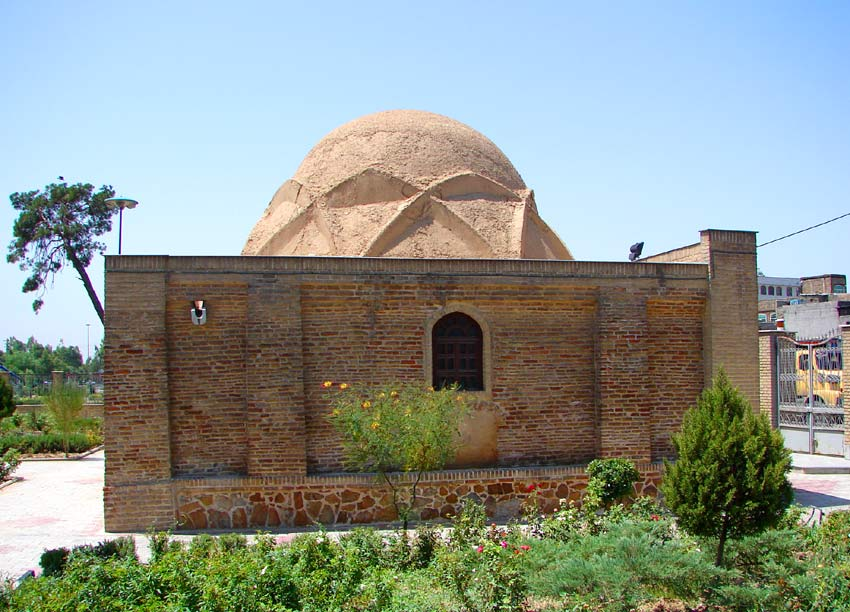
The mausoleum from the exterior

== See also ==
- Shia Islam in Iran
- Javanmard-e-Ghassab Metro Station
- List of mausoleums in Iran
