= Shahed - Bagher Shahr Metro Station =

Station of the Tehran Metro

Shahed - Bagher Shahr Metro Station ایستگاه مترو شاهد - باقرشهر
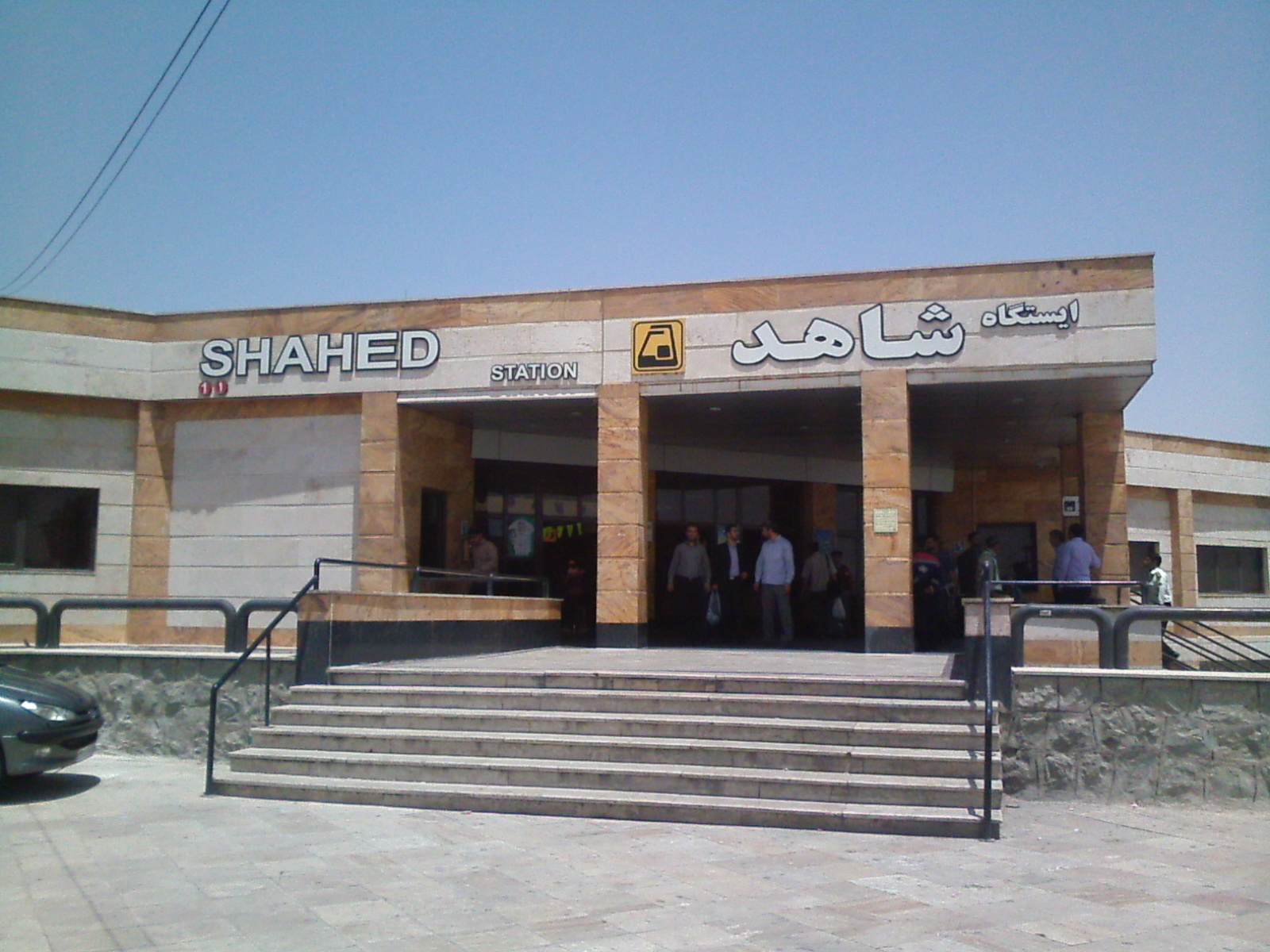

General information
- Location: Behesht-e Zahra, Tehran County; Iran
- Coordinates: 35°32′50.81″N 51°22′57.30″E
- System: Tehran Metro Station
- Operator: Tehran Urban and Suburban Railways Organization (Metro)
- Platforms: 2 Side Platforms
- Tracks: 2
- Connections: Tehran Buses: 435 Shahed Metro-Shahrak-e Aftab; Eslamshahr City Buses: Eslamshahr-Shahed; Vavan-Shahed (Special)

Construction
- Structure type: Underground
- Depth: Shallow
- Parking: Yes

History
- Opened: 1386 H-Kh (2007)

Services
Preceding station	Tehran Metro	Following station
Palayeshgah towards Tajrish	Line 1	Haram-e Motahhar-e Emam Khomeini towards Kahrizak
Terminus	Line 1	Shahr-e Aftab towards Shahr-e Forudgahi-e Imam Khomeini
Location

Shahed - Bagher Shahr Metro Station is a station in Tehran Metro Line 1. It is between Haram-e Motahhar Metro Station and Palayeshgah Metro Station. It is located north of Behesht-e Zahra beside Northern Behesht-e Zahra Expressway.

The station was formerly called Shahed but the name was changed along with the name of Palayeshgah Metro Station, formerly known simply as Baghershahr, on 26 August 2017. The reason was that this station, even though not named after the town Baqershahr, is only 0.8 km (0.50 mi) away from the city limit, whereas the other station is 3.3 km (2.1 mi) away from town limit, but only 1 km (0.62 mi) away from Tehran Refinery, after which it is now named.
