= Molavi Metro Station =

Metro station in Tehran, Iran

Molavi Metro Station ایستگاه مترو مولوی

General information
- Location: Molavi St. at Mostafa Khomeini St. and Saheb Jam' St., District 12, Tehran; Tehran Province, Iran
- Coordinates: 35.6693134°N 51.4285005°E
- System: Tehran Metro Station
- Operator: Tehran Urban and Suburban Railways Organization (Metro)
- Connections: Tehran BRT: BRT 2

History
- Opened: 2 Dey 1398 H-Sh (23 December 2019)

Services
Preceding station	Tehran Metro	Following station
Meydan-e Ghiam towards Varzeshgah-e Takhti	Line 7	Meydan-e Mohammadiyeh towards Meydan-e Ketab
Location

Molavi Metro Station is a station in Tehran Metro Line 7. It is located at the intersection of Molavi Street and Mostafa Khomeini, also known as Molavi Intersection. The station is at the southeastern edge of Tehran Bazaar, and near Shahid Akbarabadi Hospital.
