= Shahid Mofatteh =

Shahid Mofatteh (transl. Martyr Mofatteh) may refer to the following named after assassinated Iranian cleric Mohammad Mofatteh:

- Shahid Mofatteh, Iran, a village in Khuzestan Province
- Shahid Mofatteh Stadium, a stadium in Hamedan, Iran
- Shahid Mofatteh Metro Station (disambiguation)
  - Shahid Mofatteh Metro Station (Tehran), a station in Tehran
