= Javanmard-e-Ghassab Metro Station =

Station of the Tehran Metro

Javanmard-e Ghassab Metro Station ایستگاه مترو جوانمرد قصاب

General information
- Location: Dastvareh Boulevard; District 20, Tehran, Ray County; Iran
- Coordinates: 35°37′7.18″N 51°25′7.45″E
- System: Tehran Metro Station
- Operator: Tehran Urban and Suburban Railways Organization (Metro)
- Platforms: Side platform
- Tracks: 2
- Connections: Tehran BRT: BRT 9; Tehran Buses: 245 Rahahan-Naziabad-Shahr-e Rey Metro; 373 Khani Abad-e Now - Ali Abad Metro; 380 Shahrak-e Vesal- Ali Abad Metro; 410 Shokufeh- Ali Abad Metro

Construction
- Structure type: Surface
- Platform levels: 1
- Parking: Yes

History
- Opened: 1381 H-Kh (2002)

Services
Preceding station	Tehran Metro	Following station
Aliabad towards Tajrish	Line 1	Shahr-e-Rey towards Kahrizak
Location

Javanmard-e-Ghassab Metro Station is a station in Tehran Metro Line 1. It is located in Shahid Dastvareh Boulevard. It is between Shahr-e-Rey Metro Station and Ali Abad Metro Station.
