= Paramount Crossroads =

Coordinates: 29.619865°N 52.528500°E

Paramount Crossroads (Persian: چهارراه پارامونت, Cahârrâh-e Pârâmont), also known as 15 Khordad Crossroads (Persian: چهارراه پانزده خرداد, Cahârrâh-e Pânzdah-e Xordâd), is a major intersection in a heavily traveled and central area in Shiraz, Iran. It is the junction of Enqelab-e Eslami Street, Lotfali Khan Street and Qasrodasht Street. There is a fuel station docked on the intersection and Zaytoon Shopping Center is in the immediate area. The junction is often used as an assembly point for protests.

== History ==
The intersection derives its two names from the Paramount Cinema (Persian: سینما پارامونت, named after the American company Paramount Pictures) and 15 Khordad.

== Infrastructure ==
As of November 2011, the intersection has outdoor loudspeakers that are part of a system used for audio broadcasts across the city.

== Demonstrations ==
As per the International Quran News Agency, in 2009, demonstrators rallied in support of the Palestinian people at the intersection. As per the International Quran News Agency, Ministry of Economic Affairs and Finance, Jamejam and the Iranian Students News Agency; in 2010 and 2011, it was selected as the venue for a march held in commemoration of the Iranian Revolution's 30th and 31st anniversaries, respectively. As per Khabar Farsi, Islamic Republic of Iran Broadcasting, the Islamic Republic News Agency, and the Shiraz News Agency; in 2011, it was the site of Quds Day rallies.

== Transportation ==
=== Streets ===
- Enqelab-e Eslami Street
- Lotfali Khan Street
- Qasroddasht Street

=== Buses ===
- Route 4
- Route 18
- Route 90
- Route 91
- Route 155
