= Ebrahim Raisi Expressway =

Road in Tehran, Iran

Ebrahim Raisi Expressway
- بزرگراه ابراهیم رئیسی
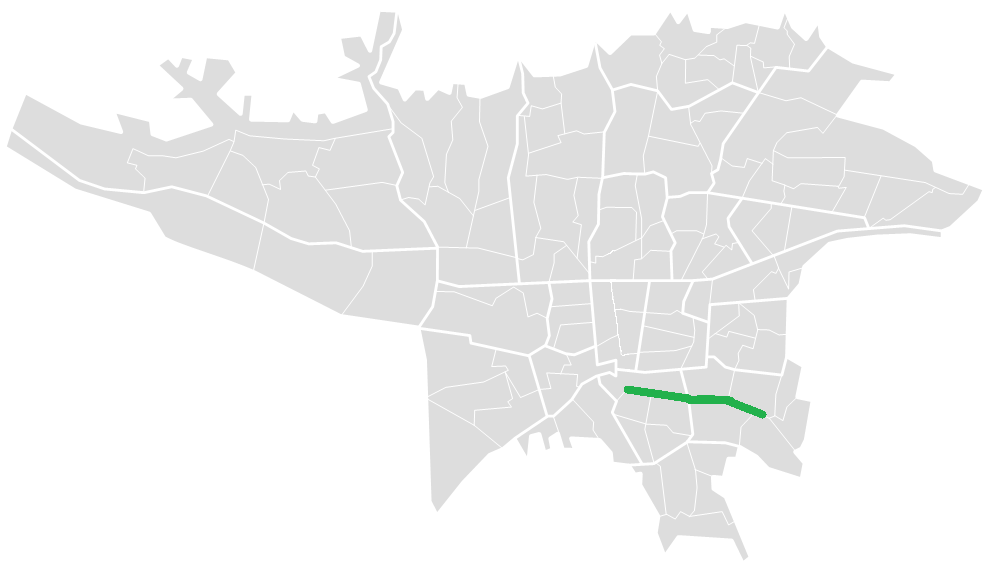

Route information
- Length: 7.2 km (4.5 mi)

Major junctions
- East end: Azadegan Expressway
- West end: Bahman Square

Location
- Country: Iran
- Major cities: Tehran

Highway system
- Highways in Iran; Freeways

Ebrahim Raisi Expressway (Persian: بزرگراه آیت الله ابراهیم رئیسی) is an expressway in southern Tehran. It is from Basij Mostazafin Interchange to Besat Square and it passes Tehran southern Bus Terminal.

From East to West
	Azadegan Expressway
	Emam Reza Street
	17 Shahrivar Street
	Fadayian Eslam Street; Borujerdi Street
	Bokharaei Street
Tehran Southern Bus Terminal
Terminal-e Jonub Metro Station
	Rajaei Boulevard
Bahman Square	Tondguyan Expressway; Yadegar-e-Emam Expressway Southern Expansion
From West to East
