= Shush Street =

Street in Tehran, Iran

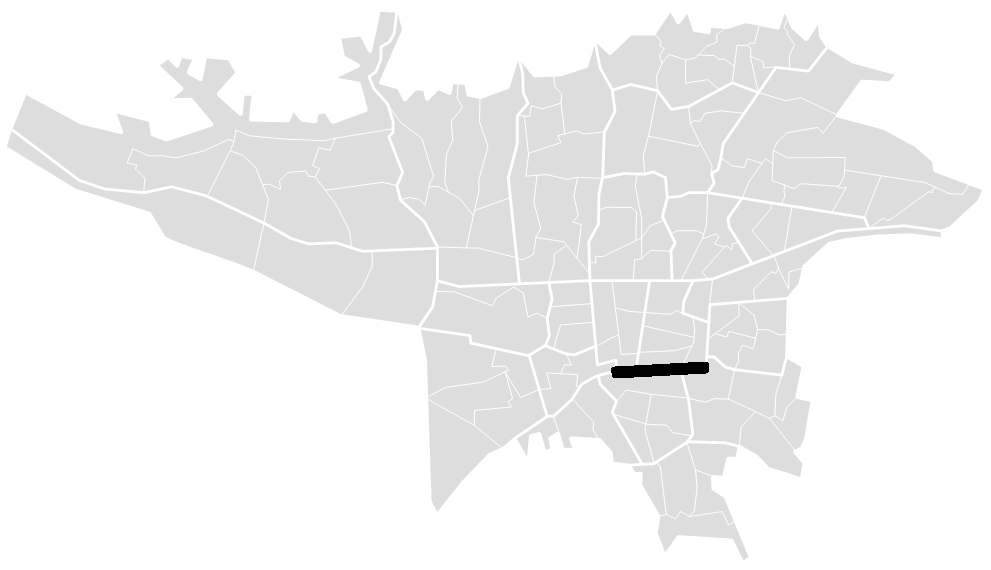
- Interactive map of Shush Street
- Native name: خیابان شوش (Persian)
- Length: 4.75 km (2.95 mi)
- Location: Tehran
- East end: 17 Shahrivar Street
- West end: Yadegar-e-Emam Expressway Expansion

Shush Street (Persian: خیابان شوش, romanized: Khiābān Shush) is a street in southern central Tehran, Iran.

From East to West
| | 17 Shahrivar Street |
| | Rajabnia Street |
| Shush Square | Razmara Sepahbod Street; Rey Street; Cyrus street |
| | Bokharaei Street |
| | Khayyam Street |
Shush Metro Station
| | Rajai Boulevard; Takhti Street |
| Rahahan Square | Valiasr Street; Kargar Street |
| | Behdari Street; Anbar-e-Naft Street |
| | Yadegar-e-Emam Expressway Expansion |
From West to East
