= Shahr-e Aftab Metro Station =

Metro station in Tehran, Iran

Shahr-e Aftab Metro Station ایستگاه مترو شهر آفتاب
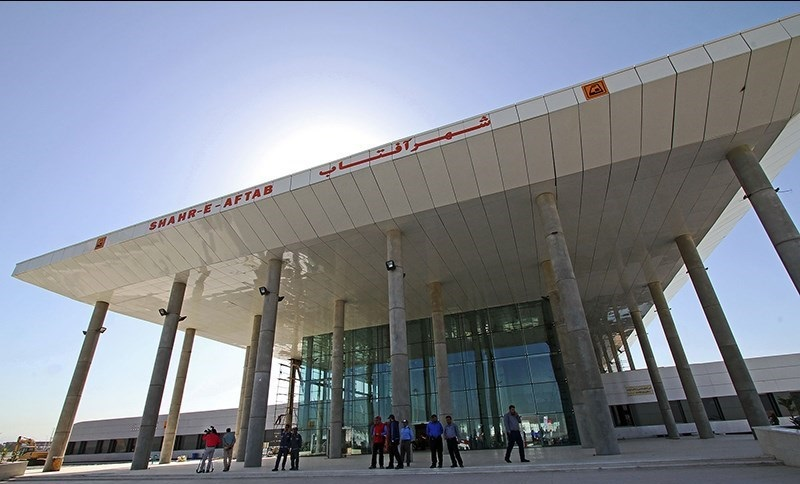

General information
- Location: Aftab Rural District, Tehran County; Tehran Province, Iran
- Coordinates: 35°32′44″N 51°21′57″E
- System: Tehran Metro Station
- Operator: Tehran Urban and Suburban Railways Organization (Metro)
- Platforms: Island Platform
- Connections: Tehran Buses: 425 Khavaran Term.-Shahr-e Aftab; 426 Resalat Sq.-Shahr-e Aftab; 427 Azadi Term.-Shahr-e Aftab; 428 San'at Sq.-Shahr-e Aftab; 429 Terminal-e Jonub-Shahr-e Aftab; 430 Rahahan-Shahr-e Aftab; 431 Beyhaghi Term.-Shahr-e Aftab; 432 Shahed Metro-Shahr-e Aftab; 433 Sarvari Term.-Shahr-e Aftab

Construction
- Structure type: Underground

History
- Opened: 30 Farvardin 1395 H-Sh (18 April 2016)

Services
Preceding station	Tehran Metro	Following station
Shahed - Bagher Shahr Terminus	Line 1	Shahr-e Forudgahi-e Imam Khomeini towards Shahr-e Parand
Location

Shahr-e Aftab Metro Station is a station in Tehran Metro Line 1. It is located in Aftab Rural District, near Behesht-e Zahra. The station serves Shahr-e Aftab Expo and Shahed University. The next station is on one end Shahed - Bagher Shahr Metro Station, towards Tehran city centre, and the other end Shahr-e Forudgahi-e Imam Khomeini Metro Station.
