= 1963 demonstrations in Iran =

1963 public backlash in Pahlavi-dynasty Iran

15 Khordad incident
- Part of the prelude to the Iranian Revolution
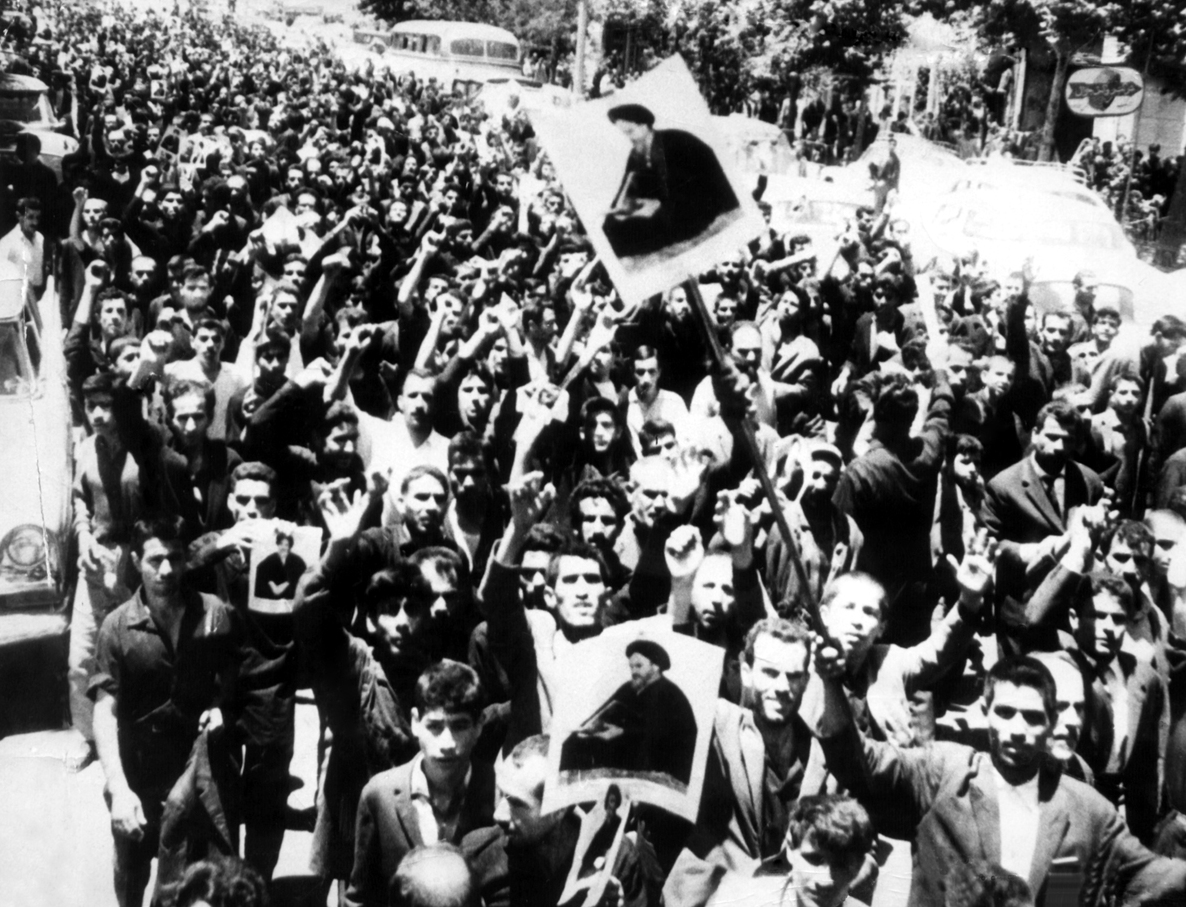
- People of Tehran in the demonstrations with pictures of Ruhollah Khomeini in their hands.
- Date: 5 June 1963
- Location: Tehran and Qom, Iran
- Result: Protests suppressed

Parties
Islamic Coalition; Freedom Movement	Imperial State of Iran; • Shahrbani; • SAVAK; • Imperial Iranian Army

The demonstrations of 5 and 6 June, also called the events of June 1963 or (using the Iranian calendar) the 15 Khordad protests (Persian: تظاهرات پانزده خرداد), were protests in Iran against the arrest of Ruhollah Khomeini after his denouncement of the Shah, Mohammad Reza Pahlavi, and Israel. Although the protests were crushed within days by the police and military, the events established the importance and power of (Shia) religious opposition to the Shah, and Ayatollah Khomeini as a major political and religious leader. Fifteen years later, Khomeini led the Iranian Revolution which overthrew the Shah and the Imperial State of Iran and established the Islamic Republic of Iran.

== Background ==
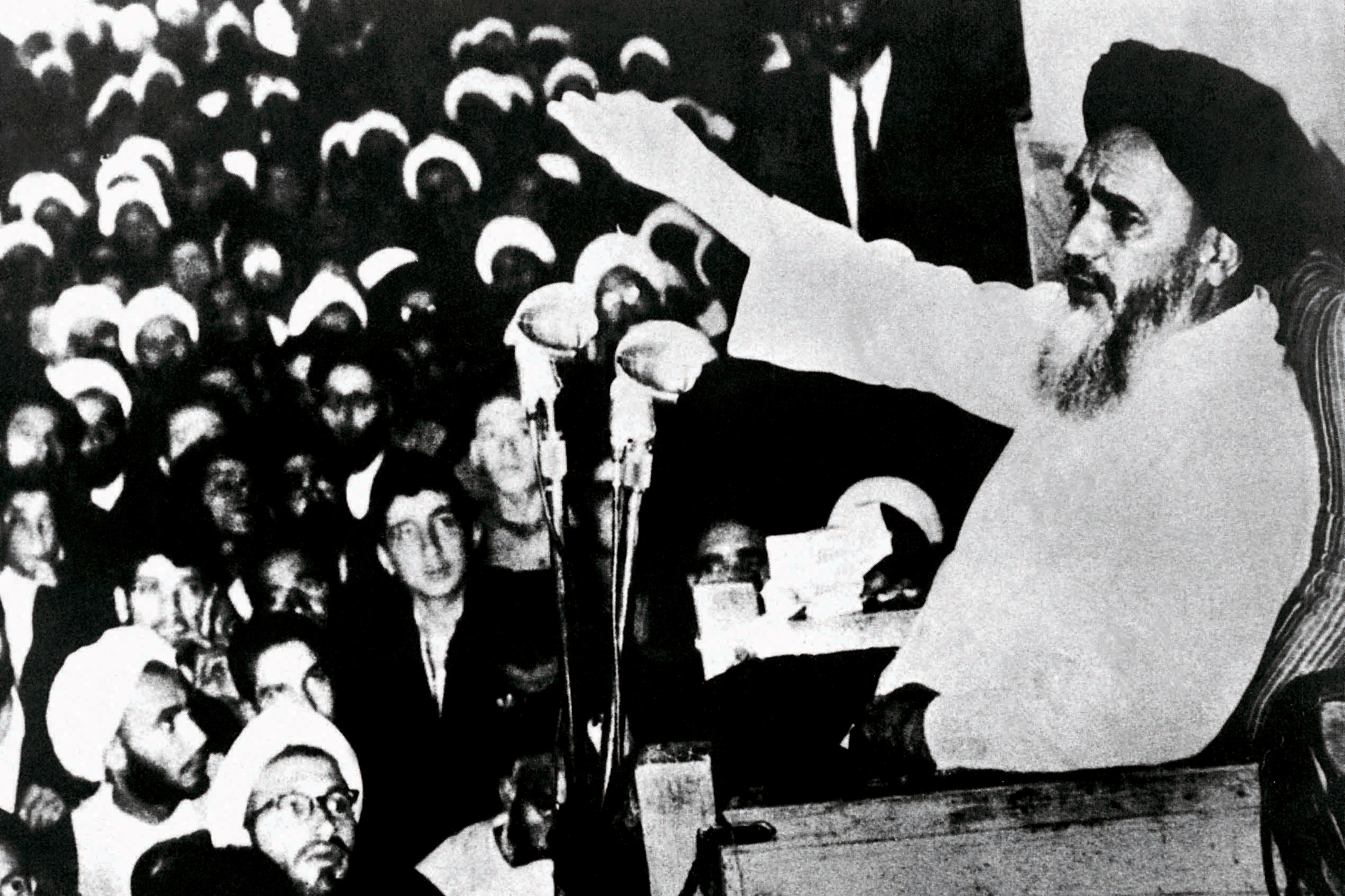
Khomeini speaking in Qom and criticizing the Shah's government

In 1963, Mohammad Reza Pahlavi, the Shah of Iran, started several programs which were known as "the Revolution of the Shah and the People" or the White Revolution. It was referred to as white due to it being a bloodless revolution. These plans were to make social and economic changes in Iran. Therefore, on 26 January 1963, the Shah held a national referendum for 19 rules of the White Revolution. The rules of this revolution were land reforms, nationalization of the forests and pastureland, privatization of the government owned enterprises, profit sharing, extending the right to vote to women, formation of the literacy corps, formation of the health corps, formation of the reconstruction and development corps, formation of the houses of equity, nationalization of all water resources, urban and rural modernization and reconstruction, didactic reforms, workers' right to own shares in the industrial complexes, price stabilization, free and compulsory education, free food for needy mothers, introduction of social security and national insurance, stable and reasonable cost of renting or buying of residential properties, and introduction of measures to fight against corruption.

The Shah announced this revolution as a way towards modernization. Additionally, other sources believe that the Shah could legitimise the Pahlavi dynasty through the White Revolution. The revolution caused a deep rift between Mohammad Reza Pahlavi and Iranian Shia religious scholars, Ulama. They claimed these changes were a serious threat to Islam. Ruhollah Khomeini was one of the objectors who held a meeting with other Maraji and scholars in Qom and boycotted the referendum of the revolution. On 22 January 1963, Khomeini issued a worded declaration denouncing the Shah and his plans. Khomeini continued his denunciation of the Shah's programs, issuing a manifesto that also bore the signatures of eight other senior religious scholars. In it he listed the various ways in which the Shah had violated the constitution, condemned the spread of moral corruption in the country, and accused the Shah of submission to the U.S. and Israel. He also decreed that the Nowruz celebrations for the Iranian year 1342 (which fell on 21 March 1963) be canceled as a sign of protest against government policies.

== Events ==
=== Khomeini's sermon and arrest ===
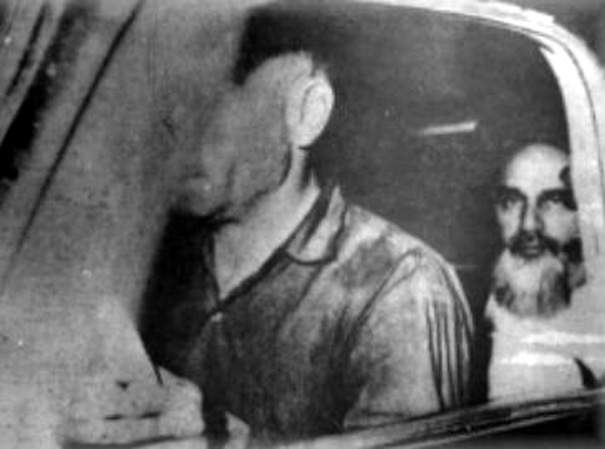
Photo believed to be of Khomeini's arrest in 1963

On the afternoon of 3 June 1963, Ashura, Khomeini delivered a speech at the Feyziyeh School in which he drew parallels between the Umayyad Caliph Yazid I and the Shah. He denounced the Shah as a "wretched, miserable man", and warned him that if he did not change his ways the day would come when the people would offer up thanks for his departure from the country. In Tehran, a Muharram march of Khomeini supporters estimated at 100,000 marched past the Shah's palace, chanting "Death to the Dictator, death to the dictator! God save you, Khomeini! Death to the bloodthirsty enemy!"

Two days later at three o'clock in the morning, security men and commandos descended on Khomeini's home in Qom and arrested him. They hastily transferred him to the Qasr Prison in Tehran.

=== Uprising ===
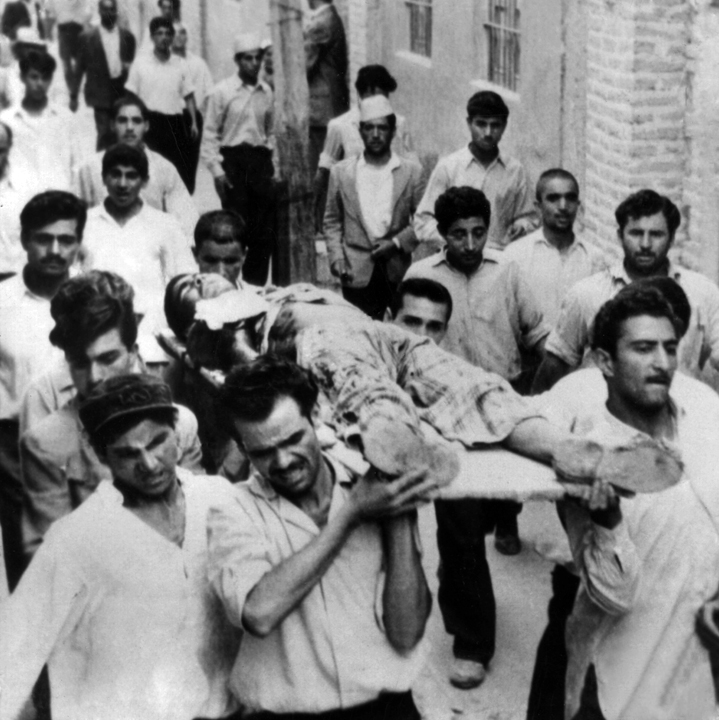
Protesters carrying the body of one of the victims

As dawn broke on 5 June, the news of his arrest spread first through Qom and then in other cities. In Qom, Tehran, Shiraz, Mashhad and Varamin, masses of angry demonstrators were confronted by tanks and paratroopers. In Tehran, demonstrators attacked police stations, SAVAK offices and government buildings, including ministries. The surprised government declared martial law and a curfew from 10 p.m. to 5 a.m. The Shah then ordered a division of the Imperial Guard, under the command of Major General Gholam Ali Oveissi, to move into the city and crush the demonstrations. The following day, protest groups took to the street in smaller numbers and were confronted by tanks and "soldiers in combat gear with shoot-to-kill orders". The village of Pishva near Varamin became famous during the uprising. Several hundred villagers from Pishva began marching to Tehran, shouting "Khomeini or Death". They were stopped at a railroad bridge by soldiers who opened fire with machine guns when the villagers refused to disperse and attacked the soldiers "with whatever they had". Whether "tens or hundreds" were killed is "unclear". It was not until six days later that order was fully restored.

According to journalist Baqer Moin, police files indicate 320 people from a wide variety of backgrounds, including 30 leading clerics, were arrested on 5 June. The files also list 380 people as killed or wounded in the uprising, not including those who did not go to hospital "for fear of arrest", or who were taken to the morgue or buried by security forces.

=== Khomeini's release ===
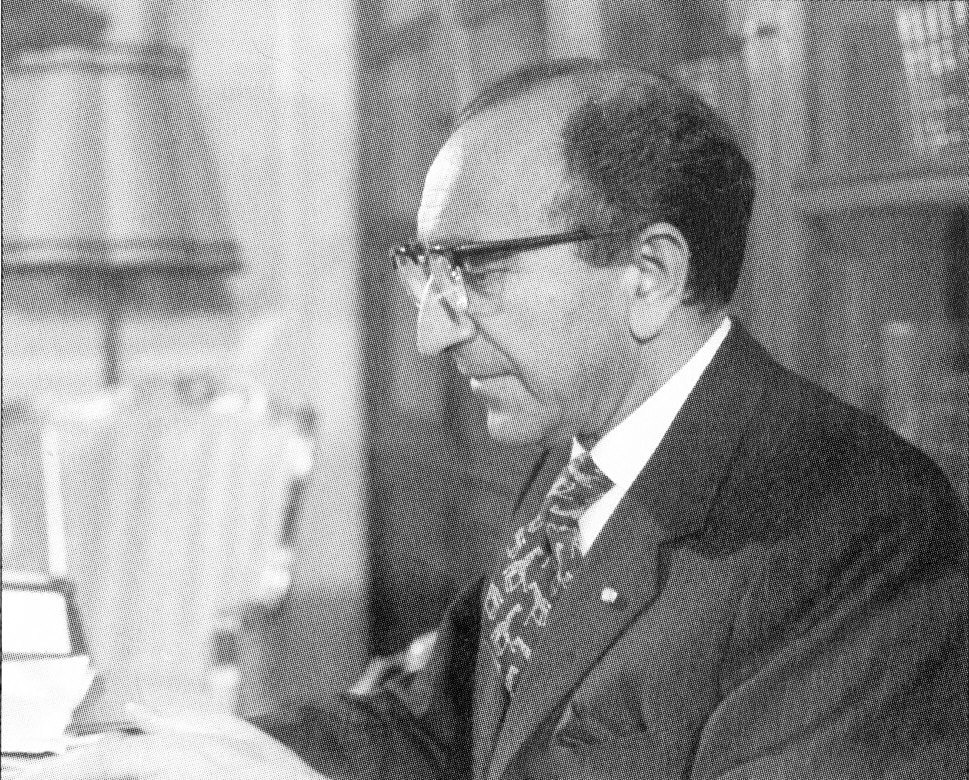
Then Prime Minister Asadollah Alam was a supporter of Khomeini's arrest

Hardliners in the regime, such as Prime Minister Asadollah Alam and SAVAK head Nematollah Nassiri, favoured Khomeini's execution as the one responsible for the riots, as well as the less-violent strikes and protests continuing in the bazaars and elsewhere. Fateme Pakravan – wife of Hassan Pakravan, chief of SAVAK – says in her memoirs that her husband saved Khomeini's life in 1963. Pakravan felt that his execution would anger the common people of Iran. He presented his argument to the Shah. Once he had convinced the Shah to allow him to find a way out, he called on Ayatollah Mohammad Kazem Shariatmadari, one of the senior religious leaders of Iran, and asked for his help. Shariatmadari suggested that Khomeini be declared a Marja. So, other Marjas made a religious decree which was taken by Pakravan and Seyyed Jalal Tehrani to the Shah. After nineteen days in the Qasr Prison, Khomeini was moved first to the Eshratabad military base and then to a house in the Davoodiyeh neighbourhood of Tehran where he was kept under surveillance. He was released on 7 April 1964, and returned to Qom.

== After the revolution ==
The date of 15 Khordad is widely noted throughout the Islamic Republic of Iran. Among other places, the intersection known as 15 Khordad Crossroads, a 15th of Khordad Metro Station are named after it. Coincidentally, Khomeini died twenty-six years later in 1989, on the eve of 15 Khordad.
