= Shahid Mofatteh Metro Station (Tehran) =

Station of the Tehran Metro

Shahid Mofatteh ایستگاه مترو شهید مفتح

General information
- Location: Mofatteh Street- Ostad Motahari Street; District 7, Tehran, Tehran County; Tehran Province, Iran
- Coordinates: 35°43′28″N 51°25′40″E
- System: Tehran Metro Station
- Operator: Tehran Urban and Suburban Railways Organization (Metro)
- Connections: Tehran Buses: 212 Beheshti Term. - Imam Hossein Sq.; 228 Beheshti Term. - Imam Khomeini H.; 302 Beheshti Term. - Artesh Blvd.

History
- Opened: 1380 H-Kh (2001)

Services
Preceding station	Tehran Metro	Following station
Shahid Beheshti towards Tajrish	Line 1	Shohada-ye Haftom-e Tir towards Kahrizak
Location

Mofatteh Metro Station is a station in Tehran Metro Line 1. It is located in the junction of Dr. Mofatteh Street and Ostad Motehari Street. It is between Haft-e-Tir Metro Station and Shahid Beheshti Metro Station.
