= Grand Bazaar, Tehran =

Marketplace in Iran

Grand Bazaar of Tehran
- بازار بزرگ
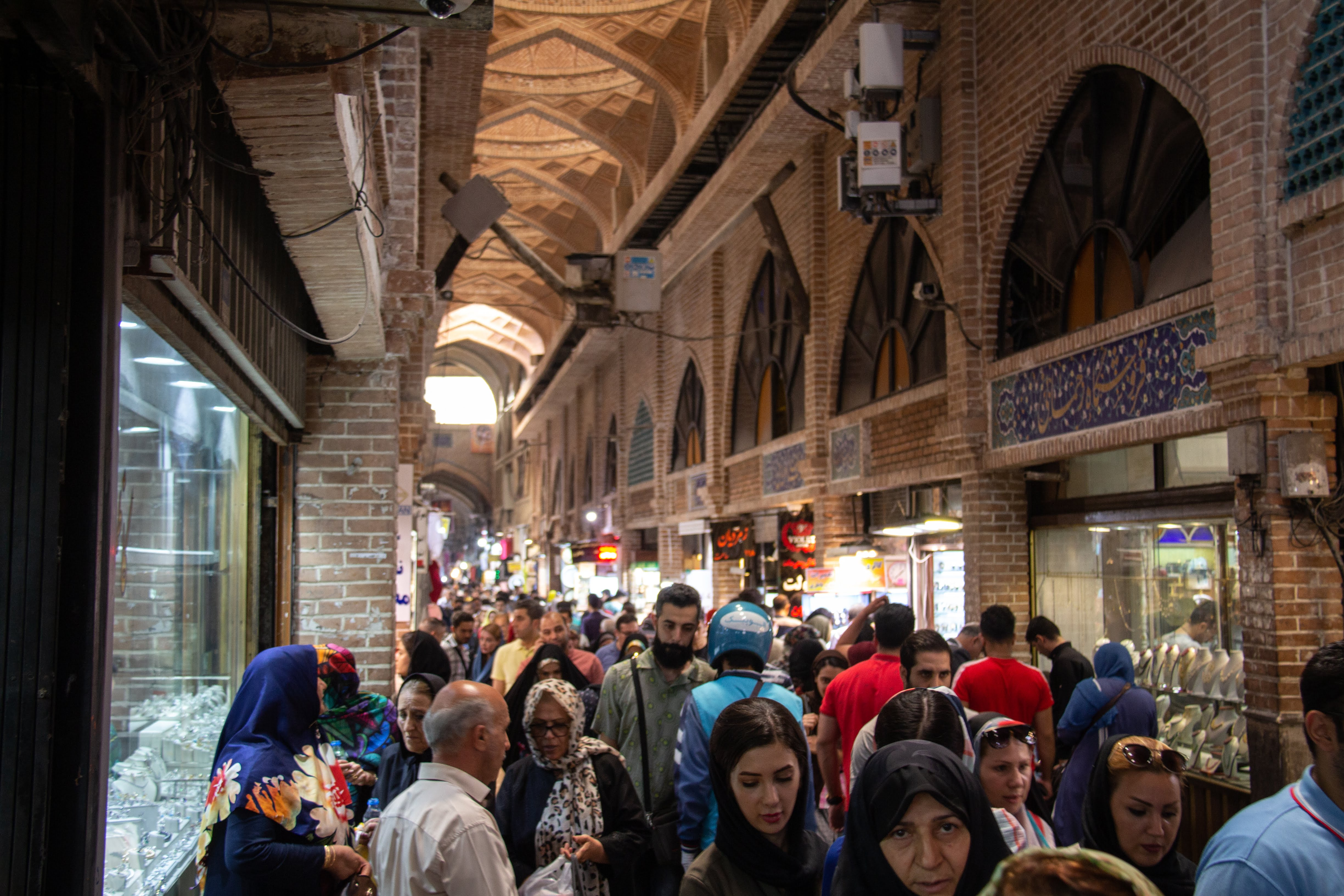
- Inside the Grand Bazaar of Tehran
- Interactive map of the Grand Bazaar of Tehran area

General information
- Type: Bazaar
- Architectural style: Safavid; Zand; Qajar
- Location: Central Tehran, Tehran province, Iran
- Coordinates: 35°40′30″N 51°25′10″E

Iran National Heritage List
- Official name: Grand Bazaar, Tehran
- Type: Built
- Designated: 24 October 1977
- Reference no.: 1540
- Conservation organization: Cultural Heritage, Handicrafts and Tourism Organization of Iran

The Grand Bazaar (Persian: بازار بزرگ, romanized: Bāzār-e Bozorg) is a bazaar, located in Central Tehran, Iran. Split into several corridors that are over 10 kilometres (6.2 mi) in length, each specializing in different types of goods, the bazaar has several entrances, with Sabze Meydan being the main entrance.

In addition to shops, it contains mosques, guest houses, and banks. It has access to the rapid transit system of the Tehran Metro through the stations of Khayam and Khordad 15th. The bazaar was added to the Iran National Heritage List on 24 October 1977, administered by the Cultural Heritage, Handicrafts and Tourism Organization of Iran.

== History ==
=== Trade and early markets in Tehran ===
It is hard to say exactly when the bazaar first appeared, but in the centuries after the Muslim conquest of Iran between 632 and 654 CE, travelers reported the growth of commerce in the area now occupied by the current bazaar.

Research indicates that a portion of today's bazaar predated the growth of the village of Tehran by the Safavid era, although it was during and after this period that the bazaar began to grow gradually. Western travelers reported that, by 1660 CE and beyond, the bazaar area had still been largely open and only partially covered.

=== Development ===
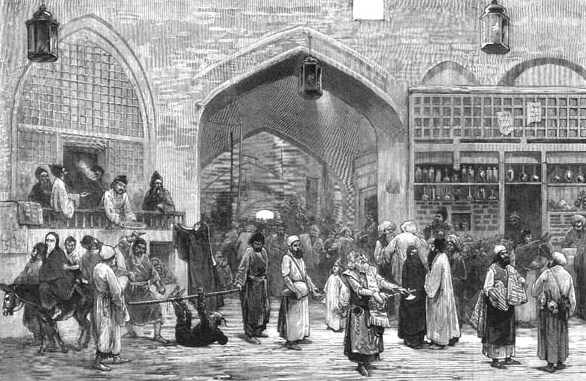
An 1873 illustration of the Grand Bazaar of Tehran

Much of the bazaar itself was constructed much later. However, under the reign of Reza Shah, as Tehran began to grow and reform exponentially in the early 20th century, the changes brought by this rapid development saw much of the bazaar disappear. The old sections of the bazaar are generally similar in their architectural style, while the parts added in the 20th century often look different. Critics say that little consideration had been given to the construction of these new sections.

=== Bazaari ===
The bazaar is viewed as a force of conservatism in the Iranian society, providing strong links between the clergy and the middle class traders. The 1979 Iranian Revolution received strong backing from these forces, and the Grand Bazaar of Tehran was a center for pro-revolutionary feeling and finance.

There were several reasons why the bazaar class worked hard to help advance the revolution. The government of Mohammed Reza Pahlavi was anathema to the bazaaris, who seemed set to lose out as the country was being industrialized, and they feared that they would be left behind and their status in society would be reduced. Similarly, another concern for the bazaar class, not just in Tehran but throughout Iran, was that these traditional economic forces did not benefit from the 1974–1978 oil boom, and were thus even more inclined to aid the revolution. As such, the Grand Bazaar of Tehran was a hotbed of support for the revolution, which positioned itself opposite to the monarchy.

The Grand Bazaar continues largely to support the establishment, particularly as conservative political forces often adopt a low tax, laissez-faire approach to the bazaaris. However, the 2025–2026 Iranian protests, including strikes, initially broke out on 29 December 2025 in the Grand Bazaar, at first because of the collapse of the rial, but quickly evolving into a broader movement demanding an end to the current regime.

== Gallery ==
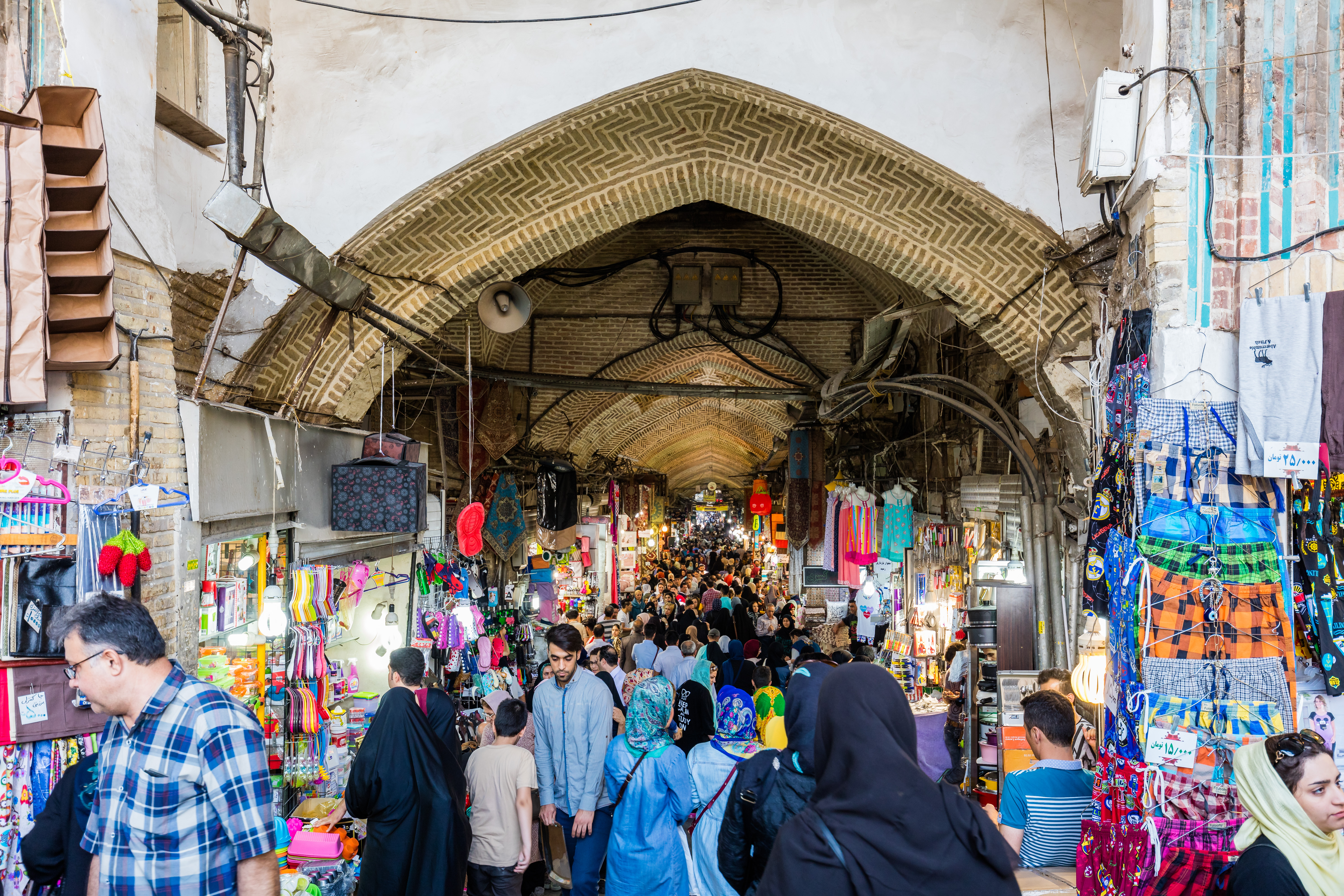
Entrance to the bazaar

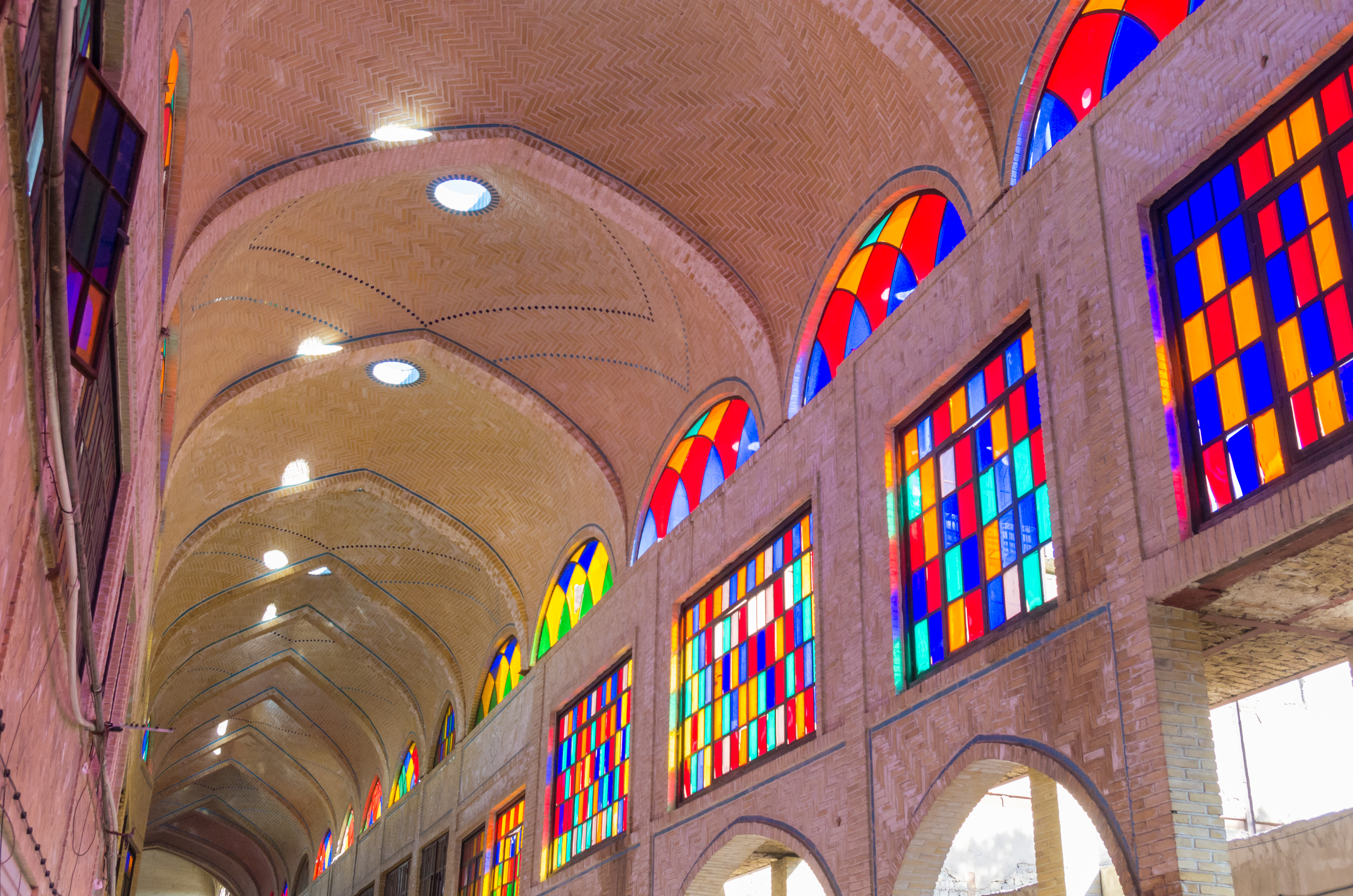
Stained glass inside the bazaar

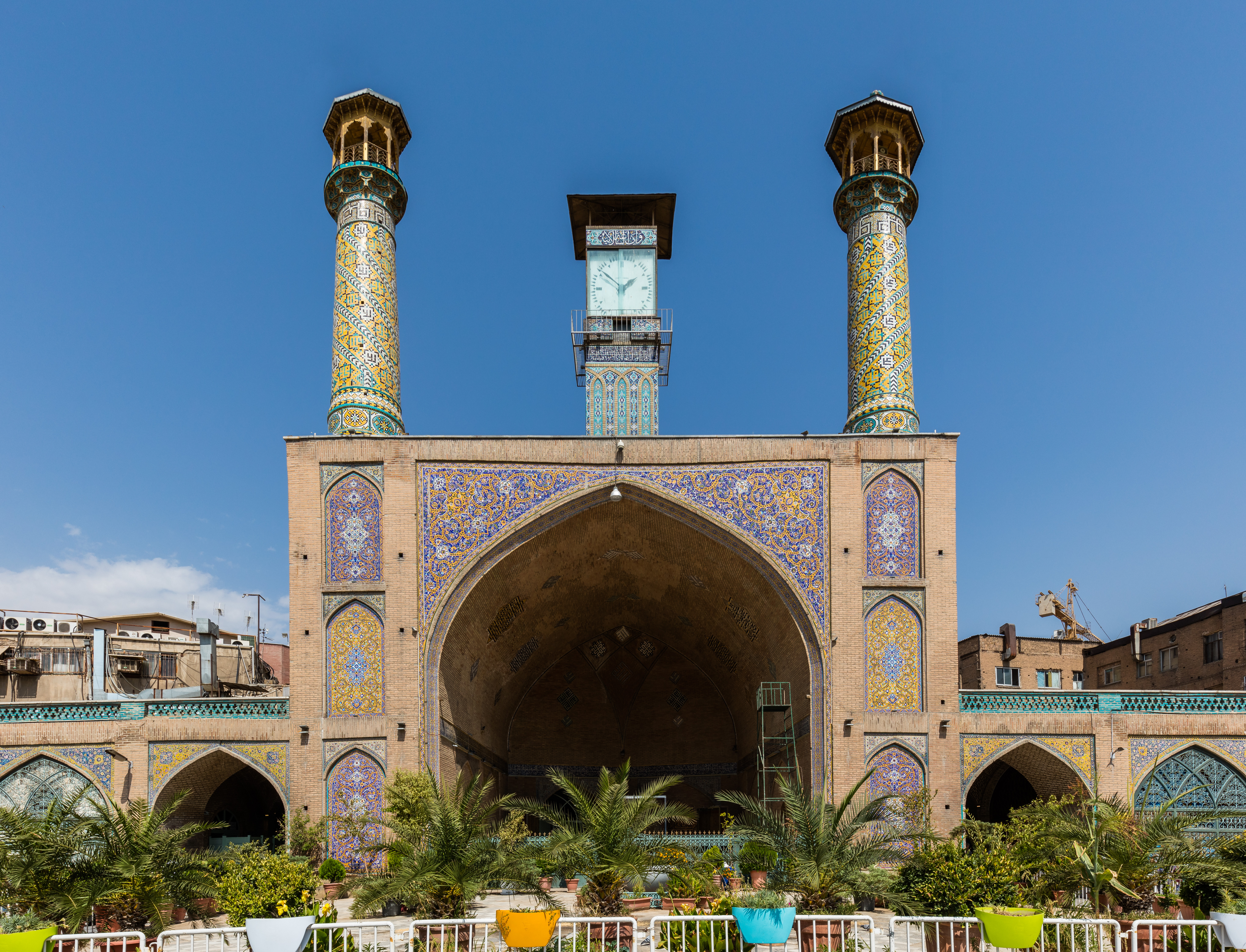
Shah Mosque is located next to the bazaar

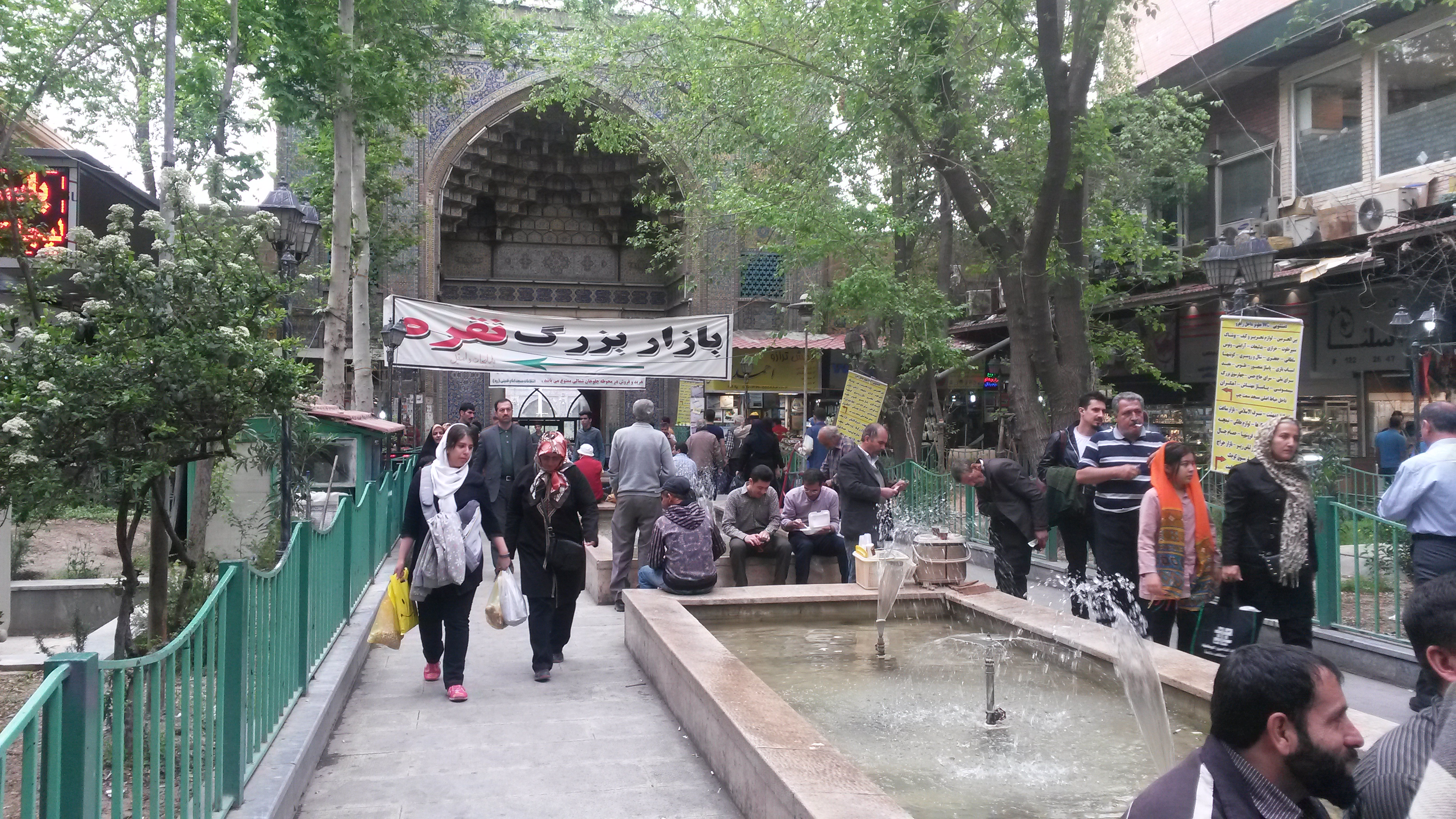
The Shah Mosque's entrance to the bazaar

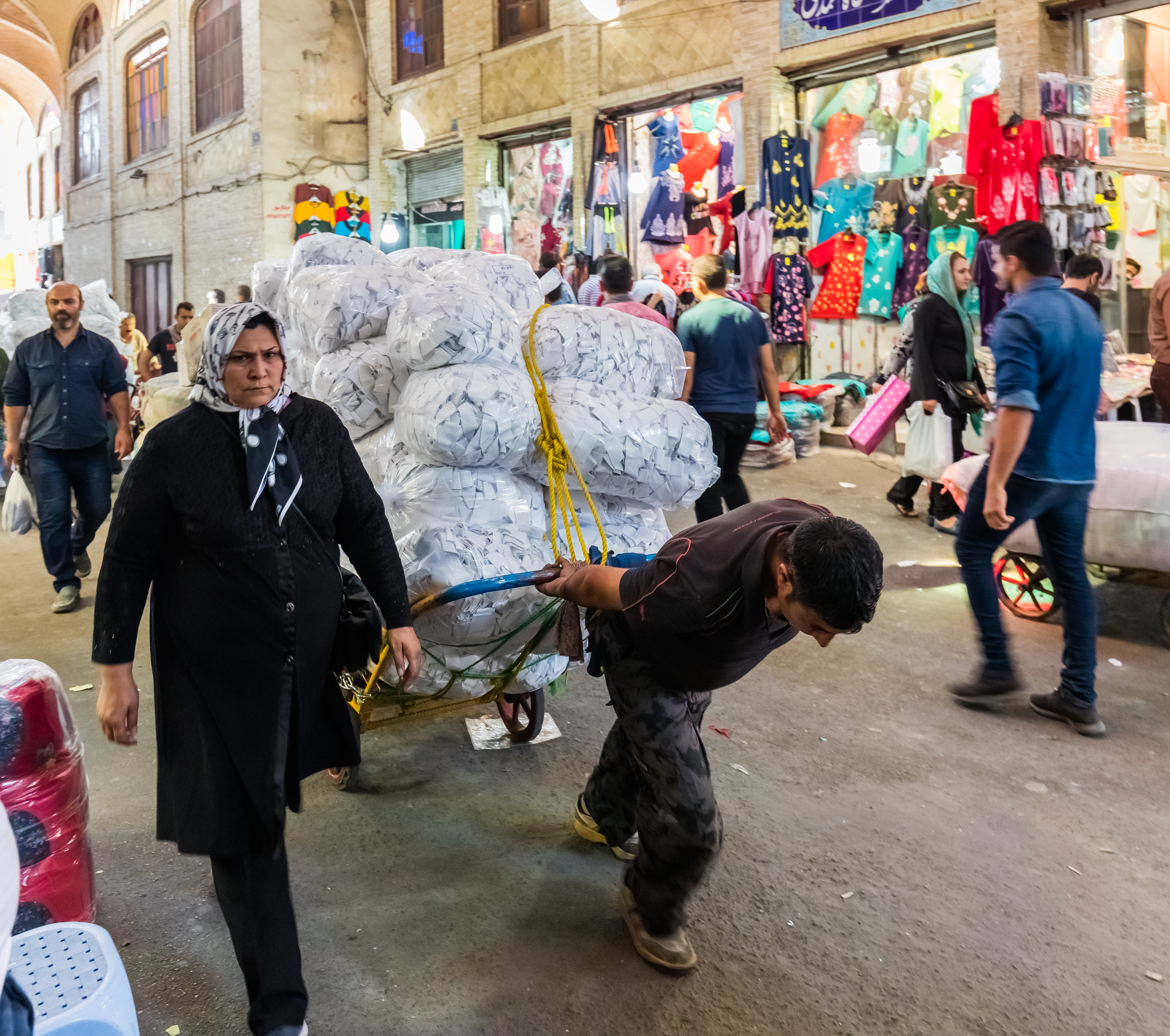
Inside a corridor at the bazaar

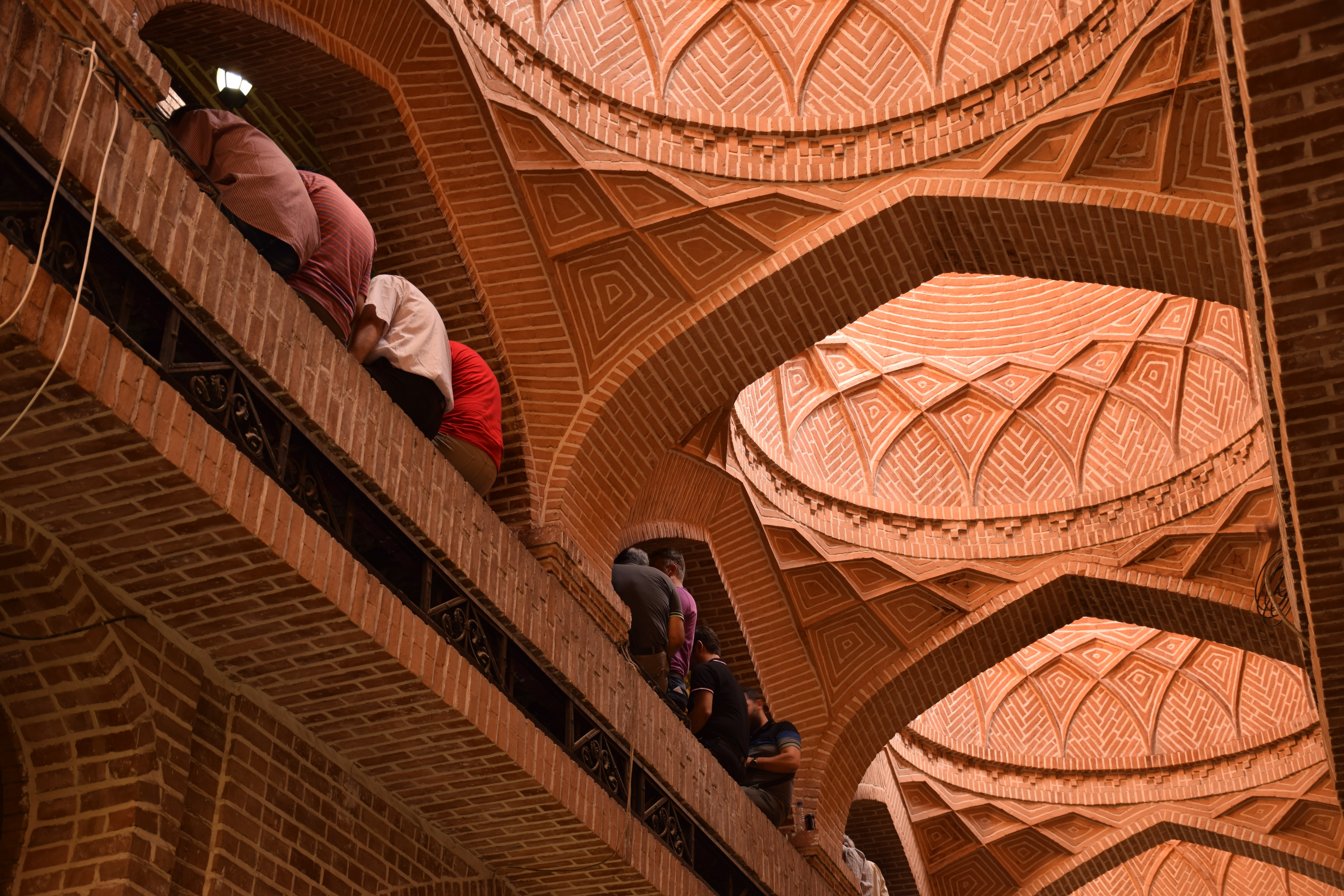
Ceilings of a corridor at the bazaar

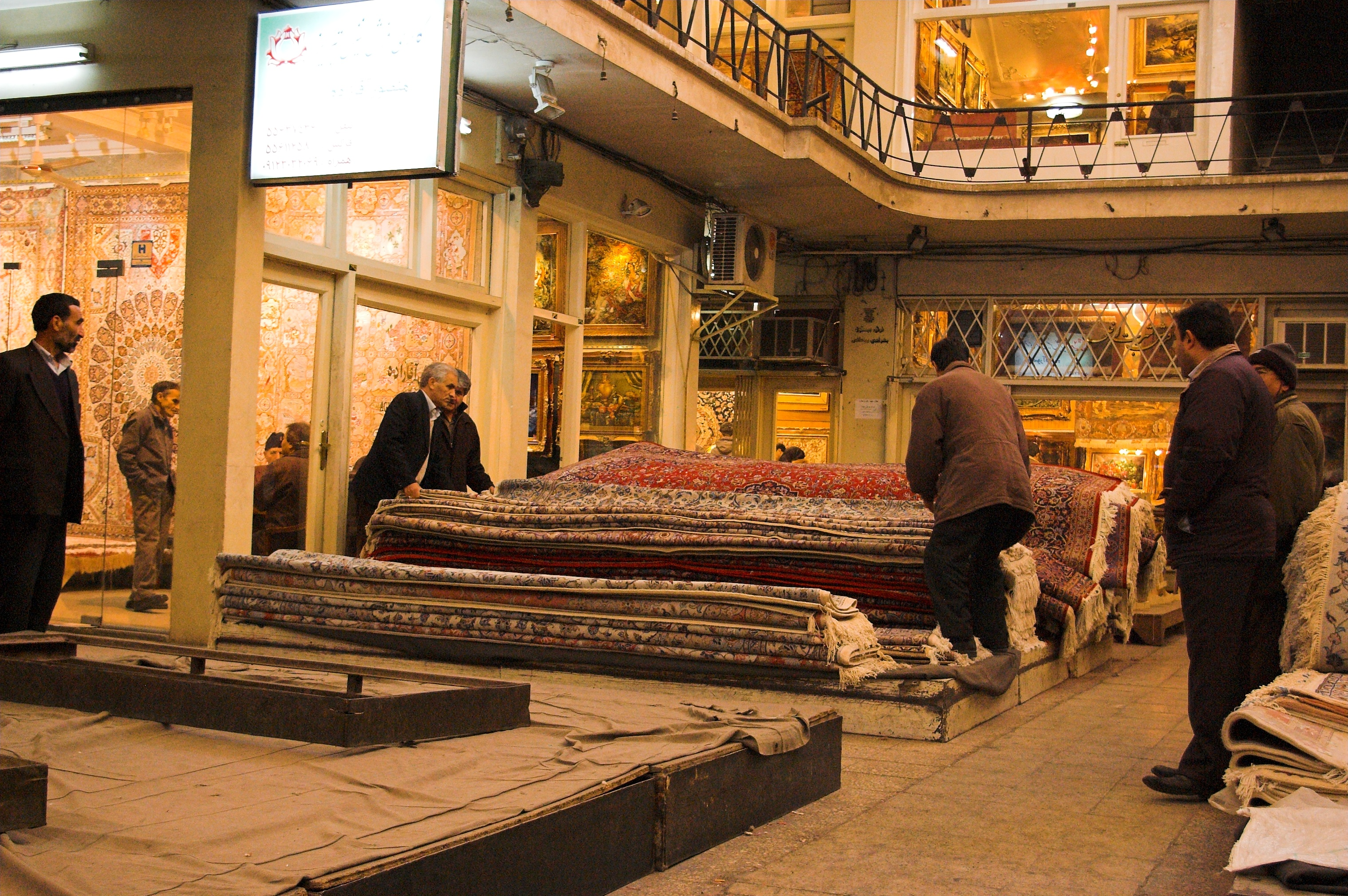
Carpet shops inside the bazaar

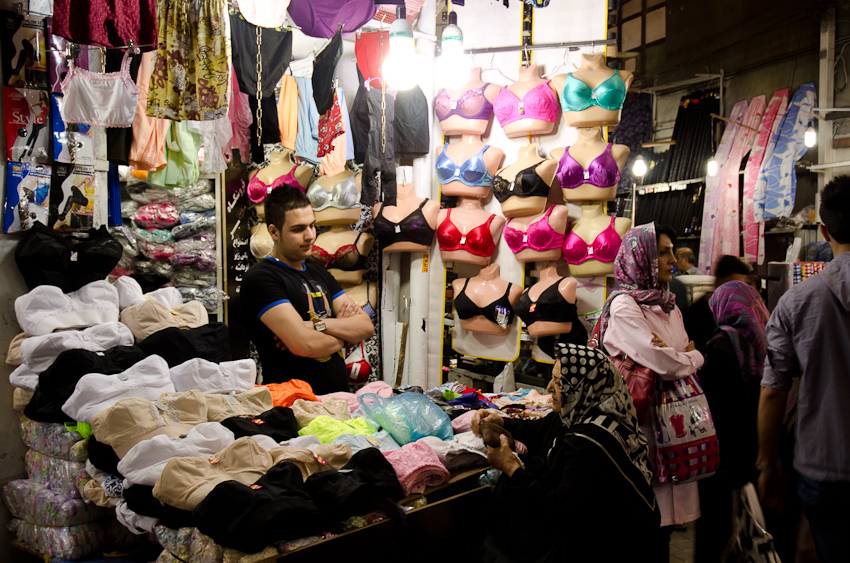
An underwear shop inside the bazaar

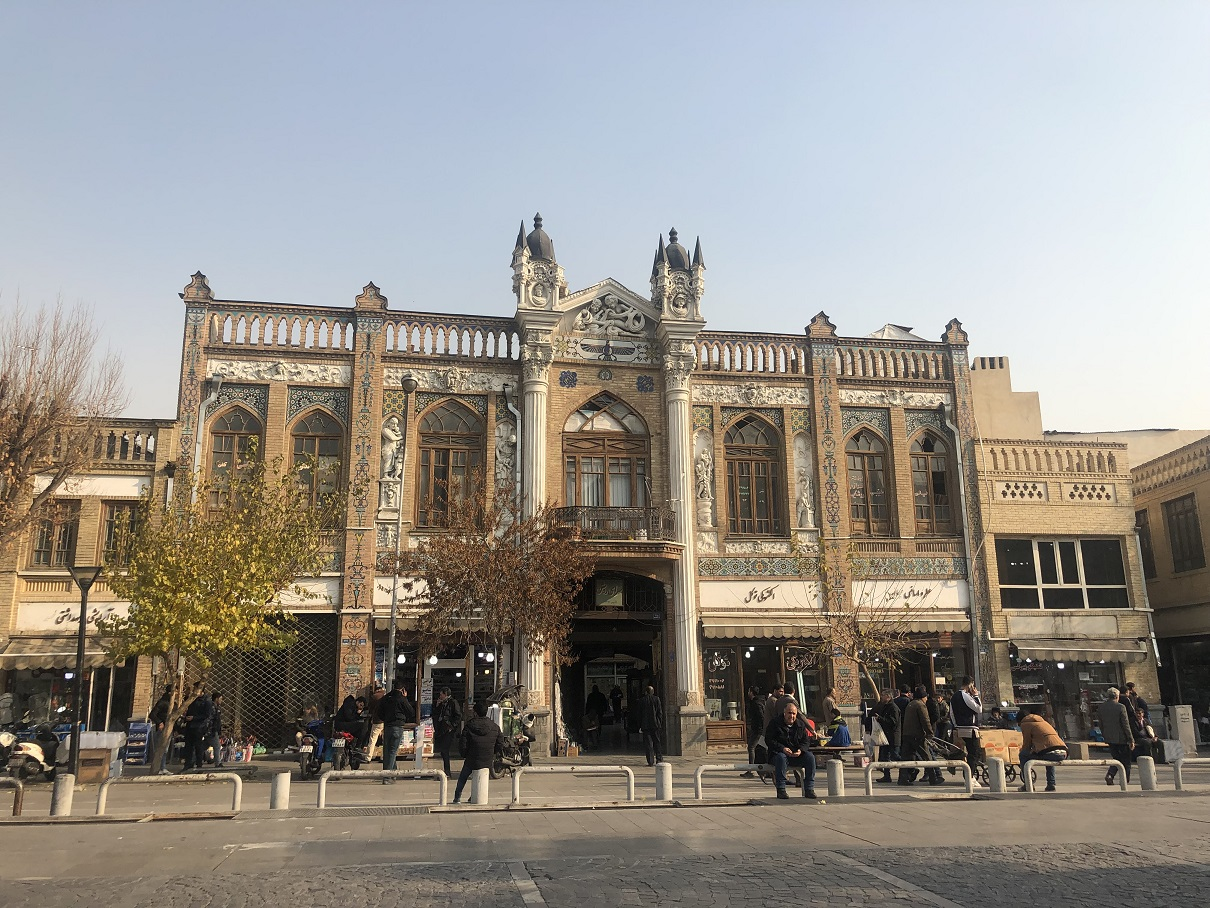
Saray Roshan

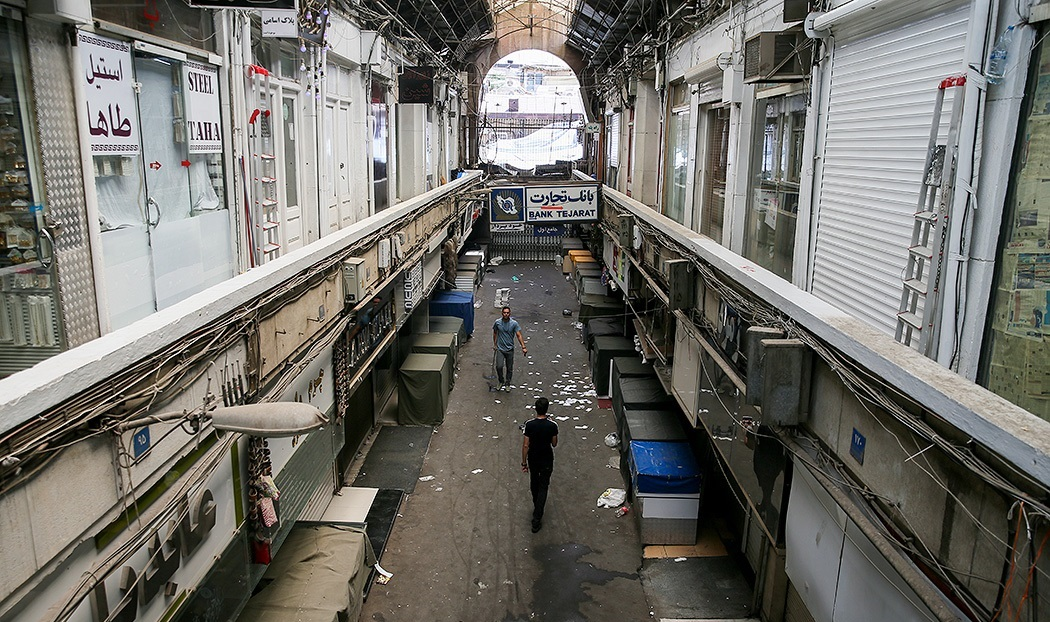
The bazaar during an economic protest strike in 2018

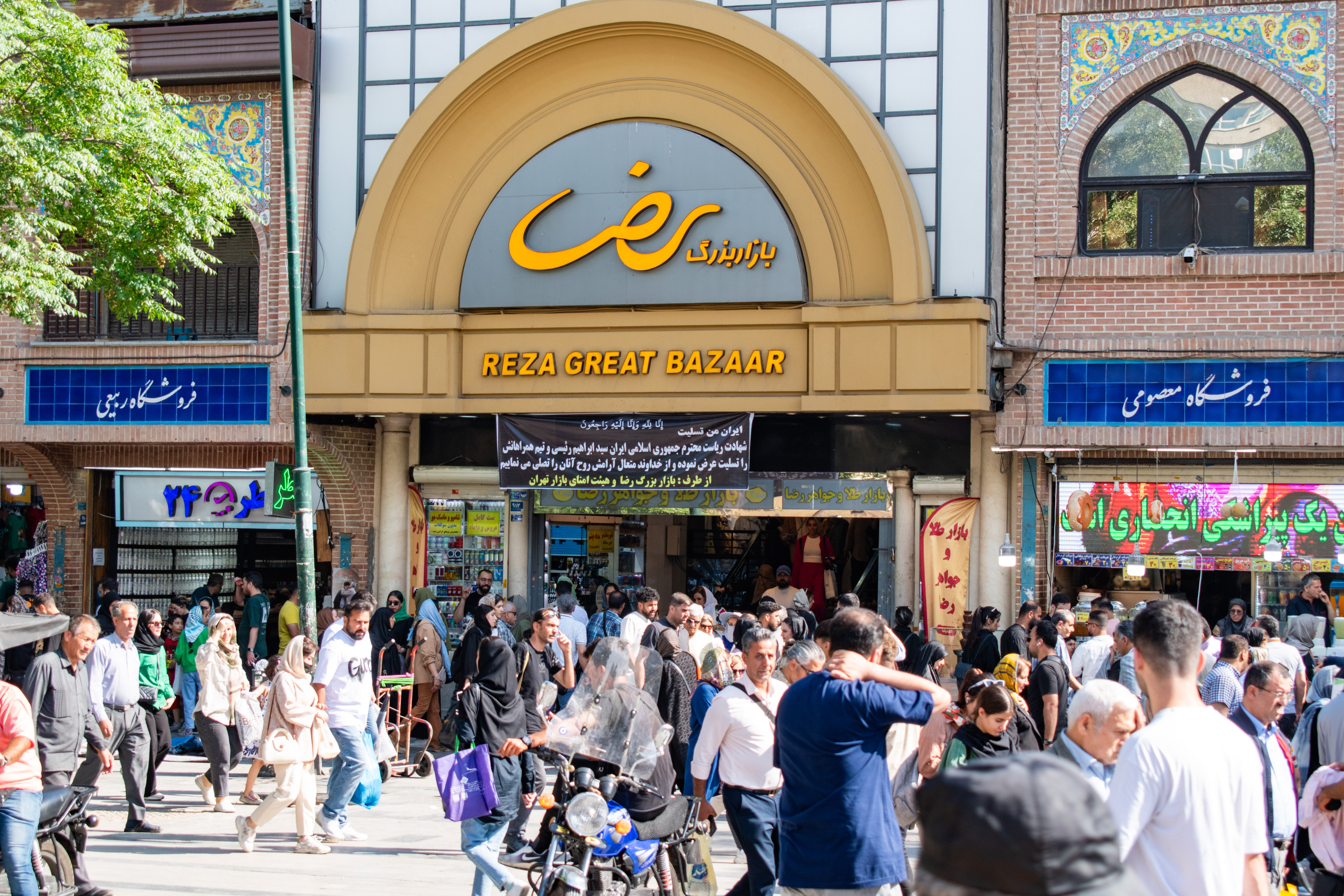
North entrance

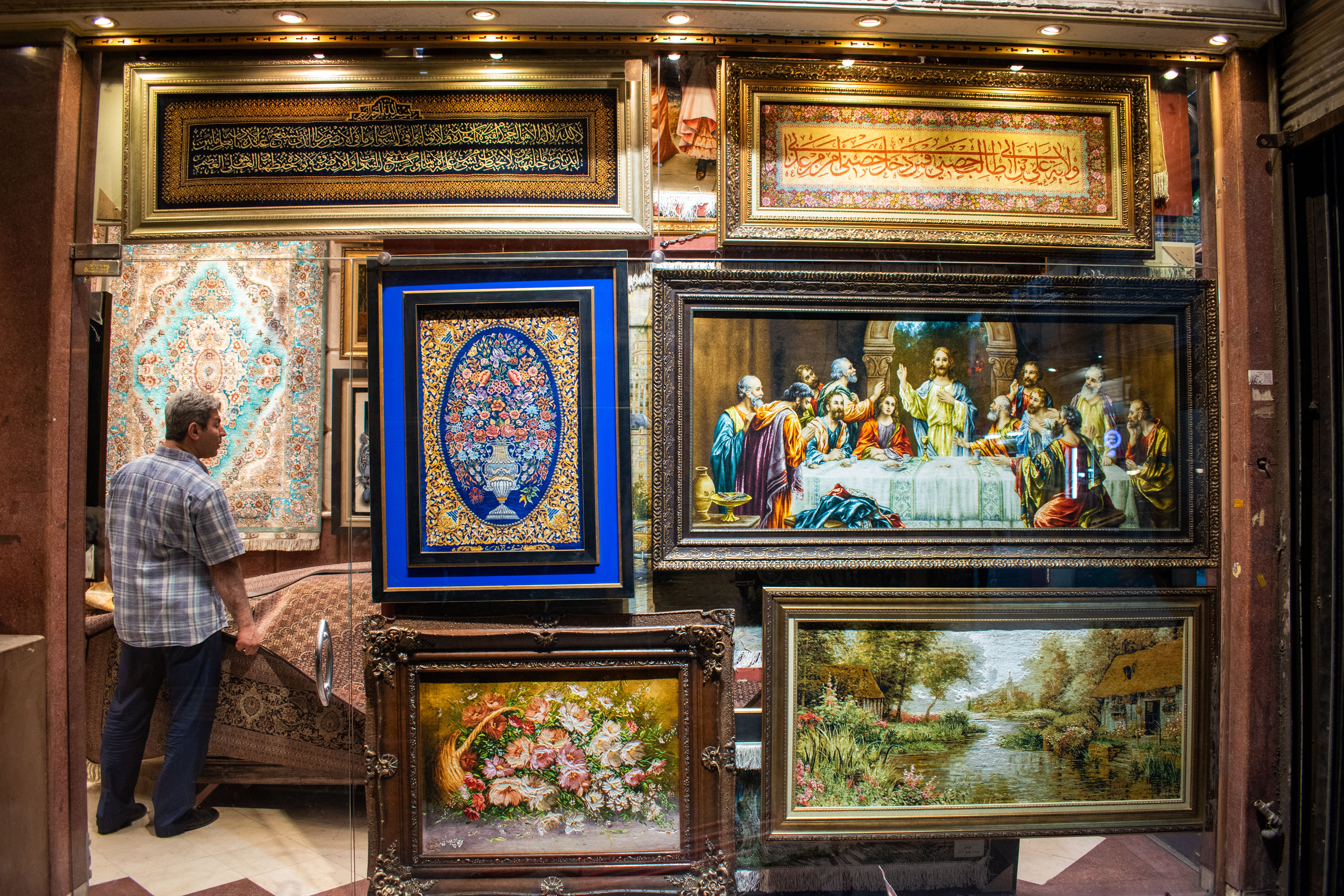
Tapestry shop inside the bazaar

== See also ==
- Economy of Iran
- Iranian architecture
