= Khayyam Street =

Street in Tehran, Iran

Coordinates: 35°39′45″N 51°24′53.4″E

Khayyam Street خیابان خیام
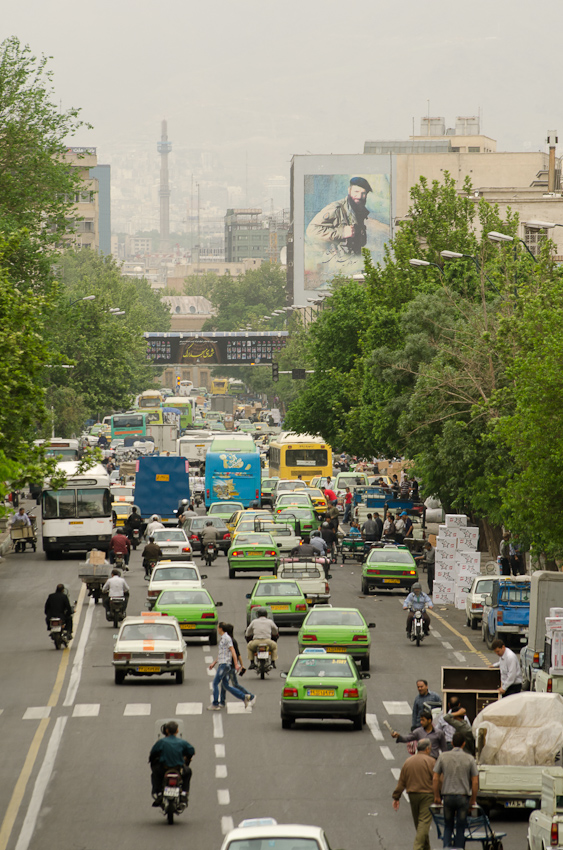
- Interactive map of Khayyam Street خیابان خیام
- Length: 3 km (1.9 mi)
- Location: Tehran
- From: Imam Khomeini Street
- To: Shush Street

Khayyam Street (Persian: خیابان خیام, romanized: Khiābān Khayyām) is a street located in District 12 of the city of Tehran, Iran. It was named in honour of the poet Omar Khayyam.

Khayyam Street intersects Imam Khomeini Street at its northern terminus and Shoosh Street at its southern terminus.

This street was called Jalil Abad Street during the Qajar Dynasty.

== See also ==
- Courthouse of Tehran
- Park-e Shahr
