= Tehran Metro Line 1 =

Metro line in Tehran, Iran

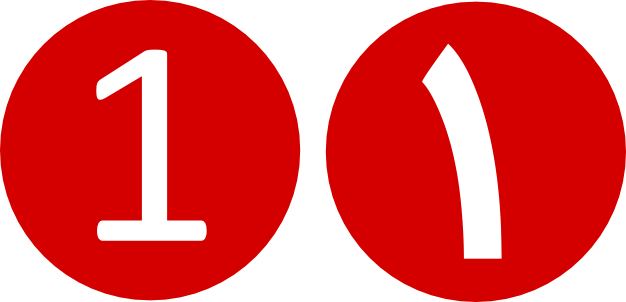

Overview
- Native name: خط ۱ مترو تهران
- Owner: Tehran Urban and Suburban Railways Organization (Metro)
- Locale: Tehran, Tehran Province
- Termini: Tajrish Station; Kahrizak Station, Parand
- Stations: 29+3 (Including IKIA branch)

Service
- Type: Rapid transit
- System: Tehran Metro
- Operator(s): Tehran Urban and Suburban Railways Organization (Metro)
- Depot: Tehran-South Depot

History
- Opened: 28 August 2001; 24 years ago
- Last extension: 2023

Technical
- Line length: 92 km (57 mi)
- Track gauge: 1,435 mm (4 ft 8 1/2 in)
- Electrification: Third rail
- Operating speed: 80 km/h (main line); 120 km/h (IKIA branch)

Tehran Metro Line 1, coloured red on system maps, runs north–south and is 92 kilometers (57 mi) of which 14.9 km (9.3 mi) is underground (from Tajrish station to Shush Station) and the rest at grade (at surface level). The number of stations along the main line is 29 of which 22 stations are underground and 7 above. The Airport branch has another three stations, all at grade. As of 2005, the line's total capacity is 650,000 passengers per day and trains make a scheduled stop of 20 seconds per station. The trains are made up of seven wagons, giving a nominal capacity of 1,300 seated and standing passengers. The maximum speed of the trains is 80 km/h (50 mph) per hour, in practice tempered to an average 45 km/h (28 mph) due to station stops, but 120 km/h (75 mph) on the Airport branch, so travel time for the 49 km (30 mi) from Shahed - Bagher Shahr Metro Station (short Shahed station) to Parand is just 34 minutes.

Line 1 runs mostly north–south, and from Shahed station has interchange platforms for its extension to Imam Khomeini International Airport completed in August 2017 and extended to Parand November 2023.

The first stage of the line was from Mirdamad station to Shahed station and opened in August 2001. A 4.1-kilometer (2.5 mi), three-station extension of the line from Mirdamad station to Qolhak opened on May 20, 2009; a 4-kilometer (2.5 mi), four-station second phase from Qolhak to Tajrish Square was completed in 2012. Construction was to be completed by March 2007 but faced major issues due to large boulders and rock bed in part of the tunnels as well as water ingress/drainage issues. It also faced major financing issues as the government refused to release funds earmarked for the project to the municipality.

== Route ==
The line starts at the northern terminus of Shari'ati Street, Tajrish neighbourhood and runs south along Shari'ati Street for about 5 km (3.1 mi). It runs briefly more westward along Mirdamad Boulevard. After passing through Mirdamad Station, it resumes its normal axis, reaching Beheshti Station where it intersects with Line 3. It mirrors the course of Dr. Mofatteh Street and after intersecting with Line 4 at Darvazeh Dowlat Station, on Sa'adi Street it rapidly intersects with Line 2 at Imam Khomeini Station at Toopkhaneh. It again shifts briefly southwest along Khayyam Street. Past Shush Station, the line surfaces and continues south, passing through Rey, and Behesht-e Zahra, Kahrizak, reaching Shahr-e Aftab Metro Station at Shahed station.

== Imam Khomeini Airport branch ==
Since April 2016 the 5 km (3.1 mi) branch from further platforms at Shahed - Bagher hahr Station to Shahr-e-Aftab Station opened, this new line was numbered 8 in the metro network. As line 8, it was extended by 26 km (16 mi) to Imam Khomeini Airport in August 2017. With the inauguration of the 19 km (12 mi) long phase 3, the extension to Parand in November 2023, this whole airport branch was renumbered to line 1 again.

== Stations ==
=== Saadi ===
Saadi ایستگاه مترو سعدی Istgah-e Metro-ye Sa'di
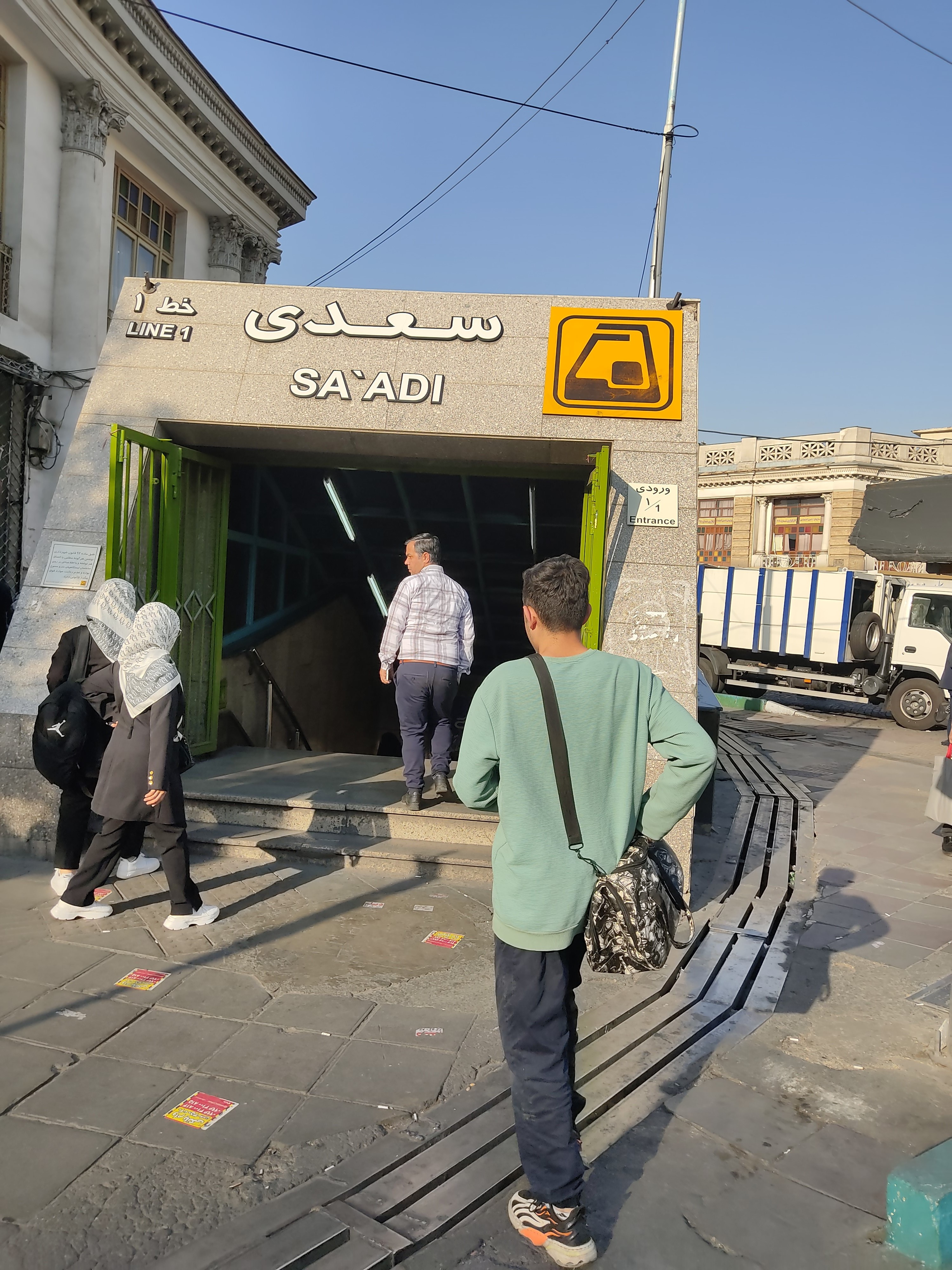

General information
- Location: Saadi Street- Jomhuri Street; District 12, Tehran, Tehran County; Tehran Province, Iran
- Coordinates: 35°41′35″N 51°25′29″E
- System: Tehran Metro Station
- Operator: Tehran Urban and Suburban Railways Organization (Metro)
- Platforms: Side platforms

Construction
- Structure type: Underground

History
- Opened: 1380 H-Kh (2001)

Services
Preceding station	Tehran Metro	Following station
Darvazeh Dowlat towards Tajrish	Line 1	Imam Khomeini towards Kahrizak
Location

Saadi Metro Station is a station on Tehran Metro Line 1. It is located in the junction of Saadi Street and Jomhuri-ye Eslami Street. It is between Imam Khomeini Metro Station and Darvaze Dolat Metro Station.
