= Kahrizak Metro Station =

Station of the Tehran Metro

Kahrizak Metro Station ایستگاه مترو کهریزک
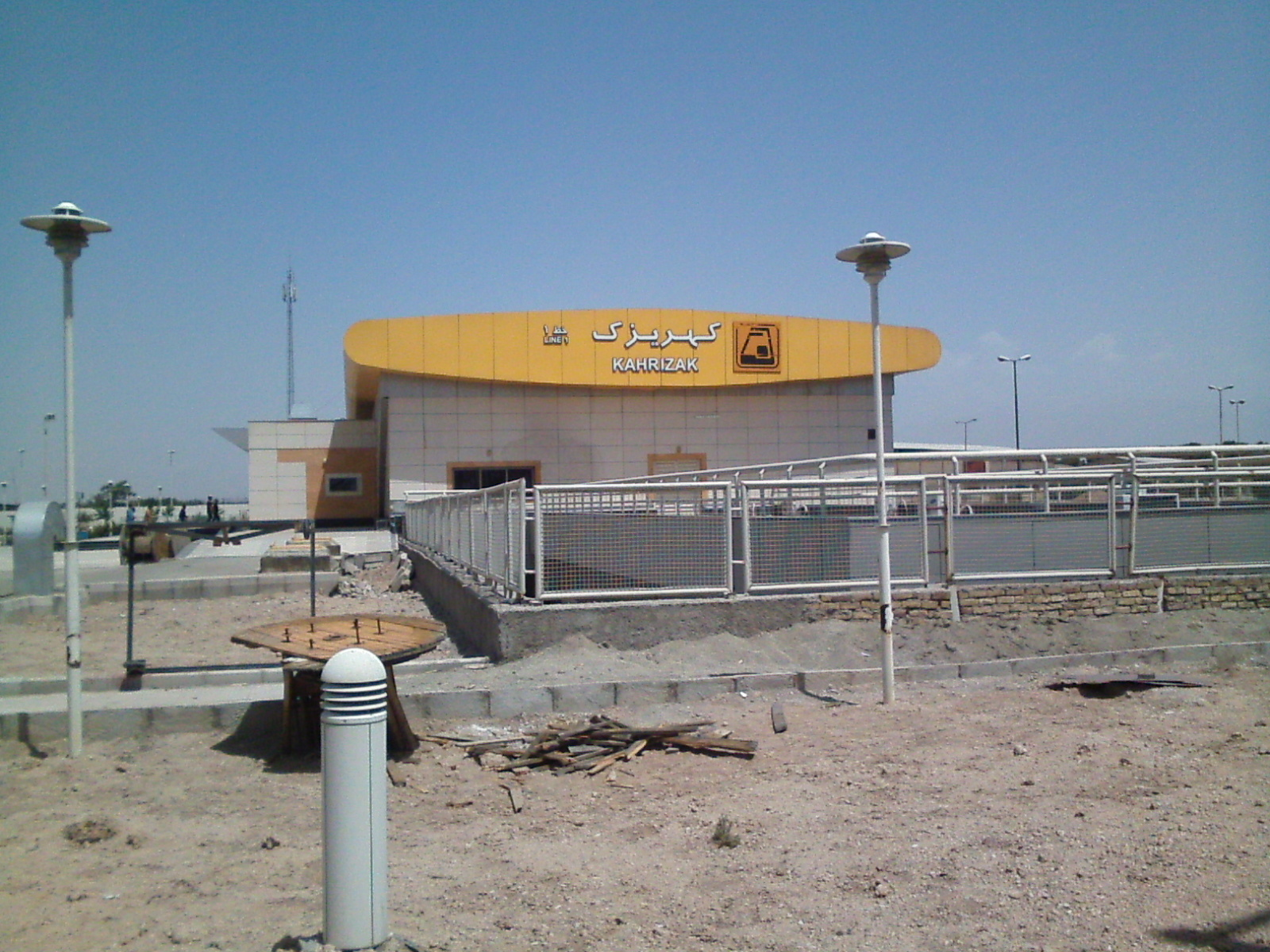

General information
- Location: Kahrizak, Ray County; Tehran Province, Iran
- System: Tehran Metro Station
- Operator: Tehran Urban and Suburban Railways Organization (Metro)
- Platforms: 2 Side Platforms

Construction
- Structure type: Surface
- Parking: Yes

History
- Opened: 1390 H-Kh (2011)

Services
Preceding station	Tehran Metro	Following station
Haram-e Motahhar-e Emam Khomeini towards Tajrish	Line 1	Terminus
Location

Kahrizak Metro Station is the final station of the Tehran Metro Line 1 and is located in Kahrizak, south of Behesht-e Zahra, Tehran, Iran. The next stop north is Haram-e Motahhar-e Emam Khomeini. The station was opened on July 21, 2011.
