= Tehrani =

Tehrani (Persian: تهرانی, meaning from Tehran, or related to Tehran) may refer to the following:

- Anything from Tehran
  - Tehrani accent, the most widely used accent of Persian language
- Tehrani, Fars, a village in Fars Province, Iran
- Tehrani (surname):
  - Ahmad Tehrani, 16th-century Iranian bureaucrat and poet
  - Aqa Bozorg Tehrani, a 20th-century Shia Muslim scholar
  - Hadyeh Tehrani, an Iranian actress
  - Hossein Tehrani, an Iranian musician
  - Mahmoud Mosharraf Azad Tehrani (M. Azad), a contemporary Iranian poet
