= Tehran water shortage =

Iranian environmental issue

Tehran, the capital of Iran, is experiencing a water shortage. Iran has faced a severe water scarcity crisis over recent decades, significantly affecting millions of people across the nation. This crisis is primarily due to a combination of environmental changes, poor resource management, and unsustainable agricultural practices, which have collectively caused a substantial decline in both surface and groundwater reserves. The excessive exploitation of water resources has further aggravated food insecurity and internal migration challenges. Inefficient agricultural techniques, along with the construction of dams, have disrupted natural water systems. Additionally, political factors - such as subsidies and corruption associated with the Islamic Revolutionary Guard Corps (IRGC) - have compounded the crisis.

== Details ==
The capital city of Tehran, accommodating approximately 18% of Iran's population, epitomizes the country's water-related challenges. Notably, the city experiences stark water supply inequalities: impoverished districts struggle with inadequate water provision and hazardous water quality, while affluent areas, housing many of the nation's economic elite—including high-ranking government and Islamic Revolutionary Guard Corps (IRGC) officials - are largely exempt from these hardships. These privileged neighborhoods maintain numerous private swimming pools and spacious green spaces.

Iran faces a severe water crisis due to a combination of climate change, population growth, and decades of poor management. The country over uses its water resources, exacerbating issues of food insecurity and migration. Inefficient agricultural practices and the construction of dams have harmed natural water flows. Political factors, including subsidies and corruption linked to the Islamic Revolutionary Guard Corps (IRGC), worsen the crisis. Growing public protests and international disputes over water resources underscore the urgency of a fundamental shift in water management and governance. Tehran is currently grappling with a severe water shortage driven by reduced rainfall, excessive groundwater extraction, and outdated infrastructure – a result of Iran's water management system being plagued by political favoritism, where the IRGC and other politically connected entities control water resources, prioritizing projects for political and economic gain rather than public need.

This crisis has resulted in significant reductions in water pressure and the depletion of reservoirs, particularly in the southern districts of the city. Presently, three of the five principal dams supplying Tehran are approaching critically low levels, prompting authorities to urge the public to intensify water conservation efforts. The long-term outlook remains bleak, exacerbated by persistent drought and the adverse impacts of climate change. Tehran's dam reserves have decreased in 2023 by 5% with total storage standing at merely 26% of capacity Additionally, the water quality in Tehran has deteriorated to hazardous levels, with nitrite concentrations surpassing safety standards, particularly in economically disadvantaged neighborhoods.

The water scarcity issue in Tehran is not uniformly experienced across the city; there are significant disparities between neighborhoods. Due to a combination of geographical, socio-economic, and infrastructural factors, the northern and southern areas of Tehran face different levels of water shortage challenges. The northern districts benefit from their proximity to mountain water sources, which grants them a strategic advantage in terms of water supply. This geographic closeness enables these areas to maintain more consistent water pressure and access to water of higher quality, in contrast to the southern districts, which are often disadvantaged in this regard

Wealthier northern districts of Tehran have significantly benefited from greater investments in water infrastructure, resulting in more advanced distribution systems and enhanced storage facilities. In contrast, the less affluent neighborhoods often depend on outdated or inadequate infrastructure, intensifying water supply challenges, particularly during periods of drought. This disparity in access to water highlights deeper socio-economic inequalities within the city. Residents in northern Tehran are more likely to experience uninterrupted water services, even during times of peak demand, whereas in southern districts, water rationing is more frequent. This inequality is widely perceived as indicative of preferential treatment toward wealthier areas. Historically, urban development policies have favored northern Tehran, contributing to an inequitable distribution of water resources.

== Calls for evacuation of Tehran ==
By early November 2025, the crisis had become so unprecedented that the Iranian president, Masoud Pezeshkian, reportedly said that if Tehran did not receive any rain by late November, water rationing would begin, and that if the situation continued to get worse, Tehran will have to be evacuated. These comments drew significant criticism within Iran, with former Tehran mayor Gholamhossein Karbaschi called the idea "a joke" and said that "evacuating Tehran makes no sense at all".

On 20 November 2025, President Masoud Pezeshkian said in a speech in Qazvin that if rainfall did not occur in Tehran by December, water rationing would be necessary, and that continued drought conditions could ultimately require the evacuation of the city. He said that there were parts of Tehran that were sinking up to 30 centimetres per year and that Tehran was facing a catastrophe. A potential site for relocation could be Makran, something that Iranian government had been considering since January 2025. Critics of the relocation say that the region around Makran is underdeveloped, exposed to security risks and far from ready to host a national capital, with some arguing that such a move would be impossible because of high inflation and the sanctions imposed on Iran.

== Water injustice ==
Water access in Tehran is marked by significant inequalities, disproportionately affecting low-income communities, informal settlements, and refugee populations. Many marginalized groups in the southern and peripheral areas of the city lack access to the official drinking water network, forcing them to rely on illegal connections or unsafe water sources which leads to health risks, social conflicts, and vulnerability. The unequal distribution of water infrastructure means that informal settlements – often unrecognized by municipal authorities - are frequently excluded from water supply priorities during shortages.

Environmental justice concerns in Tehran also stem from historical shifts in water governance. Historically, mahallas (neighborhood communities) played a key role in distributing water resources equitably through decentralized governance. These local institutions managed water-sharing arrangements, dispute resolution, and infrastructure maintenance, ensuring a participatory approach to water governance. However, the shift to a state-controlled system has weakened community involvement, leading to a lack of representation for vulnerable populations in water-related decision-making and exacerbating disparities in access and affordability.

Additionally, Iran's broader water policies contribute to systemic inequalities. Large-scale infrastructure projects, including inter-basin water transfers and excessive dam construction, prioritize industrial and urban development in wealthier central regions, often at the expense of rural and marginalized urban populations. This has led scholars to characterize Iran's water governance as an example of environmental racism, where ethnic minority communities such as Khuzestan Arabs, Mazandaran Gilaks, and Kurds face heightened water scarcity.

== See also ==
- Water scarcity in Iran
