= Tehran =

Capital and largest city of Iran

Tehran تهران
- Capital city
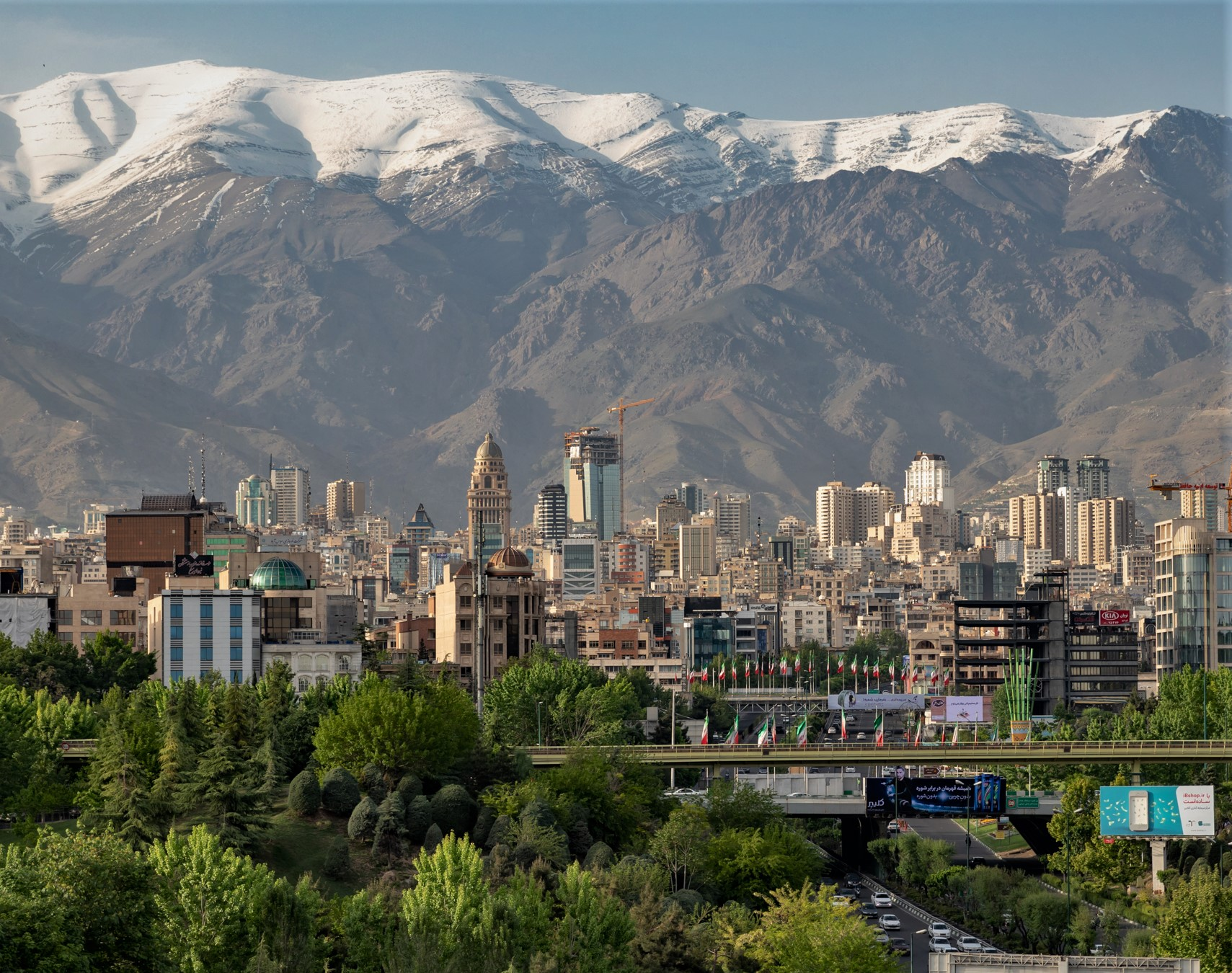
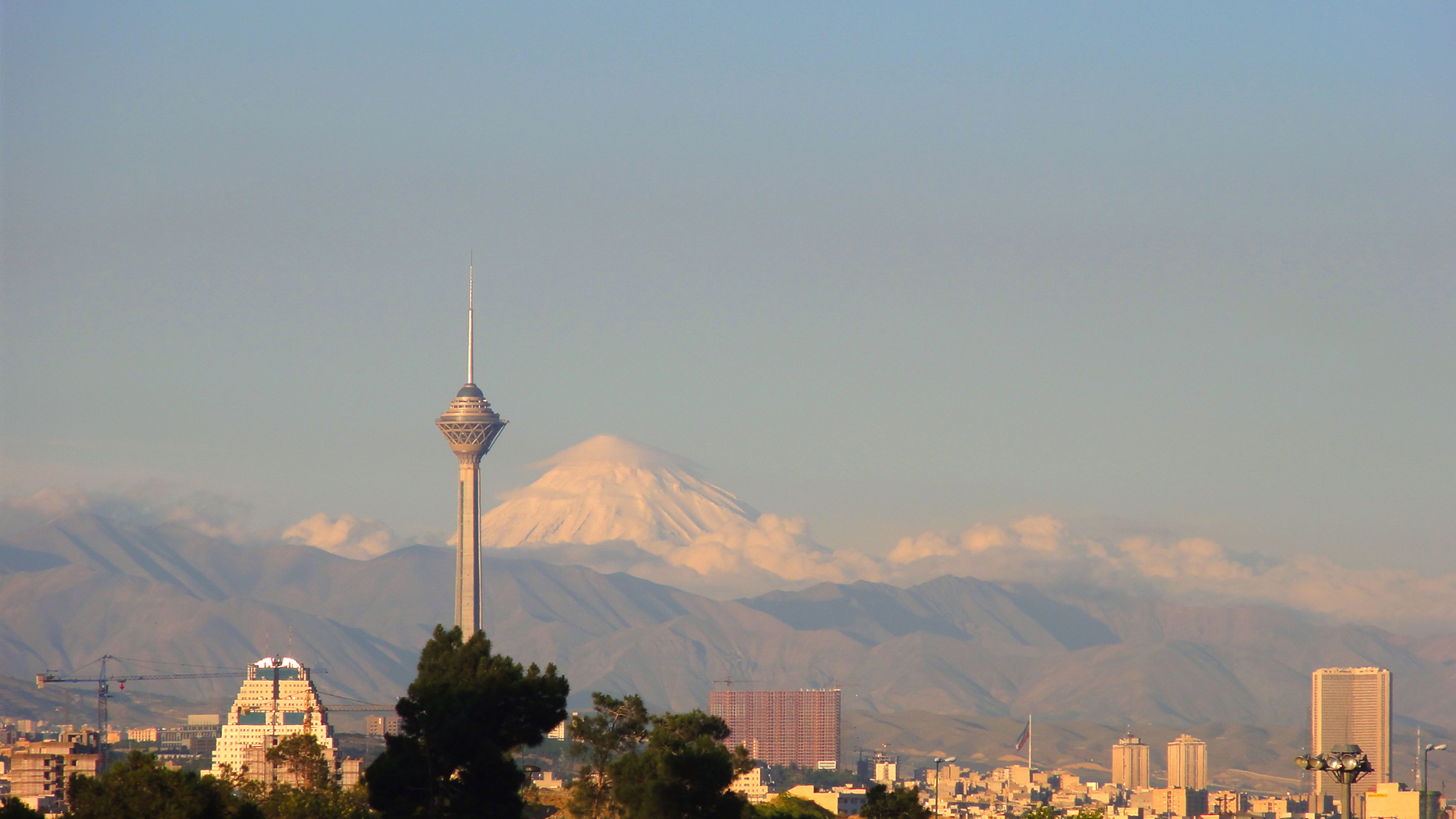
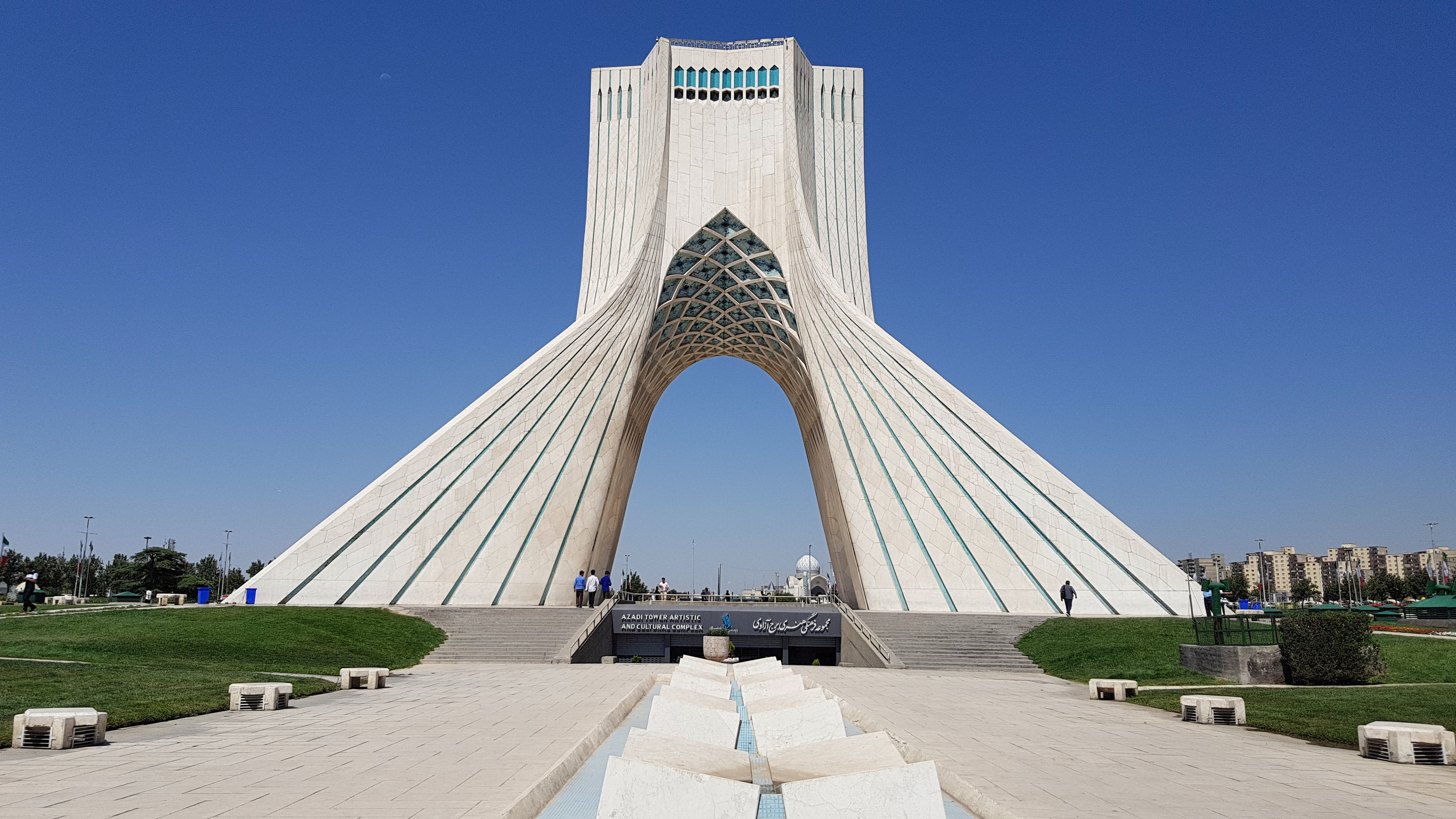
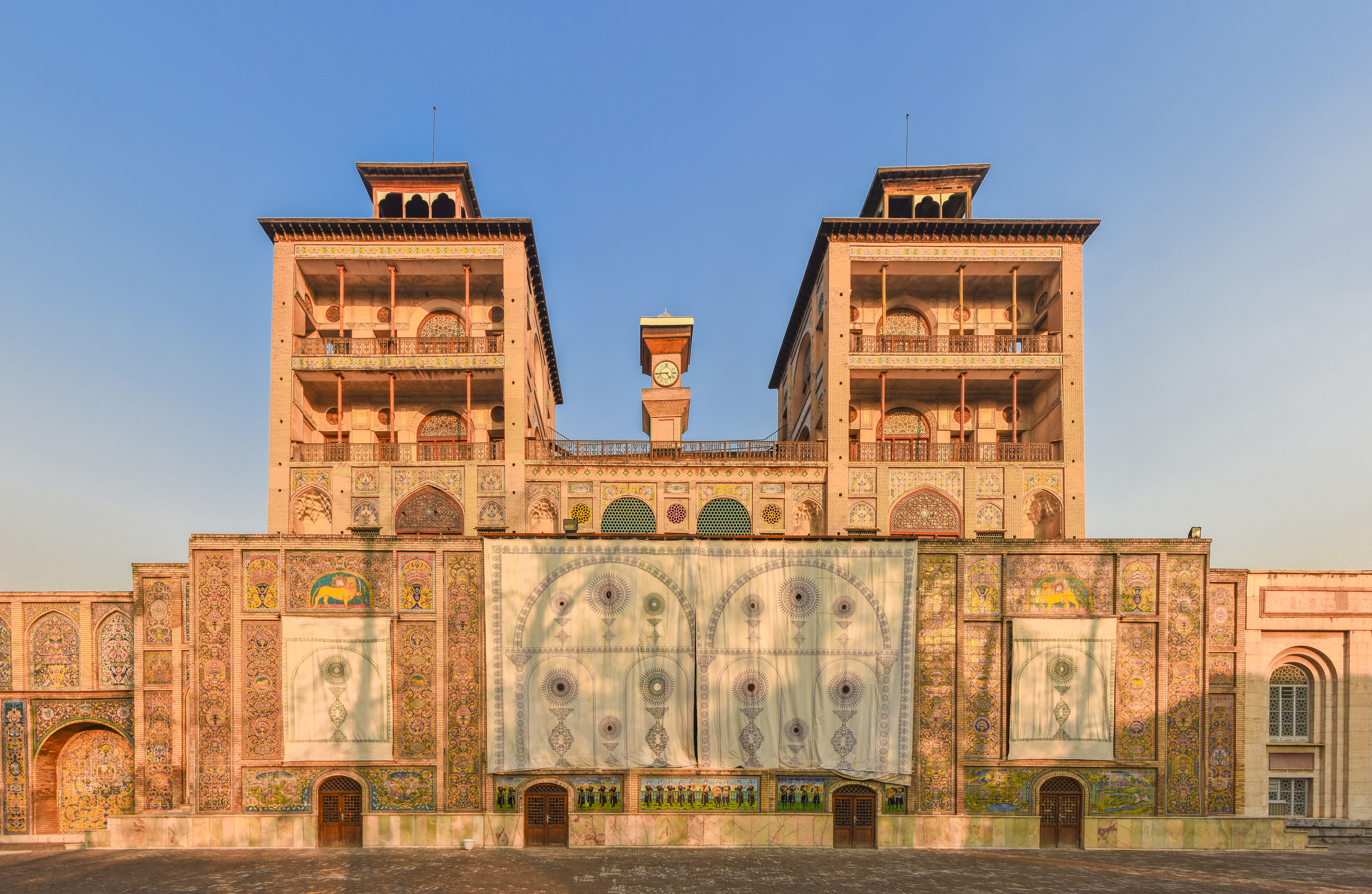
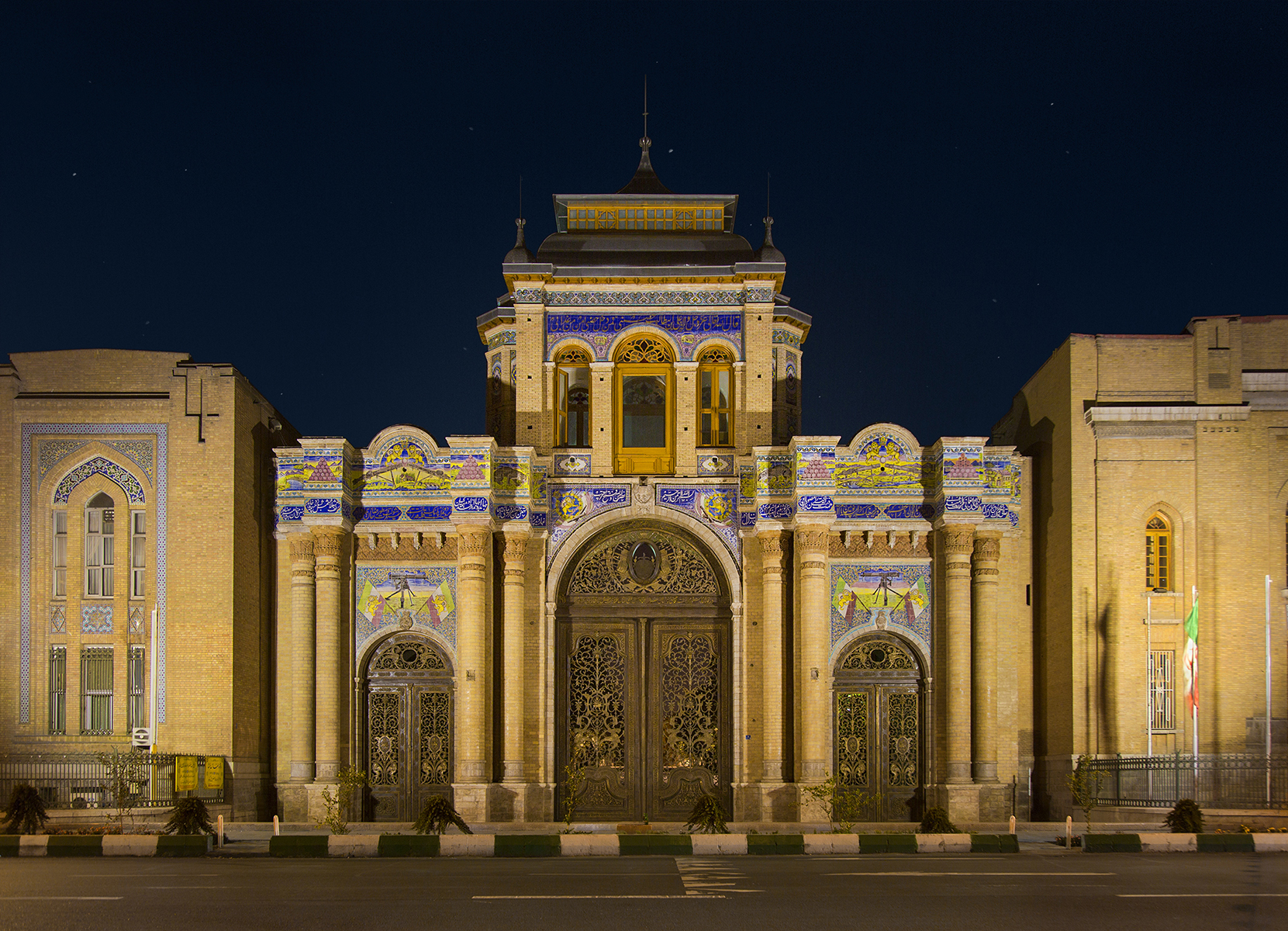
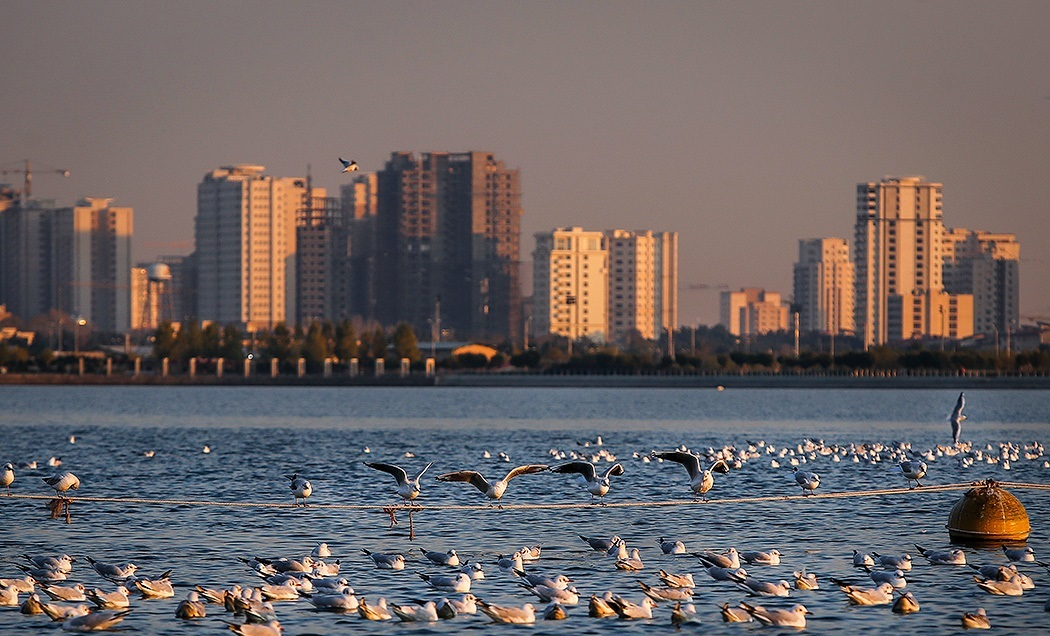
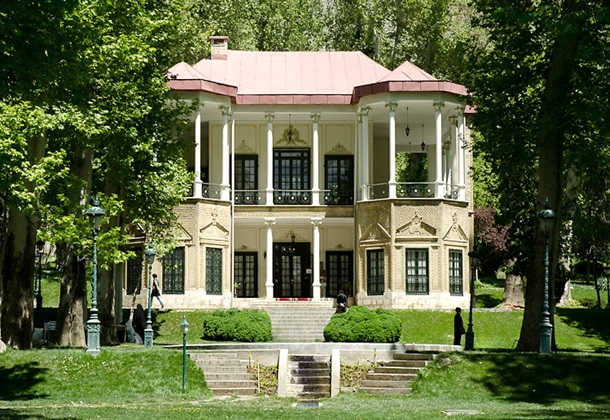
- Tehran skyline and the Alborz (Mount Tochal) Milad Tower and Mount Damavand Azadi Tower Golestan Palace National Garden Chitgar Lake Niavaran Complex

- Flag Seal
- Map of Tehran
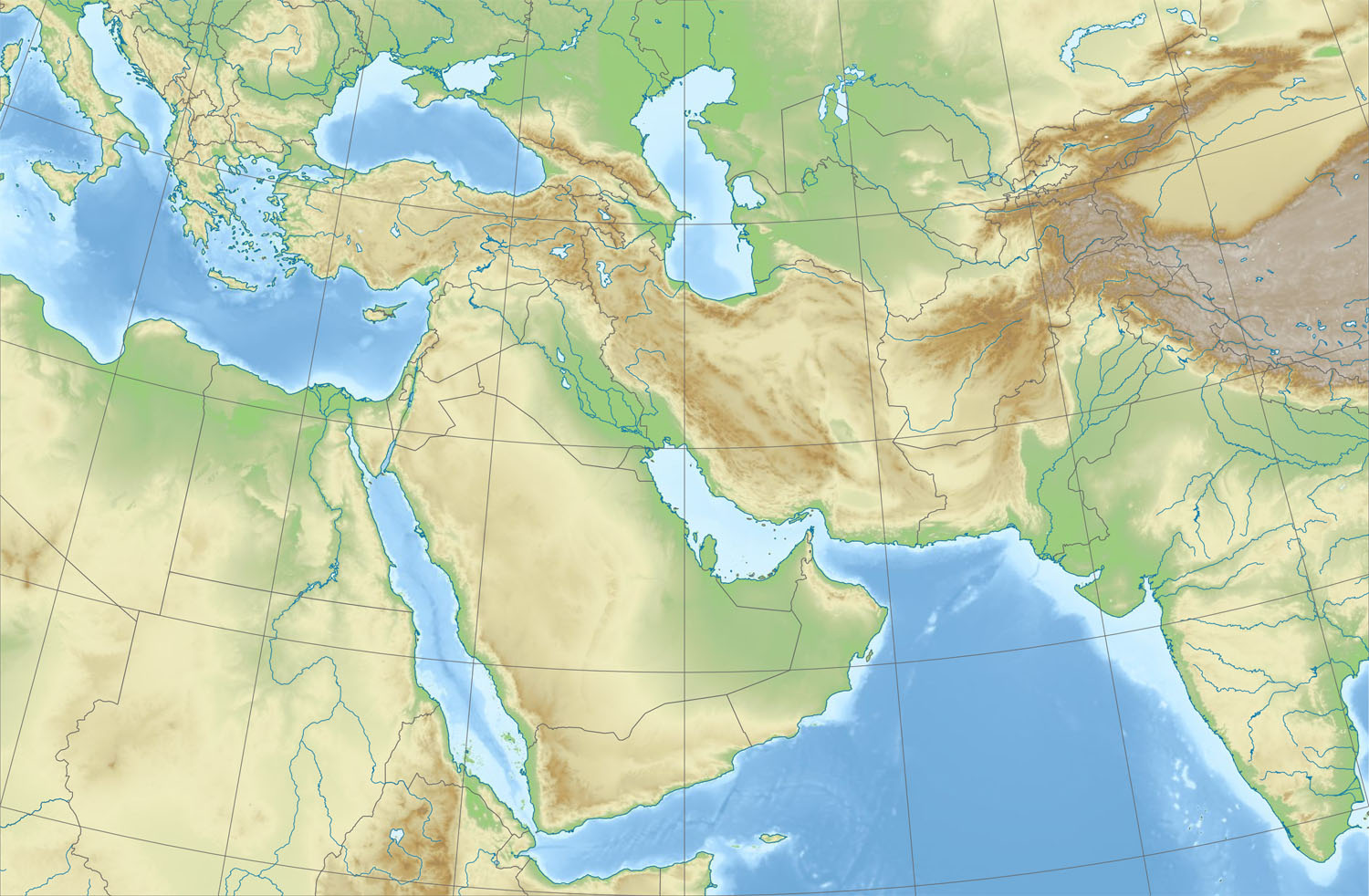
- Location within Iran Location within Middle East Location within Asia
- Coordinates: 35°41′20″N 51°23′23″E
- Country: Iran
- Province: Tehran
- County: Tehran; Rey; Shemiranat
- District: Central

Government
  - Mayor: Alireza Zakani
  - City Council Chairman: Mehdi Chamran
  - City Council: Islamic City Council of Tehran

Area
  - Urban: 750 km^{2} (290 sq mi)
  - Metro: 2,235 km^{2} (863 sq mi)
- Elevation: 1,040 to 2,040 m (3,410 to 6,690 ft)

Population (2016 census)
  - Capital city: 8,693,706
  - Estimate (2026): 9,840,100
  - Density: 12,052/km^{2} (31,210/sq mi)
  - Metro (2025): 14,557,000 (province)
  - Population rank in Iran: 1st
- Demonym: Tehrani

GDP (Nominal, 2024)
  - Capital city: US$67.6 billion
  - Per capita: US$7,000
- Time zone: UTC+03:30 (IRST)
- Area code: +98 21
- Climate: BSk
- Website: tehran.ir

Tehran (Note: /tɛˈræn, -ˈrɑːn, teɪˈ-/ terr-A(H)N, tay-RA(H)N; Persian: تهران, romanized: Tehrân, pronounced [tʰehˈɹɒːn, -ˈɾɒːn]) is the capital and largest city of Iran. It is also the capital of Tehran province and the administrative center for Tehran County and its Central District. With a population of around 9 million in the city, and 16.8 million in the metropolitan area, Tehran is the most populous city in Iran and West Asia, the largest metropolitan area in the Middle East and the 24th-most-populous metropolitan area in the world. Greater Tehran includes several municipalities, including Eslamshahr, Shahriar, Qods, Malard, Golestan, Varamin, Pakdasht, Qarchak, Nasimshahr, Parand, Pardis, Andisheh, Fardis, Tajrish, and Rey.

In classical antiquity, part of the territory of present-day Tehran was occupied by Rhages, a prominent Iranian city that was not destroyed in the medieval Arab and Mongol invasions. Rey is absorbed into the metropolitan area of Greater Tehran. Tehran was first chosen as the capital of Iran in 1786 by Agha Mohammad Khan of the Qajar dynasty, because of its proximity to Iran's territories in the Caucasus—which were contested in the Russo-Iranian Wars—and to avoid the vying factions of prior ruling Iranian dynasties; the capital of Iran had been moved several times throughout its long history, with Tehran becoming the 51st. Under Reza Shah, Tehran witnessed Iran's first institute of higher learning, bank, railway line, and museum. Large-scale construction works began in the 1920s, and Tehran became a destination for mass migrations from all over Iran, especially in the 20th century. Tehran was at the center of the Iranian Revolution, and experienced major bombing damage during the Iran–Iraq War, the Twelve-Day War, and the 2026 Iran war.

Tehran is home to many historical sites, including the World Heritage Site Golestan Palace of the Qajar dynasty and the Masoudieh, Sa'dabad, Niavaran and Marmar palace complexes of both the Qajar and Pahlavi dynasties. Landmarks include the Azadi Tower, a memorial built in 1971 to mark the 2,500th anniversary of the Persian Empire; the Milad Tower, the world's sixth-tallest self-supporting tower, completed in 2007; and the Tabiat Bridge, completed in 2014.

Tehran has been described as a cultural "melting pot", hosting more Azerbaijanis than any other city in the world. Tehran is served by Imam Khomeini International Airport, alongside the domestic Mehrabad Airport, a central railway station, Tehran Metro, the Tehran Bus Rapid Transit system, trolleybuses, and a large network of highways.

Because of air pollution, earthquakes and water scarcity, there have been plans to relocate the capital to another area, although none have been approved. A 2016 survey of 230 cities across the globe by Mercer ranked Tehran 203rd for quality of life. According to the Global Destinations Cities Index in 2016, Tehran was among the top ten fastest growing tourism destinations. In 2016, the Tehran City Council declared 6 October "Tehran Day", celebrating the date in 1907 when the city officially became the capital of Iran.

== Etymology ==
Various theories on the origin of the name Tehran have been put forward. Iranian linguist Zana Kamrani, in an article "Shemiran-Tehran", suggests that Tehran, and Kehran mean "the warm place", and "Shemiran" means "the cool place". He lists cities with the same base and suffix and studied the components of the word in ancient Iranian languages, and came to the conclusion that Tehran and Kehran meant the same thing in different Iranian language families, as the constant "t" and "k" are close to each other in such languages. He also provided evidence that cities named "Shemiran" were colder than those named "Tehran" or "Kehran". He considered other theories not consider the ancient history of Iranian languages, such as "Tirgan" theory and "Tahran" theory folk etymology.

The official City of Tehran website says that "Tehran" comes from the Persian words "Tah" meaning "end", or "bottom", and "Ran" meaning "[mountain] slope"; the bottom of the mountain (ته کوه), referring to Tehran's position at the foot of the Alborz mountains.

In English, it is also spelt "Teheran", with both variants being used in books since at least 1800, and "Teheran" being the dominant form from after WWII until shortly before the Islamic Revolution.

== History ==
Archaeological remains from the ancient city of Ray suggest that settlement in Tehran dates back over 6,000 years.

=== Classical era ===
Tehran is in the historical Media region (Old Persian: 𐎶𐎠𐎭 Māda) in northwestern Iran. By the time of the Median Empire, part of present-day Tehran was a suburb of the prominent Median city of Rhages (Old Persian: 𐎼𐎥𐎠 Ragā). In the Avesta's Videvdat (i, 15), Rhages is mentioned as the 12th sacred place created by Ohrmazd. In Old Persian inscriptions, Rhages appears as a province (Bistun 2, 10–18). From Rhages, Darius I sent reinforcements to his father Hystaspes, who was putting down a rebellion in Parthia (Bistun 3, 1–10). Some Middle Persian texts give Rhages as the birthplace of Zoroaster, although modern historians generally place the birth of Zoroaster in Khorasan province.

Mount Damavand, the highest peak of Iran, which is located near Tehran, is an important location in Ferdowsi's Šāhnāme, an Iranian epic poem based on the ancient legends of Iran. It appears in the epics as the homeland of the protoplast Keyumars, the birthplace of King Manuchehr, the place where King Fereydun bound the dragon fiend Zahhak (Bivarasp), and the place where Arash shot his arrow.

=== Medieval period ===
In 641, during the reign of the Sasanian Empire, Yazdgerd III issued his last appeal to the nation from Rhages, before fleeing to Khorasan. Rhages was dominated by the Parthian House of Mihran, and Siyavakhsh—the son of Mehran, the son of Bahram Chobin—who resisted the seventh-century Muslim invasion of Iran. Because of this resistance, when the Arabs captured Rhages, they ordered the town destroyed and rebuilt anew by the aristocrat Farrukhzad.

In the ninth century, Tehran was a well-known village, but less so than Rhages, flourishing nearby. Rhages was described in detail by tenth-century Muslim geographers. Despite the interest that Arabian Baghdad displayed in Rhages, the number of Arabs in the city remained insignificant and the population mainly consisted of Iranians of all classes.

The Oghuz Turks invaded Rhages in 1035 and again in 1042, but the city was recovered under the Seljuks and the Khwarezmians. Medieval writer Najm od Din Razi declared the population of Rhages about 500,000 before the Mongol invasion. In the 13th century, the Mongols invaded Rhages, laid the city to ruins, and massacred many of its inhabitants. Others escaped to Tehran. In July 1404, Castilian ambassador Ruy González de Clavijo visited Tehran on a journey to Samarkand, the capital of Turco-Mongol conqueror Timur, the ruler of Iran at the time. He described it in his diary as an unwalled region.

=== Early modern era ===
Italian traveler Pietro della Valle passed through Tehran overnight in 1618, and in his memoirs called the city Taheran. English traveler Thomas Herbert entered Tehran in 1627, and mentioned it as Tyroan. Herbert states that the city had about 3,000 houses.

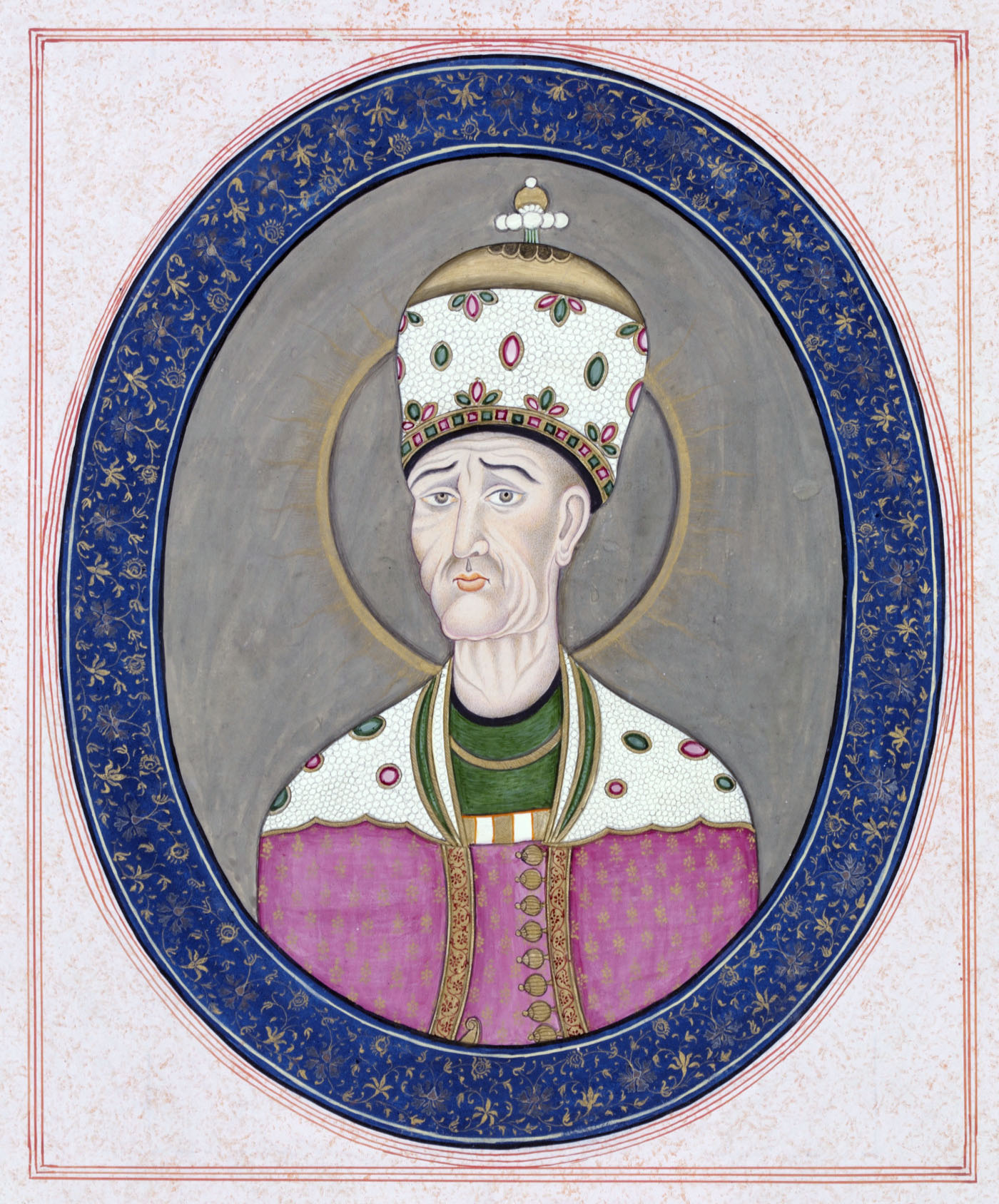
A portrait of the Shah of Iran Agha Mohammad Khan, at London's V&A Museum

In the early 18th century, Karim Khan of the Zand dynasty ordered a palace and a government office built in Tehran, possibly to declare the city his capital; but he later moved his government to Shiraz. Eventually, Qajar king Agha Mohammad Khan chose Tehran as the capital of Iran in 1786. Khan's choice of his capital was based on a similar concern for the control of both northern and southern Iran. He was aware of the loyalties of the inhabitants of former capitals Isfahan and Shiraz to the Safavid and Zand dynasties respectively, and was wary of the power of the local notables in these cities. Thus, he probably viewed Tehran's lack of a substantial urban structure as a blessing, because it minimized the chances of resistance to his rule by the notables and by the general public. He had to remain within close reach of Azerbaijan and Iran's integral northern and southern Caucasian territories—at that time not yet irrevocably lost per the treaties of Golestan and Turkmenchay to the neighboring Russian Empire—which would follow in the course of the 19th century.

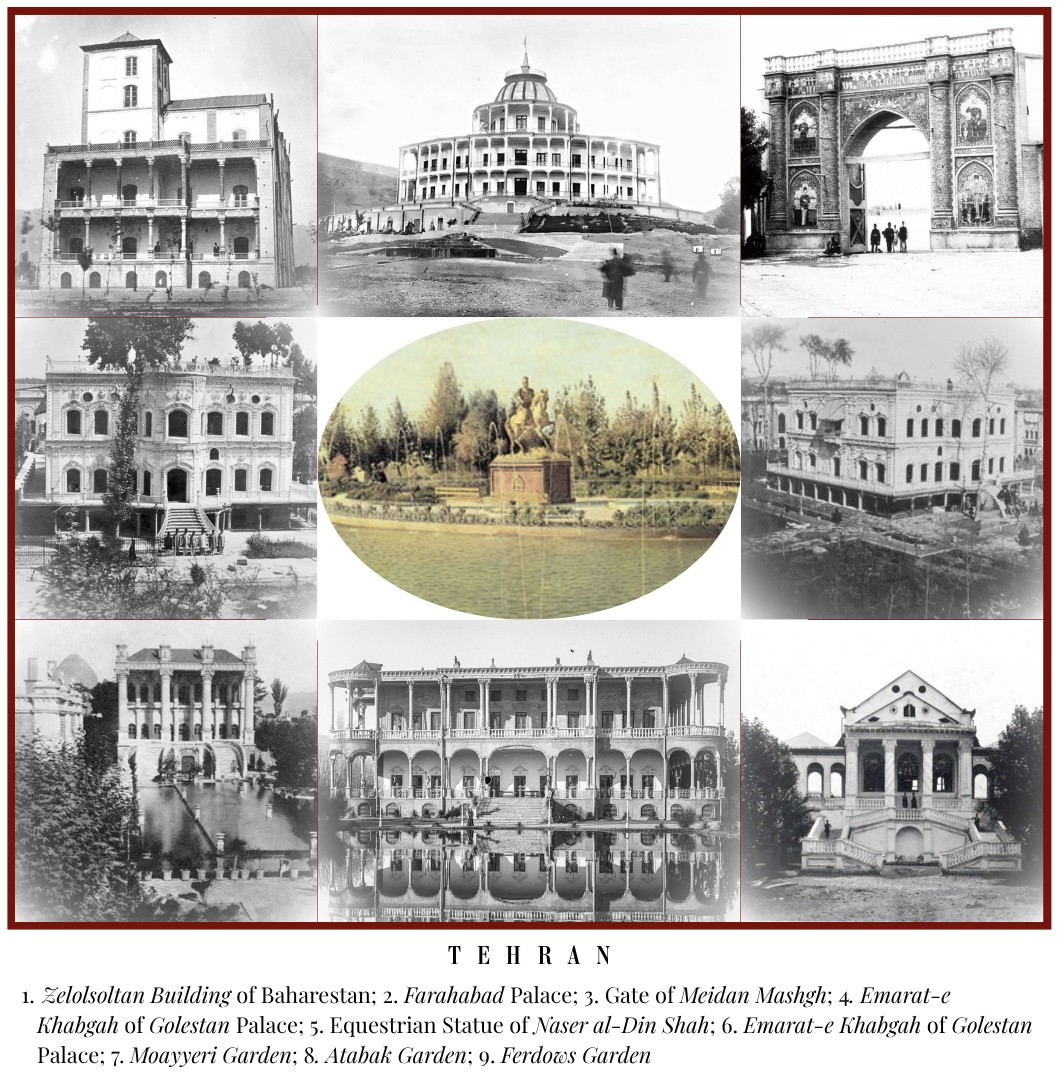
Architectural landmarks of 19th-century Tehran

After 50 years of Qajar rule, the city still barely had more than 80,000 inhabitants. Up until the 1870s, Tehran consisted of a walled citadel, a roofed bazaar, and the three main neighborhoods of Udlajan, Chale-Meydan, and Sangelaj, where the majority resided.

During the long reign of Naser al-Din Shah (1848-1896), Tehran witnessed Iran's first institute of higher learning, bank, railway line and museum. The Golestan Palace was significantly rebuilt and expanded in 1865 by Haji Ab ol Hasan Mimar Navai, including the Brilliant Hall, the Mirror Hall and the Edifice of the Sun. The city expanded rapidly through multiple development plans. The first development plan in 1855 emphasized traditional spatial structure. The second, under the supervision of Dar al-Fonun in 1878, included new city walls, in the form of a perfect octagon with an area of 19 square kilometers, mimicking the Renaissance cities of Europe. Tehran was 19.79 square kilometers and had expanded more than fourfold.

=== Late modern era ===
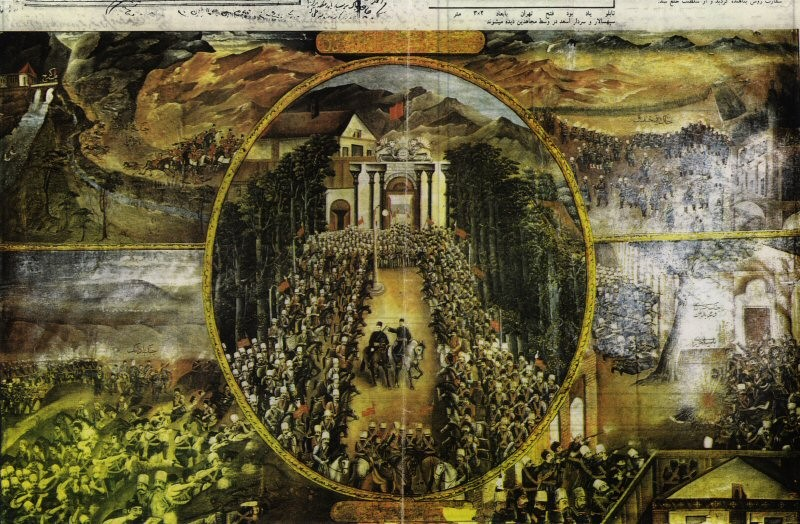
The Triumph of Tehran: Sardar Asad II and Sepahsalar e Tonekaboni conquering Tehran in July 1909

Growing awareness of civil rights resulted in the Constitutional Revolution and the first constitution of Iran in 1906. On 2 June 1907, the parliament passed a law on local governance known as the Baladie (municipal law), providing a detailed outline of issues such as the role of councils within the city, the members' qualifications, the election process, and the requirements to be entitled to vote.

Mohammad Ali Shah abolished the constitution and bombarded the parliament with the help of the Russian-controlled Cossack Brigade on 23 June 1908. That was followed by the capture of the city by the revolutionary forces of Ali-Qoli Khan (Sardar Asad II) and Mohammad Vali Khan (Sepahsalar e Tonekaboni) on 13 July 1909. As a result, the monarch was exiled and replaced by his son Ahmad, and the parliament was re-established.

During the Persian campaign of World War I, Russian forces that were occupying the northwest of Iran marched around Qazvin and approached Tehran, causing a crisis and the dissolution of parliament. Ahmad Shah Qajar and his entourage decided to leave Tehran and move the capital to another place, sparking fears of rebellion in other cities. During the Battle of Robat Karim, Iranian forces led by Heydar Latifiyan prevented the Russians from taking Tehran, despite the latter winning the battle. This also allowed government functions to be moved to Qom and then to Isfahan, while the monarchy remained in Tehran.

==== Pahlavi era ====
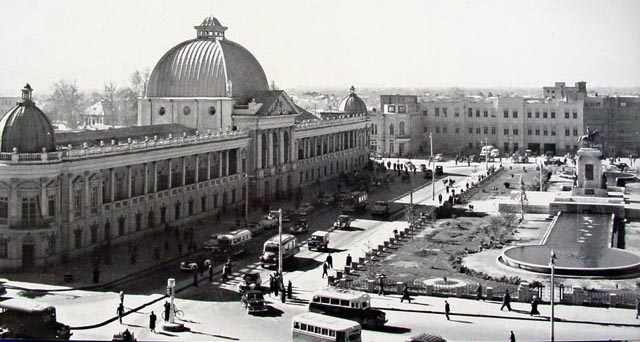
Under Reza Shah's reign, Tehran underwent a transformative modernization, with the establishment of urban infrastructure, modern streets, educational institutions, and public amenities, marking a pivotal step toward a structured, contemporary capital.

After World War I, the constituent assembly elected Reza Shah of the Pahlavi dynasty as the new monarch, who immediately suspended the Baladie law of 1907, replacing the decentralized and autonomous city councils with centralist approaches to governance and planning. From the 1920s to the 1930s, under the rule of Reza Shah, the city was rebuilt. Several old buildings, including parts of the Golestan Palace, Takyeh Dowlat, and Toopkhaneh Square, were replaced with modern buildings influenced by classical Iranian architecture, particularly the buildings of the National Bank, the police headquarters, the telegraph office, and the military academy.

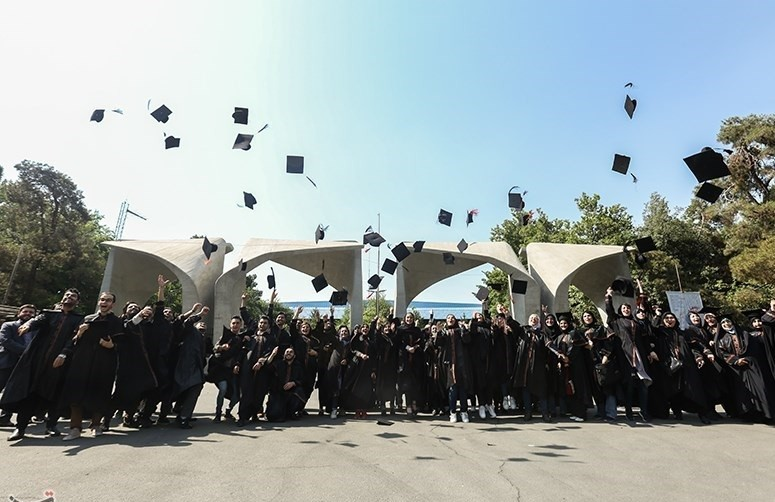
The University of Tehran was founded in 1934, a landmark in Iran's modernization. Its establishment introduced advanced education, modern infrastructure, and public amenities, transforming Tehran into a vibrant, contemporary capital.

Changes to the urban fabric began with the street-widening act of 1933, which served as a framework for changes in all other cities. The Grand Bazaar was divided in half and many historic buildings were demolished and replaced by wide straight avenues, and the traditional texture of the city was replaced with intersecting cruciform streets that created large roundabouts in major public spaces such as the bazaar. As an attempt to create a network for easy transportation within the city, the old citadel and city walls were demolished in 1937, replaced by wide streets cutting through the urban fabric. By 1937, the city was heavily influenced by modernist planning patterns of zoning and gridiron networks.

During World War II, Tehran was occupied as a result of the Anglo-Soviet invasion of Iran. In 1943, Tehran was the site of the Tehran Conference, attended by U.S. President Franklin D. Roosevelt, Soviet premier Joseph Stalin, and British Prime Minister Winston Churchill.

The establishment of the planning organization of Iran in 1948 resulted in the first socioeconomic development plan covering the period from 1949 to 1955. These plans not only failed to slow the unbalanced growth of Tehran but, with the 1962 land reforms that Reza Shah's son and successor, Mohammad Reza Shah named the White Revolution, Tehran's chaotic growth was further accentuated.

In the 1960s and 1970s, Tehran developed rapidly under Mohammad Reza Shah. Modern buildings altered the face of Tehran, and ambitious projects were planned for the following decades. To resolve the problem of social exclusion, the first comprehensive plan was approved in 1968. The consortium of Iranian architect Abd-ol-Aziz Farmanfarmaian and the American firm of Victor Gruen Associates identified the main problems blighting the city as high-density suburbs, air and water pollution, inefficient infrastructure, unemployment, and rural-urban migration. Eventually, the whole plan was marginalized by the 1979 Revolution and the subsequent Iran–Iraq War.

Tehran's most famous landmark, the Azadi Tower, was built by the order of the Shah in 1971. It was designed by Hossein Amanat, an architect whose design won a competition, combining elements of classical Sasanian architecture with post-classical Iranian architecture. Formerly known as the Shahyad Tower, it was built to commemorate the 2,500th anniversary of the Imperial State of Iran.

=== Islamic Republic ===
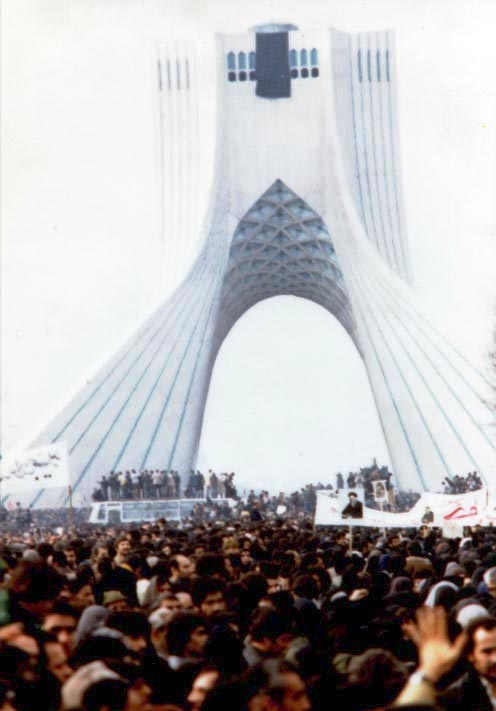
Azadi Tower during the 1979 Iranian Revolution

Following the 1979 Iranian Revolution, Tehran underwent profound transformations in its urban landscape, political structure, and social dynamics. The revolution led to the establishment of the Islamic Republic of Iran, which brought about a shift from a pro-Western monarchy to a theocratic system based on Islamic principles. This change was reflected in various aspects of Tehran's development. Politically, the revolution resulted in the consolidation of power by forces loyal to Ayatollah Ruhollah Khomeini, the leader of the revolution. Several million Tehranis greeted Khomeini's return to Iran. This period saw the establishment of new governance structures aligned with Islamic ideologies.

During the Iran–Iraq War from 1980 to 1988 and as a part of the War of the cities, Tehran was repeatedly targeted by airstrikes and Scud missile attacks leading to substantial infrastructural damage.

==== 21st century ====
The 435-meter-high Milad Tower, one of the proposed development projects of pre-revolutionary Iran, was completed in 2007 and has become a famous landmark of Tehran. Tabiat Bridge, a 270-meter pedestrian overpass that was designed by award-winning architect Leila Araghian, was completed in 2014. The city municipality started planting a large number of imported palm trees, replacing endemic plane trees. In the Twelve-Day War of June 2025, Tehran was attacked by Israeli airstrikes and, in an unprecedented move, the people of Tehran committed mass evacuations. The city has been under attack in the ongoing 2026 Iran war. On 8 March 2026, Israeli strikes on oil depots near Tehran caused the city to be engulfed in a cloud of thick black smoke, causing a dangerous black acid rainfall. Residents were advised by Iranian authorities to stay indoors, wear masks when outside, and conserve food and fuel.

After the ceasefire, Bloomberg reports that Tehran has suffered extensive destruction: buildings torn open, piles of rubble, and neighborhoods partially devastated. An analysis by the American agency of the Iranian capital estimates that 2,816 buildings were destroyed there: about 32% were linked to military activities, 25% to industry, 21% to civilian uses, while 19% belonged to the commercial sector and 2% to government infrastructure. The municipality of Tehran also states that more than 39,000 residential units were severely damaged by the bombings.

== Demographics ==
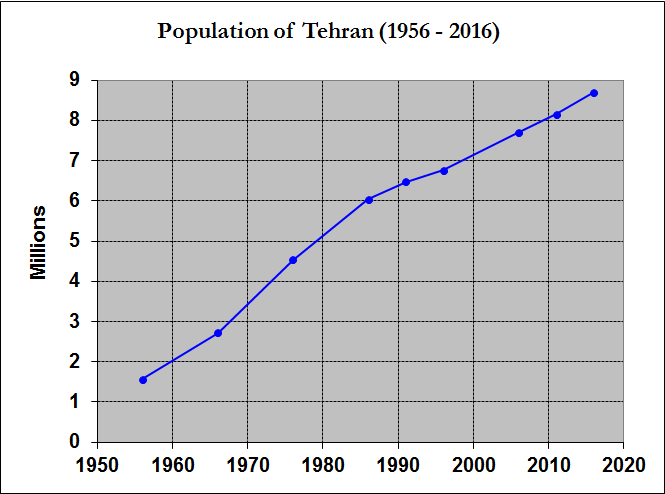
The population of Tehran

Tehran province's population pyramid in 2016

=== Population ===
Tehran's Population History

Year	Pop.	±% p.a.
1797	15,000	—
1807	50,000	+12.79%
1812	60,000	+3.71%
1834	80,000	+1.32%
1867	147,256	+1.87%
1930	250,000	+0.84%
1940	540,087	+8.01%
1956	1,560,934	+6.86%

Year	Pop.	±% p.a.
1966	2,719,730	+5.71%
1976	4,530,223	+5.23%
1986	6,058,207	+2.95%
1991	6,497,238	+1.41%
1996	6,758,845	+0.79%
2006	7,711,230	+1.33%
2011	8,244,759	+1.35%
2016	8,737,510	+1.17%

Tehran had a population of 7,711,230 people, in 2,286,787 households at the time of the 2006 National Census. The 2011 census counted 8,154,051 people, in 2,624,511 households. The 2016 census recorded 8,693,706 people, in 2,911,065 households.

=== Language and ethnicity ===
With its cosmopolitan atmosphere, Tehran is home to diverse ethnic and linguistic groups from all over the country. The present-day dominant language is the Tehrani variety of the Persian language, and the majority of people identify themselves as Persians. Historically the native language of the Tehran–Ray region was not Persian, which is linguistically Southwest Iranian and originates in Fars, but an extinct Persian dialect and Northwestern Iranian language.

Iranian Azeris are the second-largest ethnic group, comprising about 10–15% of the population. Ethnic Mazanderanis are the third-largest, comprising about 5% of the population. Tehran's other ethnic communities include Kurds, Armenians, Georgians, Bakhtyaris, Talysh, Baloch, Assyrians, Arabs, Jews, and Circassians. In the 2010 census by the Sociology Department of the University of Tehran, in many districts of Tehran across various socio-economic classes in proportion to population sizes of each district and socio-economic class, 63% of the people were born in Tehran, 98% knew Persian, 75% identified themselves as ethnic Persian, and 13% had some degree of proficiency in a European language.

There was a drastic change in ethnic-social composition in the early 1980s. After the political, social, and economic consequences of the 1979 Revolution and the years that followed, many Iranian citizens, mostly Tehranis, left Iran. The majority of Iranian emigrations have left for the United States, Germany, Sweden, and Canada. With the start of the Iran–Iraq War, a second wave of inhabitants fled the city, especially during the Iraqi air offensives on Tehran. With most major powers backing Iraq at the time, economic isolation gave yet more reason for many inhabitants to leave Tehran and the country. Having left all they had and having struggled to adapt to a new country and build a life, most of them never came back when the war was over. During the war, Tehran received a great number of migrants from the west and the southwest of Iran bordering Iraq.

=== Religion ===
The majority of religious Tehrani are officially Twelver Shia Muslims, which has been the main religion since the 16th-century Safavid conversion. Other religious communities include followers of the Sunni and Mystic branches of Islam, Christian denominations, Judaism, Zoroastrianism, and the Baháʼí Faith.

In the 2016 "Tehran Survey", when residents of Tehran were asked about the importance of religion in their life, 53.5% considered it to be "very important / important", 31.1% to be "rather important", 10.5% to be "not very important" and 4.8% to be "not at all important."

There are many religious centres scattered around Tehran, from old to newly built centres, including mosques, churches, synagogues, and Zoroastrian fire temples. Tehran has a very small third-generation Indian Sikh community with a local gurdwara that was visited by the Indian Prime Minister, Manmohan Singh in 2012.

== Geography ==
=== Location and subdivisions ===
The districts of Tehran

City of Tehran is bounded in the north by the southern end and the highest point of Alborz Mountain Range (Tochal Peak, 3,963m), in the east by a hilly stretch of Alborz (namely, Sorkheh Hesar National Park, part of Khojir National Park and the northeastern badlands), in the southeast by Raga Mountain and in the west and southwest by fertile meadows and many villages, fed by numerous rivers and streams, mainly Karaj and Jajrud.

The metropolis is divided into 22 municipal districts, each with its administrative center. Of the 22 municipal districts, 20 are located in Tehran County's Central District, while districts 1 and 20 are respectively located in the counties of Shemiranat and Ray.

Regions and municipal districts of Tehran

North:
District 1:
• Farmaniyeh
• Evin
• Darakeh
• Zaferaniyeh
• Mahmoodiyeh
• Velenjak
• Darband
• Golabdarreh
• Jamaran
• Dezashib
• Niavaran
• Darabad
• Tajrish
• Gheytariyeh
• Chizar
• Ozgol
• Aghdasiyeh
• Elahieh
• Jamshidiyeh
• Saadabad
• Kamraniyeh
District 2:
• Farahzad
• Shahrara
• Gisha
• Punak-e
Bahtari
• Saadat Abad
• Sadeghieh
• Shahrak-e Gharb
• Tarasht
• Tohid
District 3:
• Darus
• Davoodiyeh
• Ekhtiariyeh
• Golhak
• Vanak
• Jordan
District 4:
• Khak Sefid
• Hakimiyeh
• Lavizan
• Ozgol
• Pasdaran
• Resalat
• Shams Abad
• Shemiran-e-No
• Tehranpars
• Zargande
• Narmak
District 5:
• Bolvar-e
Ferdows
• Jannat Abad
• Ekbatan
• Punak

East:
District 8:
• Mo'allem
• Narmak
• Samangan
• Nezam Abad
District 13:
• Dowshan Tappe
• Niru Havaii
• Tehran-e-No
• Piroozi
District 14:
• Chaharsad
Dastgah
• Dulab
• Esfahanak
• Khorasan
• Sad Dastgah
District 15:
• Afsariyeh
• Bisim
• Khavaran
• Kiyanshahr
• Masoudiyeh
• Moshiriyeh

Center:
District 6:
• Amir Abad
• Arjantin
• Yousef Abad
• Park-e Laleh
District 7:
• Abbas Abad
• Behjat
Abad
• Emam
Hossein
• Sabalan
District 10:
• Beryanak
• Haft Chenar
• Salsabil
District 11:
• Dokhaniyat
• Lashkar
• Moniriyeh
• Sheikh Hadi
District 12:
• Baharestan
• Bazar-e Tehran
• Ferdowsi
• Gorgan
• Park-e Shahrr
• Pich-e Shemiran

South:
District 16:
• Ali Abad
• Bagh-e Azari
• Khazane
• Yakhchi Abad
• Javadiyeh
• Nazi Abad
District 17:
• Emamzade
Hasan
• Bagh Khazaneh
• Qal'e Morghi
District 19:
• Abdol Abad
• Khani Abad No
• Nemat Abad
District 20:
• Dolat Abad
• Javanmard-e
Ghassab
• Ebn
Babviyeh
• Hazrat-e
Abdol-Azim
• Sizdah-e
Aban
• Rey

West:
District 9:
• Jey
• Sar-Asyab
• Mehr Abad
District 18:
• Khalije Fars
• Yaft Abad
• Shad Abad
• Shahrak-e
Vali-Asr
• Tolid Daru
• Ferdows
District 21:
• Shahrak-e-Darya
• Bashgah-e
Naft
• Tehransar
• Shahrak-e-Pasdaran
• Shahrak-e-Azadi
• Vardavard
District 22:
• Bagh-e
Haj-Seif
• Kan
• Kuy-e
Sazman-e
Barname
• Park Chitgar
• Peykanshahr
• Stadium-e
Azadi
• Shahrak-e
Cheshmeh
• Shahrak-e
Rah-Ahan
• Shahrak-e
Omid • Shahid Baqeri
• Dehkade-ye-Olympic
• Daryache Chitgar
• Golestan

Municipal districts of Tehran

Name	Persian Name	County	Number of Municipal Regions	Area	Population	Population Density	Location within Tehran
District 1	منطقه ۱ – Mantaqe ye Yek	Shemiranat County	10	64.0 km^{2}	487,508	10,533/km^{2}	
District 2	منطقه ۲ – Mantaqe ye Do	Tehran County	9	64.0 km^{2}	701,303	14,964/km^{2}	
District 3	منطقه ۳ – Mantaqe ye Se	Tehran County	6	31.2 km^{2}	330,649	10,156/km^{2}	
District 4	منطقه ۴ – Mantaqe ye Chahār	Tehran County	9	61.4 km^{2}	919,001	14,943/km^{2}	
District 5	منطقه ۵ – Mantaqe ye Panj	Tehran County	7	52.9 km^{2}	858,346	18,320/km^{2}	
District 6	منطقه ۶ – Mantaqe ye Šeŝ	Tehran County	6	21.4 km^{2}	251,384	13,763/km^{2}	
District 7	منطقه ۷ – Mantaqe ye Haft	Tehran County	5	15.4 km^{2}	312,194	20,140/km^{2}	
District 8	منطقه ۸ – Mantaqe ye Haŝt	Tehran County	3	13.4 km^{2}	425,197	31,984/km^{2}	
District 9	منطقه ۹ – Mantaqe ye Noh	Tehran County	3	19.6 km^{2}	174,239	6,387/km^{2}	
District 10	منطقه ۱۰ – Mantaqe ye Dah	Tehran County	3	8.2 km^{2}	327,115	40,029/km^{2}	
District 11	منطقه ۱۱ – Mantaqe ye Yāzdah	Tehran County	4	12.6 km^{2}	307,940	25,743/km^{2}	
District 12	منطقه ۱۲ – Mantaqe ye Davāzdah	Tehran County	6	16.9 km^{2}	241,831	15,150/km^{2}	
District 13	منطقه ۱۳ – Mantaqe ye Sizdah	Tehran County	4	12.8 km^{2}	248,952	14,726/km^{2}	
District 14	منطقه ۱۴ – Mantaqe ye Ĉahārdah	Tehran County	6	24.3 km^{2}	515,795	21,370/km^{2}	
District 15	منطقه ۱۵ – Mantaqe ye Pānzdah	Tehran County	6	35.4 km^{2}	641,279	23,186/km^{2}	
District 16	منطقه ۱۶ – Mantaqe ye Ŝānzdah	Tehran County	6	18.1 km^{2}	268,406	16,238/km^{2}	
District 17	منطقه ۱۷ – Mantaqe ye Hefdah	Tehran County	3	8.2 km^{2}	273,231	33,276/km^{2}	
District 18	منطقه ۱۸ – Mantaqe ye Heĵdah	Tehran County	5	37.5 km^{2}	419,882	11,029/km^{2}	
District 19	منطقه ۱۹ – Mantaqe ye Nuzdah	Tehran County	3	20.3 km^{2}	261,027	12,809/km^{2}	
District 20	منطقه ۲۰ – Mantaqe ye Bist	Ray County	5	23.0 km^{2}	365,259	16,365/km^{2}	
District 21	منطقه ۲۱ – Mantaqe ye Bist-o-Yek	Tehran County	3	51.6 km^{2}	186,821	3,646/km^{2}	
District 22	منطقه ۲۲ – Mantaqe ye Bist-o-Do	Tehran County	4	54.0 km^{2}	176,347	3,025/km^{2}	

Northern Tehran is the wealthiest part of the city, with districts such as Zafaraniyeh, Jordan, Elahiyeh, Pasdaran, Kamranieh, Ajodanieh, Farmanieh, Darrous, Niavaran, Jamaran, Aghdasieh, Mahmoodieh, Velenjak, Qeytarieh, Ozgol and Ekhtiarieh. The city center houses government ministries and headquarters. Commercial centers are located further north.

=== Topography ===
Northern Tehran is at the foot of Alborz, starting at an elevation of 1,800 meters (5,900 ft), with many houses and streets on steep slopes and hills. There is a stretch of hills in the middle of the city (which historically divided Tehran and Shemiran) with its highest point at 1,500 metres (4,900 ft). Southwards and westwards of those hills, Tehran is less steep. On the east, there are numerous hills, with the highest point at 1,950 metres (6,400 ft). The southern end of Tehran (Rey) is at 1,100 metres (3,600 ft), next to a single mountain (Raga) at 1,500 metres (4,900 ft).

=== Climate ===
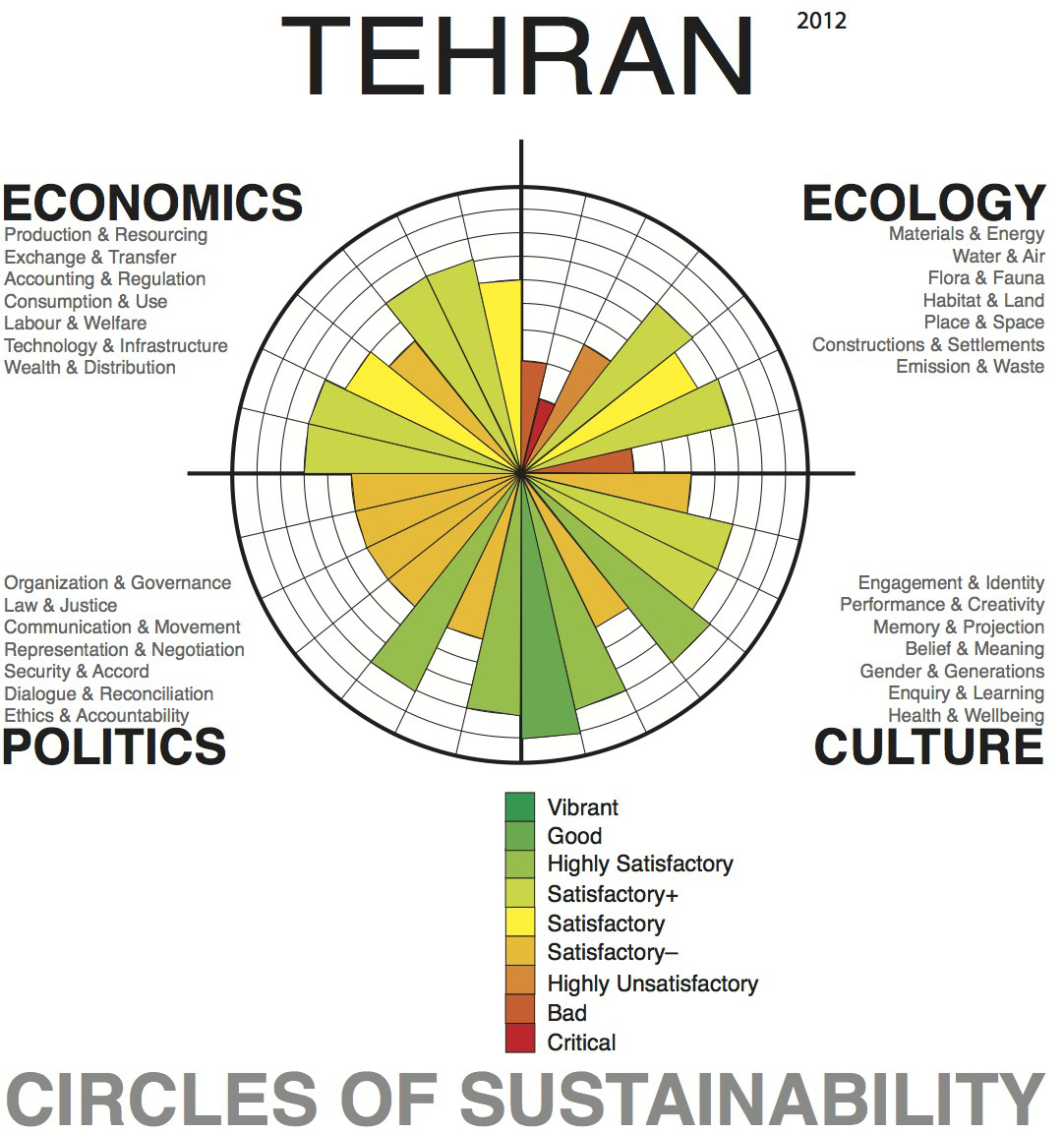
A 2012 urban sustainability analysis of the metropolitan area of Tehran, using the 'Circles of Sustainability' method of the UN Global Compact Cities Programme

Tehran lies at the southern foot of the Alborz Mountains and the northern edge of the Iranian Central Plateau, giving the city a complex climate. According to the Köppen climate classification system, the bulk of metropolitan Tehran is classified as a cold semi-arid (BSk), while lower elevation suburbs and plains (near Mehrābād Airport) verge on a hot semi-arid (BSh) classification. At the same time, the elevated northern districts (such as Shemiran) approach a Mediterranean climate (Csa) type.

The city's wide elevation range—from approximately 1,100 m above sea level in the southern plains to over 1,800 m in the northern suburbs—yields pronounced topographic micro-climates. The elevation rises up to 2,000 m (6,600 ft) at the end of Velenjak in northern Tehran. Northern parts of Tehran tend to be cooler, receive slightly more precipitation (including more snow), and retain more greenery. In contrast, the more open, lower-lying southern sections of the city experience stronger daytime heating, less relief through breezes, and larger temperature differences between day and night. The difference between daily maximum and minimum temperatures (known as diurnal range) can be modest (≈ 10–12 °C) in built-up urban zones but may exceed 15–20 °C in suburbs or peripheral areas during clear, dry nights.

Urban expansion, the "heat-island" effect, and reduced vegetation have contributed to modest upward shifts in mean temperatures, particularly during summer nights. The dominance of dry summers means that water management and green-space planning carry particular significance for Tehran's long-term habitability.

Summers in Tehran are long and dry. Daytime highs often soar to over 35 °C, and during peak heat waves they may approach or even exceed 40 °C. Nighttime minima during midsummer typically hover around 20–25 °C, though cooler nights are common in the northern districts. Winters are cool in central areas but are notably colder in the higher elevations north of the city: daytime highs in January average around 7–9 °C, while overnight lows in the city centre fall to near 0–2°C or slightly below and routinely dip below zero in the suburbs and mountain-adjacent zones.

Annual total rainfall for central Tehran averages roughly 230–300 mm. The wet season spans from late autumn through early spring (roughly November to May), while the summer months (June to September) are extremely dry and often see no measurable rainfall. Most precipitation falls from frontal systems moving in from the northwest and through the Alborz range, with occasional convective storms. Snowfall occurs almost every winter, though accumulation in central Tehran is usually brief, while the northern districts and Alborz foothills receive heavier and longer-lasting snow.

Air currents have a great effect on Tehran's weather. The prevailing wind blowing from the west causes the west of Tehran to always be exposed to fresh air. Although this wind brings smoke and pollution from the western industrial areas, its strong wind takes polluted air out of Tehran.

The main direction of the prevailing wind is northwest to southeast. Other air currents that blow in the area are:

1. Tochal breeze: With the rapid cooling of the Alborz mountain range at night, a local high-pressure center is formed on Mount Tochal. This cold current flows down the mountain because of high pressure. Thus, a gentle breeze blows into the city from the north at night.
2. Southern and southeastern regional winds: These winds blow from the desert plains in the hot months of the year.
3. Western winds: these winds are the Westerlies that affect Tehran throughout the year and can be called the prevailing wind.

==== Significant weather events ====
In February 2005, heavy snow covered all parts of Tehran. Snow depth was recorded as 15 cm (6 in) in the south and 100 cm (39 in) in the north. One newspaper reported that it had been the worst weather in 34 years. Ten thousand bulldozers and 13,000 municipal workers were deployed to keep the main roads open. On 5 and 6 January 2008, a wave of heavy snow and low temperatures covered Tehran in a thick layer of snow and ice, forcing the Council of Ministers to declare a state of emergency and close down the capital from 6 to 7 January. On 3 February 2014, Tehran received heavy snowfall, specifically in the northern parts of the city, with a depth of 2 metres (6.6 ft). In one week of successive snowfalls, roads were made impassable in some areas, with the temperature ranging from −8 to −16 °C (18 to 3 °F). On 3 June 2014, a severe thunderstorm with powerful microbursts created a haboob, engulfing Tehran in sand and dust and causing five deaths, with more than 57 injured. This event knocked down numerous trees and power lines. It struck between 17:00 and 18:00, dropping temperatures from 33 to 19 °C (91 to 66 °F) within an hour. The dramatic temperature drop was accompanied by wind gusts reaching nearly 118 km/h (73 mph).

In July and August 2025, Tehran experienced extreme heat and severe drought conditions, marking one of the most acute environmental crises in the city's recent history. Temperatures exceeded 40 °C during a prolonged heatwave, coinciding with the fifth consecutive year of below-average rainfall. Reservoir levels in the surrounding region fell, with water storage at Karaj Dam reduced by 58%, Lar by 34%, Taleghan by 32%, and the combined Latyan and Mamloo reservoirs by 47% compared to normal capacity. Inflows to major dams were reported to be 43% lower than the previous year. The water shortage prompted authorities to announce temporary public holidays and the closure of government offices and banks to conserve electricity and water.

==== Climate data ====
The highest recorded temperature was 43 °C (109 °F) on 3 July 1958 and 6 July 1975. The lowest recorded temperature was −15 °C (5 °F) on 8 January 1969.

Climate data for Tehran Geophysic, altitude: 1,418.6 m (4,654 ft) (1991–2010, temperature normals and precipitation 1991–2020, records 1991–2022)
Month	Jan	Feb	Mar	Apr	May	Jun	Jul	Aug	Sep	Oct	Nov	Dec	Year
Record high °C (°F)	17.0 (62.6)	22.7 (72.9)	28.4 (83.1)	32.0 (89.6)	36.0 (96.8)	40.6 (105.1)	41.6 (106.9)	40.9 (105.6)	37.3 (99.1)	32.0 (89.6)	24.0 (75.2)	19.6 (67.3)	41.6 (106.9)
Mean daily maximum °C (°F)	7.4 (45.3)	9.7 (49.5)	14.8 (58.6)	20.7 (69.3)	26.5 (79.7)	32.6 (90.7)	35.3 (95.5)	34.2 (93.6)	30.1 (86.2)	23.3 (73.9)	14.6 (58.3)	9.1 (48.4)	21.5 (70.7)
Daily mean °C (°F)	4.2 (39.6)	6.2 (43.2)	10.7 (51.3)	16.3 (61.3)	21.9 (71.4)	27.8 (82.0)	30.5 (86.9)	29.5 (85.1)	25.4 (77.7)	18.8 (65.8)	10.8 (51.4)	6.0 (42.8)	17.3 (63.2)
Mean daily minimum °C (°F)	0.8 (33.4)	2.5 (36.5)	6.6 (43.9)	11.7 (53.1)	16.5 (61.7)	22.1 (71.8)	25.1 (77.2)	24.1 (75.4)	20.2 (68.4)	14.3 (57.7)	7.3 (45.1)	2.7 (36.9)	12.8 (55.1)
Record low °C (°F)	−11.7 (10.9)	−8.2 (17.2)	−6.0 (21.2)	−1.8 (28.8)	4.5 (40.1)	11.8 (53.2)	15.4 (59.7)	13.6 (56.5)	10.0 (50.0)	6.4 (43.5)	−7.9 (17.8)	−7.2 (19.0)	−11.7 (10.9)
Average precipitation mm (inches)	47.4 (1.87)	38.7 (1.52)	51.9 (2.04)	40.5 (1.59)	17.3 (0.68)	3.6 (0.14)	3.2 (0.13)	2.5 (0.10)	2.0 (0.08)	17.2 (0.68)	36.1 (1.42)	39.5 (1.56)	299.9 (11.81)
Average precipitation days	10.0	9.1	11.2	9.3	8.5	2.7	1.6	0.9	1.2	4.1	8.4	10.1	77.1
Average snowy days	5.1	3.3	2.0	0.0	0.0	0.0	0.0	0.0	0.0	0.1	0.3	2.9	13.7
Mean monthly sunshine hours	157.3	172.3	198.1	213.8	279.1	342.4	345.2	346.7	308.4	257.1	180.1	146.8	2,947.3
Source: Iran Meteorological Organization (records (temperatures), (precipitation), (humidity), (days with precipitation), (sunshine)

Climate data for Tehran Mehrabad, altitude: 1,191 m (3,907 ft) (1991–2020 normals, extremes 1951–present) (Note: Rainy days from parameter codes 46 and 71 from the NOAA source)
Month	Jan	Feb	Mar	Apr	May	Jun	Jul	Aug	Sep	Oct	Nov	Dec	Year
Record high °C (°F)	19.6 (67.3)	24.4 (75.9)	30.3 (86.5)	33.4 (92.1)	37.0 (98.6)	42.2 (108.0)	43.0 (109.4)	42.4 (108.3)	38.4 (101.1)	33.4 (92.1)	26.4 (79.5)	21.0 (69.8)	43.0 (109.4)
Mean daily maximum °C (°F)	8.5 (47.3)	11.1 (52.0)	16.2 (61.2)	22.3 (72.1)	28.2 (82.8)	34.3 (93.7)	36.9 (98.4)	35.8 (96.4)	31.6 (88.9)	24.6 (76.3)	15.7 (60.3)	10.2 (50.4)	23.0 (73.3)
Daily mean °C (°F)	4.7 (40.5)	7.0 (44.6)	11.8 (53.2)	17.6 (63.7)	23.2 (73.8)	28.8 (83.8)	31.4 (88.5)	30.5 (86.9)	26.3 (79.3)	19.6 (67.3)	11.6 (52.9)	6.5 (43.7)	18.3 (64.9)
Mean daily minimum °C (°F)	1.3 (34.3)	3.0 (37.4)	7.2 (45.0)	12.6 (54.7)	17.6 (63.7)	22.5 (72.5)	25.2 (77.4)	24.6 (76.3)	20.7 (69.3)	14.8 (58.6)	7.8 (46.0)	3.2 (37.8)	13.4 (56.1)
Record low °C (°F)	−15.0 (5.0)	−13.0 (8.6)	−8.0 (17.6)	−4.0 (24.8)	2.4 (36.3)	5.0 (41.0)	14.0 (57.2)	13.0 (55.4)	9.0 (48.2)	2.8 (37.0)	−7.2 (19.0)	−13.0 (8.6)	−15.0 (5.0)
Average precipitation mm (inches)	31.7 (1.25)	32.9 (1.30)	42.5 (1.67)	34.8 (1.37)	14.0 (0.55)	2.3 (0.09)	2.3 (0.09)	1.4 (0.06)	0.9 (0.04)	13.6 (0.54)	30.9 (1.22)	31.8 (1.25)	239.1 (9.43)
Average snowfall cm (inches)	24.0 (9.4)	11.6 (4.6)	1.7 (0.7)	0.1 (0.0)	0.0 (0.0)	0.0 (0.0)	0.0 (0.0)	0.0 (0.0)	0.0 (0.0)	0.0 (0.0)	0.0 (0.0)	7.3 (2.9)	44.7 (17.6)
Average precipitation days (≥ 1.0 mm)	4.8	5.4	5.9	5.2	3.7	0.8	0.5	0.3	0.2	2.5	4.9	5.3	39.5
Average rainy days	6	7.1	10.3	9.8	6.9	2	1.6	0.9	0.7	5.3	8.6	7.8	67
Average snowy days	5.1	2.9	1.1	0.1	0.0	0.0	0.0	0.0	0.0	0.0	0.4	2.7	12.3
Average relative humidity (%)	57	51	43	39	31	25	25	26	28	36	50	58	39
Mean monthly sunshine hours	176.0	178.0	208.0	232.0	284.0	339.0	344.0	344.0	305.0	254.0	181.0	164.0	3,009
Average ultraviolet index	2	3	3	5	6	7	7	7	5	4	3	2	5
Source 1: NOAA NCEI (snowfall 1981–2010)
Source 2: Iran Meteorological Organization (records), (snow/sleet days 1951–2005), Weather Atlas (UV)

Climate data for Tehran-Shomal (north of Tehran), altitude: 1,549.1 m (5,082 ft) (1988–2010, temperature normals, precipitation, and snow days 1988–2020, records 1988–present)
Month	Jan	Feb	Mar	Apr	May	Jun	Jul	Aug	Sep	Oct	Nov	Dec	Year
Record high °C (°F)	17.2 (63.0)	23.5 (74.3)	29.0 (84.2)	32.4 (90.3)	34.6 (94.3)	40.4 (104.7)	41.8 (107.2)	42.0 (107.6)	36.9 (98.4)	31.2 (88.2)	23.6 (74.5)	19.6 (67.3)	42.0 (107.6)
Mean daily maximum °C (°F)	6.9 (44.4)	9.1 (48.4)	14.3 (57.7)	20.2 (68.4)	26.1 (79.0)	32.2 (90.0)	34.9 (94.8)	33.9 (93.0)	29.8 (85.6)	22.9 (73.2)	14.3 (57.7)	9.0 (48.2)	21.1 (70.0)
Daily mean °C (°F)	3.0 (37.4)	4.8 (40.6)	9.6 (49.3)	15.0 (59.0)	20.3 (68.5)	26.1 (79.0)	28.9 (84.0)	27.8 (82.0)	23.7 (74.7)	17.3 (63.1)	9.8 (49.6)	5.0 (41.0)	15.9 (60.7)
Mean daily minimum °C (°F)	−1.0 (30.2)	0.5 (32.9)	4.8 (40.6)	9.8 (49.6)	14.5 (58.1)	19.9 (67.8)	22.9 (73.2)	21.6 (70.9)	17.5 (63.5)	11.6 (52.9)	5.2 (41.4)	1.0 (33.8)	10.7 (51.2)
Record low °C (°F)	−13.0 (8.6)	−11.0 (12.2)	−8.0 (17.6)	−2.4 (27.7)	0.0 (32.0)	12.0 (53.6)	13.0 (55.4)	10.6 (51.1)	8.8 (47.8)	2.6 (36.7)	−8.3 (17.1)	−9.6 (14.7)	−13.0 (8.6)
Average precipitation mm (inches)	56.6 (2.23)	64.2 (2.53)	70.1 (2.76)	54.9 (2.16)	25.6 (1.01)	3.9 (0.15)	5.0 (0.20)	3.9 (0.15)	3.7 (0.15)	24.5 (0.96)	53.8 (2.12)	61.1 (2.41)	427.3 (16.83)
Average precipitation days	12.3	10.9	12.3	10.0	8.9	3.3	3.4	1.6	1.3	5.8	8.6	10.7	89.1
Average snowy days	7.3	5.6	2.3	0.1	0.1	0	0	0	0	0	1.0	4.0	20.4
Average relative humidity (%)	67	59	53	44	39	30	31	31	33	44	57	66	46
Mean monthly sunshine hours	135.8	146.4	185.1	215.0	274.6	322.8	331.8	327.5	292.6	245.5	171.5	135.8	2,784.4
Source 1:
Source 2:

=== Environmental issues ===
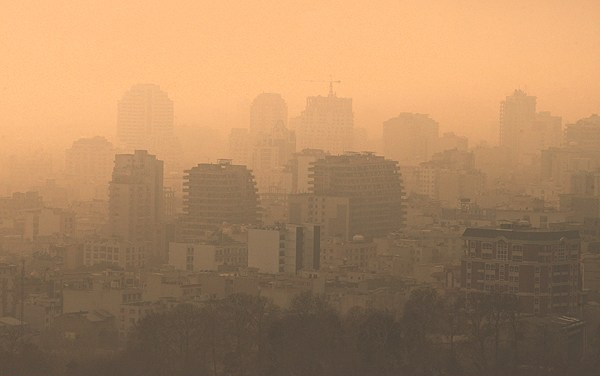
Heavy air pollution in Tehran

Tehran is located near two major fault lines. The city's wide elevation range—from approximately 1,100 m above sea level in the southern plains to over 1,800 m in the northern suburbs—yields pronounced topographic micro-climates. Tehran suffers from severe air pollution, 80% of it due to cars. The remaining 20% is due to industrial pollution. Other estimates suggest that motorcycles account for 30% of air and 50% of noise pollution in Tehran. The city is considered one of the strongest sources of greenhouse gas emissions in the Middle East. Enhanced concentration of carbon dioxide over Tehran, that likely originate from the anthropogenic urban sources in the city, is easily detectable from satellite observations throughout the year. A plan to move the capital has been discussed many times in prior years, due mainly to the environmental issues of the region. In 2010, the government announced that "for security and administrative reasons, the plan to move the capital from Tehran has been finalized." There are plans to relocate 163 state firms and several universities from Tehran to avoid damages from a potential earthquake.

City officials are engaged in a battle to reduce air pollution. They have, for instance, encouraged taxis and buses to convert from petrol engines to compressed natural gas. The government has set up a "Traffic Zone" covering the city centre during peak traffic hours. Entering and driving inside this zone is only allowed with a special permit. There are efforts to raise people's awareness of the hazards of pollution. Pollution Indicator Boards have been installed all around the city to monitor the level of particulate matter (PM2.5/PM10), nitrogen dioxide (NO_{2}), ozone (O_{3}), sulfur dioxide (SO_{2}), and carbon monoxide (CO).

== Economy ==
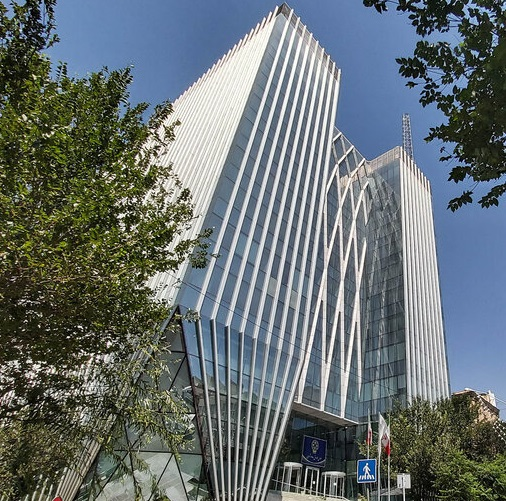
Tehran Stock Exchange

Tehran is the economic centre of Iran. About 30% of Iran's public-sector workforce and 45% of its large industrial firms are located in the city, and almost half of these workers are employed by the government. Most of the remainder of workers are factory workers, shopkeepers, laborers, and transport workers.

Few foreign companies operate in Tehran, because of the government's complex international relations. But before the 1979 Revolution, many foreign companies were active in Iran. Tehran's present-day modern industries include the manufacturing of automobiles, electronics and electrical equipment, weaponry, textiles, sugar, cement, and chemical products. It is also a leading centre for the sale of carpets and furniture. The oil refining companies of Pars Oil, Speedy, and Behran are based in Tehran.

Tehran relies heavily on private cars, buses, motorcycles, and taxis, and is one of the most car-dependent cities in the world. The Tehran Stock Exchange, is a full member of the World Federation of Exchanges and a founding member of the Federation of Euro-Asian Stock Exchanges.

=== Fashion industry ===
Design, manufacturing, distribution, marketing, retail, advertising, and other sectors of the fashion industry in Tehran have been able to grow significantly according to the needs of the country. In particular, a large number of male and female models are working in Tehran's fashion advertising and promotion sections. Despite the lack of adequate laws to support models, payments to female models have been considered high. Also, modeling of children is usually prohibited in Tehran. Clothing manufacturers are closely related to other fashion sectors in Tehran. For example, the manufacturers of women's boots and bodysuits have strengthened their exports and branding in other countries by using this connection.

=== Shopping ===
Tehran has a wide range of shopping centers and is home to over 60 modern shopping malls. The city has a number of commercial districts, including those located at Valiasr, Davudie, and Zaferanie. The largest old bazaars are the Grand Bazaar and the Bazaar of Tajrish. Iran Mall is the largest mall in the world in area. Most of the international branded stores and upper-class shops are in the northern and western parts of the city. Tehran's retail business is growing with several newly built malls and shopping centres. Shoe (Mostly women's boots) manufacturing companies in Tehran can be reached in the malls.

=== Tourism ===
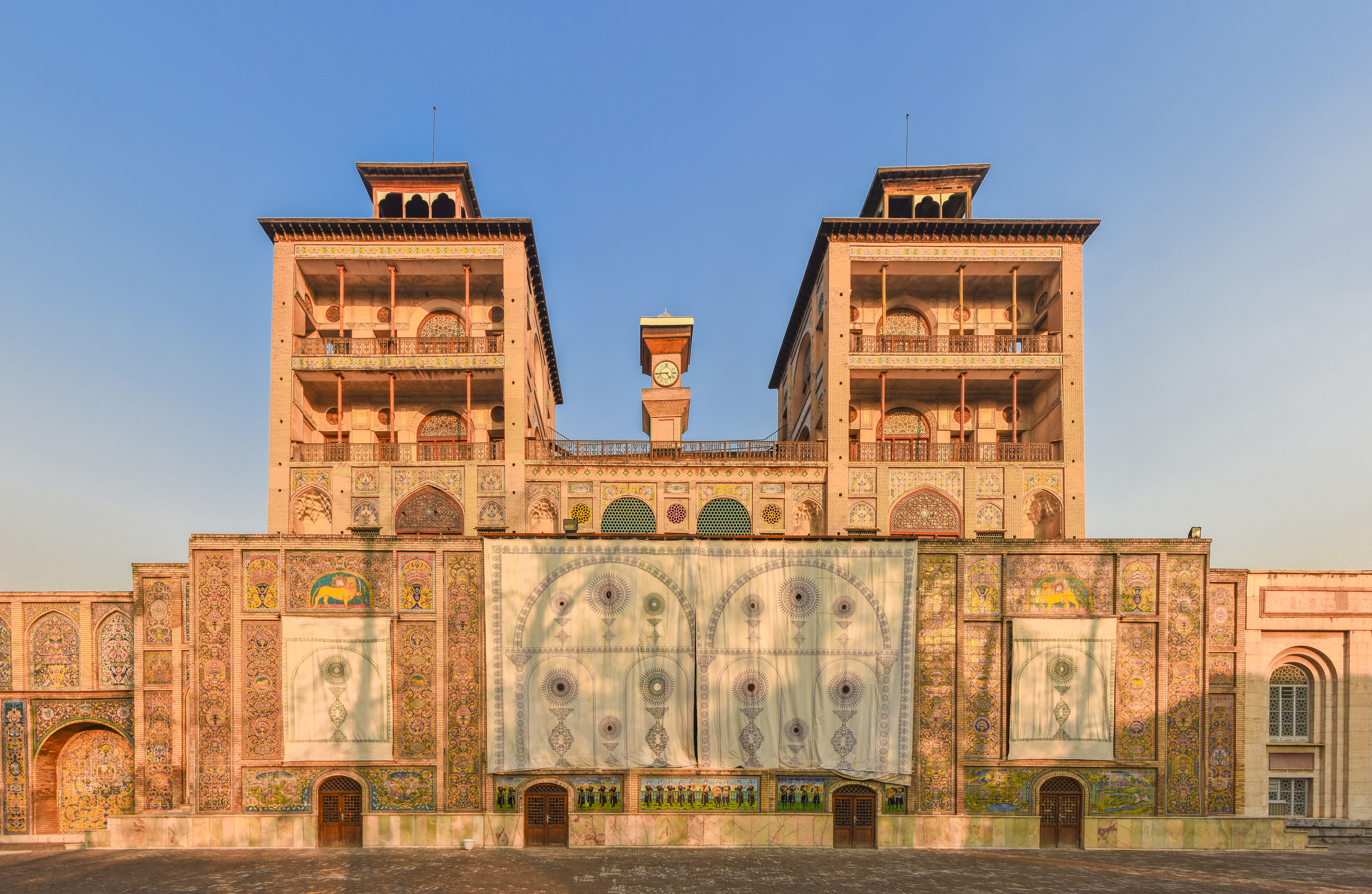
Golestan Palace, One of the oldest historic monuments in the city. UNESCO World Heritage Site

Tehran, as one of the main tourist destinations in Iran, has a wealth of cultural attractions. It is home to royal complexes of Golestan, Saadabad, and Niavaran, which were built under the reign of the country's last two monarchies. There are several historic, artistic, and scientific museums in Tehran, including:

- National Museum
- Malek Museum
- Cinema Museum at Ferdows Garden
- Abgineh Museum
- Museum of the Qasr Prison
- Carpet Museum
- Safir Office Machines Museum
- Palestine Square Countdown Clock

The Museum of Contemporary Art hosts works of famous artists such as Van Gogh, Pablo Picasso, and Andy Warhol. The Iranian Imperial Crown Jewels, one of the largest jewel collections in the world, are on display at Tehran's National Jewelry Museum. Several cultural and trade exhibitions take place in Tehran, which are mainly operated by the country's International Exhibitions Company. The annual International Book Fair is known to the international publishing world as one of the most important publishing events in Asia.

== Infrastructure ==
=== Highways and streets ===
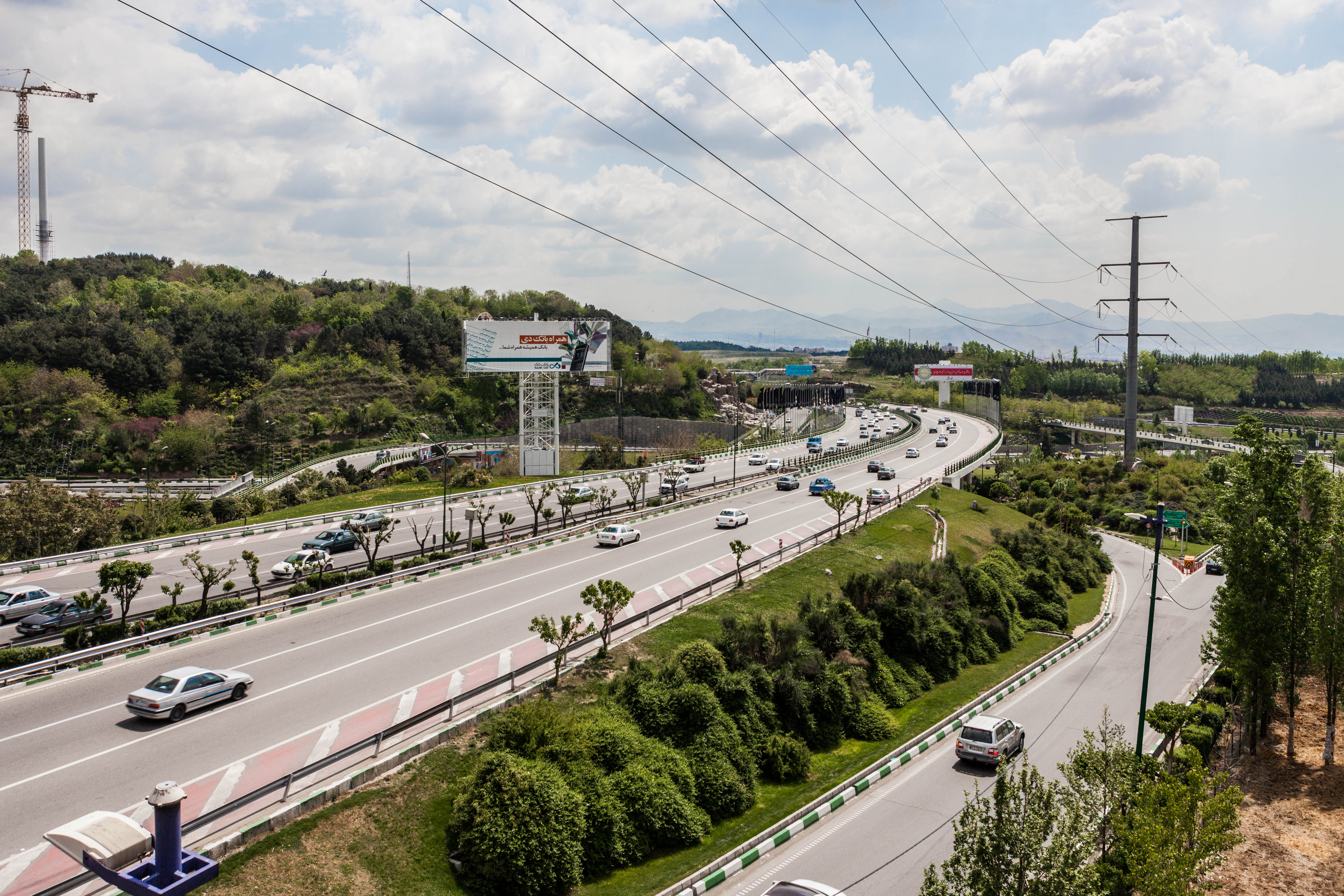
Fajr Bridge, Hemmat Expressway

Following the Islamic Revolution in 1979, the political system changed from constitutional monarchy to Islamic republic. Then the construction of political power in the country needed to change so that new spectrums of political power and decision-making centers emerged in Iran. Motives, desires, and actions of these new political power decision-making centers in Iran made them rename streets and public places throughout the country, especially Tehran. For example Shahyad square changed to Azadi square and Pahlavi street changed to Valiasr street. The metropolis of Tehran is equipped with a large network of highways and interchanges.

According to the head of Tehran Municipality's Environment and Sustainable Development Office, Tehran was designed to have a capacity of about 300,000 cars, but more than five million cars are on the roads. The automotive industry has recently developed, but international sanctions influence the production processes periodically. According to local media, Tehran has more than 200,000 taxis plying the roads daily, with several types of taxi available in the city. Airport taxis have a higher cost per kilometer as opposed to regular green and yellow taxis in the city.

=== Buses ===
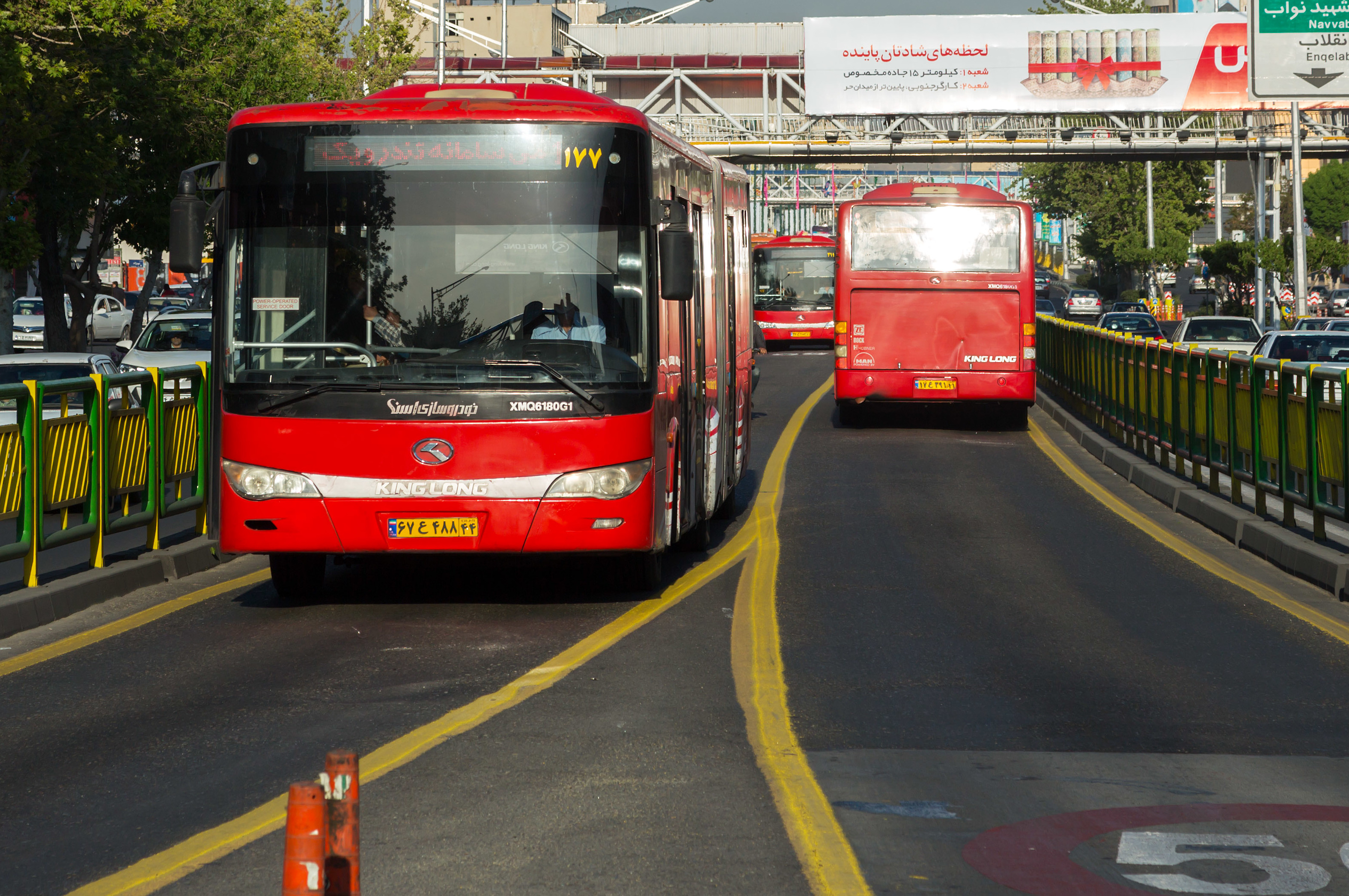
Tehran's bus rapid transit

Buses have served the city since the 1920s. Tehran's transport system includes conventional buses, trolleybuses, and bus rapid transit (BRT). The city's four major bus stations include the South Terminal, the East Terminal, the West Terminal, and the northcentral Beyhaghi Terminal.

The trolleybus system was opened in 1992, using a fleet of 65 articulated trolleybuses built by Czech Republic's Škoda. This was the first trolleybus system in Iran. In 2005, trolleybuses were operating on five routes, all starting at Imam Hossein Square. Two routes running northeastwards operated almost entirely in a segregated busway located in the middle of the wide carriageway along Damavand Street, stopping only at purpose-built stops located about every 500 metres along the routes, effectively making these routes trolleybus-BRT (but they were not called such). The other three trolleybus routes ran south and operated in mixed traffic. Both route sections were served by limited-stop services and local (making all stops) services. A 3.2-kilometer extension from Shoosh Square to Rah Ahan Square was opened in March 2010. Visitors in 2014 found that the trolleybus system had closed, apparently sometime in 2013. However, it reopened in March 2016, operating on a single 1.8-km route between Meydan-e-Khorasan (Khorasan Square) and Bozorgrah-e-Be'sat. Around 30 vehicles had been refurbished and returned to service. Extensions were planned.

Tehran's bus rapid transit (BRT) was officially inaugurated in 2008. It has 10 lines with some 215 stations in different areas of the city. As of 2011, the BRT system had a network of 100 km (62 mi), transporting 1.8 million passengers on a daily basis.

=== Railway and subway ===
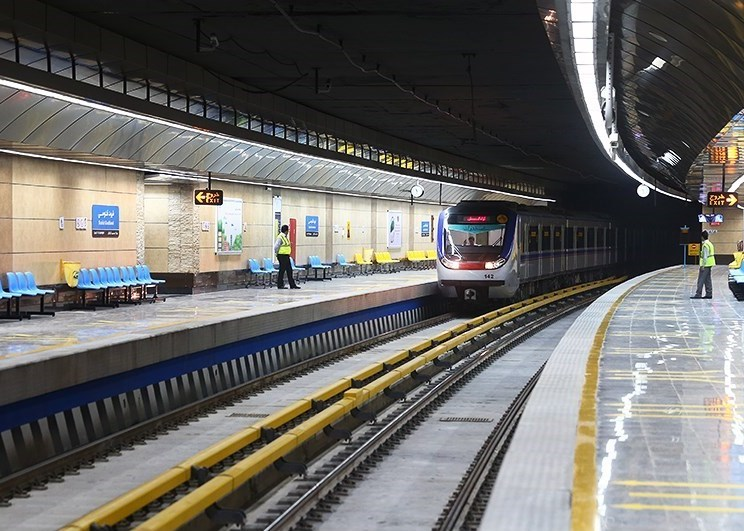
Tehran Metro is the largest metro system in the Middle East

Tehran has a central railway station that connects services round the clock to various cities in the country, along with a Tehran–Europe train line also running. The feasibility study and conceptual planning of the construction of Tehran's subway system were started in the 1970s.

List of Tehran Metro Lines
Line	Opening	Length	Stations	Type
1	2001	70 km (43 mi)	32	Metro
2	2000	26 km (16 mi)	22	Metro
3	2012	37 km (23 mi)	24	Metro
4	2008	22 km (14 mi)	22	Metro
5	1999	43 km (27 mi)	11	Commuter rail
6	2019	9 km (5.6 mi)	3	Metro
7	2017	13.5 km (8.4 mi)	8	Metro
Metro Subtotal:		177.5 km (110 mi)	111	
Total:		220.5 km (137 mi)	122	

=== Airport ===
Tehran is served by the international airports of Mehrabad and Imam Khomeini. Mehrabad Airport, an old airport in western Tehran that doubles as a military base, is mainly used for domestic and charter flights. Imam Khomeini Airport, located 50 kilometres (31 miles) south of the city, handles the main international flights.

=== Parks and green spaces ===
There are over 2,100 parks within the metropolis of Tehran, with one of the oldest being Jamshidie Park, which was first established as a private garden for Qajar prince Jamshid Davallu, and was then dedicated to the last empress of Iran, Farah Pahlavi. The total green space within Tehran stretches over 12,600 hectares, covering over 20 percent of the city's area. The Parks and Green Spaces Organization of Tehran was established in 1960, and is responsible for the protection of the urban nature present in the city.

Tehran's Birds Garden is the largest bird park in Iran. There is also a zoo located on the Tehran–Karaj Expressway, housing over 290 species within an area of about five hectares. In 2009, the Ab-o-Atash Park ("Water and Fire park") was founded. Its main features are an open water fountain area for cooling in the hot climate, fire towers, and an amphitheatre.

=== Energy ===
Fresh water resources of Tehran province in 2017
1. Groundwater (37.0%)
2. Sewage treatment (63.0%)

Greater Tehran is supplied by surface water from the Lar dam on the Lar River in the northeast of the city, the Latyan dam on the Jajrood River in the north, the Karaj River in the northwest, as well as by groundwater in the vicinity of the city. The city experiences stark water supply inequalities: impoverished districts struggle with inadequate water provision and hazardous water quality, while affluent areas are largely exempt from these hardships.

According to the national energy roadmap, the government plans to promote green technology to increase the nominal capacity of power plants from 74 gigawatts to over 120 gigawatts by the end of 2025. Solar panels have been installed in Pardisan Park for green electricity production, said Masoumeh Ebtekar, head of the Department of Environment.

== Education ==
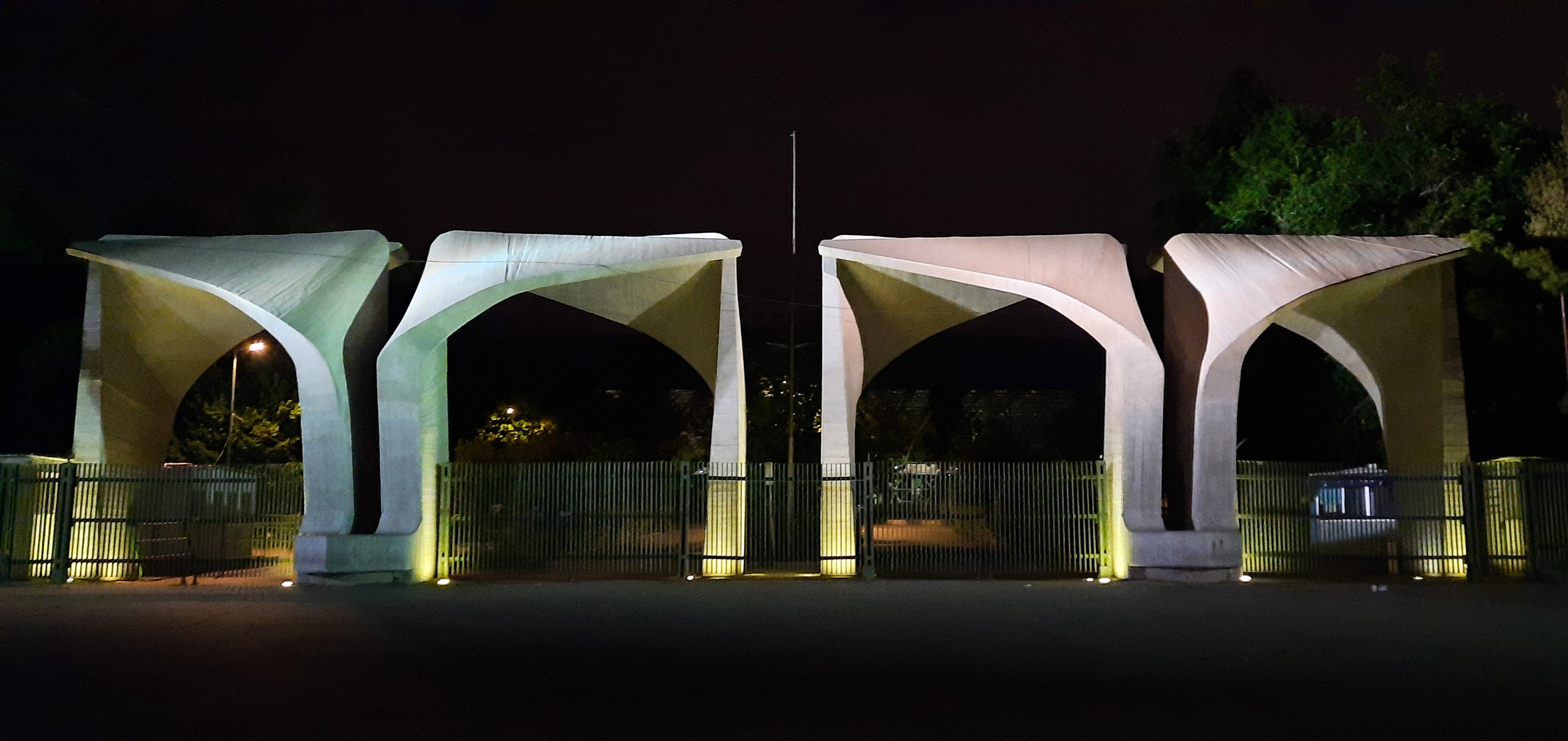
The University of Tehran is the oldest modern university of Iran

Tehran is the largest and most important educational center in Iran. There are a total of nearly 50 major colleges and universities in Greater Tehran. Since the establishment of Dar ol Fonun by the order of Amir Kabir in the mid-19th century, Tehran has amassed a large number of institutions of higher education. Some of these institutions have played crucial roles in the unfolding of Iranian political events. Samuel M. Jordan, whom Jordan Avenue in Tehran was named after, was one of the founding pioneers of the American College of Tehran, which was one of the first modern high schools in the Middle East. Tehran is home to Iran's largest military academy and several religious schools and seminaries.

Among major educational institutions located in Tehran, Amirkabir University of Technology (Tehran Polytechnic), University of Tehran, Sharif University of Technology, and Tehran University of Medical Sciences are the most prestigious. Other major universities located in Tehran include Tehran University of Art, Allameh Tabatabaei University, K. N. Toosi University of Technology, Shahid Beheshti University (Melli University), Kharazmi University, Iran University of Medical Sciences, Islamic Azad University, International Institute of Earthquake Engineering and Seismology, Iran's Polymer and Petrochemical Institute, Shahed University, and Tarbiat Modarres University. Sharif University of Technology, Amirkabir University of Technology, Iran University of Science and Technology and K. N. Toosi University of Technology also located in Tehran are nationally well known for taking in the top undergraduate Engineering and Science students; and internationally recognized for training competent undergraduate students. It has probably the highest percentage of graduates who seek higher education abroad.

== Culture ==
Iranian festivals are held in Tehran along with regional and western festivals. Nowruz, Chaharshanbe Suri, Sizdah Be-dar, Yaldā Night, Valentine's Day and Halloween have been popular festivals in recent decades.

=== Architecture ===
The oldest surviving architectural monuments are from the Qajar and Pahlavi eras. In Greater Tehran, monuments dating back to the Seljuk era remain as well; notably the Toqrol Tower in Ray. Rashkan Castle, dating back to the ancient Parthian Empire, of which some artifacts are housed at the National Museum; and the Bahram fire temple, which remains since the Sassanian Empire. Tehran only had a small population until the late 18th century but it began to take a more considerable role in Iranian society after it was chosen as the capital city. Despite the regular occurrence of earthquakes during the Qajar period and after, some historic buildings remain from that era. Tehran is Iran's primate city, and is considered to have the most modernized infrastructure in the country. However, the gentrification of old neighbourhoods and the demolition of buildings of cultural significance have caused concerns.

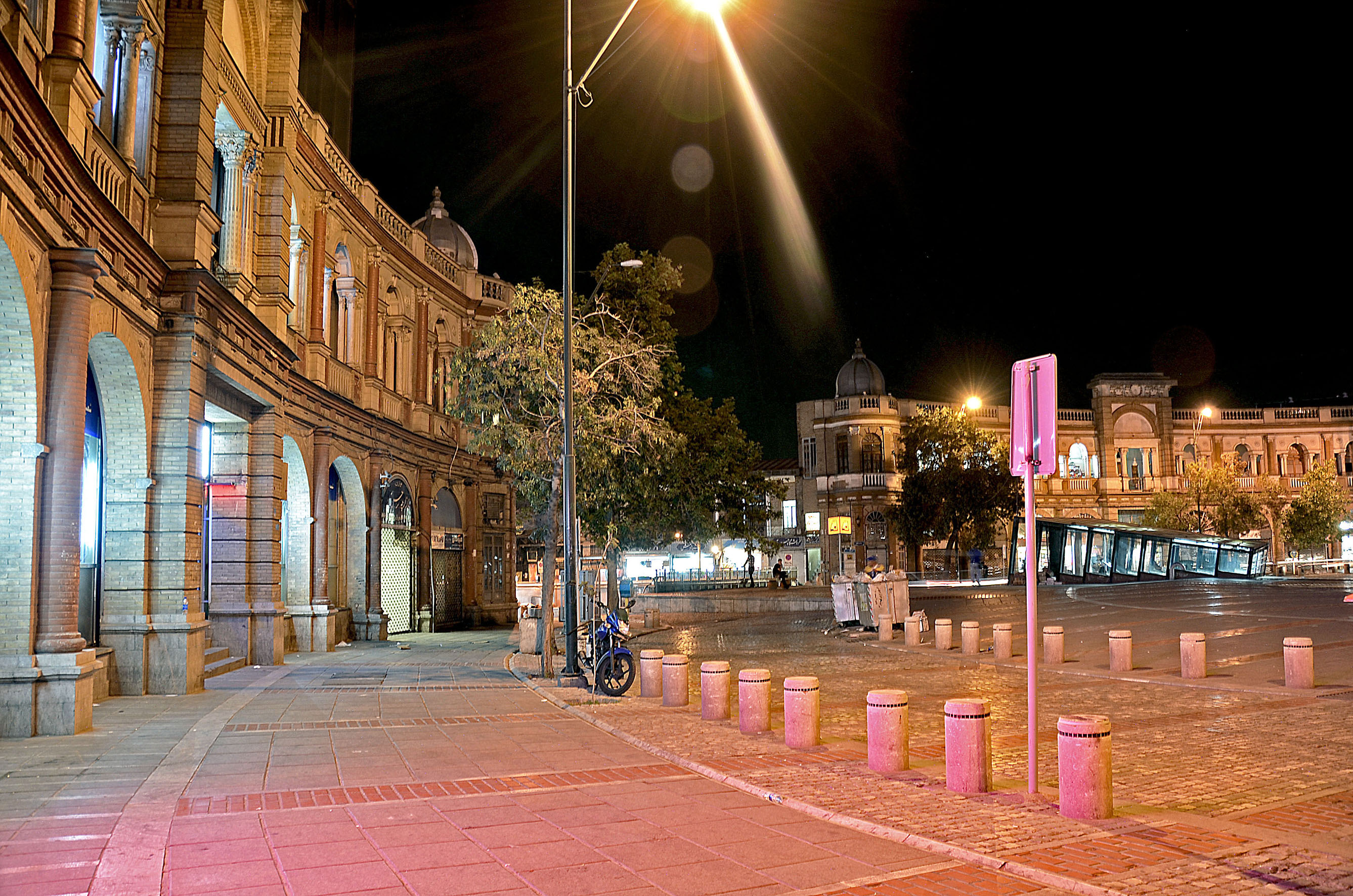
Hasanabad Square

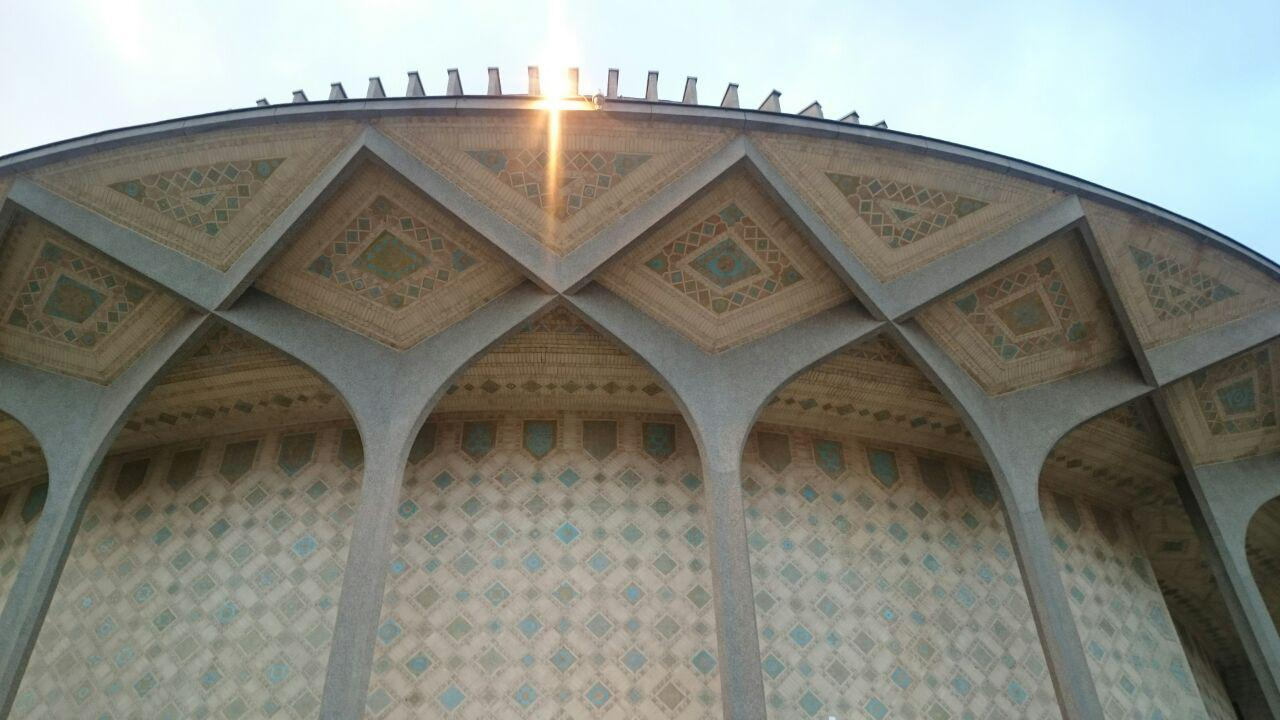
A view of the building of the City Theater of Tehran

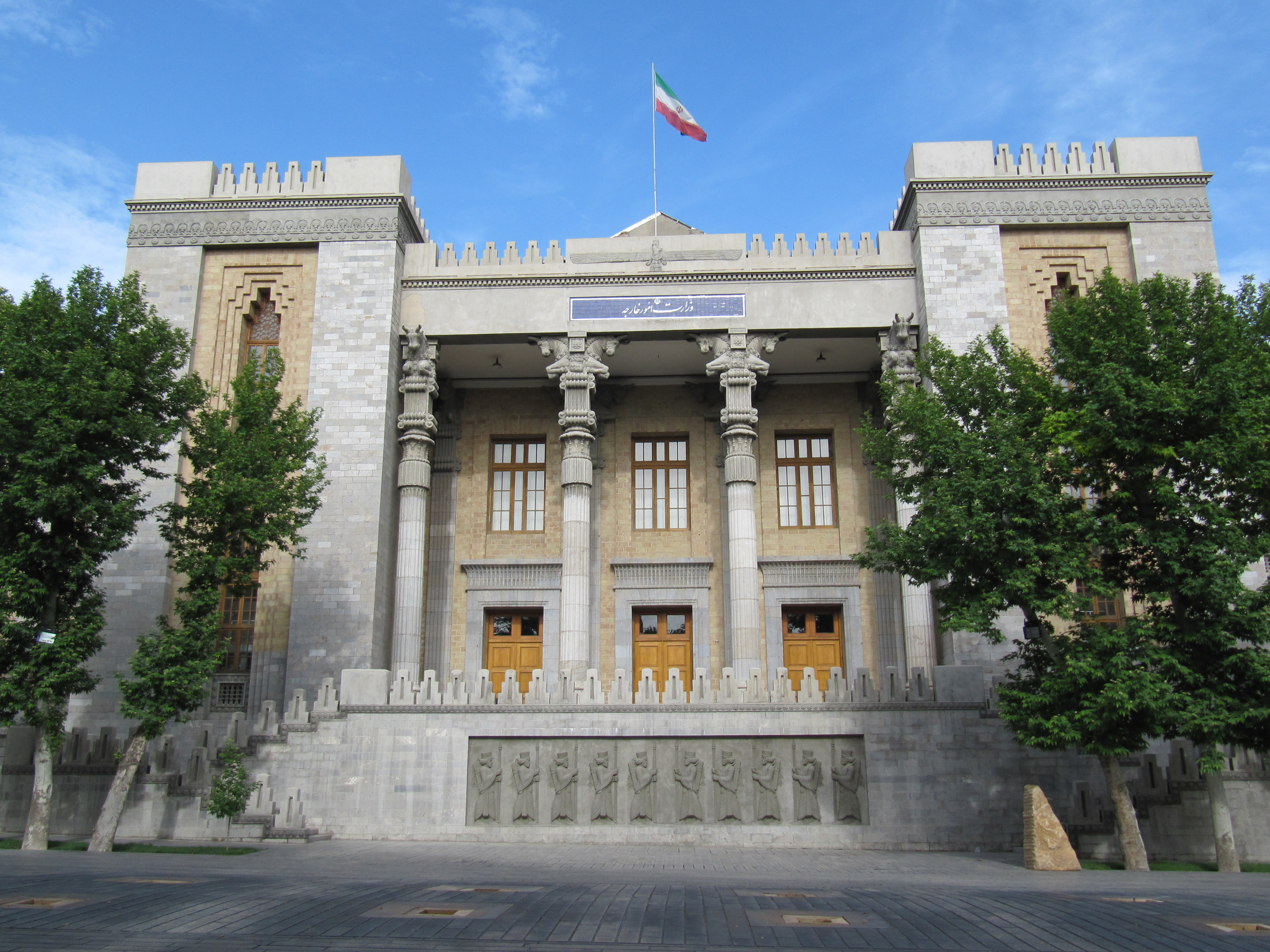
Police House,
the National Garden

Tehran was previously a low-rise city because of seismic activity in the region, but modern high-rise developments have been built in recent decades to service its growing population. There have been no major quakes in Tehran since 1830. Tehran International Tower is the tallest skyscraper in Iran. It is 54-stories tall and located in the northern district of Yusef Abad. The Azadi Tower, a memorial built under the reign of the Pahlavi dynasty, has long been the most famous symbol of Tehran. Originally constructed in commemoration of the 2,500th year of the foundation of the Imperial State of Iran, it combines elements of the architecture of the Achaemenid and Sassanid eras with post-classical Iranian architecture. The Milad Tower, which is the sixth tallest tower and the 24th-tallest freestanding structure in the world, is the city's other famous landmark tower. Leila Araghian's Tabiat Bridge, the largest pedestrian overpass in Tehran, was completed in 2014 and is also considered a landmark.

=== Fashion and clothing ===
The city has produced many notable Iranian design houses and clothing companies. Fashion events are also held in some areas of the city. Many famous Iranian models were born in Tehran, including Nazanin Afshin-Jam, Cameron Alborzian, Sahar Biniaz, Elnaaz Norouzi, Shermine Shahrivar and Sadaf Taherian. Women of Tehran widely used over-the-knee and leather boots after 2000s.

=== Theater ===
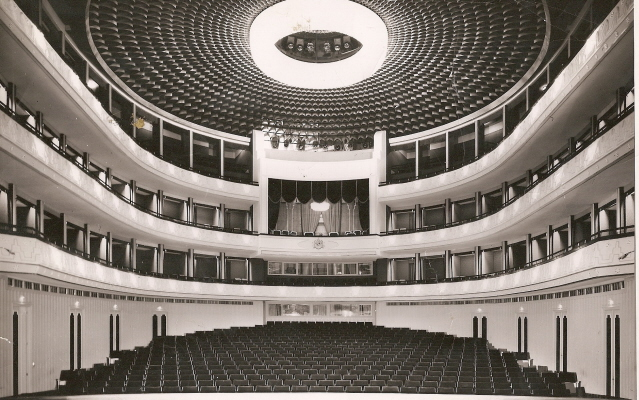
The Roodaki Hall, Tehran

Under the reign of the Qajars, Tehran was home to the royal theatre of Tekye Dowlat, located to the southeast of the Golestan Palace, in which traditional and religious performances were observed. It was eventually demolished and replaced with a bank building in 1947, following the reforms during the reign of Reza Shah.

Before the 1979 Revolution, the Iranian national stage had become the most famous performing scene for known international artists and troupes in the Middle East, with the Vahdat Hall, formerly but very much still known as Roodaki Hall (spelled in multiple ways in English), constructed to function as the national stage for opera and ballet. The hall was inaugurated in October 1967 and named after prominent Persian poet Rudaki. It is home to the Tehran Symphony Orchestra, the Tehran Opera Orchestra, and the Iranian National Ballet Company.

The City Theater of Tehran, one of Iran's biggest theatre complexes, which contains several performance halls, was opened in 1972. It was built at the initiative and presidency of Empress Farah Pahlavi, and was designed by architect Ali Sardar Afkhami, constructed within five years.

One of the gathering centers of cabarets in old Tehran was Laleh-Zar Street. Famous Persian cabarets were active in the city until 1979. They also introduced many domestic artists. In common language, cabaret was sometimes called "home of dance" or "dancing place".

The annual events of Fajr Theater Festival and Tehran Puppet Theater Festival take place in Tehran.

=== Cinema ===
The first movie theater in Tehran was established by Mirza Ebrahim Khan in 1904. Until the early 1930s, there were 15 theaters in Tehran province and 11 in other provinces. Most of the movie theatres are located downtown. The complexes of Kourosh Cinema, Mellat Gallery and Cineplex, Azadi Cinema, and Cinema Farhang are among the most popular cinema complexes in Tehran. Several film festivals are held in Tehran, including Fajr Film Festival, Children and Youth Film Festival, House of Cinema Festival, Mobile Film and Photo Festival, Nahal Festival, Roshd Film Festival, Tehran Animation Festival, Tehran Short Film Festival, and Urban Film Festival.

=== Music and dance ===
There are a variety of concert halls in Tehran. An organization like the Roudaki Culture and Art Foundation has five different venues where more than 500 concerts take place this year. Vahdat Hall, Roudaki Hall, Ferdowsi Hall, Hafez Hall and Azadi Theater are the top five venues in Tehran, where classical, pop, traditional, rock or solo concerts take place.

Erotic dancers were active and trained in Tehran until the 1979 revolution. But after this date, because of the policies of the new government, these activities were completely banned.

=== Sports ===
Football and volleyball are the city's most popular sports, while wrestling, basketball, and futsal are also major parts of the city's sporting culture. Ice hockey and rugby are also popular. 12 ski resorts operate in Iran, the most famous being Tochal, Dizin, and Shemshak, all within one to three hours from the city of Tehran.

Tochal's resort is the world's fifth-highest ski resort at over 3,730 m (12,240 ft) above sea level at its highest point. It is also the world's nearest ski resort to a capital city. The resort was opened in 1976, shortly before the 1979 Revolution. It is equipped with an 8 km (5 mi) long gondola lift that covers a huge vertical distance. There are two parallel chair ski lifts in Tochal that reach 3,900 m (12,800 ft) high near Tochal's peak, rising higher than the gondola's seventh station, which is higher than any of the European ski resorts. From the Tochal peak, there are views of the Alborz range, including the 5,610-metre-high (18,406 ft) Mount Damavand, a dormant volcano.

Tehran is the site of the national stadium of Azadi, the biggest stadium by capacity in West Asia, where many of the top matches of Iran's Premier League are held. The stadium is a part of the Azadi Sport Complex, which was originally built to host the 7th Asian Games in September 1974. This was the first time the Asian Games were hosted in West Asia. Tehran played host to 3,010 athletes from 25 countries/NOCs, which was at the time the highest number of participants since the inception of the Games. That followed hosting the 6th AFC Asian Cup in June 1976, and then the first West Asian Games in November 1997. The success of the games led to the creation of the West Asian Games Federation (WAGF), and the intention of hosting the games every two years. The city had also hosted the final of the 1968 AFC Asian Cup. Several FIVB Volleyball World League courses have also been hosted in Tehran. In 2014, the city hosted the FILA Wrestling World Cup event at the Azadi Indoor Stadium.

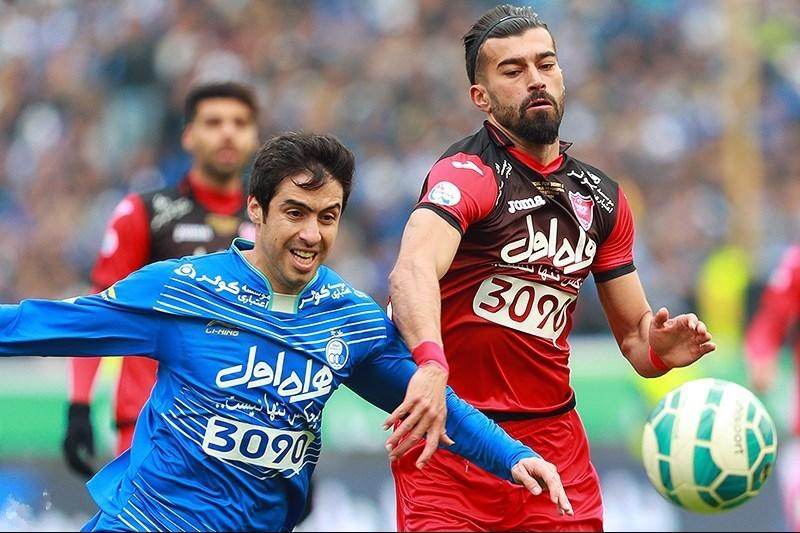
Tehran derby in Azadi Stadium. The match is considered one of the world's most intense derbies.

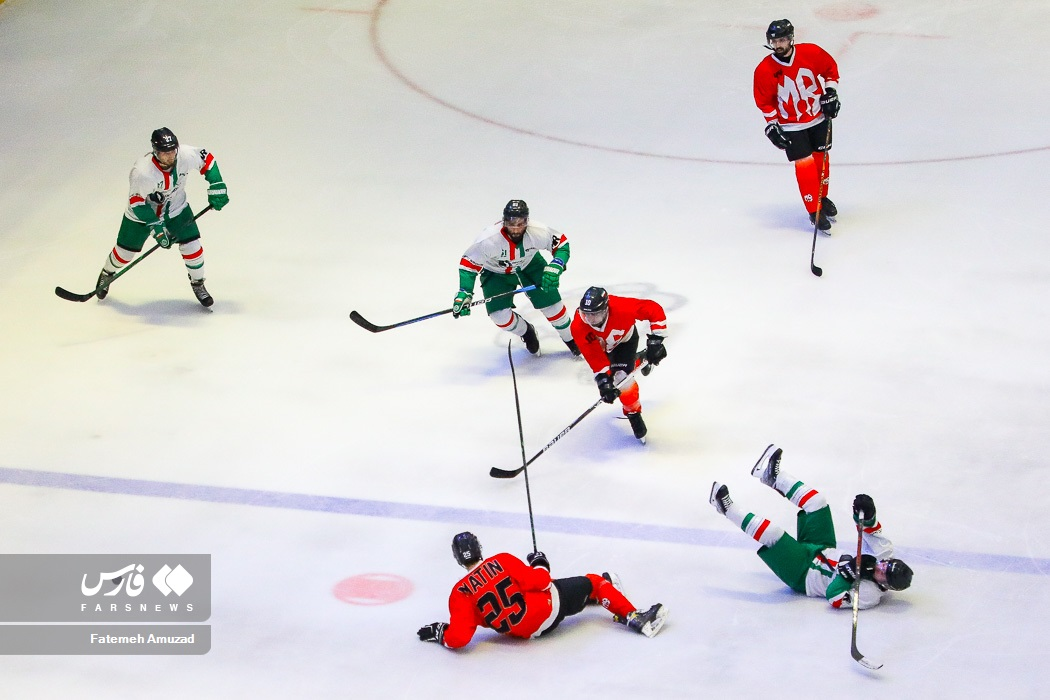
Iran's ice hockey league in Tehran

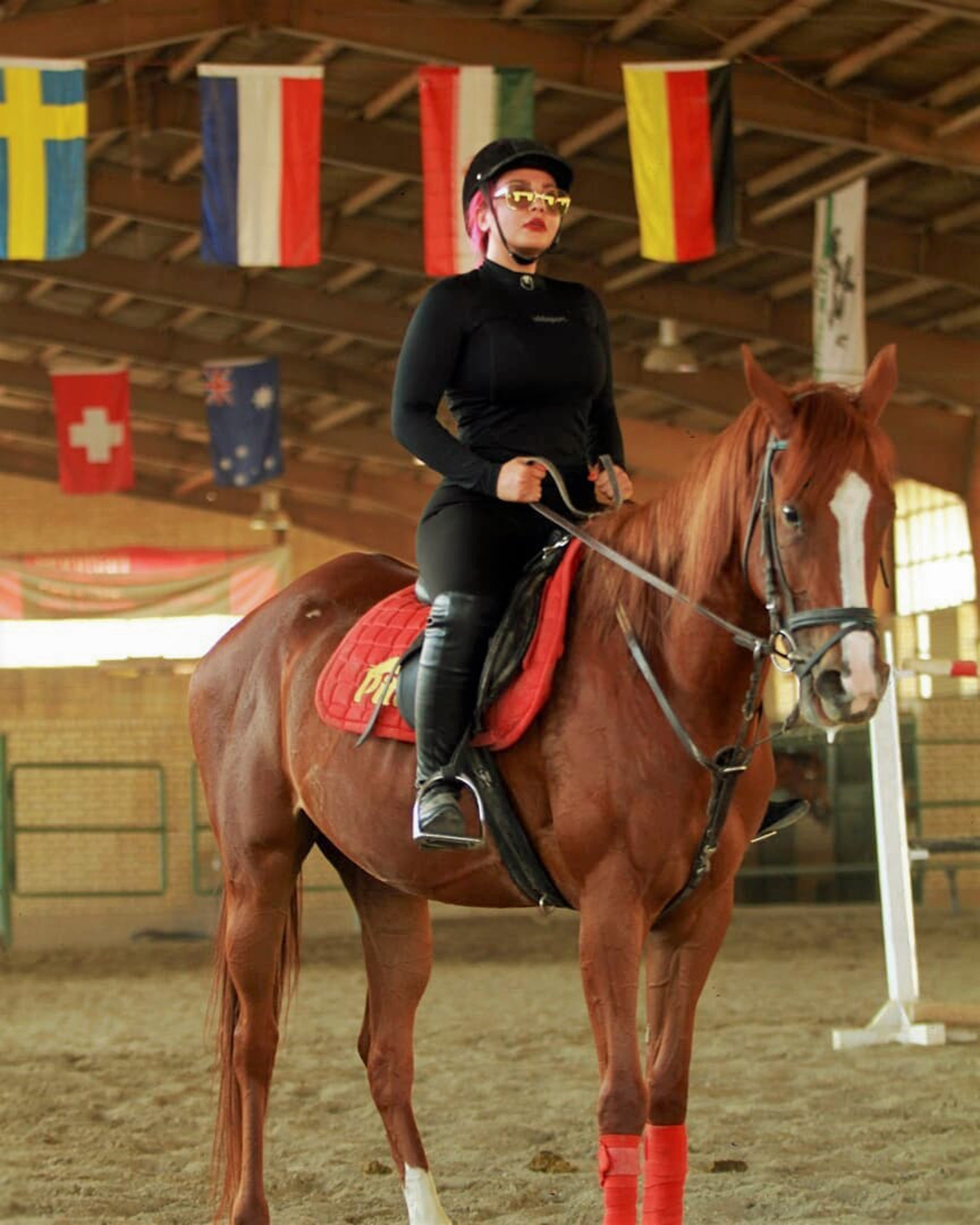
Horse riding in the west of the city

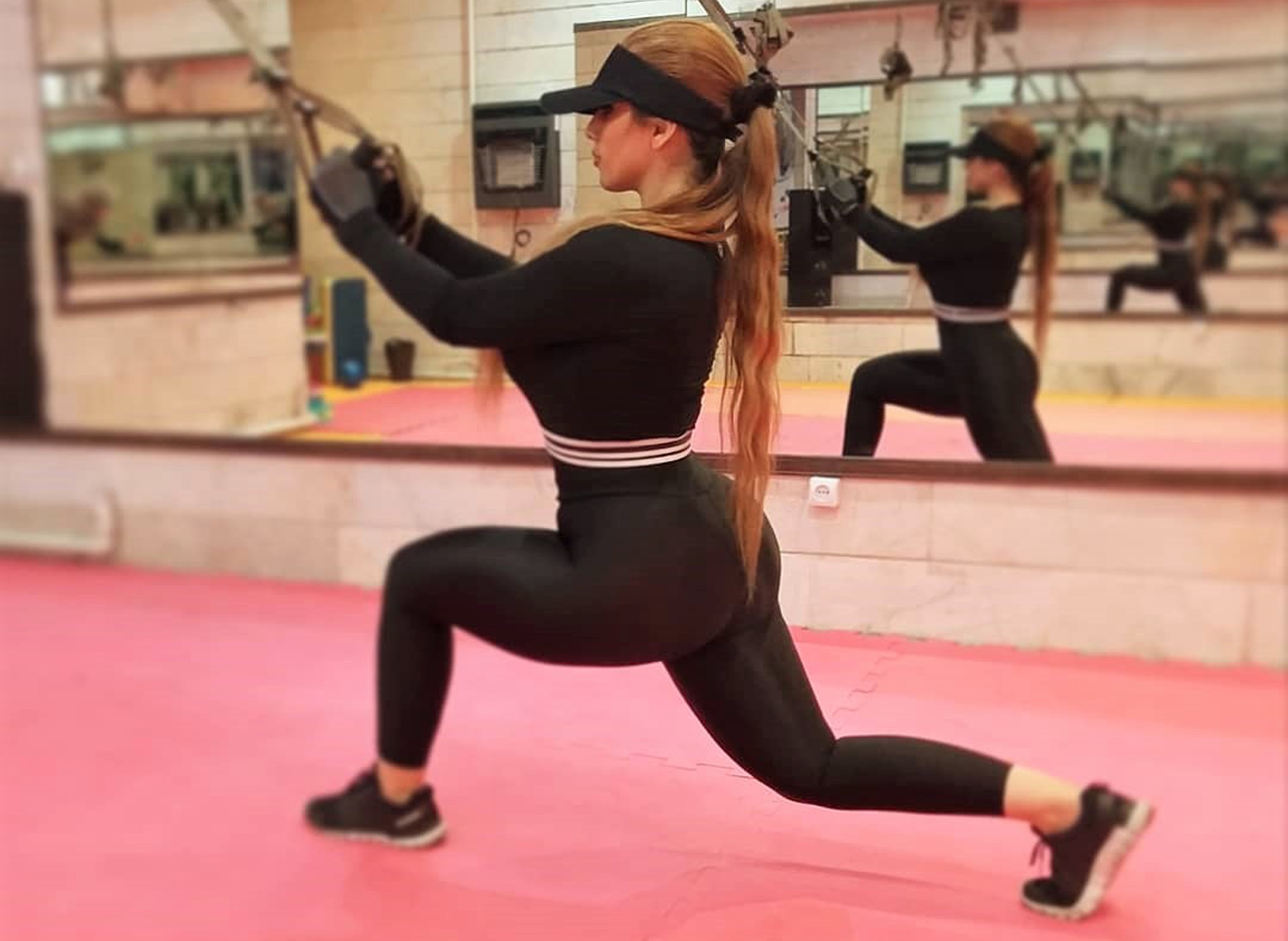
One of the health clubs in the city

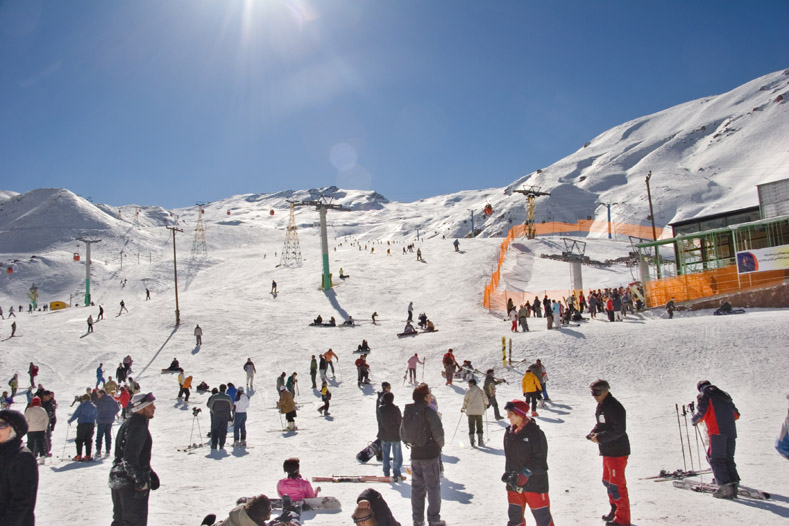
Dizin, Iran's largest ski resort, is located near Tehran.

=== Food ===
There are many restaurants and cafes in Tehran, both modern and classic, serving both Iranian and cosmopolitan cuisine. Pizzerias, sandwich bars, and kebab shops make up the majority of food shops in Tehran.

=== Graffiti ===
Many styles of graffiti are seen in Tehran. Some are political and revolutionary slogans painted by governmental organizations, and some are works of art by ordinary citizens, representing their views on both social and political issues. However, unsanctioned street art is forbidden in Iran, and such works are usually short-lived. During the 2009 Iranian presidential election protests, many graffiti works were created by people supporting the Green Movement. They were removed from the walls by the paramilitary Basij forces. In recent years, the Tehran Municipality has been using graffiti in order to beautify the city. Several graffiti festivals have also taken place in Tehran, including the one organized by the Tehran University of Art in October 2014.

== Twin towns – sister cities ==
Tehran is twinned with:

- Ankara, Turkey
- Baghdad, Iraq
- Beijing, China
- Bishkek, Kyrgyzstan
- Brasília, Brazil
- Budapest, Hungary
- Caracas, Venezuela
- East Jerusalem, Palestine
- Havana, Cuba
- Khartoum, Sudan
- London, England, United Kingdom
- Los Angeles, United States
- Manila, Philippines
- Minsk, Belarus
- Moscow, Russia
- Pretoria, South Africa
- Sanaa, Yemen
- Sarajevo, Bosnia and Herzegovina
- (Georgia (country)) Tbilisi, Georgia
- Yerevan, Armenia
- Seoul, South Korea

== See also ==
- Iran International Exhibitions Company
- Islamic City Council of Tehran
- List of people from Tehran
- Tehran City Council (1968–1979)
- Tehran water shortage

== Bibliography ==
- Emerson, Charles. 1913: In Search of the World Before the Great War (2013) compares Tehran to 20 major world cities; pp. 309–24.

Preceded by Shiraz	Capital of Iran (Persia); 1795–current	Incumbent
