= Tehrani, Fars =

Tehrani تهراني
- Village
- Location within Iran
- Coordinates: 29°01′49″N 54°38′50″E
- Country: Iran
- Province: Fars
- County: Neyriz
- Bakhsh: Central
- Rural District: Horgan

Population (2006)
  - Total: 64
- Time zone: UTC+3:30 (IRST)
  - Summer (DST): UTC+4:30 (IRDT)

Tehrani (Persian: تهراني, also Romanized as Tehrānī) is a village in Horgan Rural District, in the Central District of Neyriz County, Fars province, Iran. At the 2006 census, its population was 64, in 15 families.
