= Kamraniyeh, Tehran =

Neighborhood in Tehran province, Iran

Kamraniyeh کامرانیه
- Neighborhood
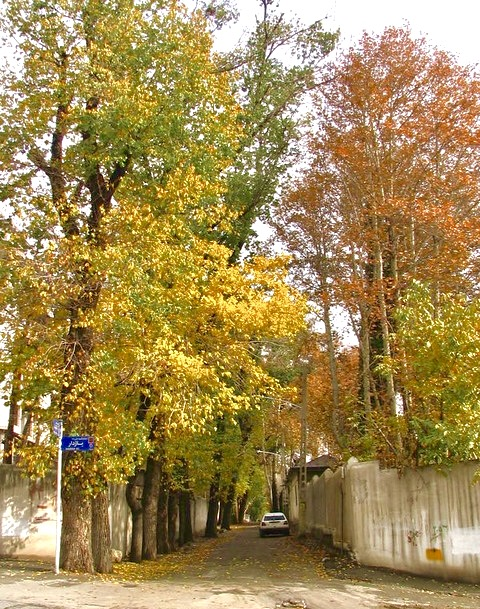
- The neighborhood of Kamraniyeh in fall
- Interactive map of Kamraniyeh
- Coordinates: 35°48′05″N 51°27′40″E
- Country: Iran
- Province: Tehran
- County: Shemiranat
- District: Rudbar-e Qasran
- Rural District: Rudbar-e Qasran
- Time zone: UTC+03:30 (IRST)

Kamraniyeh (Persian: كامرانيه) (Note: Also romanized as Kamranieh, Kāmrānīeh, and Kāmrānīyeh) is an affluent and luxury neighborhood located in one of the northernmost parts of Greater Tehran in the area called Shemiran, on the slopes of Alborz mountain range. Kamraniyeh is known for its luxurious high-rise buildings, costly apartments and massive mansions. Centered on Kamraniyeh Street, the neighborhood lies within Shemiranat County and district one of Tehran municipality.

Along with Farmanieh, Niavaran, Zafaraniyeh and Elahieh, it is now home to the most expensive real estate in Tehran. It is also the home to many Iranian nobles and notables as well as embassies and foreign officials.

The name of Kamraniyeh is based on the son of Naser-al-din Shah, Kamran Mirza Nayeb es-Saltaneh, who used to own much of the land in the area. Kamraniyeh was one of the first neighborhoods in Tehran that was equipped with a telephone system.

In addition, the first pet hospital of Iran, Tehran Pet hospital, was established in this neighborhood in 2004.

== History ==
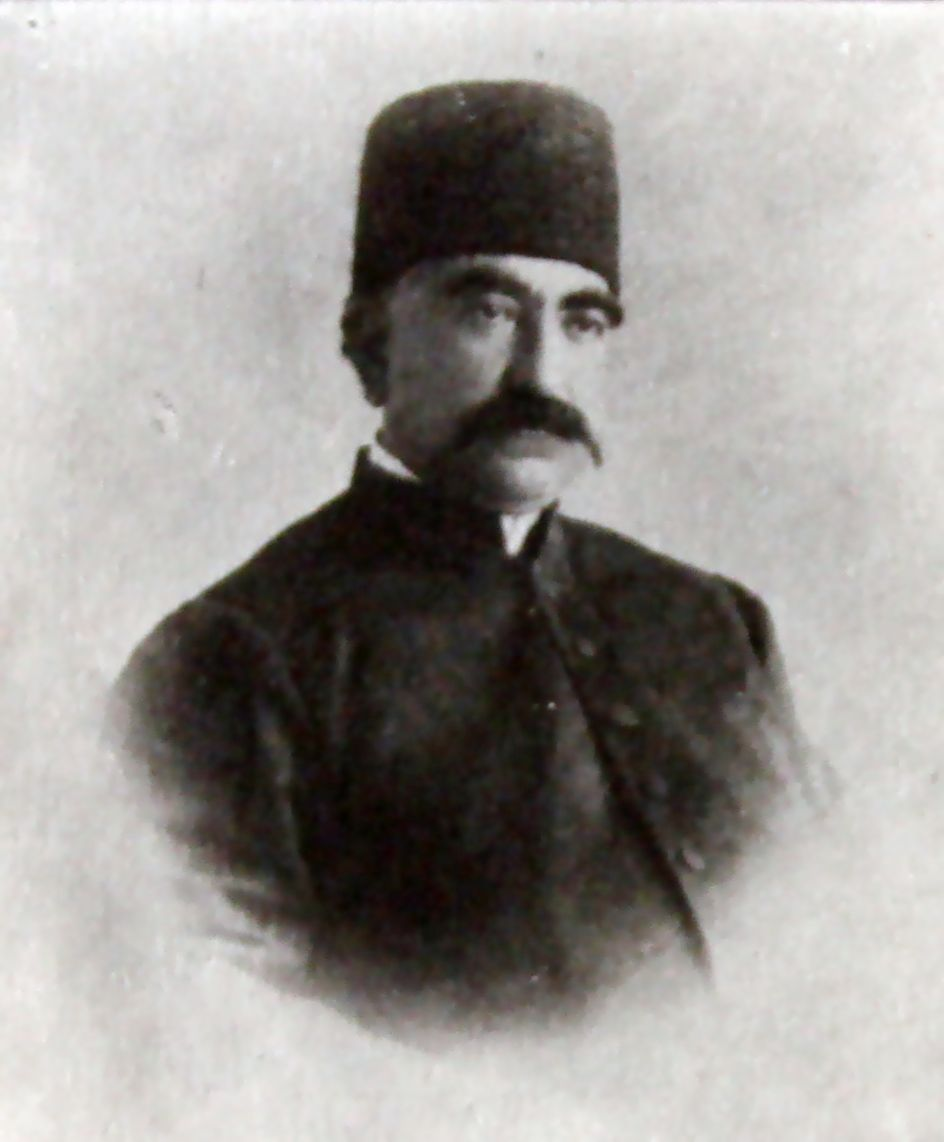
Kamran Mirza Nayeb es-Saltaneh, the former owner of Kamraniyeh estates

In the late 1800s, Kamran Mirza Nayeb es-Saltaneh, the eldest son of Naser al-Din Shah Qajar, grabbed the lands of Kamraniyeh from the locals who used to farm in the area. Afterwards, he ordered to build a fabulous garden instead of the farmlands and then named it Kamraniyeh which means the estate belongs to Kamran. Kamraniyeh garden featured a large variety of plants and a greenhouse to protect sensitive flowers inside it in winter. In audition, two Austrian gardeners were hired to protect the garden all the time.

After Kamran Mirza's death in 1929, his children gradually sold the lands of Kamraniyeh garden to wealthy residents of Tehran. The new owners built themselves villas in order to use them as summer houses. Today however most of the gardens have been replaced by residential towers and newbuild apartments, few of them have actually escaped development.

== Location ==
Kamraniyeh touches Niavaran on the north, Sadr Expressway on the south and Farmanieh on the east and west. Kamraniyeh has two segments named South Kamraniyeh and North Kamraniyeh. South Kamraniyeh is below Kamraniyeh junction and North Kamraniyeh is located upon the junction. Kamraniyeh junction is the point where Kamraniyeh Street, Farmaniyeh Street and Andarzgu Boulevard join each other.

== Weather ==
Kamraniyeh lies on the slopes of Alborz Mountains and enjoys a suitable mild climate.

== Notable Sights ==
- Organisation for Economic Co-operation and Development
- Tehran Pet Hospital
- Embassy of Venezuela in Tehran
- Embassy of Libya in Tehran
- Embassy of Slovenia in Tehran
- The residence of Czech Republic in Tehran

== Notable residents ==
- The private residence of Kamran Diba, designer of Tehran Museum of Contemporary Art (TMOCA), is also in Kamraniyeh. Same as TMOCA, its architecture is similar to Yazd windcatchers (badgir).
- Shahpour Bakhtiar, the last Prime Minister of Iran under the Mohammad Reza Shah Pahlavi

== Gallery ==
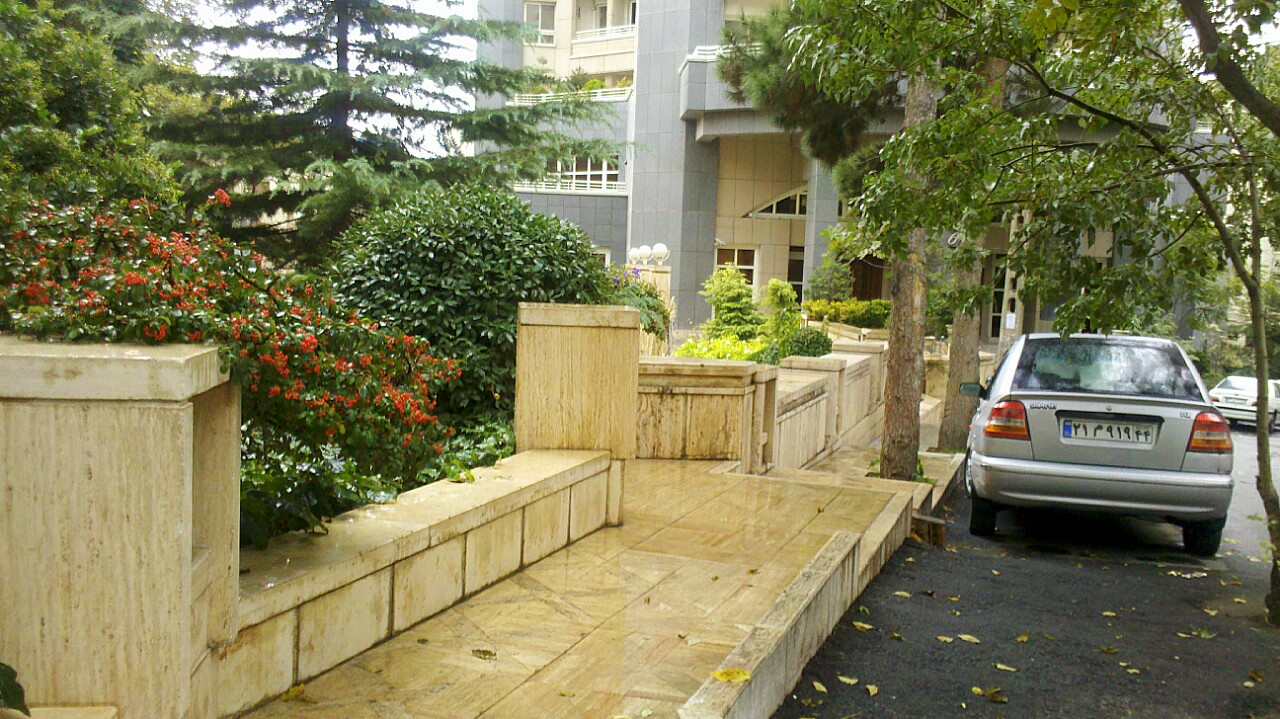

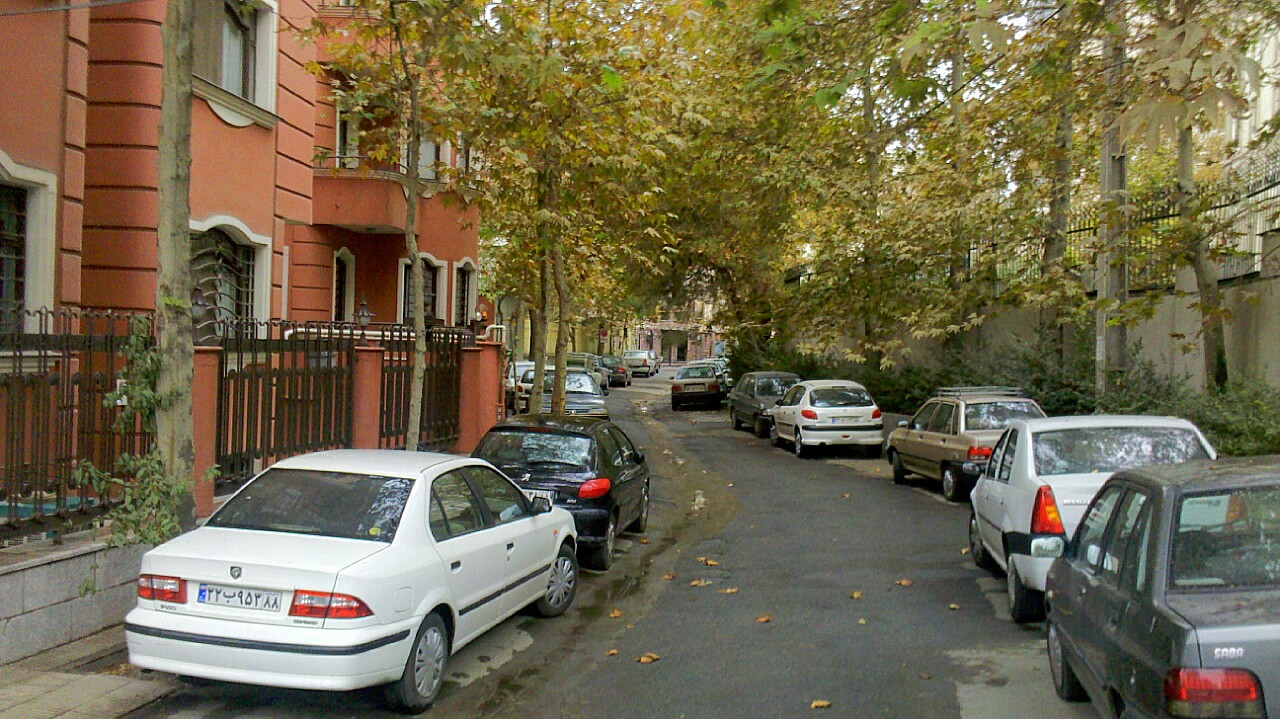

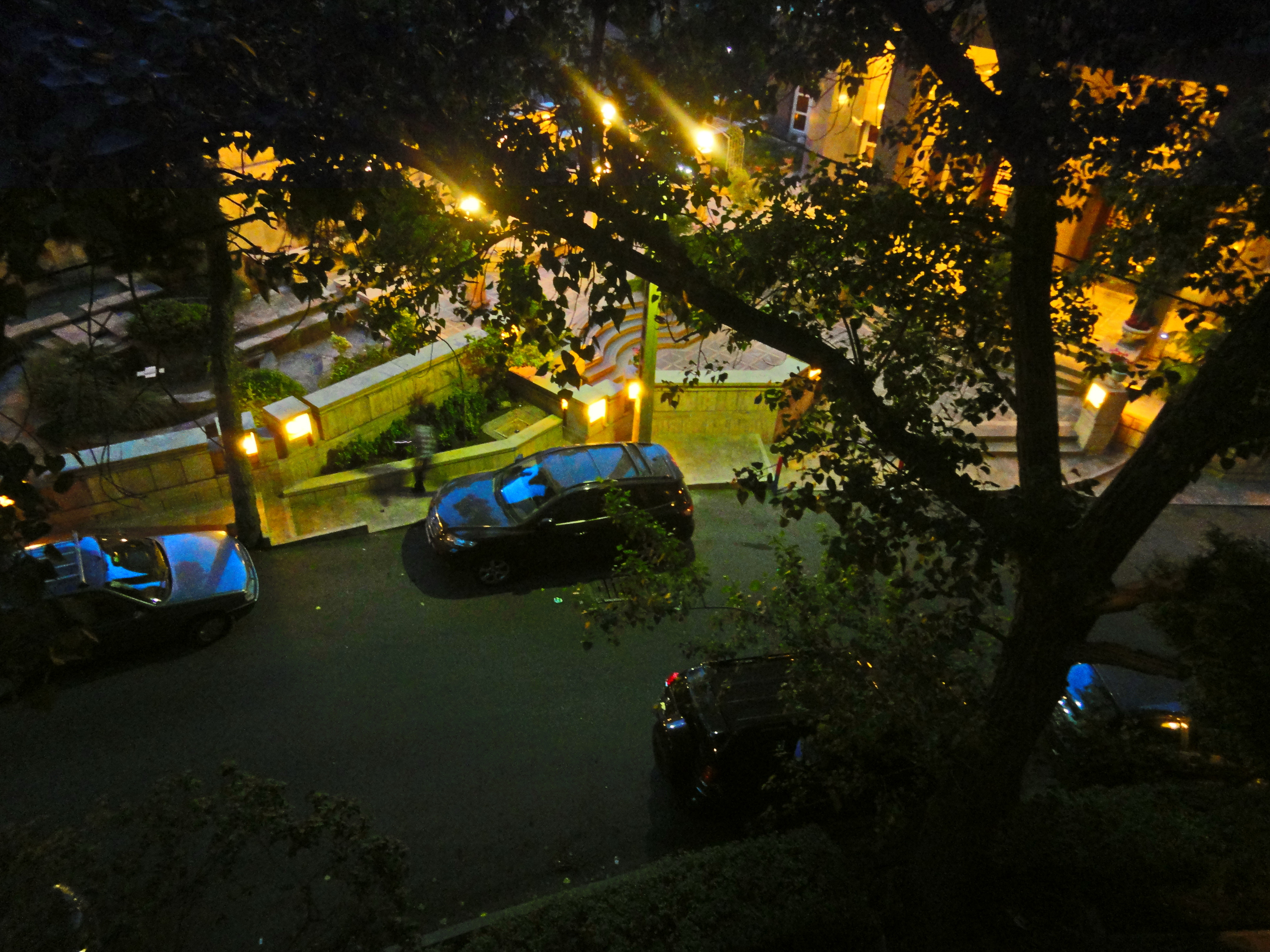

== See also ==
- Farmanieh
- Niavaran
- Shemiran
