= Tajrish Metro Station =

Station of the Tehran Metro

Tajrish ایستگاه مترو تجریش Istgah-e Metro-ye Tajrish
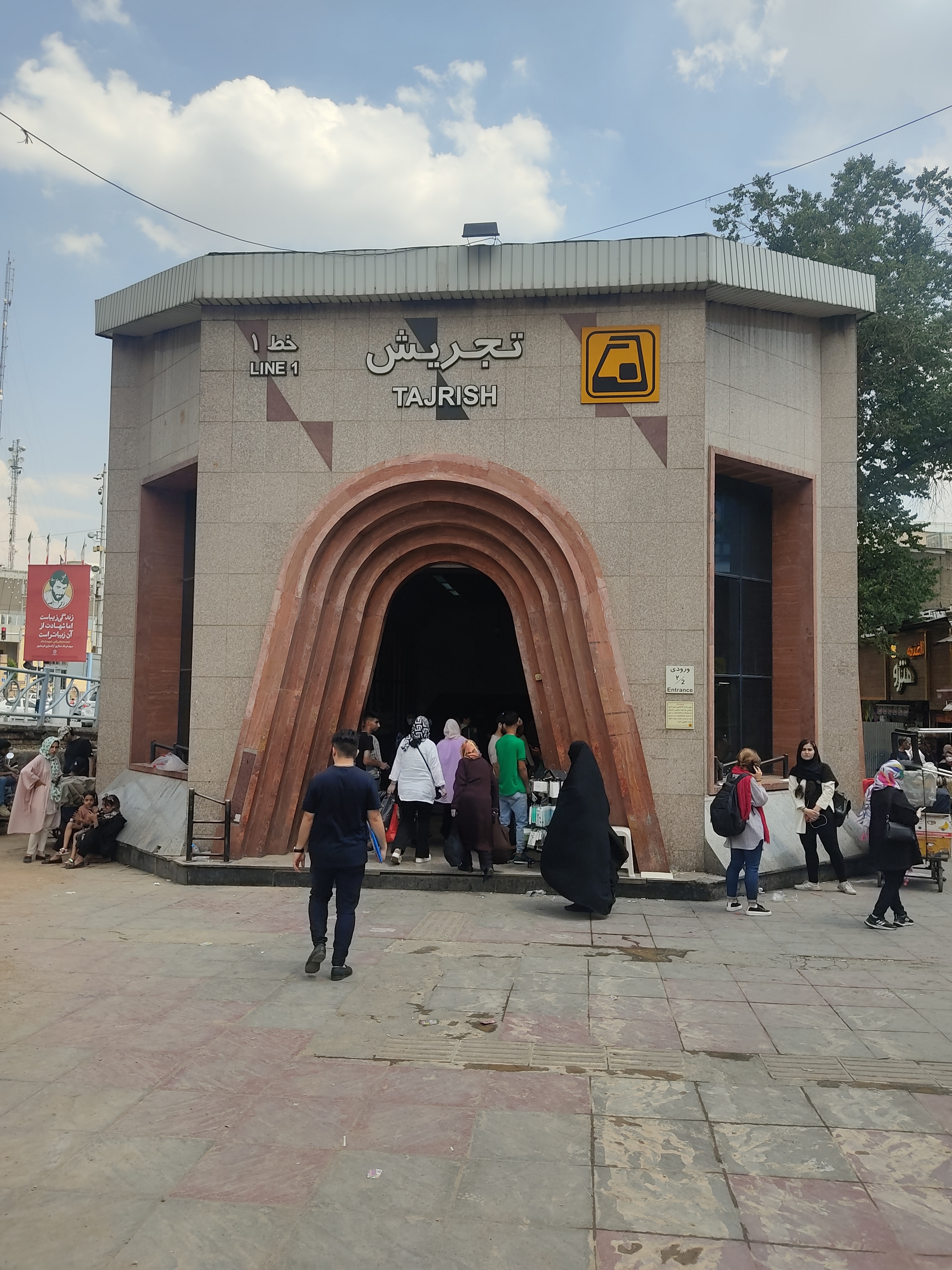

General information
- Location: Shariati Street - Shahrdari Street; District 1, Tehran, Shemiranat; Tehran Province, Iran
- Coordinates: 35°48′15.77″N 51°26′2.22″E
- System: Tehran Metro Station
- Platforms: 2 Side Platforms
- Tracks: 2
- Connections: Tehran BRT: BRT 7 · 107 Rahahan-Tajrish; Tehran Buses: 216 Tajrish Term.-Jamaran; 220 Saba Blvd.-Ozgol Sq.; 225 Dastvareh Term.-Qods Sq.; 298 Tajrish Term.-Shahrak-e Qa'em; 300 Tajrish Term.-Oshan Term.; 303 Pich-e Shemiran-Qods Sq.; 357 Emam Khomeini Metro-Qods Sq.; 387 Qods Sq.-Resalat Sq.

Construction
- Structure type: Underground
- Depth: 167 feet (51 m)
- Parking: Yes
- Cycle facilities: Yes
- Accessible: yes

History
- Opened: 30 Bahman 1390 H Kh (19 February 2012)

Services
Preceding station	Tehran Metro	Following station
Terminus	Line 1	Gheytariyeh towards Kahrizak
Location

Tajrish Metro Station is the northern terminus station of Tehran Metro Line 1. It is located at the intersection of Shariati Street with Bahonar and Shahrdari streets at Qods Square. This station was opened on 19 February 2012 and has an indoor area of 1,200 square meters. The station is the access point to Niavaran, Darband and Elahieh streets as well as Tajrish Square.

== Facilities ==
This station has escalators, a lost and found office, metro police, taxi and bus terminals.

== Bus lines ==
The following bus lines which lead to and pass near this station include:

- Line 218: Darakeh to Jamaran on the route of Darakeh Street, Rashiduddin Fazlollah Boulevard, Moghaddas Ardebili Street, Valiasr Street, Tajrish Square, Shahrdari Street, Qods Square, Dezashib, Bahonar Street (Niavaran) and Jamaran Street.
- Line 220: Ozgol Square to Tajrish Square on the route of Ozgol Street, Niruye Zamini Blvd., Mini City, Artesh Blvd., Movahed Danesh Street (Aghdasiyeh), Pasdaran Street, Lavasani Street (Farmanieh), Bahonar Street (Niavaran), Qods Square, Shahrdari Street and Tajrish Bridge.
- Line 225: Qods Square to Shahid Dastvareh (Masoumi) Terminal on the route of Shariati Street, Shahid Kolahduz Street (Dolat), Ekhtariyeh Square, Pasdaran Street and Nobaniad Square.
- Line 298: Ghaem Town to Tajrish Square, along Ghaem Town Street, Artesh Boulevard, Oshan Boulevard, Darabad, Pourabtehaj Street (Darabad), Bahonar Street (Niavaran), Qods Square, Shahrdari Street, and Tajrish Bridge.
- Line 303: Qods Square to Shemiran Turnoff on the route of Shariati Street, Sadr Bridge, Shariati Street, Seyed Khandan Bridge, Sohravardi, Motahari and Malek Streets and Shariati Street to Shemiran Turnoff.
- Line 387: Qods Square to Resalat Square on the route of Shariati Street, Sadr Bridge, Sadr Highway, Imam Ali Highway, Lavizan, Shamsabad, Imam Ali and Resalat Highways..

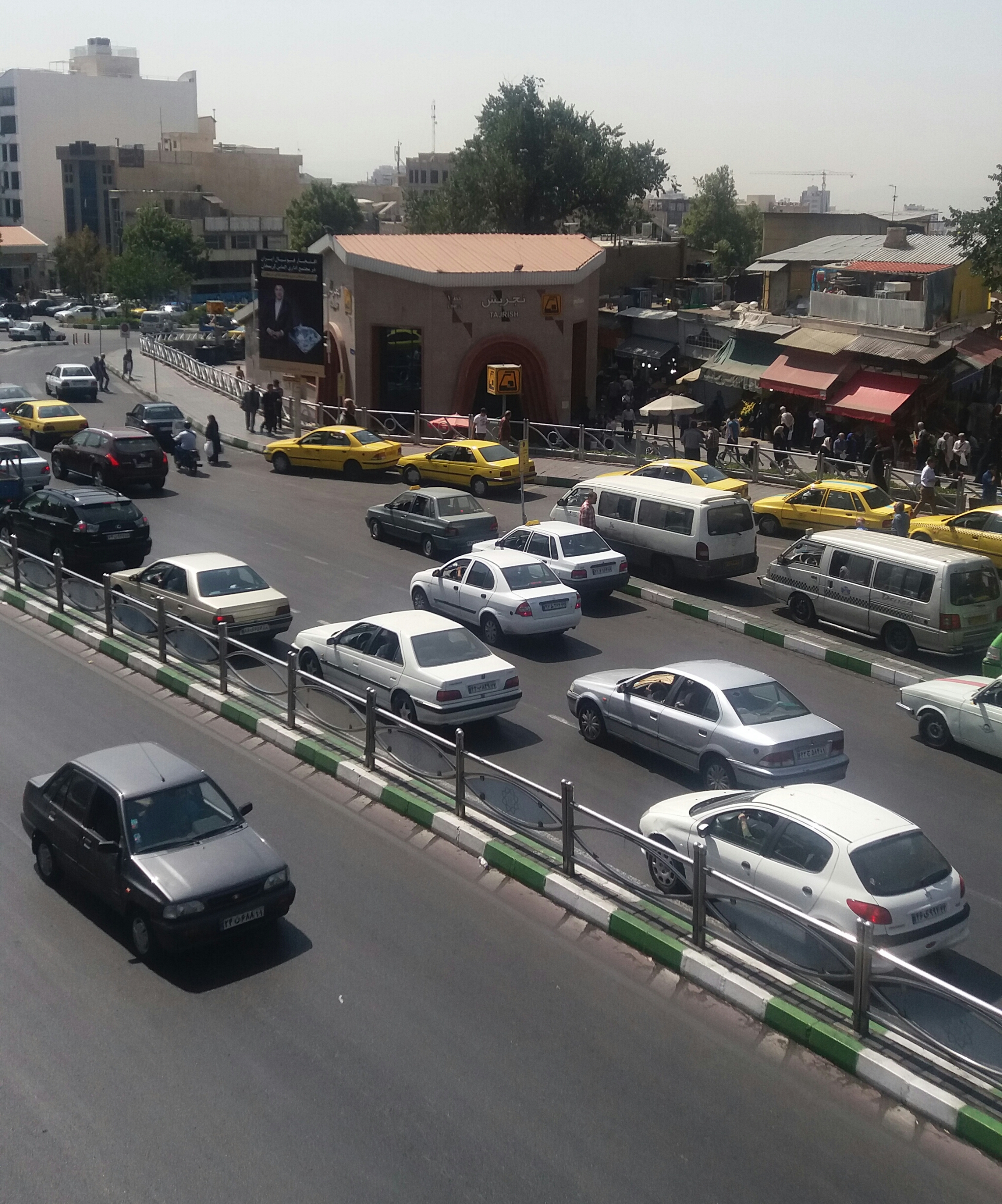
View of the entrance to Tajrish Metro Station, 2016
