= Gheytariyeh Metro Station =

Station of the Tehran Metro

Gheytarieh ایستگاه مترو قیطریه
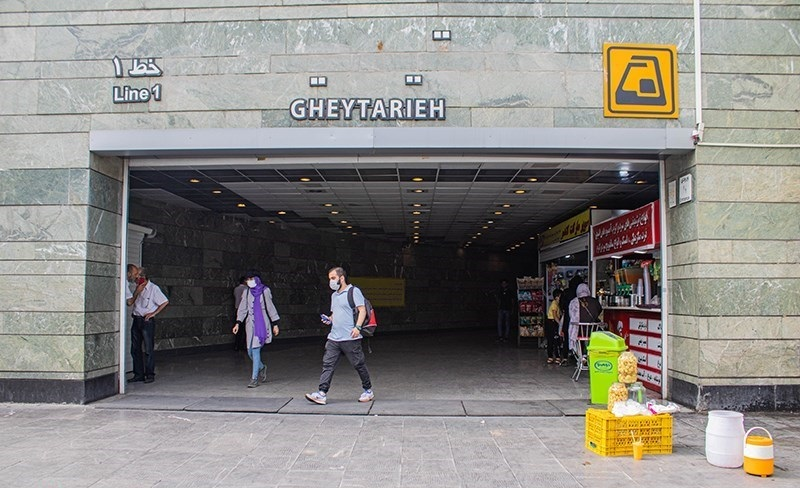

General information
- Location: Shariati Street- Gheytarieh Boulevard; District 1, Tehran, Shemiranat; Tehran Province, Iran
- Coordinates: 35°47′35″N 51°26′07″E
- System: Tehran Metro Station
- Operator: Tehran Urban and Suburban Railways Organization (Metro)
- Connections: Tehran Buses: 220 Saba Blvd.-Ozgol Sq.; 225 Dastvareh Term.-Qods Sq.; 303 Pich-e Shemiran-Qods Sq.; 357 Emam Khomeini Metro-Qods Sq.; 387 Qods Sq.-Resalat Sq.; Tehran Taxis: Gheytariyeh Metro Station to Chizar Square; Gheytariyeh Metro Station to Aghdasieh; Darabad to Ajoudanieh; Gheytariyeh Metro Station to Nobonyad Metro Station

Construction
- Structure type: Underground

History
- Opened: February 10, 2010

Services
Preceding station	Tehran Metro	Following station
Tajrish Terminus	Line 1	Shahid Sadr towards Kahrizak
Location

Gheytariyeh Metro Station is a station of Tehran Metro Line 1. The station is located on Shariati Street, opposite Pol-e-Rumi The covered area of this station is more than 3,531 square meters and its open space is over 787 square meters.

This station is located on Line 1 of the Tehran Metro between Tajrish Metro Station in the north and Shahid Sadr Metro Station in the south.

This station is located in Shemiranat County, northeast of Tehran.

== Nearby places ==
This station is located in the vicinity of Elahiyeh, Gheytarieh, Farmanieh, Chizar, Dezashib and Pol-e-Roomi neighborhoods, Andarzgoo, Saba and Kaveh boulevards, Fereshteh, Karimi, Khazar, Pashazohri and Soheyl streets. Other important places include:

- Gheytarieh Park
- Sana Commercial Complex
- Dr. Hesabi Museum
- Simin and Jalal Museum
- Ezzat-o-llah Entezami Museum
- Mellal Cultural Center
- Amir Kabir statue
- Nima Yooshij Museum

Nearby diplomatic places include:

- Embassy of Finland
- Embassy of Germany
- Embassy of Turkey
- Embassy of Iraq
- Embassy of the Holy See
- Embassy of Italy
- Embassy of the Netherlands
- Embassy of Turkmenistan
- Embassy of South Korea
- Embassy of Switzerland
- Embassy of Belgium

== Entrances ==
This station has two entrances, north and south. The north entrance is located next to Saba Boulevard and Shariati Street and leads to the bus and taxi terminal. The south entrance faces Pol-e-Roomi and has fewer steps to exit, and there is enough space in front of it to park bicycles and motorcycles.
