= Mahmoodieh =

Mahmoudyeh (Persian: محمودیه), also spelled Mahmoodieh or Mahmoodiyeh is a residential area in Tehran, located south of Zaferaniyeh, bordering Valiasr Avenue on the east side, Velenjak on the west, and Chamran expressway to the south. The area is close to Tajrish.

Mahmoodieh was among the first districts of Shemiran to develop into a year-round residential area for affluent classes of the time (1950s). The neighborhood became known for its large residential properties, extensive gardens, and relatively low-density development. Compared with some later luxury districts such as Elahiyeh or Niyavaran, Mahmoodieh's architecture has often been characterized by more restrained exterior designs, with emphasis placed on spacious grounds and landscaped gardens rather than highly ornate facades. As a result, the neighborhood has long been associated with established wealthy families and prominent business figures.

Historically characterized by large villas and garden estates, Mahmoodieh experienced less intensive redevelopment than some other affluent districts of northern Tehran, during the 1990s. In recent decades, however, increasing urban density and rising land values have contributed to the demolition of some older villas and their replacement with multi-storey residential buildings.

The neighborhood is also associated with the Iranian writer Goli Taraghi, who spent part of her childhood in this area. Memories of Shemiran and northern Tehran feature prominently in several of her works.
