= Gheytarieh =

Neighbourhood in Tehran, Iran

Coordinates: 35.79162°N 51.45093°E

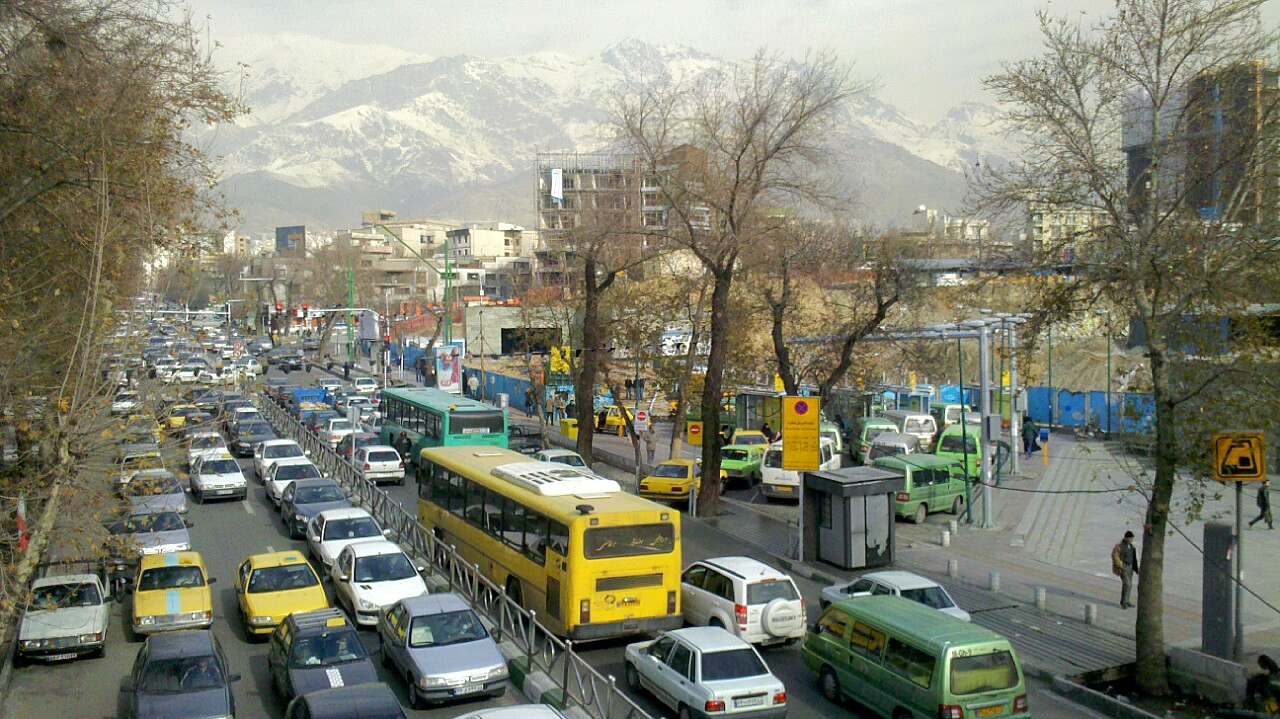
Shariati street lower Qeytarieh intersection.

Qeytarieh (Persian: قیطریه, also spelled Gheytarieh) is a neighbourhood in northern Tehran, located within the larger Shemiran district. Qeytarieh has a park with the same name. It is served by the Gheytariyeh Metro Station.

Qeytarieh's neighbouring districts are Niavaran, Kamranieh, Farmanieh, Elahieh and Tajrish. The reason for the formation of this neighborhood, like most other neighborhoods in Shemiranat, can be considered as agriculture and horticulture. Most of the people who settled the neighborhood came here from the city of Borujerd from the Lorestan province.

== Notable people ==
Morteza Pashaei was a musician that lived in Gheytariyeh.

== Gheytarieh Park ==
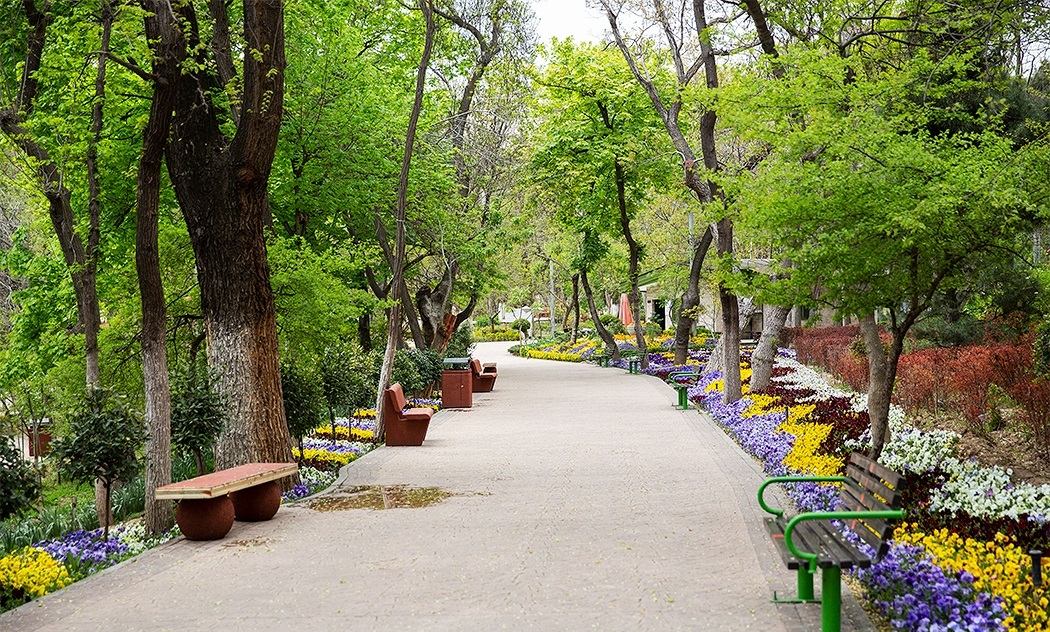
Qeytarieh Park.

Gheytarieh Park is one of the parks located in the northern part of Tehran, situated in the Gheytarieh neighborhood within District Seven of Tehran Municipality's Region 1.

This park is located to the north of Sadr Highway and at the end of Gheytarieh Street. It is bordered to the north by Farmanieh, to the south by Pirouz Square and Sadr Highway, to the east by Chizar, and to the west by Gheytarieh and Shariati Street.

== History ==
=== Background ===
In the past, Gheytarieh Park was a garden owned by the half-sister of Naser al-Din Shah Qajar. According to historical accounts, Amir Kabir, Mirza Taghi Khan, constructed the building that now serves as the cultural center and library of the park, located in the northwest corner of the park.

Initially, this garden had a forest-like texture. In 1977, Tehran's then-mayor, Gholamreza Nikpey, who was the maternal grandson of Prince Zell-e Soltan, a son of Naser al-Din Shah, converted the large Gheytarieh garden into a park. This was achieved by donating a portion of his inherited land, purchasing, and consolidating the remaining parts of the garden owned by the heirs of the Sadiq ol-Dowleh, descendants of the Qajar dynasty, and the son-in-law of Mirza Ali Asghar Atabak, also known as Mirza Ali Asghar Khan Abdar.

This is why Gheytarieh Park has an irregular layout and covers an area of about 103,000 square meters, with its flowerbeds and lawns complementing the dense, old trees, giving it a unique charm.

In 1977, parts of Gheytarieh Garden were handed over to Tehran Municipality by its heirs to be converted into a park. In 1993, the remaining areas of this garden were added to Gheytarieh Park, and the building was renovated and repurposed as the Mellat Cultural Center.

=== Construction of Mosque ===
In 2023, news surfaced about the Tehran Municipality's intention to construct a mosque in Gheytarieh Park. This sparked media controversy and faced widespread opposition. Some claimed the presence of ancient relics at the site was one motivation for the mosque's construction, while others considered the project baseless, given the abundance of mosques in the area.

Eventually, the plan to build the mosque in Gheytarieh Park was halted and abandoned.

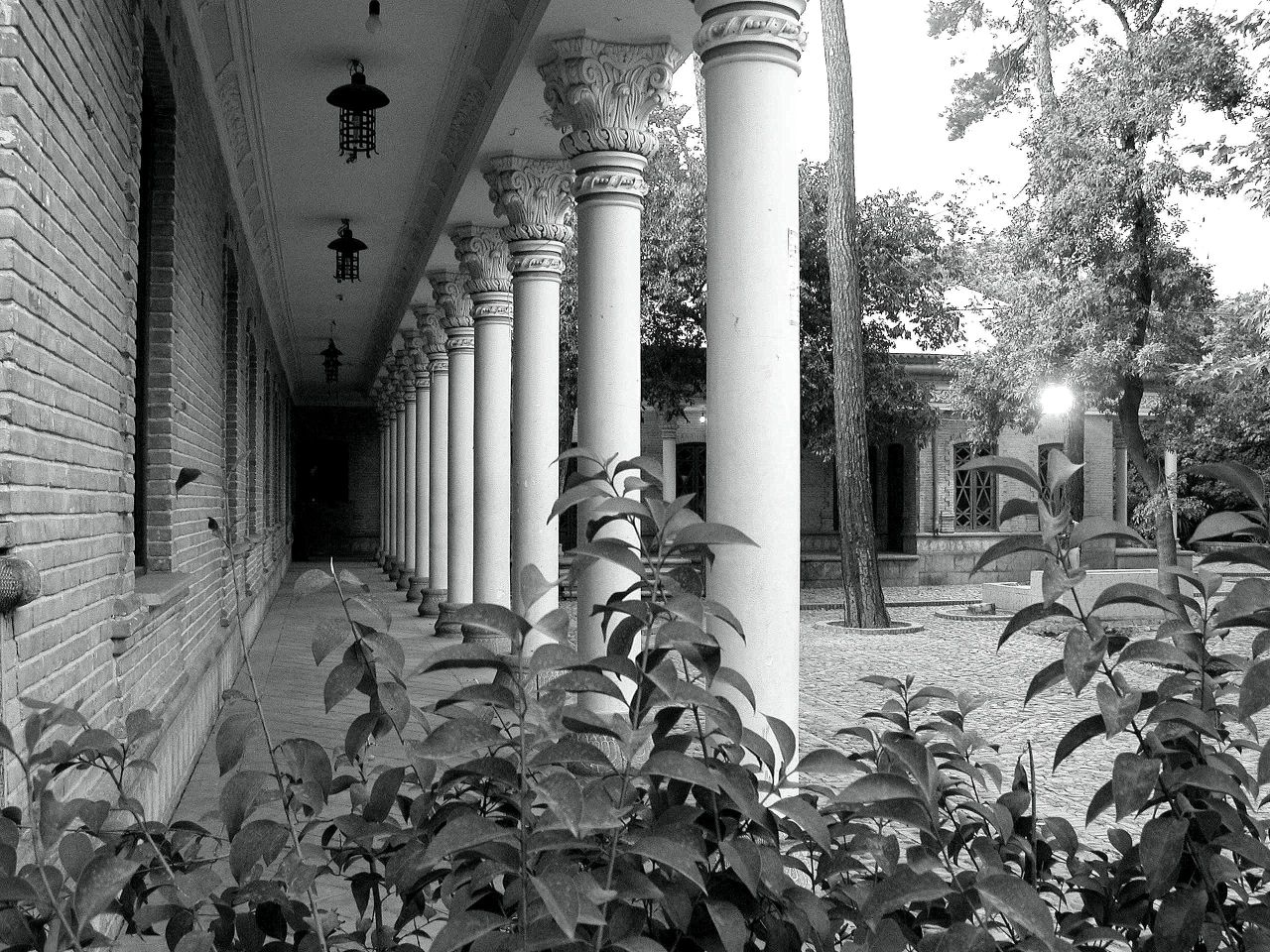
A view of a structure inside the park
