= Shahid Sadr Metro Station =

Station of the Tehran Metro

Sadr ایستگاه مترو صدر
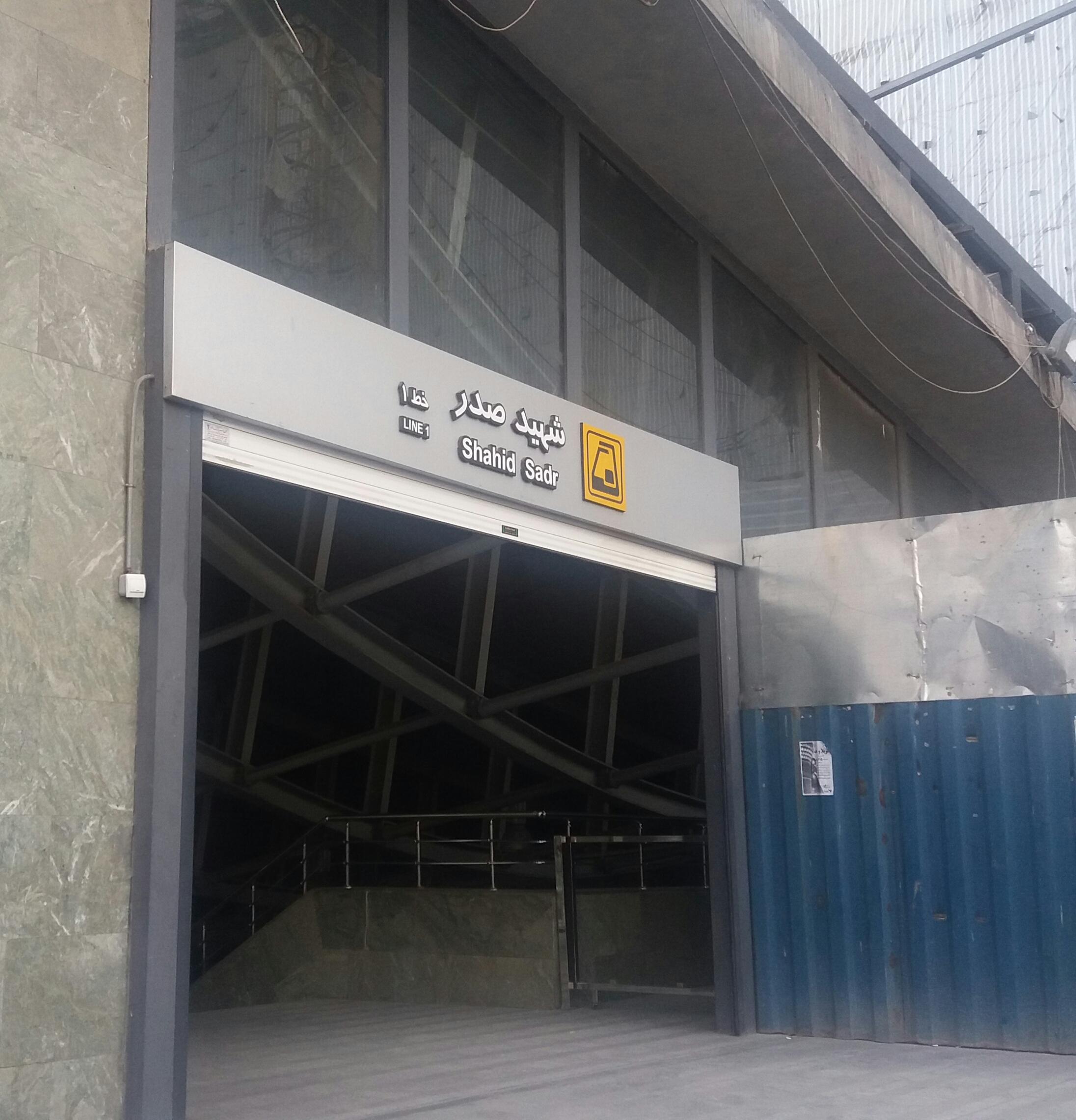

General information
- Location: Shariati Street- Sadr Expressway; District 1, Tehran, Shemiranat; Iran
- Coordinates: 35°47′07″N 51°26′09″E
- Operator: Tehran Urban and Suburban Railways Organization (Metro)
- Connections: Tehran Buses: 225 Dastvareh Term.-Qods Sq.; 303 Pich-e Shemiran-Qods Sq.; 357 Emam Khomeini Metro-Qods Sq.; 387 Qods Sq.-Resalat Sq.

History
- Opened: 1389 H-Kh (2010)

Services
Preceding station	Tehran Metro	Following station
Gheytariyeh towards Tajrish	Line 1	Gholhak towards Kahrizak
Location

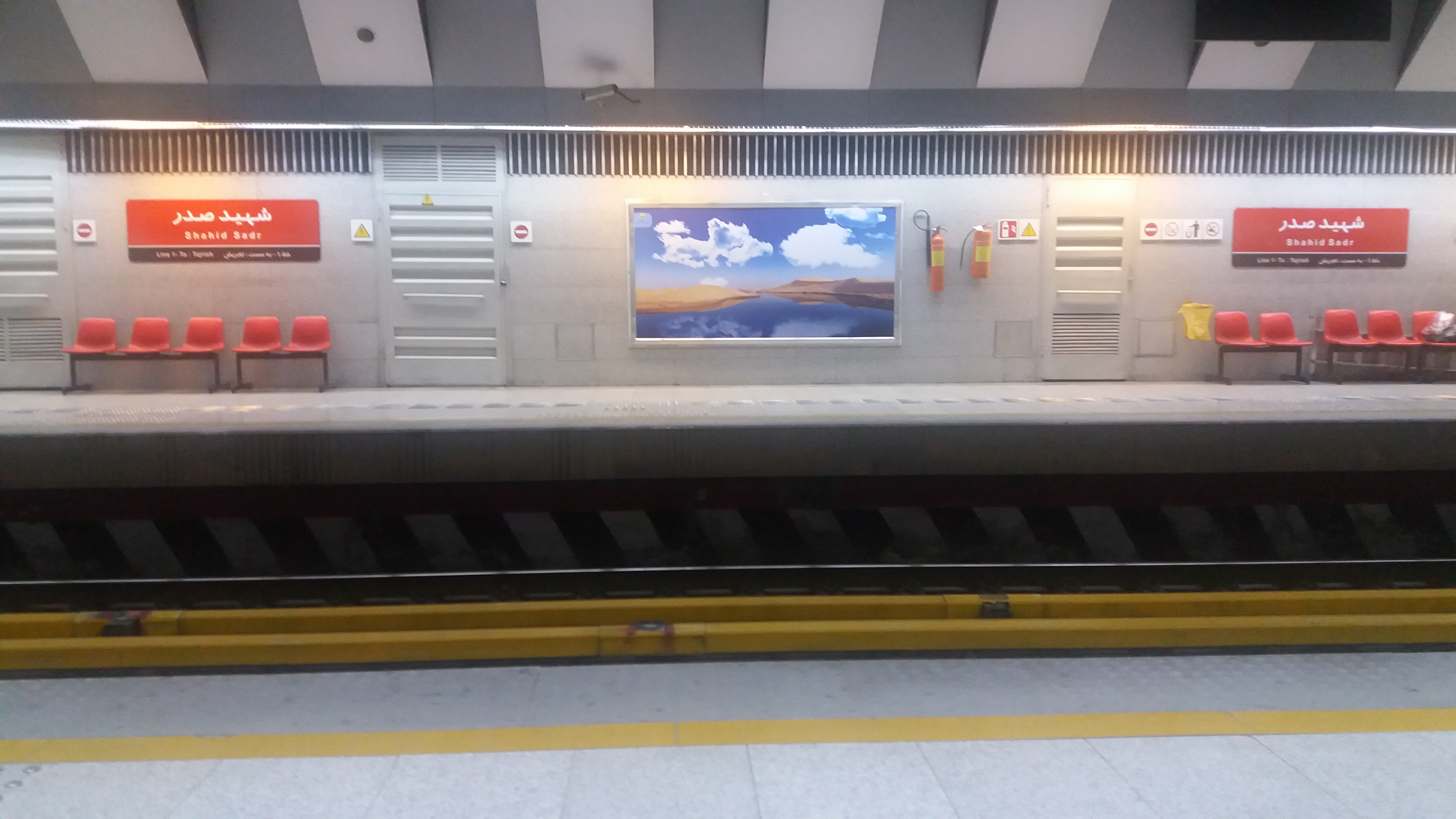

Shahid Sadr Metro Station is a station of Tehran Metro Line 1. It is located at Sadr Expressway and Shariati Street intersection. The neighboring stations are Gholhak and Gheytariyeh.

== Facilities ==
The station has a ticket office, escalators, cash machine, taxi stand, pay phone, water fountains, and a lost and found.
