= Shemiranat =

Shemiranat may refer to:

- Shemiran, a neighbourhood of Tehran, Iran
- Shemiranat County, an administrative division of Tehran Province, Iran
