= Shariati Metro Station =

Station of the Tehran Metro

Doctor Shariati ایستگاه مترو دکتر شریعتی
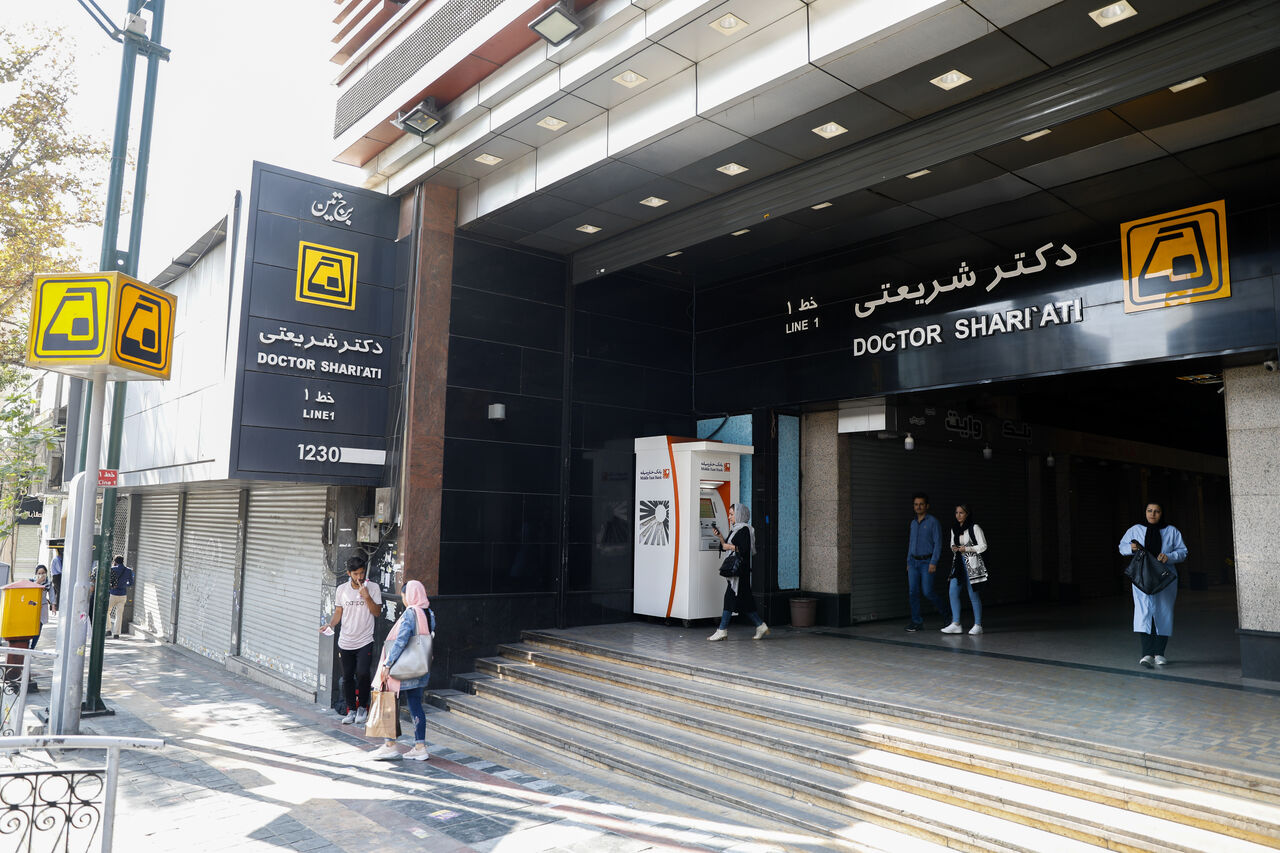

General information
- Location: Shariati Street; District 3, Tehran, Tehran County; Iran
- Coordinates: 35°45′46″N 51°26′40″E
- System: Tehran Metro Station
- Operator: Tehran Urban and Suburban Railways Organization (Metro)
- Connections: Tehran Buses: 303 Pich-e Shemiran-Qods Sq.

History
- Opened: 1388 H-Kh (2009)

Services
Preceding station	Tehran Metro	Following station
Gholhak towards Tajrish	Line 1	Mirdamad towards Kahrizak
Location

Doctor Shariati Metro Station is a station in Tehran Metro Line 1. It is located in Shariati Street. It is between Mirdamad Metro Station and Gholhak Metro Station. It was opened on 19 May 2009.

== Facilities ==
The station has a ticket office, escalators, cash machines, toilets, pay phones, water fountains, and a lost and found.
