= Farmanieh =

Neighbourhood in Tehran, Iran

Coordinates: 35°48′04″N 51°28′05″E

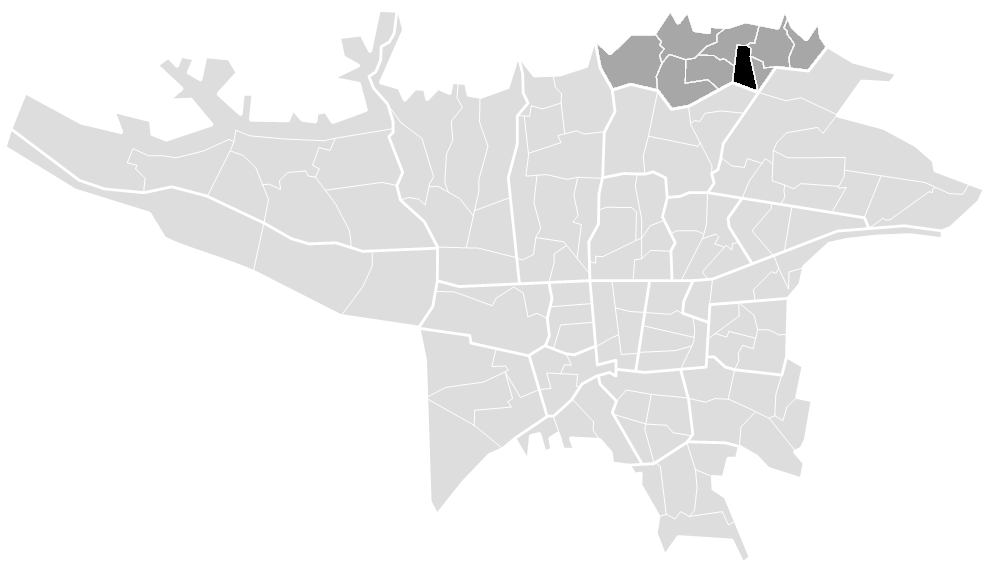
Location of Farmanieh (black) in Municipal District No. 1 (dark grey) of Tehran metropolis

Farmanieh (Persian: فرمانیه), also spelled Farmaniyeh, is a wealthy district located in northern Greater Tehran in the area named Shemiran. This neighborhood, which is located in District 1 of Tehran municipality and Shemiranat city, is known as one of the most expensive residential areas of Tehran.

This area is centered on Farmaniyeh street, bordered by Niavaran to the north, Pasdaran and Aqdasiyeh streets to the east, Dezashib to the west, and Sadr highway in one part and Chizer and Anderzgo boulevard in the other part. Farmaniye Street (Dr. Lavasani) is the main street of the region, which starts from Farmaniyeh intersection in the east and reaches Kamraniyeh intersection and Anderzgo Boulevard in the west. Then, with a twist, it moves to the northwest from the Kamraniyeh intersection and finally leads to the Ammar highway at the intersection of Dezashib St. near Tajrish Square. Kamraniye neighborhood, in the middle of Farmaniye region, divided it into two eastern and western parts.

In the past, the Farmanieh region belonged to the Farmanfarmaian family, an influential and wealthy family during the Qajar era, and the name of Farmanieh is also derived from the name of this family. In this area, there are many embassies, including the Italian embassy and garden; For this reason, a considerable number of foreign nationals reside in Farmaniye region. Also, many of the richest people in Iran live in this area.

== History ==
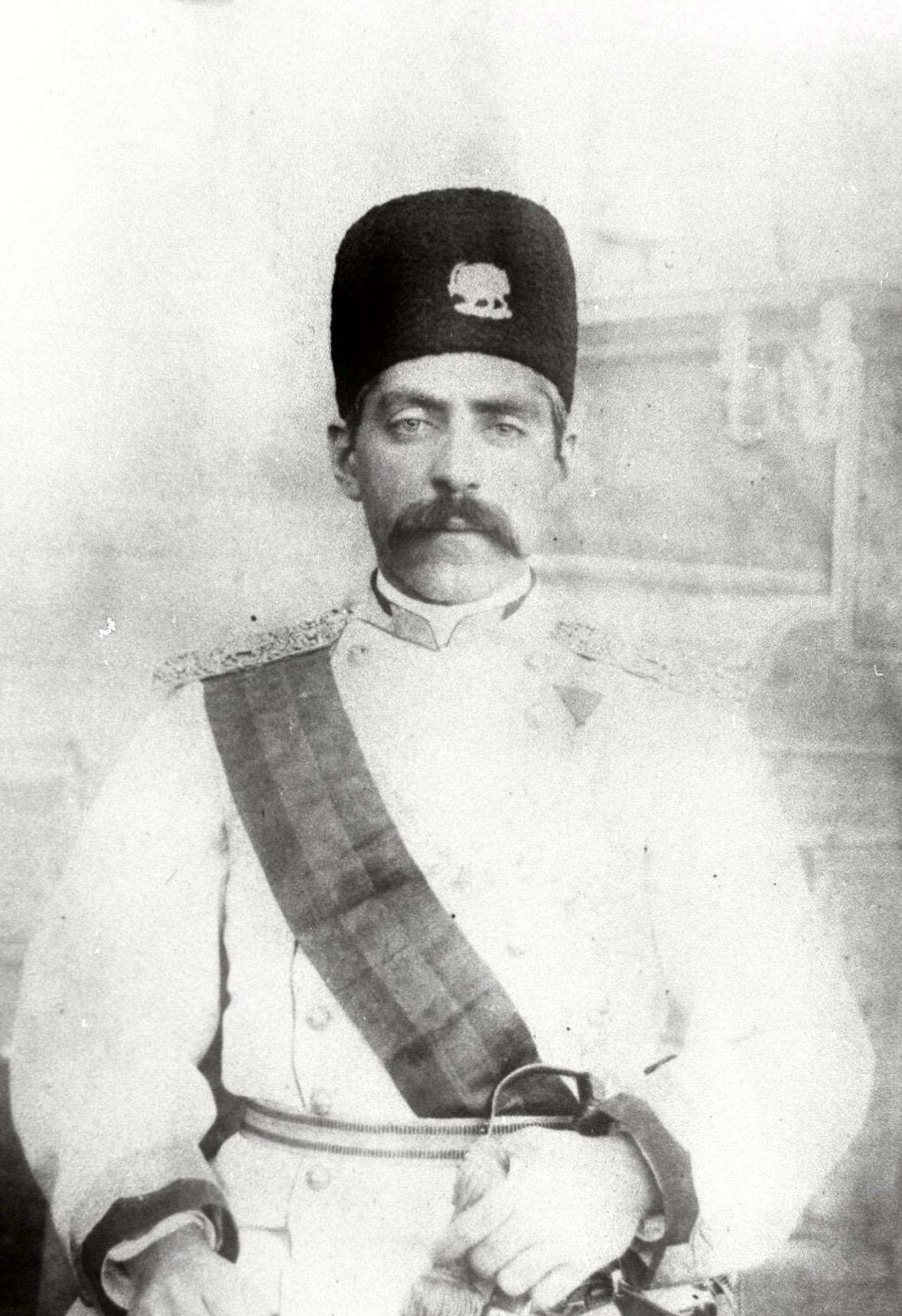
Abdol-Hossein Farman Farma in 1896

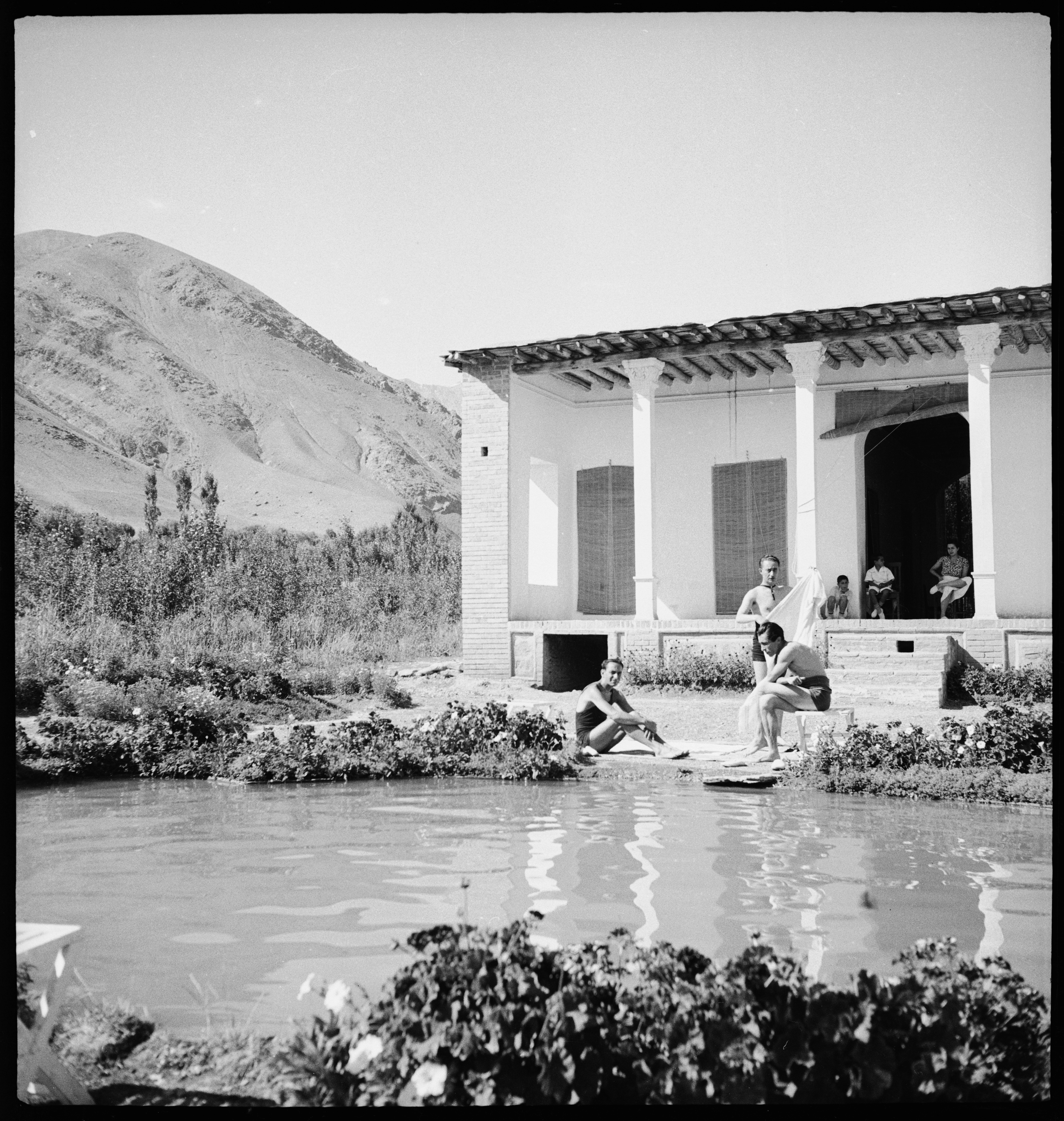
Farmanieh district in 1930s by Annemarie Schwarzenbach

Farmanieh lands belonged to Abdol-Hossein Farman Farma, the prime minister of Iran in the last years of the Qajar dynasty. He had bought these lands in 1326 lunar year (1288 solar year) from Mohammad Wali Khan Asif al-Sultaneh. Farmanfarma had many wives and dozens of children, so that the children of his first wife would not be jealous of other children, during his lifetime, he distributed a large part of his property among the children of his first wife. Among this property went to Firoz Firoz, his eldest son. Firouz, who was known for his extravagance, was forced to sell part of his property to the Italian embassy.

== Notable Sights ==
=== Embassies ===
- Italian embassy and garden
- Dutch embassy
- Norwegian embassy
- Swedish embassy
- Czech embassy
- Turkmen embassy
- Pietro Della Valle Italian School

=== Other sites ===
- Famanieh Club
- Farmanieh Hospital
- Farmanieh Pardis Complex
- Shemiranat City Road and Urban Development Department
- Islamic Republic of Iran Shipping Line Group
- Ports and Maritime Organization of the Islamic Republic of Iran
- Shemiranat Red Crescent
- Mellat Bank Club

== Climate ==
Due to the location of the Italian embassy and other gardens left by Shemiran in this area, as well as the proximity of Niavaran Park and Niavaran Palace, this area has a cool and clean climate like other areas in the north of the city.
