= Masoud Lavasani =

masoud lavasani مسعود لواسانی
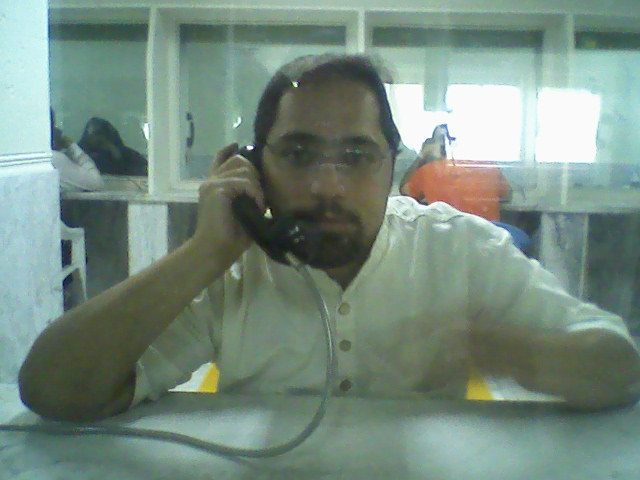
- Lavasani in Evin prison in 2010
- Born: August 1, 1979 (age 46); Tehran, Iran
- Occupations: Blogger and Journalist

Masoud Lavasani (Persian: مسعود لواسانی), (born 1979) is an Iranian journalist and blogger. Lavasani was the culture editor of the newspaper Aftab Yazd in Tehran and has also worked for Shargh, Hamshahri and Etemad as well as the Mehr News Agency.

Masoud Lavasani was arrested on June 30, 2009, following the disputed 2009 Iranian Presidential election. He was charged with "Engaging in propaganda activities against the regime". Judge Pir Abassi in the Revolutionary Court sentenced him to eight and a half years in prison. He was also issued a lifelong ban from journalism. In the Appeals Court Massoud Lavasani's sentence was reduced to six years in prison and a ten-year ban from journalism.

== Career ==
Nevertheless, among cultural circles and the publishing industry, Masoud Lavasani is a familiar name. Book publishers remember him from his vigorous reports and interviews before and during the 2007 Tehran book fair, when he challenged the fair management over its policies and stubbornness to choose Mossalla, as the fair venue. When he was denied entry to the fair as a result of his reporting, he did not hesitate to leap over the fences at night and take pictures of clogged pipes and damaged books for the Mehr News agency. The pictures clearly proved that Tehran's Mossalla was not the proper venue for the fair. Finally, because of his book fair coverage, as well as his other reports, he was fired from the Mehr News, where he worked.

Masoud Lavasani was arrested and taken to Evin on September 26, 2009. During his detention in solitary he endured harsh psychological torture and pressure. He became weak and sick inside the bitter cold and filthy cell. These days he is being held in the basement of ward, where prisoners are watched day and night with closed-captioned cameras, constantly mistreated and taken to the prison yard every morning at 7am to do their mandatory exercises in cold temperatures.

== In His Biography ==
LAVASANI started working with the Iranian press at the end of 90’s. He worked for Jam e Jam newspaper in Tehran, in addition, wrote short stories in the Mini Mall. He wrote cultural reports, Movie’s Reviews, Book Reviews in newspapers such as Hamshahri (Tehran), Etemad (Tehran), Ketab e Hafteh weekly.
From February 2004 until September 11, 2007, he worked for the MEHR news agency as a reporter in the culture and literature. After that, he worked for the Aftab Yazd newspaper until end of December of 2007. He worked in couple of Weekly magazines and monthly one’s under the title of the secretary and editor of the magazines. Until September of 2009 he worked as a freelance journalist for various newspapers.
Now, he is analyzing the cultural issues, and reports on censorship of books, newspapers, media pressure against journalists. At this point he is working specifically on the subject of tolerance, its impact on the community, education, coping strategies, tolerance. His studies are about the issues of Iran and Afghanistan, the Middle East and Turkey have largely dominated the news and tolerance in these countries. He is trying, through news, reports, analysis of events due to lack of tolerance levels of family, community and the world, that the consequences of intolerance, family quarrels, tribal, national and international.

== Arrest and Imprisonment ==
November 29, 2009, judge Pir-Abassi of the 26th branch of the Revolutionary Court handed down an 8-year prison sentence to Lavasani. His charges included conspiracy and acting against national security, insulting the Supreme Leader, disseminating lies through his weblog and emails and so on and so forth. Currently his weblog, the box of ants' memoirs, has been deleted by the interrogators and is not accessible.

Lavasani had originally been sentenced to an 8 1/2-year imprisonment during his initial trial. The sentencing was delivered to Mr. Lavasani on April 15, 2009. Masoud Lavasani received a six-year jail sentence combined with a ban from engaging in any press-related activities for a period of 10 years. Lavasani's general condition is quite precarious and, in spite of an agreement for his conditional release on a 500,000 USD bond, which was very difficult to arrange, Intelligence and judicial officials are still blocking his release. Mr. Lavasani is denied the right to visit his two-year-old child as well as his wife and parents. Mr. Lavasani is being held under tough conditions in the basement section 350 of Evin Prison.

Javad Moghimi, Lavasani in conversations with friends about the Guardian he said:

He says his close friend Masoud Lavasani, a political correspondent for Fars News, is in prison on hunger strike.

== Hunger Strike ==
Lavasani's hunger strike is to protest the limitations placed by prison guards at Evin prison. News media reported that: Also, Masoud Lavasani's bad physical condition due to pressure at Evin prison as well as harsh interrogations has caused the concern of his family and those close to the journalist.

- Detained Masoud Lavasani Still in Evin Clinic

Lavasani's wife Fatemeh Kheradmand has written a note referring to the first occasions she had seen Lavasani's tears and his injured body due to tortures, and added that she knows Maous Lavasanis is being hospitalized in Evin clinic

- The media wrote :

According to the latest reports, Lavasani, a detained journalist, has had a nervous breakdown in prison. 07/05/2010 GVF—Advarnews has reported that after more than nine months of imprisonment, journalist Masoud Lavasani has been released from prison for a short leave.
