= Gholhak Metro Station =

Station of the Tehran Metro

Gholhak ایستگاه مترو قلهک
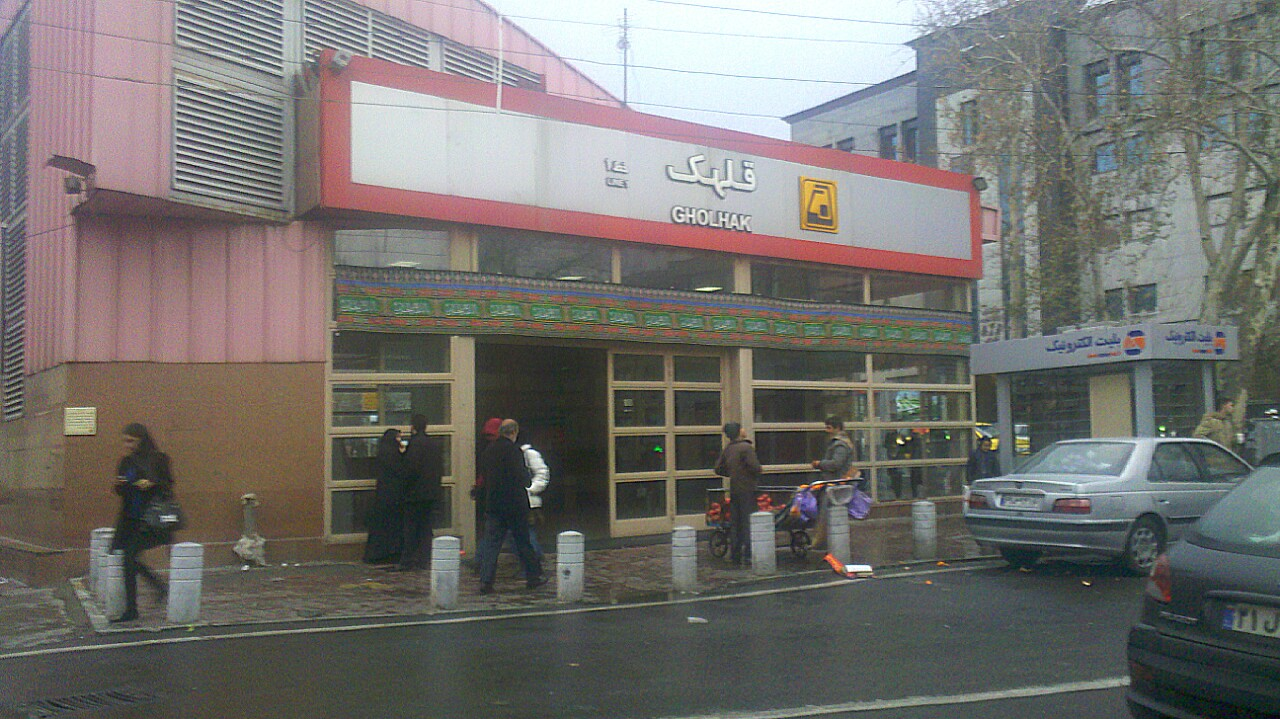

General information
- Location: Shariati Street, Gholhak; District 3, Tehran, Tehran County; Iran
- Coordinates: 35°46′22″N 51°26′17″E
- System: Tehran Metro Station
- Operator: Tehran Urban and Suburban Railways Organization (Metro)
- Connections: Tehran Buses: 303 Pich-e Shemiran-Qods Sq.

History
- Opened: 1388 H-Kh (2009)

Services
Preceding station	Tehran Metro	Following station
Shahid Sadr towards Tajrish	Line 1	Shariati towards Kahrizak
Location

Gholhak Metro Station is a station of Tehran Metro Line 1. It is located in Shariati Street in Gholhak neighborhood. The neighboring stations are Shariati and Shahid Sadr. It was opened on 19 May 2009.

== Facilities ==
The station has a ticket office, escalators, cash machines, bus routes, pay phones, water fountains, and a lost and found.
