= Iranian Art Museum Garden =

Museum in Tehran, Iran

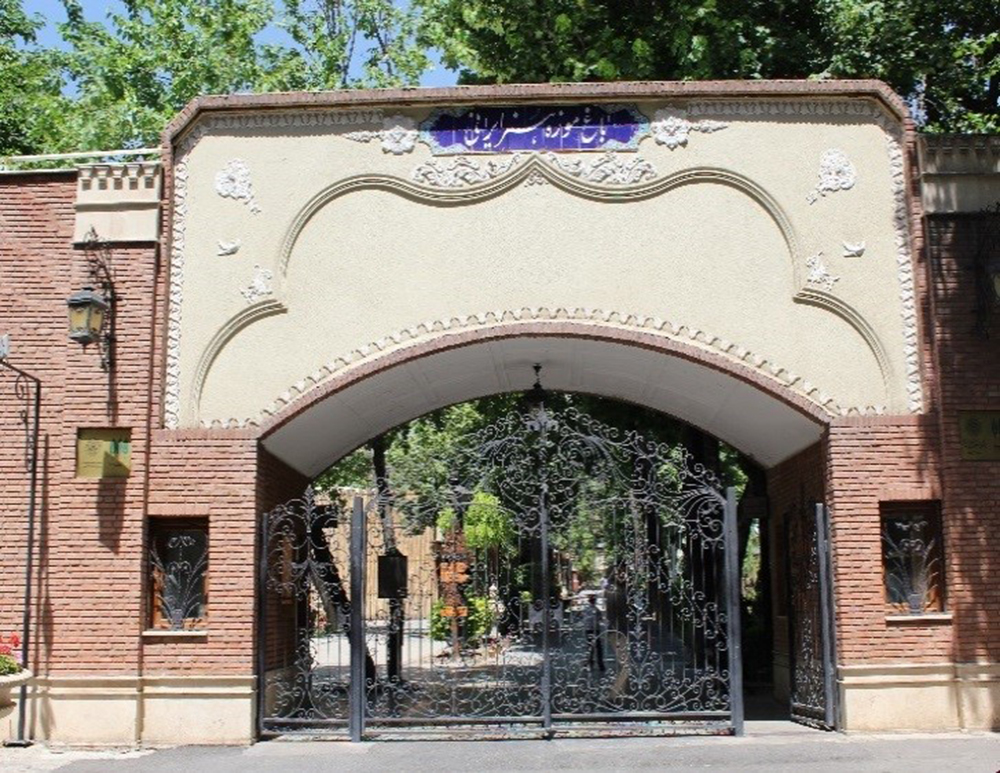
- The main entrance gate of the museum

- Location within Tehran
- Location: Tehran, Iran
- Coordinates: 35°47′56″N 51°25′28″E
- Type: Art museum
- Website: baghehonar.farhangsara.ir

The Iranian Art Museum Garden (Persian: باغ‌موزه هنر ایرانی) is an art museum located in the Elahieh district of Tehran. The gardens have an area of less than one hectare. The main attraction of the museum gardens are about a dozen scaled-down replicas of well-known historical Iranian buildings dating to the early Pahlavi era.

== History ==
The main building was built in 1931 and belonged to Ahmad Amir Ahmadi, the lieutenant general of Reza Shah, and then to his wife, Turan Mohajer Eslami. Its repair was started in 2005 with green space and landscaping, and it was opened as a museum that year.

== Models of Iranian historical buildings ==
During the Pahlavi era in the 1960s, for the festival named the "2,500-year celebration of the Persian Empire", models of some of the most famous historical Iranian buildings were ordered from Italian artisans. The models were constructed of concrete, with resin and polyester used to decorate their windows. Oil paints were used for painting the models of the Hasht Behesht, Chehel Sotoun and Shams-ol-Emareh buildings.

These models of Iranian historical monuments further include Hasht Behesht, Chehel Sotoun, Gonbad-e Ghabus, Shams-ol-Emareh, Si-o-se-pol bridge of Isfahan, Mahyar Caravansary, Fin garden of Kashan, Azadi tower, Milad tower, Tomb of Danial, Soltanieh Dome, and St. Thaddeus Monastery.

== Arts Exhibition ==
The museum garden has included a painting exhibit, movies department, arts workshop, cultural products store, and an exhibit of Iranian sculptors' works.

Some of these models in the garden were repaired by experts from the Iranian Cultural Heritage Organization in 2006.

== Gallery ==
Iranian Art Museum Garden
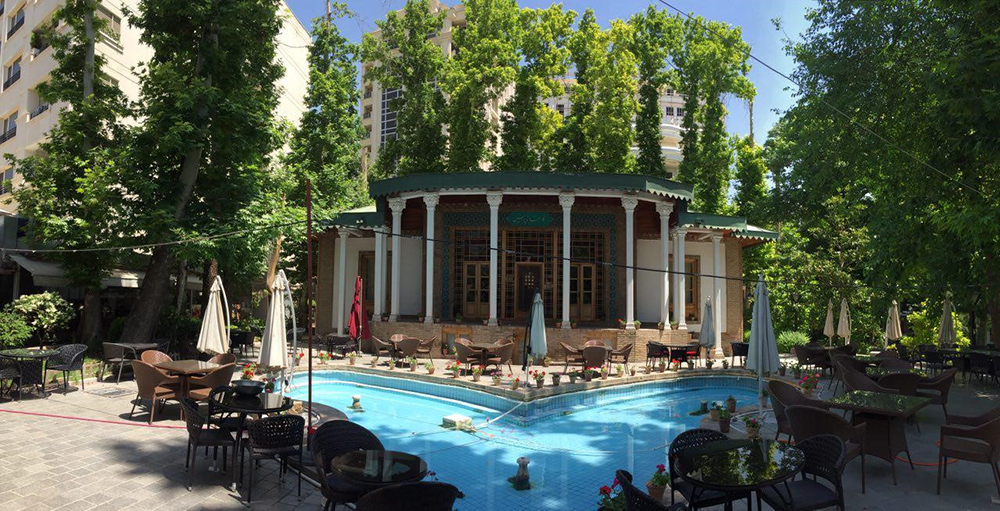
Main Building of Museum

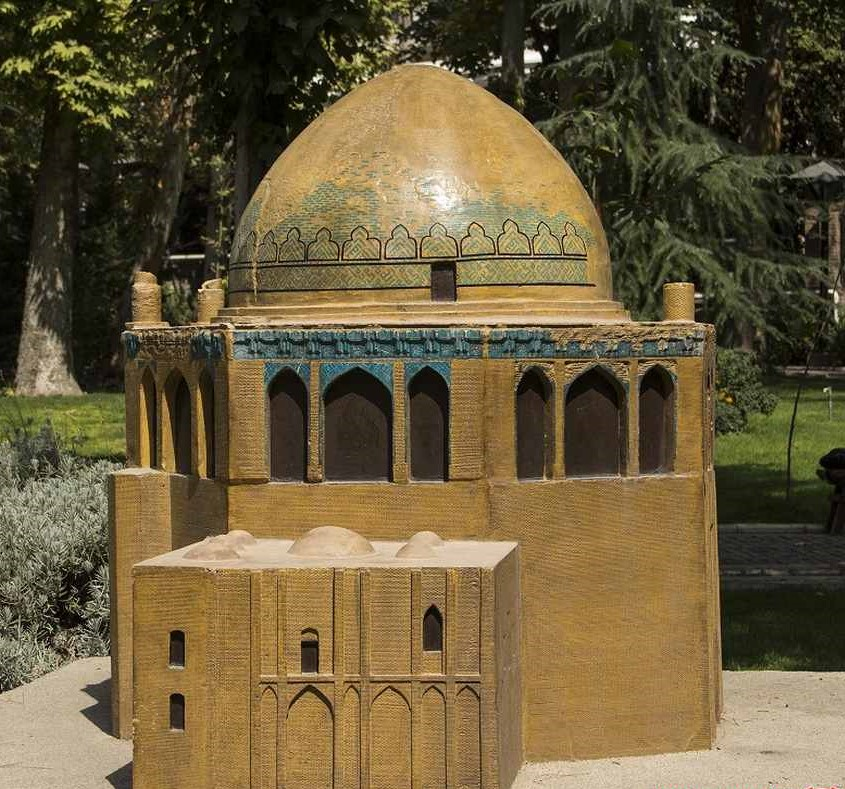
Model of Dome of Soltaniyeh

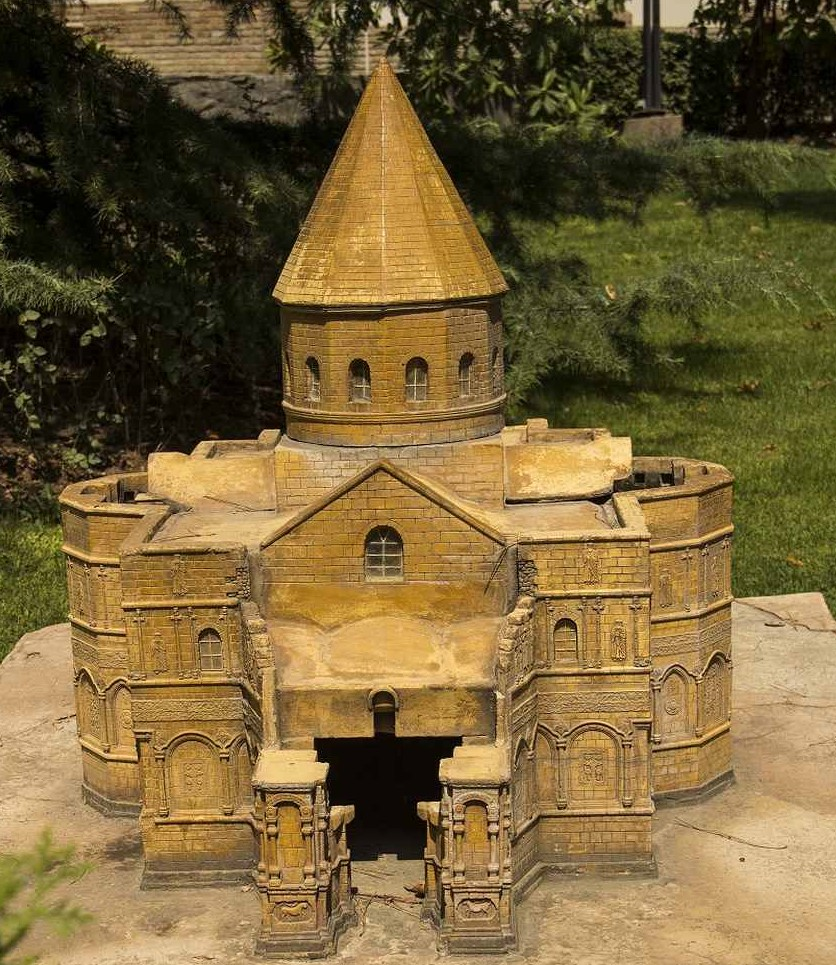
Model of Monastery of Saint Thaddeus
