= Shemiran =

Neighborhood in Tehran province, Iran

Shemiran شمیران
- District of Tehran
- Modern highrises of Elahieh in Shemiran, Tehran, Iran

- Location within Iran
- Coordinates: 35°50′52″N 51°33′09″E
- Country: Iran
- Province: Tehran
- County: Capital of Shemiranat, but located within Tehran
- Time zone: UTC+3:30 (IRST)
  - Summer (DST): UTC+4:30 (IRDT)

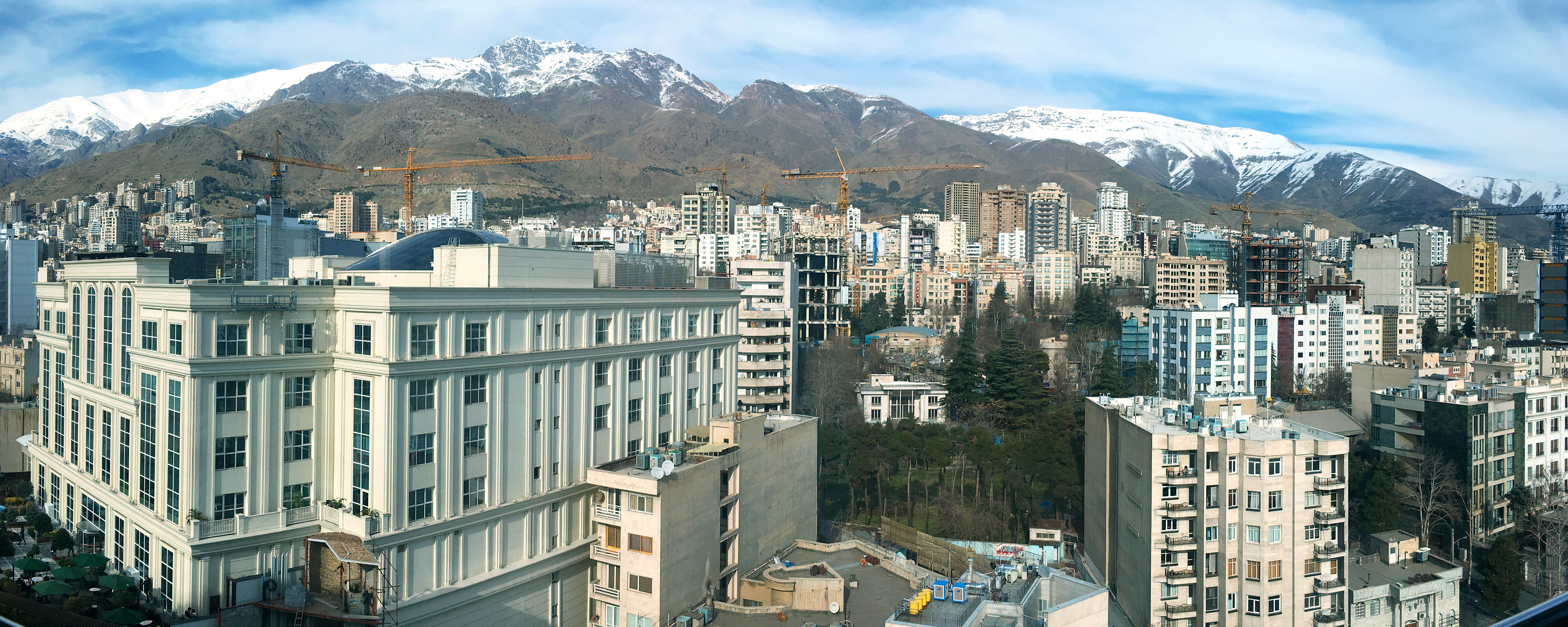
Shemiran, Tehran, near the central Alborz mountain range

Shemirān (Persian: شمیران, pronounced [ʃemiːˈɾɒːn]) (Note: Also romanized as Šemirân and Shemīrān; also known as Shemirānāt (شمیرانات; [ʃemiːɾɒːˈnɒːt]) is the capital of Shemiranat County, Tehran Province, Iran, but is actually located just north of the borders of Tehran County along Chamran Expressway and Sadr Expressway and it is the northernmost district of the city of Tehran.

Shemiran lies in the slopes of Alborz Mountain and enjoys a suitable mild climate. It has fine and well-kept parks and is home to the richest class of Iranian society. Most of the foreign embassies and the Tehran International Fair are situated in Shemiran.

It is also where Imam Zadeh Saleh is, and where the former home of Ruhollah Khomeini was located.

Among the neighborhoods of Shemiran are: Darakeh, Darband, Jamaran, and Niavaran on the far north, as well as Zafaraniyeh, Elahiyeh, Velenjak, Gheytarieh, Farmanieh, Kamranieh, jordan, amaniyeh, and lavasan .

== Etymology ==
[tʃ] phoneme, i.e. [tʃ] was replaced by [ʃ]) consisted of two parts: "cham" (meaning "cold" in Avestan; "zama" or "zem") + "ran" (meaning "slope"). In fact "shemran" means "the cold place" or "the cold slope".

It is common in the Iranian languages that the letter "z" (Persian: "ز") changes to letter "ch" (Persian: "چ"), For example in Persian the word "ruz" or "rooz" (day), from Middle Persian "roch", is still "roch" in Balochi language and "roj" in Kurdish. Another example is the word "zemestan" (winter) consisted of two parts: "zem" (cold) + "estan" or "istan" (being, or existence), which sometimes can be seen in Persian Literature and common usage as "chamestan" or "chemestan".

== Language ==
The language spoken from the center of Oshan to Jeiroud and Tajrish in the south is a kind of Perso-Tabari and has the features of Caspian languages. In far years the natives of Tehran who lived in area of Vanak and Shemiran had knowledge of Mazandarani language because of being bordered by the Mazandaran Province. Russian orientalist and linguist Valentin Zhukovski on a trip to Iran in the late 19th century got to know the Tajrishi dialect, a dialect that is similar to Mazandarani language and mentions it in his works. Until today there are people in areas of Doulab, Shah Abdol-Azim Shrine and others who speak with the Shemirani accent which is a modified version of Mazandarani language.

== Climate ==
The annual temperature of Shemiran in Saadabad meteorological station according to the statistics of 20 years (1975-1995) is 12.9 degrees Celsius. The average rainfall of Shemiran from 1988 to 2007 was 435.8 mm. The highest recorded temperature from 1988 to 2007 was +39.8 degrees Celsius. The number of days with snowfall in Shemiran is 24 days per year.

== Neighborhoods ==
- Darabad
- Ajoudanieh
- Aghdasieh
- Farmanieh
- Kamranieh
- Niavaran
- Jamaran
- Tajrish
- Darband
- Zafaraniyeh
- Mahmoodieh
- Zana
- Elahieh
- Gheytarieh
- Velenjak
- Darakeh
- Evin
- Gholhak
- Ekhtiarieh
- Ozgol
- darrous
- jordan
- amaniyeh
- lavasan
- boukan

== Education ==
The Pietro Della Valle Italian School, an Italian international school, is in the Farmanieh district.The Pakistani embassy school is in the Jordan district.

== See also ==
- Lavasan
- Fasham
- Afjeh
- Tabaristan
- Tajrish
