= Pietro Della Valle Italian School =

- Scuola Italiana Teheran “Pietro Della Valle”
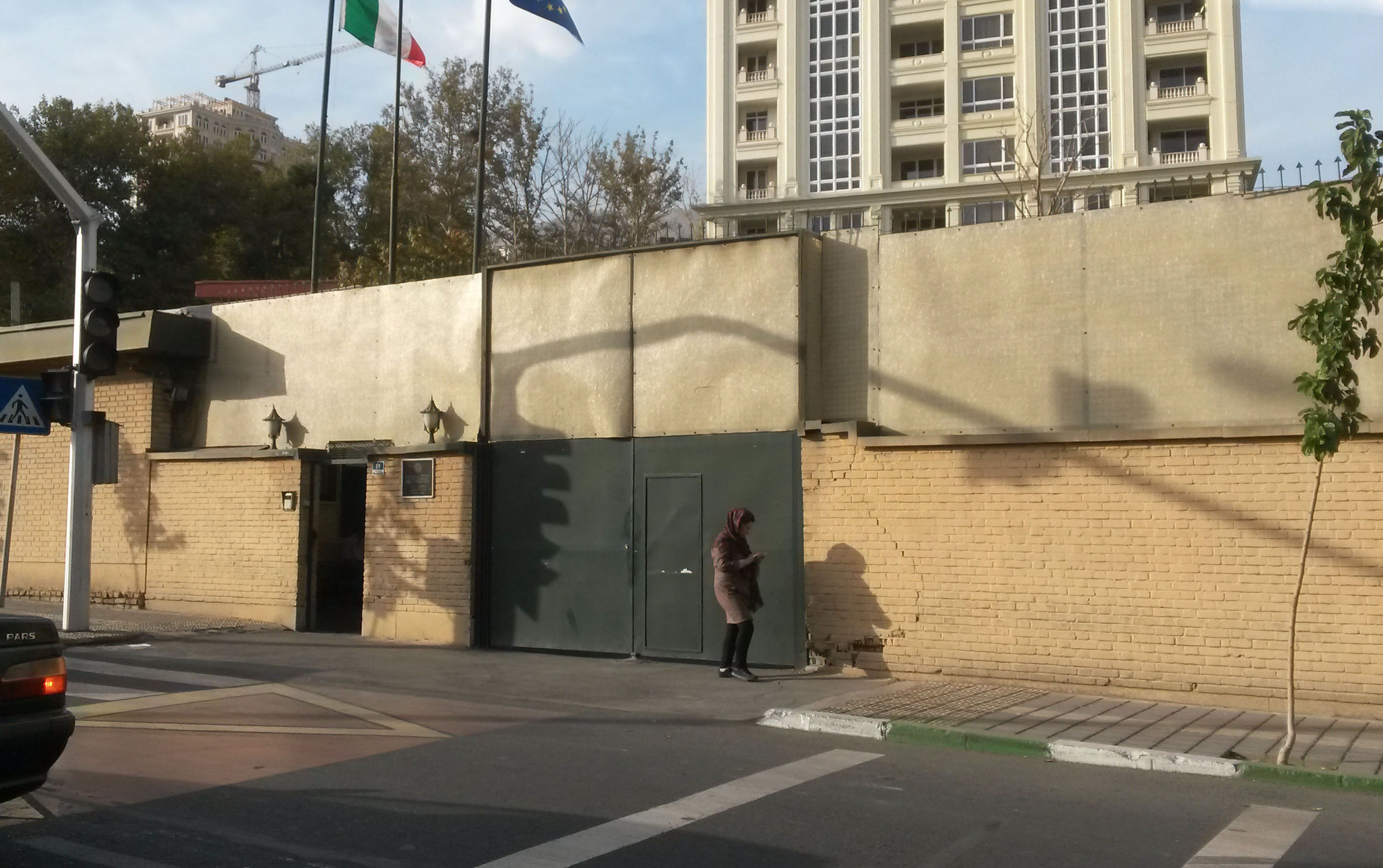

Location
- Farmanieh, Lavassani Ave. n. 47 – 1954643113 Tehran (Iran); Tehran; Iran; 35.8009061°N 51.465466900000024°E

Information
- Type: Senior High School
- Website: www.scuolaitalianatehran.com

Pietro Della Valle Italian School (Italian: Scuola italiana Pietro Della Valle; Persian: مدرسۀ ایتالیایی پیترو دلاواله, romanized: Madrase-ye itâliyâyi-ye Piyetro Delâvâle) is an Italian international school in Farmanieh, a district in Shemiran, Tehran, Iran. It offers courses from kindergarten through senior high school and Italian language courses based on CEFR and CILS.
