= Sohrevardi (neighbourhood) =

- Neighbourhood in Tehran
- Location within Iran
- Coordinates: 35°35′N 51°26′E
- Country: Iran
- Province: Tehran
- Time zone: UTC+3:30 (IRST)

Sohrevardi is a neighbourhood of Tehran, Iran. It is named after Shahab al-Din Suhrawardi, an Iranian philosopher, and it starts from Seyed khandan bridge to Bahar shiraz Street.
