= Niavaran Park =

Park in Tehran, Iran

Coordinates: 35°48′32″N 51°28′18″E

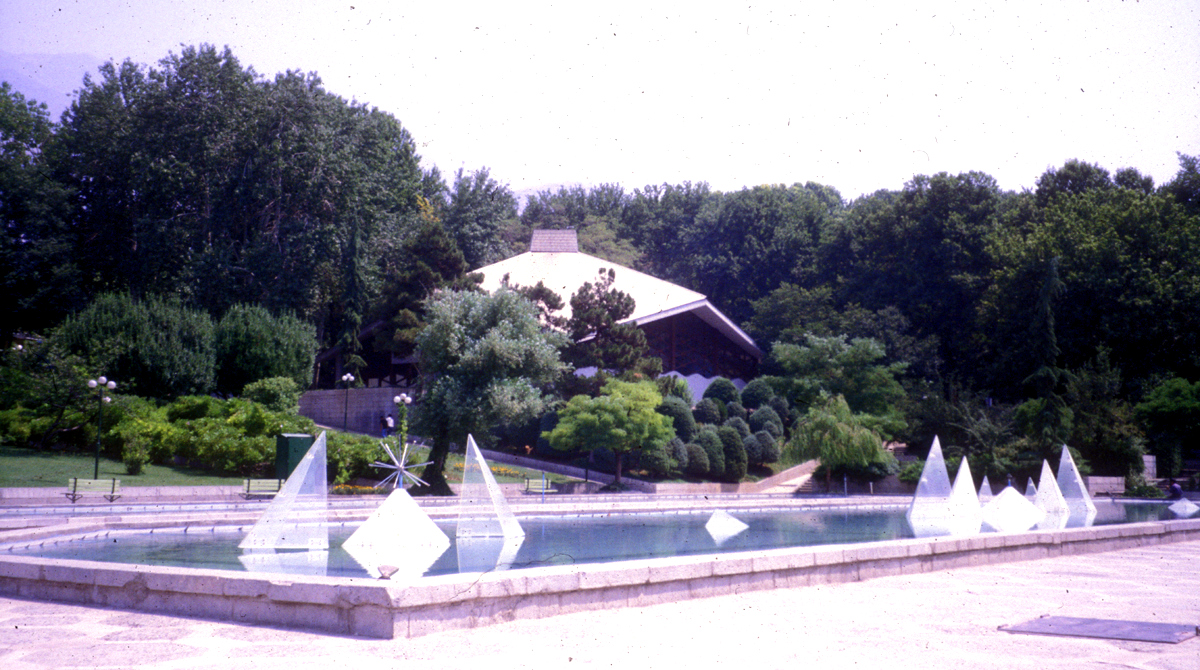
The Niavaran Public Library is within the Niavaran city park, 2005

Niavaran Park (Persian: بوستان نیاوران) is a public park in northern Tehran at Shahid Bahonar Street. It is located within the Niavaran district and is situated immediately south of the Niavaran Palace Complex. The park was established in 1969 by the order of the last shah of Iran, Mohammad Reza Pahlavi. The area of Niavaran Park is 62,000 square meters. The park's extensive fountains take up 3320 square meters, and green space includes 8000 square meters of flowers, 20,000 square meters of lawn.

The park is equipped with playgrounds for children and sport facilities as well as chess tables and ping pong tables. The park includes the Children's Cultural Center and library, as well as a prayer hall and four large pools. Walking is a popular activity according to a survey of visitors in 2008.

In 2000, a canal was built to provide water to the park from the Niavaran aqueduct.

== In popular culture ==
Niavaran Park is referenced in the Tom Clancy novels Support and Defend (2014) and Under Fire (2016).
