= Greater Tehran =

Metropolitan area in Iran

Greater Tehran Metropolitan Area and Suburbs کلانشهر تهران بزرگ و حومه
- Tehran-Karaj-Eslamshahr Metropolitan Area ناحیه‌ی کلانشهری تهران-کرج-اسلامشهر
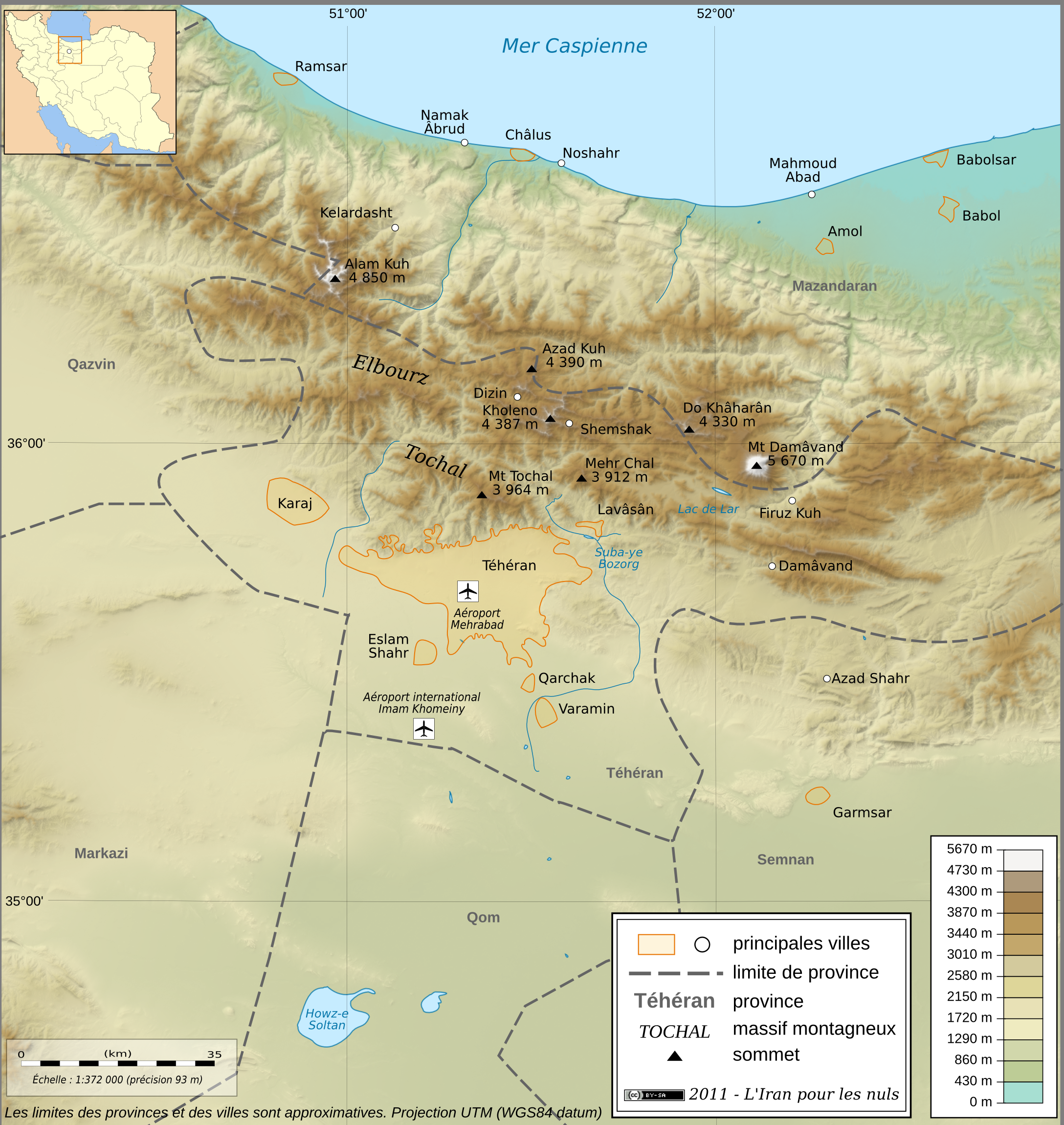

- Location within Iran
- Coordinates: 35°41′46″N 51°25′23″E
- Country: Iran
- Province: Tehran
- Established: 1778
- Core city: Tehran
- Satellite cities: – Karaj; – Eslamshahr; – Damavand

Area
  - Urban: 730 km^{2} (280 sq mi)
  - Metro: 9,500 km^{2} (3,700 sq mi)
- Elevation: 1,200 to 1,980 m (3,940 to 6,500 ft)

Population (2016)
  - Density: 1,600/km^{2} (4,100/sq mi)
  - Urban: 8,846,782
  - Metro: 15,000,000
  - Population Rank in Iran: 1st
- Time zone: UTC+03:30 (IRST)
- Area code: 021
- Website: Tehran.ir

Greater Tehran Metropolitan Area is the urban agglomeration around Tehran that covers the central part of the Tehran Province and eastern part of the Alborz Province, that covers the contiguous cities of Tehran, Karaj, Ray, Shemirānāt, and other areas.

As of 2012, Greater Tehran had a population of close to 14 million residents. The 2016 census had the population at 13.3 million in Tehran Province (only 200 thousands of them outside Tehran and the suburban counties) and 2.2 million in Karaj and Fardis combined. Therefore, it can be estimated that the population of the urban agglomeration was approximately 15 million people in 2016, and it is sinking at a rate of 25 cm per year due to the accelerated influx and overuse of natural resources.

Since the 1960s, much of Greater Tehran's growth has been caused by an influx of urban poor into informal settlements on the fringe.

== Similar related names ==
Greater Tehran should not be confused with the following:

- Tehran Province (area 18,814 km^{2}, population 13.27 m – 2016). Part of the province is too far from Tehran and has too low a population density to be classified as the part of agglomeration
- Tehran County (area 1,300 km^{2}, population 8.85 million (2016) with 97.5% of the population living in Tehran City itself)
- Tehran City includes 22 districts, two of them fully and one partially are located outside of Tehran County. The city's area is about 730 km^{2}. The extension of the city to other counties began in 1973 to include the villages surrounding the city of Tajrish (Evin, Darakeh, Niyavaran, Rostan Abad, Gholhak, Zargandeh, Elahiyeh, Davoudiyeh, and Zarrabkhaneh) and the cities of Vanak and Rey to which “Kooye Siman” had been annexed during the years 1956 to 1966.

== Airports ==
Tehran has three international airports: Mehrabad Airport, Imam Khomeini Airport, and Payam Airport. Mehrabad Airport is used for domestic flights, Imam Khomeini Airport is for international flights, and Payam Airport is for air cargo.

== Geography ==
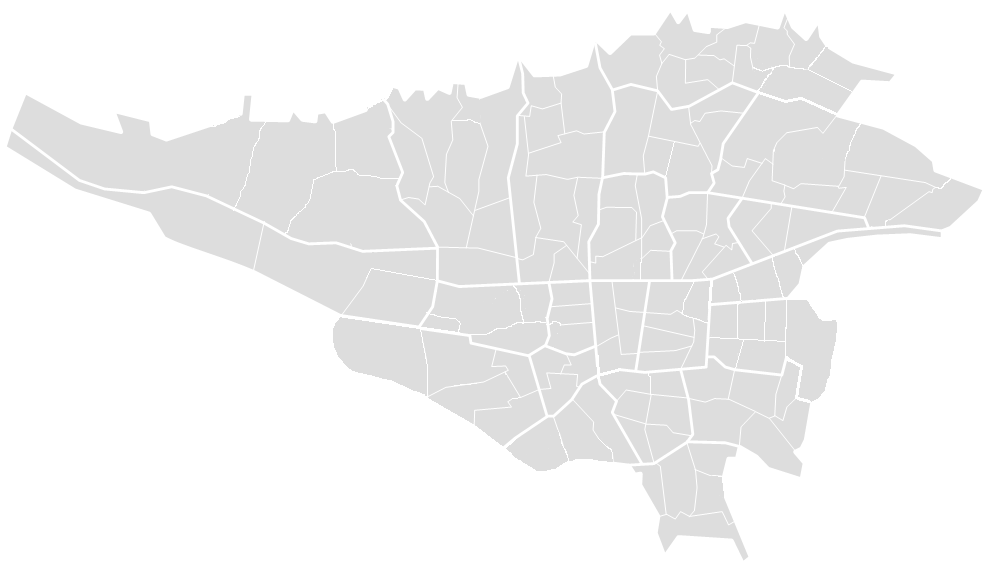

There is no exact definition of Tehran agglomeration borders and composition. Beside Tehran County, also Shemiranat County, Ray County, Eslamshahr County, Pakdasht County, Robat-Karim County, Varamin County, Shahriar County, Qods County, Malard County, Pishva County, and Baharestan County in Tehran Province and also Karaj County and probably even Nazarabad County and Savojbolagh County in Alborz Province can be regarded as parts of the agglomeration.
