= Chizar =

Neighbourhood in Tehran, Iran

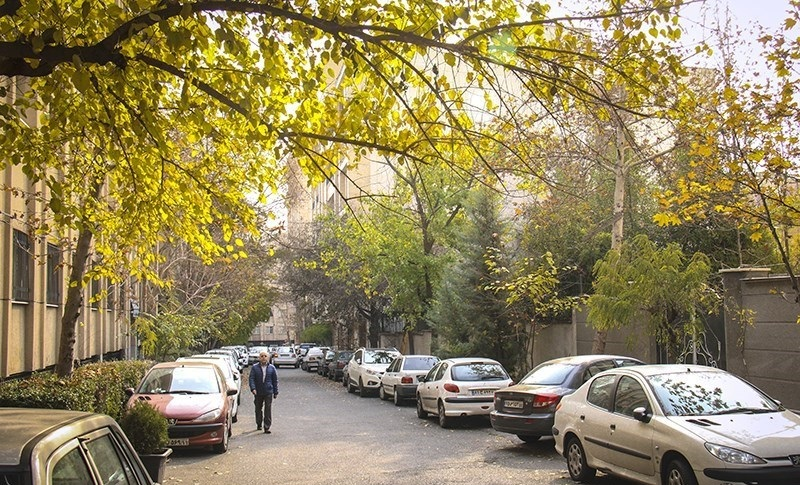
bordered

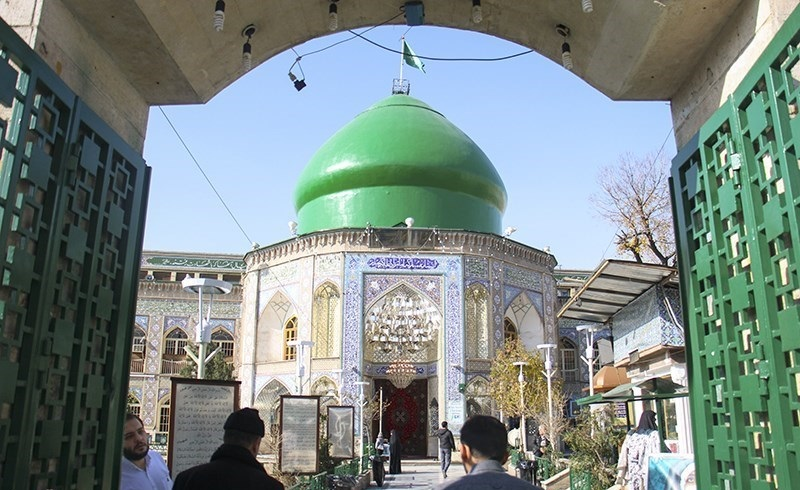
Imamzadeh Ali Akbar, Chizar

Chizar (Persian: چیذر) is a neighborhood in Shemiran, north of Tehran, Iran. Chizar used to be a village which was gradually annexed to the capital with the expansion of Tehran city. Chizar neighborhood has a long religious history indicated by the presence of Imamzadeh Ali Akbar.
