= Darakeh =

Village in Iran

Coordinates: 34°26′54″N 47°40′15″E

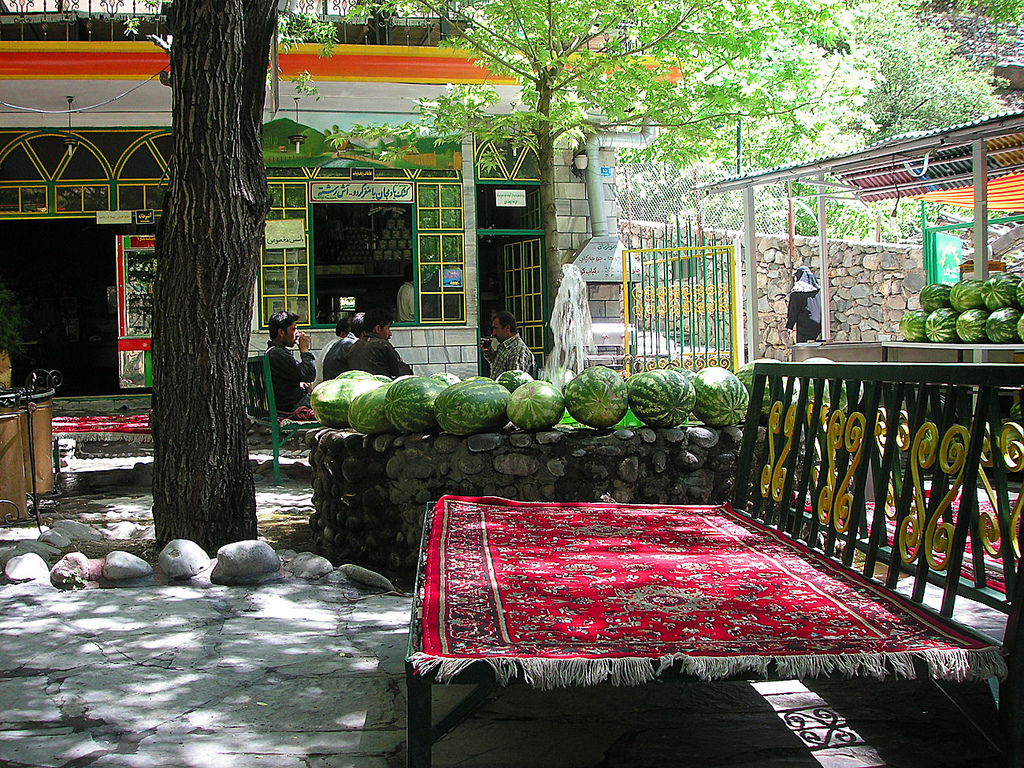
A restaurant in Darakeh

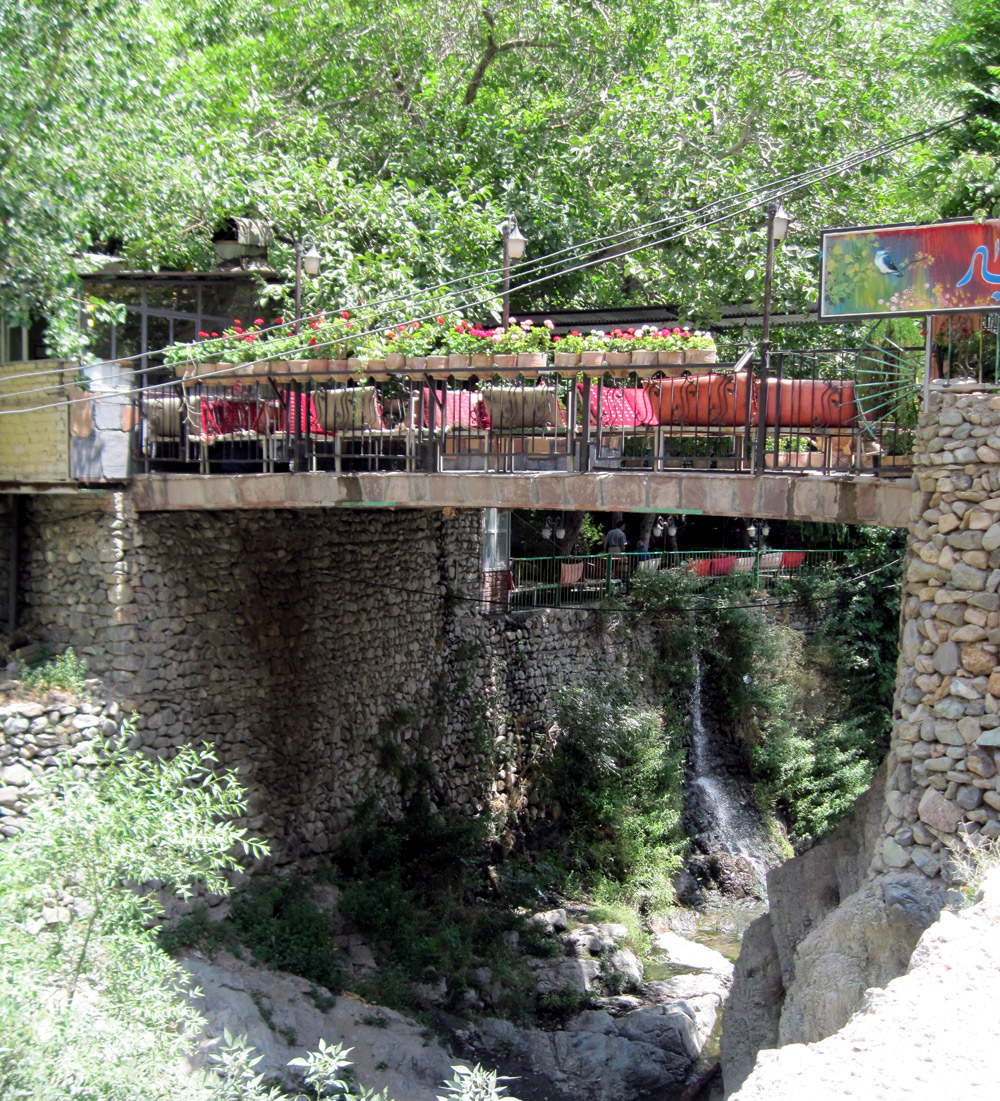
A restaurant in Darakeh

Darakeh is an area in District 2 of Tehran province in Iran. It is near Evin and Velenjak.

The area is popular with tourists as a hiking and mountain climbing destination, and is also the site of numerous seismic fault zones.
