= Evin =

Neighbourhood in the north of Tehran, Iran

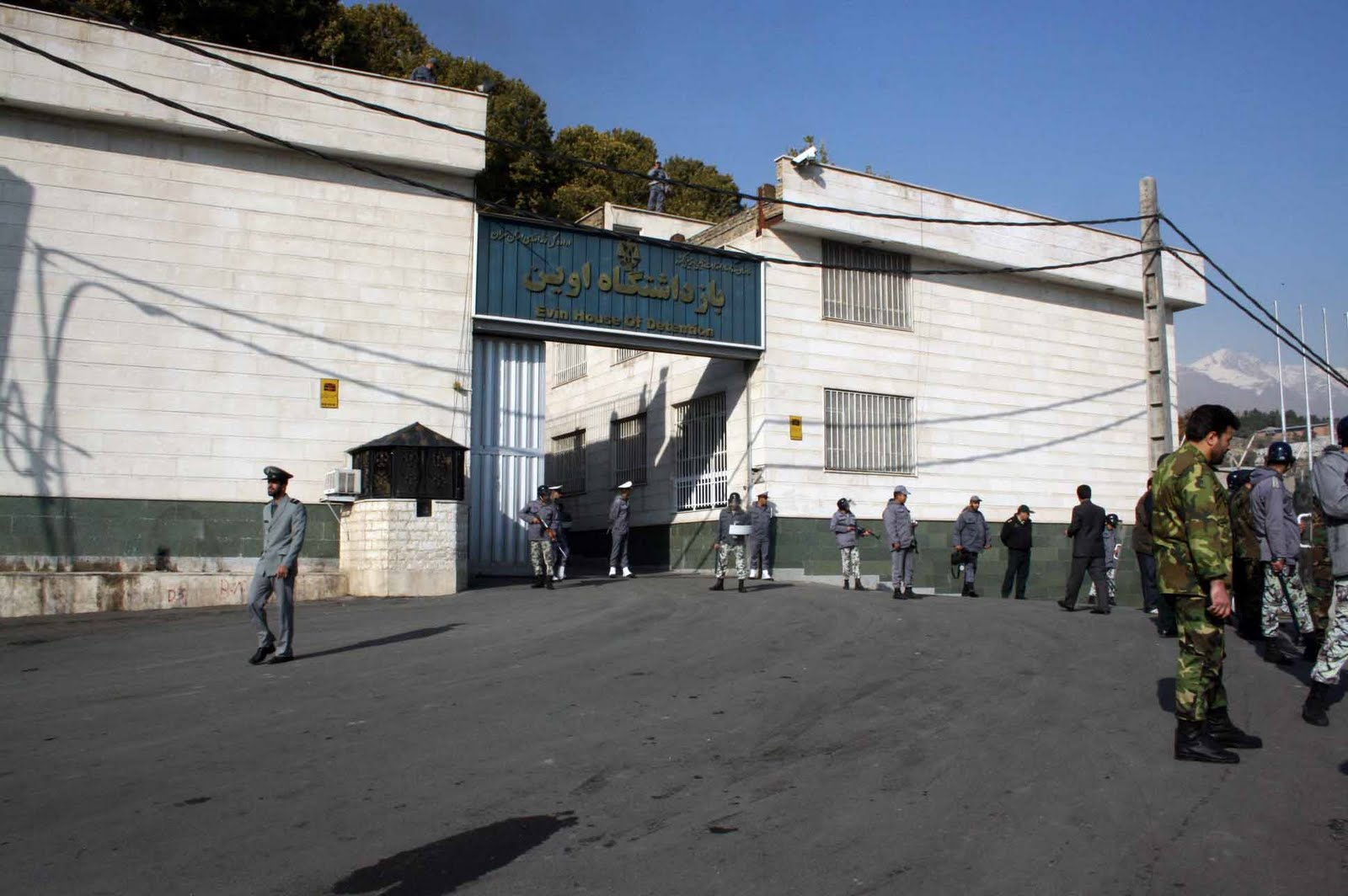
Evin House of Detention

Evin is a neighbourhood in the north of Tehran.

The district consists of an old section with homes surrounded by orchards and gardens and a new section with high rises and skyscrapers.

It is adjacent to Shahid Beheshti University campus. Evin Prison, a detention center known for its torture of political prisoners, is located nearby.

Outside the neighborhood is the Darakeh hiking trail which brings many hikers to the area.
