= Sadr Expressway =

Road in Tehran, Iran

Seyyed Mohammad Bagher Sadr Expressway

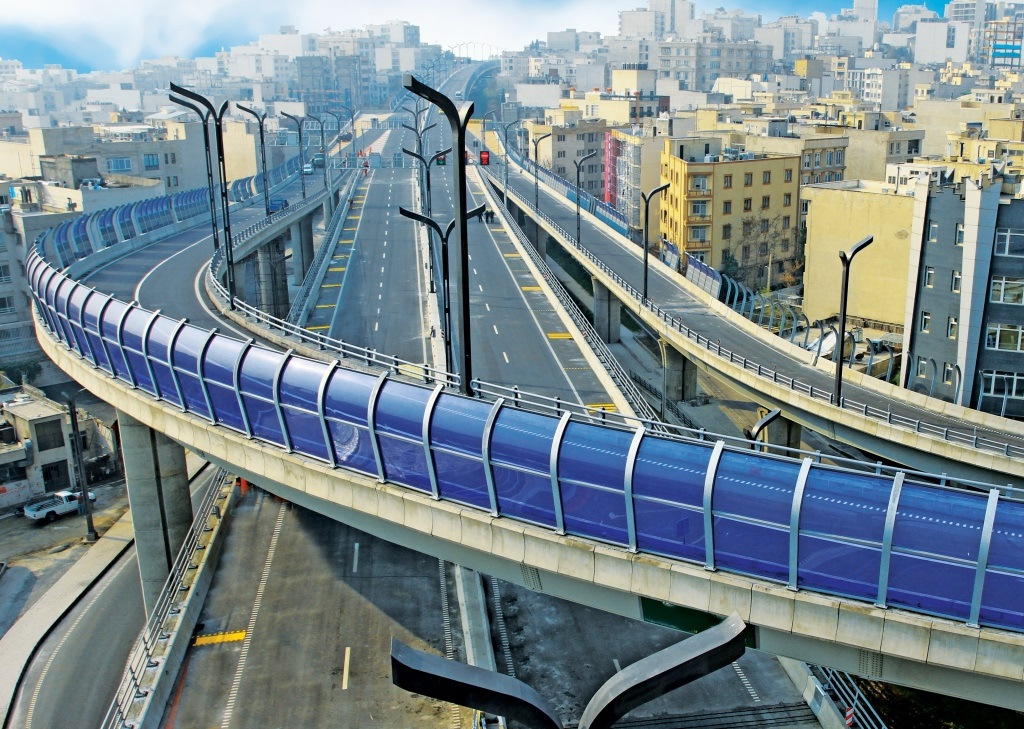

Route information
- Length: 5.0 km (3.1 mi)

Major junctions
- West end: Modares Expressway
- East end: Babayi Expressway; Pasdaran Street

Location
- Country: Iran
- Major cities: Tehran

Highway system
- Highways in Iran; Freeways

Sadr Expressway is a freeway in northern Tehran, Iran.

This freeway runs west from the Modarres Expressway in Gholhak neighborhood east through Gheytarieh, Doulat, Darrous, Chizar, and Ekhtiariyeh, at which point it crosses Pasdaran Avenue and becomes Babayi Expressway.

From West to East
Modares Expressway
Shariati Street
Kaveh Boulevard
Qeitarieh Street
Shahid Bazdar Street
Dasvare Boulevard
Babayi Expressway; Pasdaran Street Nobonyad Metro Station
From East to West
