= Elahieh =

Affluent district in Tehran, Iran

Coordinates: 35°47′20″N 51°25′43″E

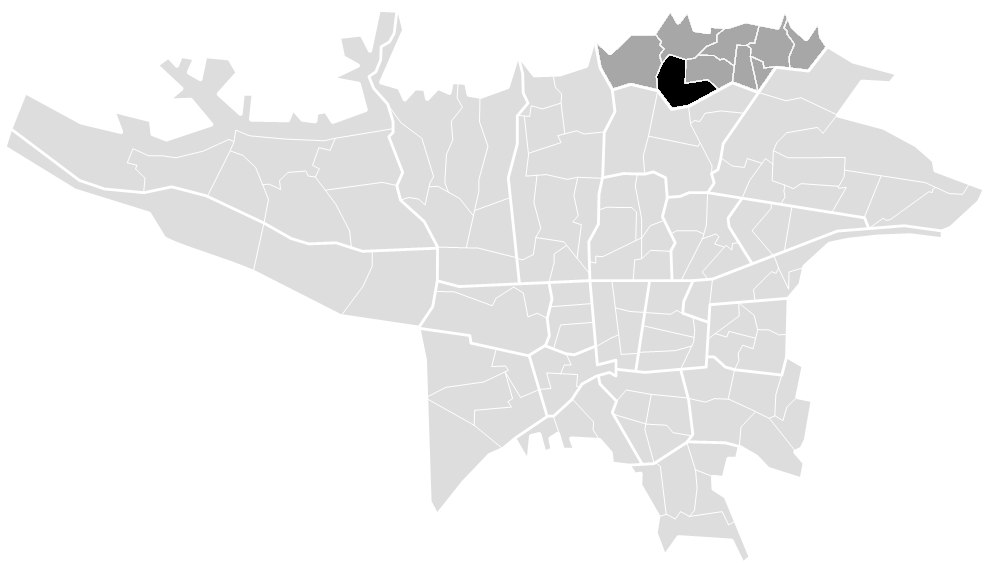
Location of Elahiyeh (black) in Municipal District No. 1 (dark grey) of Tehran metropolis

Elahieh (Persian: الهیه, lit. 'Divine Place'; also spelt Elahiyeh) is a neighborhood in northern Tehran and the Shemiran district. It is bounded by Tajrish to the north, Valiasr Street and Modarres Expressway to the west, Sadr Bridge to the south, and Shariati Street to the east. Elahieh is located in District 1 of Tehran Municipality and within Shemiranat County. This area hosts many diplomatic buildings and residences for foreign nationals.

Elahieh is considered one of the wealthiest areas in Tehran. While it is now a residential area with expensive apartments, it was previously home to large, privately owned gardens. It is home to the Iranian Art Museum Garden. According to the Divar website, the most expensive houses and shops per square meter are located in Elahieh and Kamranieh.

The neighborhood is accessible via the Shahid Sadr Metro Station and Qeytarieh Metro Station.

The Dr. Hesabi Museum and the Iranian Music Museum are located in this area. Additionally, embassies of Switzerland, Denmark, Belgium, Finland, Malaysia, Egypt, and the gardens of the embassies of Russia, Germany, and Turkey are also situated here.

== History ==
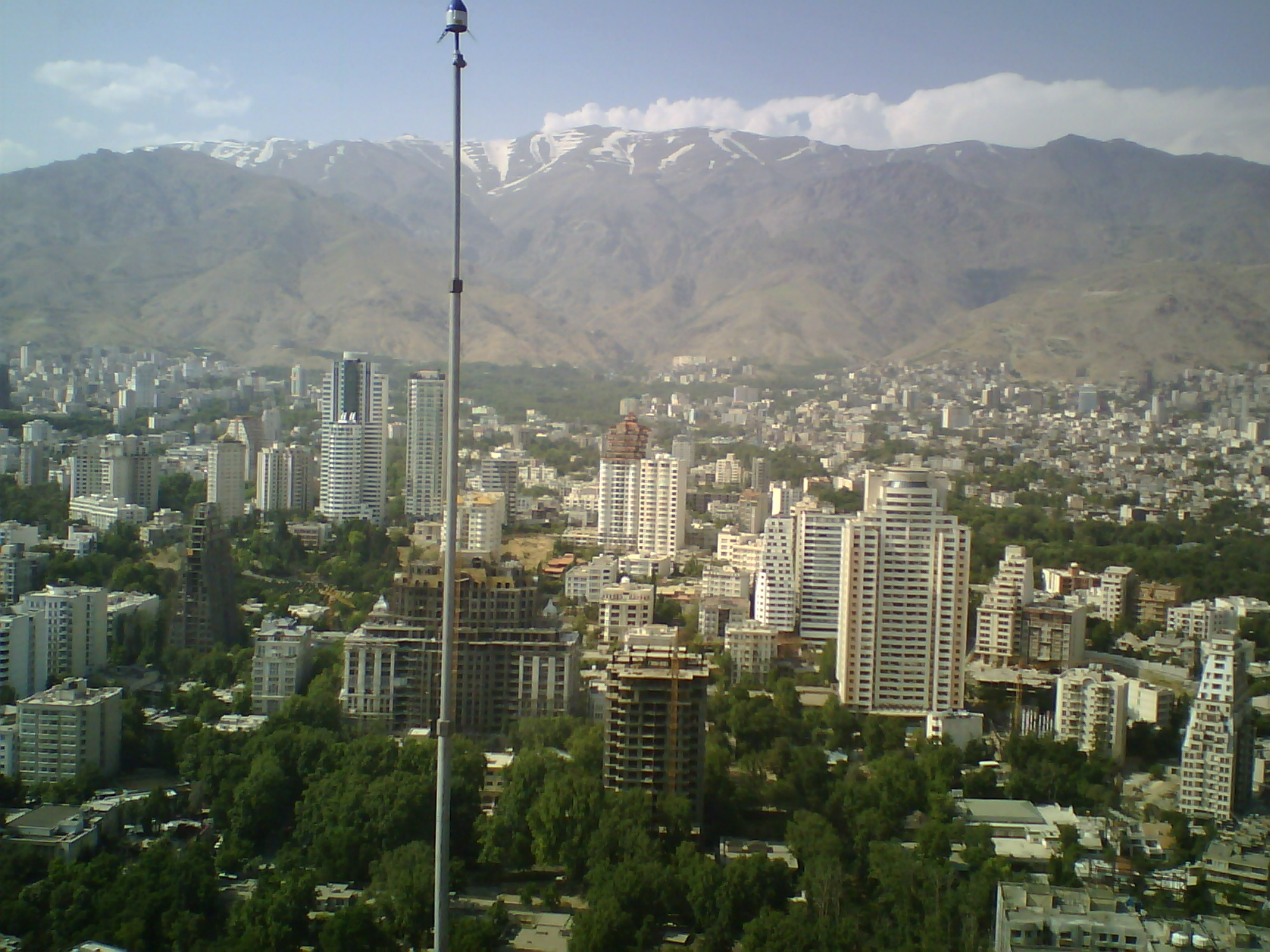
A view of the towers in Elahieh with the Alborz mountain range in the background

In the 1920s, the entirety of Elahiyeh was composed of just three estates that were previously possessions of a Qajar noble.

The lands of Elahieh, historically known as Khorazin, were once owned by Mohtaram-od-Dowleh, the wife of Amin-od-Dowleh. In 1286 AH (Islamic calendar), Mirza Jafar Hakim Elahi purchased six plots of land in Khalazir or Khorazin from the heirs of Mirza Hossein Tajrishi and Molla Mohammad Ali Tajrishi over three separate transactions. Later, these lands were named Elahieh after his ownership. Historically, the Elahieh area, previously called Khalazir or Khorazin, was not an independent village but was considered part of Zargandeh.

During the reign of Naser al-Din Shah Qajar, a matchstick factory was established in this area by Mirza Ali Khan Amin-od-Dowleh, the Qajar prime minister.

Three notable gardens are located in this neighborhood: the Oil Company Garden, the German Embassy Garden, and the Turkish Embassy Garden. The Oil Company Garden was initially owned by Mirza Mohammad Amin Daftar, the Mustofi of Khamsa, who established a flower garden there. After his death, it was passed to his wife, Fatemeh Khanum, the daughter of Asaf-od-Dowleh, governor of Khorasan, who sold it to the Anglo-Persian Oil Company.

== Notable areas ==
Fereshteh Street, Rumi Bridge (Tehran), Dr. Hesabi Museum, and the Iranian Music Museum are located in this area. Several embassies, including those of Switzerland, Denmark, Belgium, Finland, Malaysia, Egypt, and the gardens of the embassies of Russia, Germany, and Turkey, are situated in Elahieh.

Until 1993, Elahieh was the only area where construction of buildings taller than two stories was prohibited. Before the Iranian Revolution, the tallest building in Elahieh was a two-story villa belonging to Fallahi, a courtier, built on Elahieh Hill. However, the neighborhood is now filled with skyscrapers that dominate the skyline.

The gardens of Elahieh, once home to various birds and animals such as foxes, have largely been destroyed. These gardens, which acted as the lungs of the city, are now gone, worsening Tehran's air quality.

== Main streets ==
- Fereshteh Street
- Takhti Street (formerly Zhaleh Street)
- Elahieh Street
- Parsa Street
- Sahra Street (formerly Shokufandeh)
- Vasegh Nouri Street
- Shahed and Dashtyar Streets (formerly Khosravani)
- Chenaran Street
- Sarvestan Street
- Kamran Street (formerly Golnaz)
- Ahmad Latifi Street (formerly Shaghayegh)
- Mobasher Street (formerly Moshar-ol-Molk)
- Kohyar Street (formerly Namdar)
- Namazi Street (formerly Mehran)
- Mahdieh Street (formerly Esfandiari)
- Khazar Street (formerly Basir-od-Dowleh)
- Sharifi Manesh Street (formerly Bostan)
- Bosnia and Herzegovina Street (formerly Amir Timur)
- Maryam Street
- Agha Bozorgi Street (formerly Amin-od-Dowleh)
- Jordan Street

== Notable residents ==
- Mahmoud Hessabi
- Ashraf-ol-Molouk Fakhr-od-Dowleh
- Ahmad Amir Ahmadi
- Esmail Mehrtash

== See also ==
- Zafaraniyeh
- Fereshteh Pasargad Hotel
- Iranian Art Museum Garden
