= Zafaraniyeh =

Neighborhood of Tehran

Zafaraniyeh زعفرانیه
- Neighbourhood of Tehran
- Interactive map of Zafaraniyeh
- Country: Iran
- Province: Tehran province
- County: Tehran County
- City: Tehran
- District: Shemiran

Zafaraniyeh (Persian: زعفرانیه) is a neighbourhood in northern Tehran, Iran.
