= Niavaran =

District in northern Tehran, Iran

Coordinates: 35°49′N 51°28′E

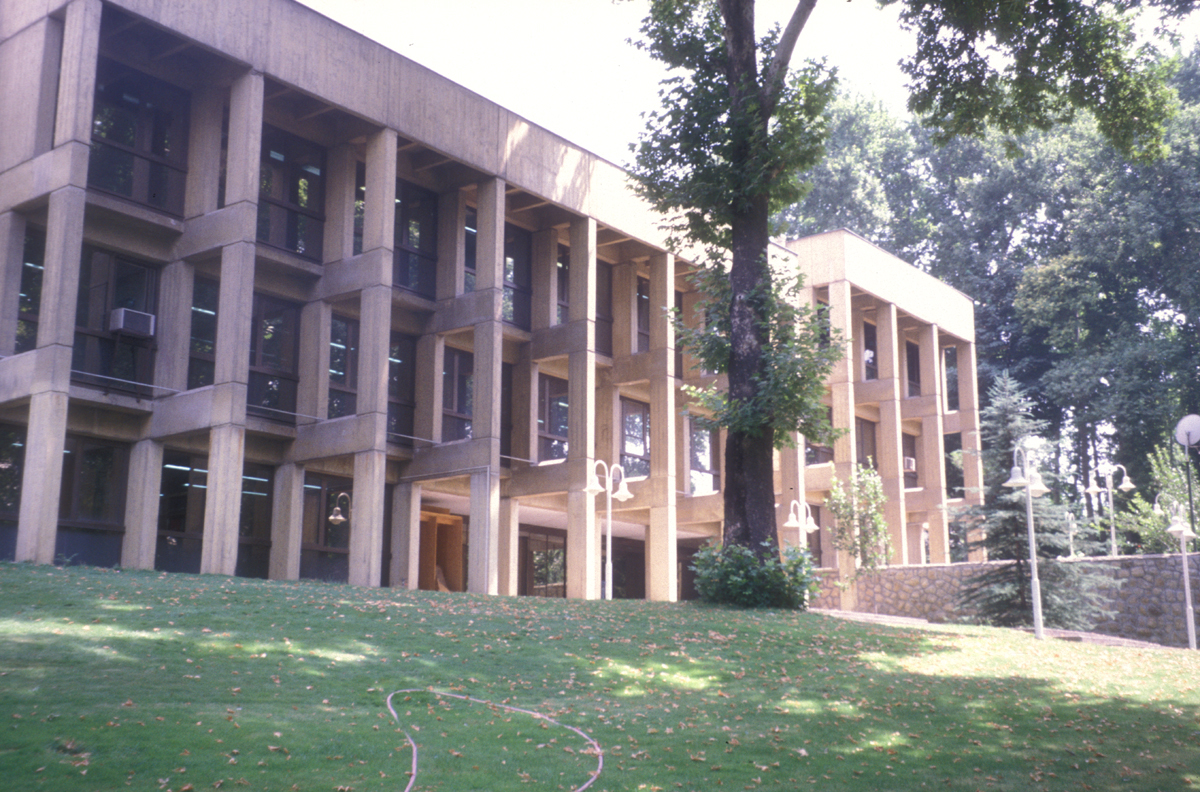
The Niavaran Building of the Institute for Research in Fundamental Sciences (IPM)

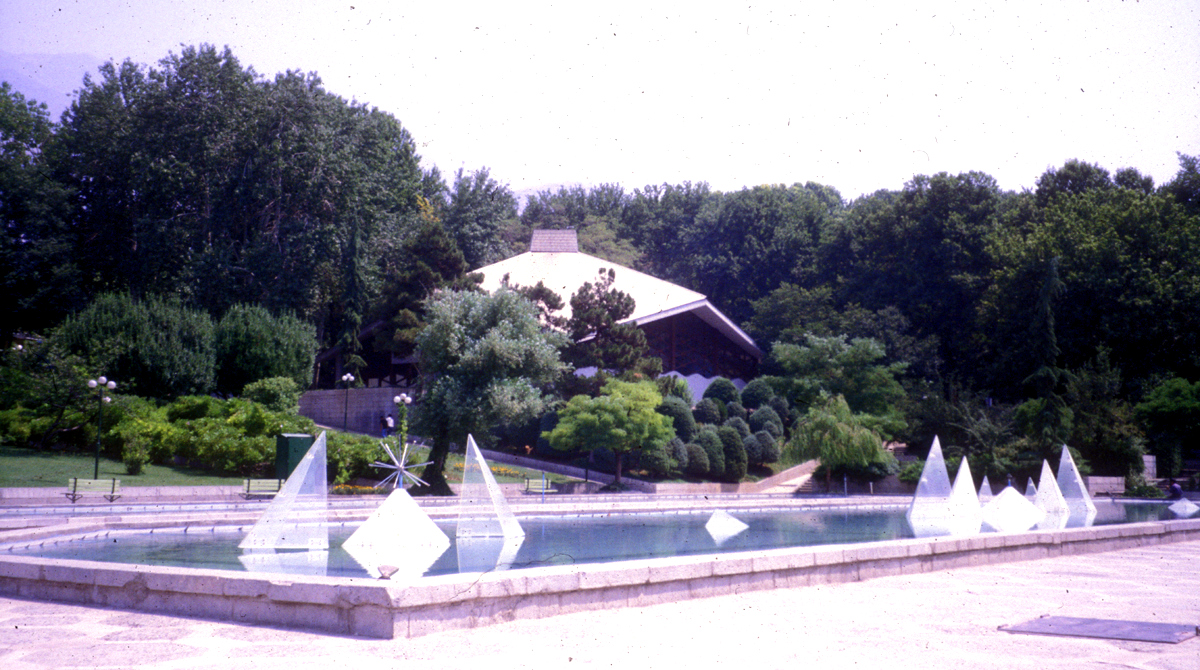
The Niavaran Public Library, within the Niavaran city park

Niavaran (Persian: نياوران) is an affluent and upperclass district in northern Tehran, Iran. Bordering the leafy, uphill-winding Darband Street, it can be reached from Tajrish Square, and it is close to Darabad in the far north-eastern corner of Greater Tehran.

== Culture ==
The aqueduct of flumes was the base for Niavaran district nearly hundreds years ago, this led to the extensive flourish of this land and consequently superb conditions for living. These did not stay away from the eyes of ruling dynasties in Iran, more particularly Qajar families in the 19th century. They initiated major constructions of summer house villas and palaces and from there a deluxe lifestyle became the set-mark of this region in Tehran.

Niavaran as a whole consists of three sub-regions and those are Manzariyeh, Niavaran and Jamal Abad, all of which are situated in the first district of Tehran precisely in the north. It is home to the affluent as well as many artists, and replete with cultural riches such as Niavaran Palace Complex, Niavaran Park, and the Farhangsara (cultural centre) that includes an amphitheatre, museum, music hall, and Café Gallerie, a courtyard coffee shop with indoor exhibition space.

== Notable sights ==
The architecture is unique in that the area's graded slopes have given rise to multilevel layouts and idiosyncratic lofts. Being situated on the city foothills (1700 metres above sea level), Niavaran has a cooler climate all year round compared to the rest of Tehran, and excellent vantage points.
