= List of Tehran metropolis parks =

Tehran, the capital of Iran, has more than 800 well-kept parks. With increasing population growth in Tehran, former grasslands have been converted into urban parks; built-up land is expected to reach 62% by 2032.

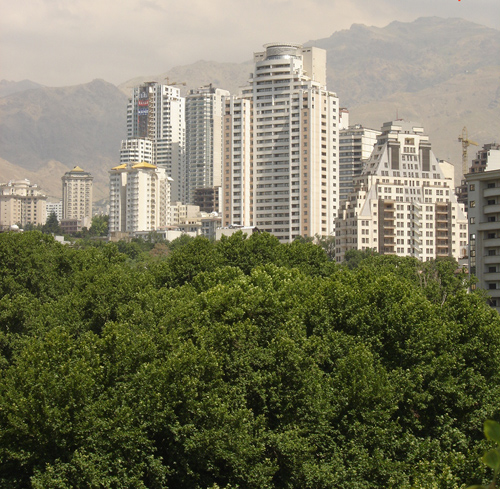
Tehran parks are surrounded by high-rise buildings

== Recreational parks ==
- Gheytarieh Park, in Gheytarieh
- Jahan-e Kudak Park, in Davoodiyeh
- Jamshidieh Park
- Laleh Park
- Mellat Park
- Niavaran Park
- Park-e Shahr
- Police Park
- Saei Park, in Valiasr Street
- Shatranj Park
- Tehran Waterfall Park

== Forest parks ==
- Chitgar Park
- Lavizan Forest Park
- Vard-Avard Forest Park

== National parks ==
- Khajeer National Park
- Kaveer National Park
- Lar Protected Natural Habitat
- Varjeen Protected Natural Habitat

== Other parks ==
- Azadi Sport Complex park
- Pardisan
- Ab-o-Atash Park, founded in 2009
