= Mohammad Rasekh =

Iranian translator

Prof. Mohammad Rasekh
- محمد راسخ
- Born: 1963 (age 62–63); Tehran, Iran
- Education: Phd
- Alma mater: University of Tehran; London School of Economics; University of Manchester

Mohammad Rasekh (Persian: محمد راسخ, born 1963) is an Iranian lawyer and researcher and professor of the Department of Public Law at the Faculty of Law of Shahid Beheshti University and a member of the Ibn Sina Scientific Research Institute. In 2010 and 2017, he was recognized as a model researcher at Shahid Beheshti University. Also, the book History of Islamic Legal Theories, translated by him, won the Book of the Season Award in 2008.

He also has a seminary education, dealing with the philosophy of law, public law and interdisciplinary issues of law and ethics and philosophy, has made an important impact on the field of law in Iran and has written and translated important and lasting works in Iranian legal literature. Among these works are the translation of a brief history of legal theory in the West and written works such as "Theoretical Foundation for Legislative Reform" and "Stem Cell: Law and Ethics". He is currently a member of the editorial board of the specialized scientific quarterly of legal encyclopedias.

== Life ==
Mohammad Rasekh received his bachelor's degree in law from the University of Tehran and spent about ten years regularly in seminaries and seminary meetings in Tehran up to level Islamic science courses such as Arabic language, logic, jurisprudence, principles, history, interpretation, He read theology and philosophy. He then went on to study law and economics, and philosophy of law at the University of London until his master's degree, and received his doctorate in law and philosophy from the University of Manchester.

Rasekh became a member of the faculty of the Faculty of Law of Shahid Beheshti University in 1998 and is currently a professor in the Department of Public Law of this university and a member of the Ibn Sina Scientific Research Institute. In 2010 and 2017, Mohammad Rasekh was recognized as a model researcher at Shahid Beheshti University. Also, the book History of Islamic Legal Theories written by Wael Ibn Halaq and translated by him won the Book of the Season Award in 2008.

== Bibliography ==
- Philosophy of Law and Philosophy of Public Law, Mohammad Rasekh, Tehran: House of Humanities Thinkers
- Regulation in the Judiciary, Mohammad Rasekh, Tehran: Drak, 2015
- Comparative study of general law education, Tehran, 2016.
- Fundamentals of Public Law, Mohammad Rasekh (translator), Tehran: Ney Publishing
- The Concept of Law, Herbert Lionel Adolfones Hart, Mohammad Rasekh (Translator), Tehran: Ney Publishing, 2011
- History of Islamic Legal Theories: An Introduction to the Principles of Sunni Jurisprudence, Wael Halaq, Mohammad Rasekh (Translator), Tehran: Nashr-e Ney
- Right and Expediency: Articles in Philosophy of Law, Philosophy of Law and Philosophy of Value, Mohammad Rasekh, Volume One, Tehran: New Plan
- Right and Expediency: Articles in Philosophy of Law, Philosophy of Law and Philosophy of Value, Mohammad Rasekh, Volume 2, Tehran: Nashr-e Ney
- Supervision and Balance in the Constitutional Law System, Mohammad Rasekh, Tehran: Drak
- Theoretical Foundation for Legislative Reform, Mohammad Rasekh, Tehran: Parliamentary Research Center
- A Brief History of Legal Theory in the West, John Morris Kelly, Mohammad Rasekh (Translator), Tehran: New Plan, 2004
- Freedom, Ethics, Law (An Introduction to the Philosophy of Criminal and Public Law), Herbert Hart, Mohammad Rasekh (Translator), Tehran: New Plan, 2009
- Culture of Legal Theory, Brian H. Bix, Translators Group, Tehran: Ney Publishing, 2010
- Genetics: Law, Ethics, Psychology (collection of articles), Authors' Group, Tehran: Ibn Sina Research Institute, 2011
- Stem Cell: Ethics and Law, Mohammad Rasekh, Mohammad Mehdi Akhoondi, Amir Hossein Khodaparast, Arash Mahdab, Lily Monfared, Tehran: Ibn Sina Research Institute Publications, 2010
- Religion, Law and the Origin of Constitutional Thought [Translation], Tehran: Contemporary View.
