= Abolhassan Sadighi =

Iranian sculptor and painter 1894–1995

Abolhassan Khan Sadighi
- ابوالحسن‌خان صدیقی
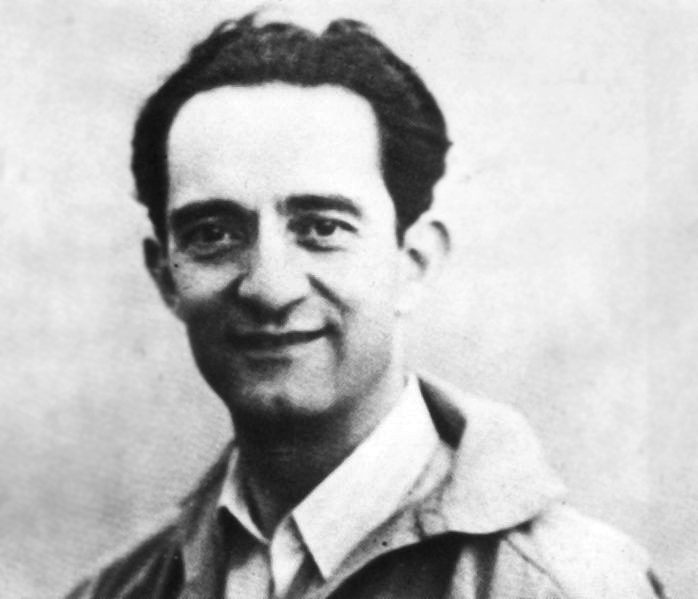
- Master Abolhassan Khan Sadighi
- Born: Abolhassan Sadighi; 5 October 1894; Tehran, Iran
- Died: 11 December 1995 (aged 101); Tehran, Iran
- Education: Master Kamal al-Molk Ghafarri
- Known for: Sculpture and painting
- Notable work: Ferdowsi, Amir Kabir, Avicenna, Khayyam and Nader Shah statues

Abolhassan Sadighi (Persian: ابوالحسن صدیقی) (5 October 1894 – 11 December 1995) was an Iranian sculptor and painter and was known as Ostad Sadighi (English: Master Sadighi). He was a student and disciple of Kamal-ol-molk.

The statue of Ferdowsi in the Ferdowsi square, the statue of Khayyam in Laleh Park of Tehran, the statue of Nader Shah at his mausoleum in Mashhad, and the portrait of Abu-Ali Sina are all examples of his works.

== Biography ==
Abolhassan Sadighi was born in the Oudlajan neighbourhood of Tehran on 5 October 1894. His father, Mirza Bagher Khan Sadigoddoleh, was from the residents of Nur, Mazandaran; his mother, Malakeh Khanum, was a Qajar princess, known as "Shajan". His family had moved to Tehran years before the birth of Sadighi and settled in Oudlajan, which was, at the time, one of the high-class neighbourhoods of the capital. When he was seven, Sadighi went to Agdasiyyeh school, one of the new schools and was founded by Saeed-ol-Olama Larijani. After finishing elementary education, he went to Alliance School to continue his studies, but at the same time, he started painting without having any mentors; his paintings on the walls of the school incited grievances of the principals.

Although his aristocratic family sought other dreams for him and his father was not inclined for his son to follow painting, Sadighi's excessive interest in painting and designing made him quit studying in the last year of school and go to Kamal-ol-molk Ghaffari with his friend Ali Mohammad Heydaryan and get attend Ghaffari's class at his School of Fine Arts. After three years of studying, he achieved a high-class diploma in 1920 and started teaching students as a mentor at the same school. His outstanding protégé, Ali-Akbar San'ati, writes: "...[Sadighi] headlines in creating art so much that according to the deceased Esmail Khan Ashtiani, Lord Kamal-ol-molk often called him Mirza Abolhassan Khan the Rival for humor and encouragement!"

=== School of Fine Arts ===
A vague internal inclination pushed Sadighi to sculpture and while there was no sculpture mentor in Iran during the time and it was not taught anywhere including the School of Fine Arts, he formed a plaster statue of a child's half-trunk on 1922 by rudimentary tools and presented it to Ghaffari. By seeing the statue, the latter realized the talent of Sadighi, who was then one of the painting teachers of the school, and turned the greenhouse of the school to a sculpture workshop and Sadighi started gaining experience in sculpture while teaching painting and also learned about theoretical aspects of sculpture by reading the books Ghaffari had brought from Europe with him.

After he formed several plaster statues and earned the necessary skills in two to three years, he one day asked Ghaffari to make it possible for him to form a stone statue. Ghaffari initially disagreed and believed Sadighi's tools and experience insufficient, but eventually approved it and accepted the expenses of the stone. Sadighi began making Vénus de Milo's statue after seeing a picture of it and finally it was finally completed on 1925. After Ghaffari noticed the fantastic talent of his protégé, the former took the latter along with Milo's statue to Ahmad Shah and in that meeting, the shah gave Ghaffari 50 tomans, a large sum at the time, and designated a monthly salary of 20 tomans for Sadighi in order to ensure the progress and continuation of his career and Ghaffari left him in charge of the newly established sculpture workshop of the School of Fine Arts.

During that period, he formed many statues including: Ferdowsi's plaster statue, half-trunk and full stature statues of Farahani, Abolgasem (Ghaffari's serviceman), Elias the peddler, and the barber of the bath. The most prominent statue of that period, which was formed on 1926, is the Siyah-ney-zan (Haj Magbal) which was formed from patinated chalk and it is 93 centimeters high and is currently kept at National Arts Museum.

=== Departure to Europe ===
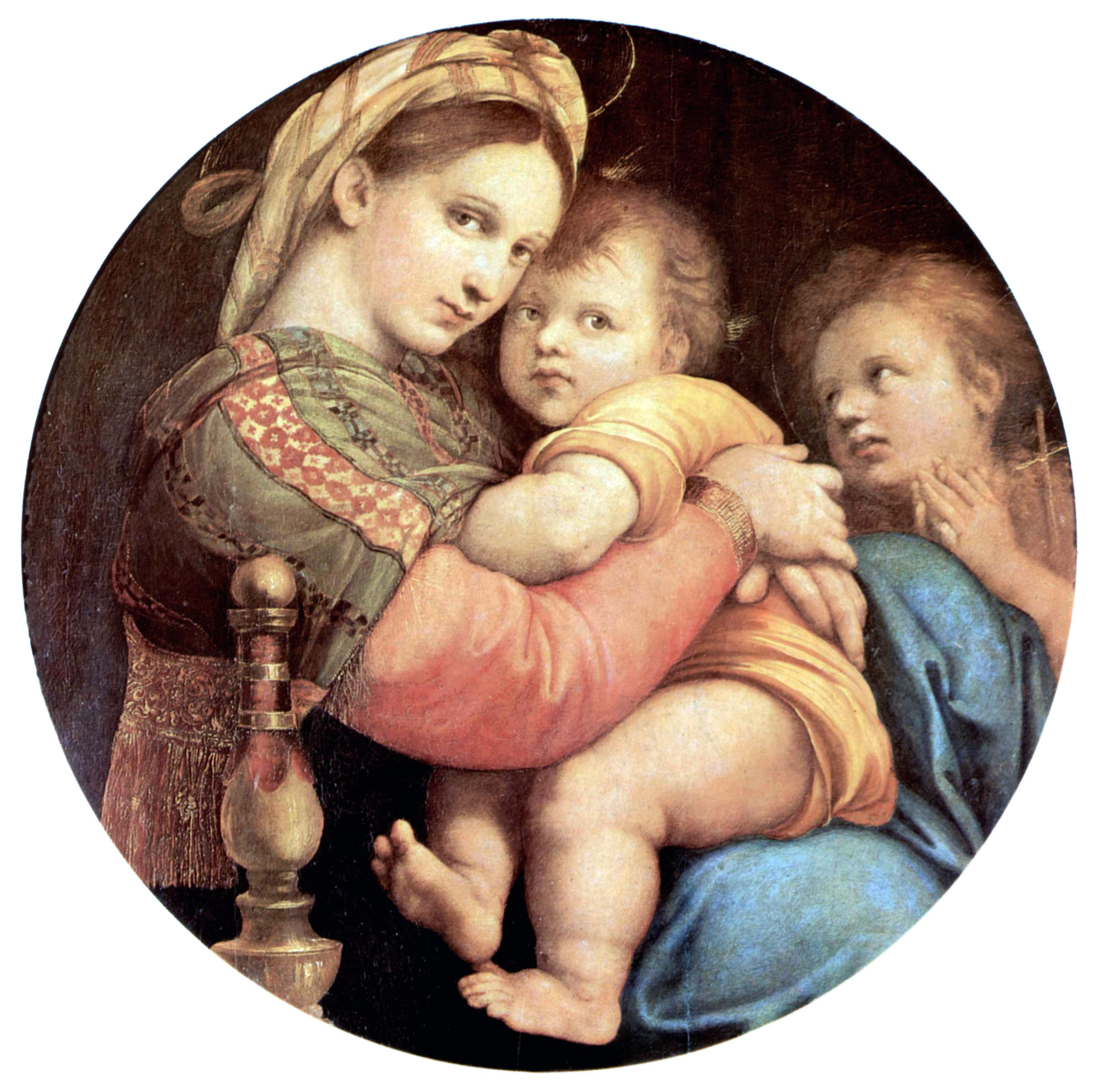
Madonna and the Christ by Raphael

1927 is the year Ghaffari quit from all of his posts and moved to Hoseynabad, Nishapur. During departure from Tehran, he suggested to Sadighi to go to Europe and pass his complementary education there, giving Sadighi the money he had saved from the salary coming from the shah. By the departure of the mentor, the protégés and teachers scattered and one year later on 1928, Sadighi went from Tehran to Astara and from there to Baku and Moscow and eventually France. He traveled across some European countries for some time and continued learning and gaining experience in sculpture and stone-cutting under Angealberr at Paris National Fine Arts High School for four years.

Sadighi, who was in Europe during the interwar period, spent most of his time painting. He produced 160 paintings in that period.

=== Return to Iran and marriage ===
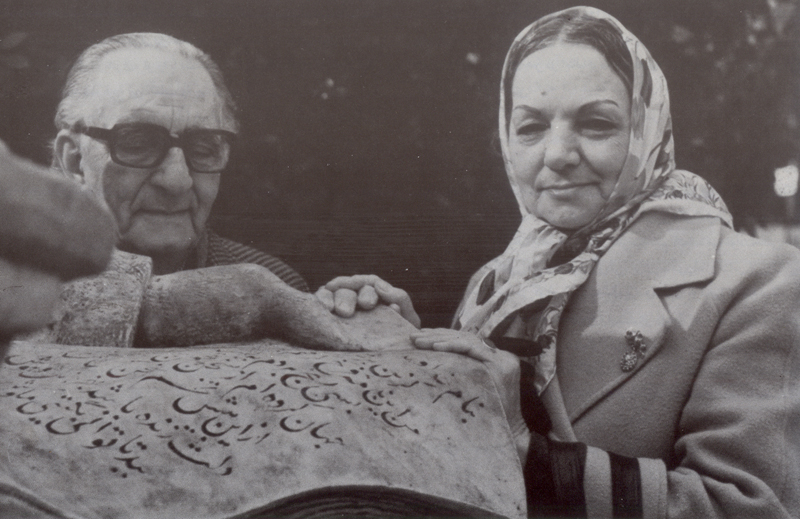
Sadighi and his wife, Qodrat-ol-saadaat Mirfenderesky in Ferdowsi Square beside the statue of Ferdowsi

Having gained a lot of experience, Sadighi returned to Iran in March 1934. In May 1934, he married his cousin Qodrat-ol-saadaat Mirfenderesky. Having gained permission from Ghaffari, who was in a self-imposed exile, and by the help of his friend and old classmate, Ali-Mohammad Heydaryan, he established the School of Fine Arts again. After Ghaffari's death in 1940, the school was closed for unknown reasons. But after a while, another school called Beautiful Arts was founded under the Ministry of Culture. After a while, Sadighi accepted to start teaching at that school. After the foundation of Tehran University, the school continued with the same name under it and the leadership of stone-cutting academy was given to Sadighi.

=== National Works Board ===
On 1950, Sadighi joined the National Works Board. During that time, he painted portraits of Iranian science and literature celebrities and formed remarkable statues of the celebrities. Portraits of Sa'di, Abu-Ali Sina, Ferdowsi, and Hafez are the result of that period.

Eventually, he retired from Tehran University in 1961, but devoted all his time and energy to sculpture. By traveling to Italy, he managed to form remarkable statues. The statue of Nader Shah and his assistant at Nader Shah's tomb in Mashhad and the statue of Ferdowsi at Ferdowsi Square of Tehran and the statue of Khayyam at Laleh Park of Tehran are the results of those years.

=== Final years ===
During the 1979 revolution, Khayyam's statue received critical damage and its face and fingers broke as a result of stones thrown at. On 11 February 1979, an unknown group decapitated Ferdowsi's statue, which was later repaired. During the revolution, Sadighi was working on Farahani's statue in Italy. The plaster model of the statue had been completed by the time the authorities of the new administration refused to pay the following expenses and the planned bronze statue was never formed. Sadighi returned to Iran after a while and spent his last years in silence and isolation. On 29 June 1992, his wife died. He died on 11 December 1995 at 101 years of age and was buried at the artists section of Behesht-e Zahra. After his death, memorial ceremonies were held. Also a statue of him was ordered to his son Fereydoon Sadighi, and the half-trunk statue is currently kept at the School of Beautiful Arts.

== Works ==
=== Statues ===
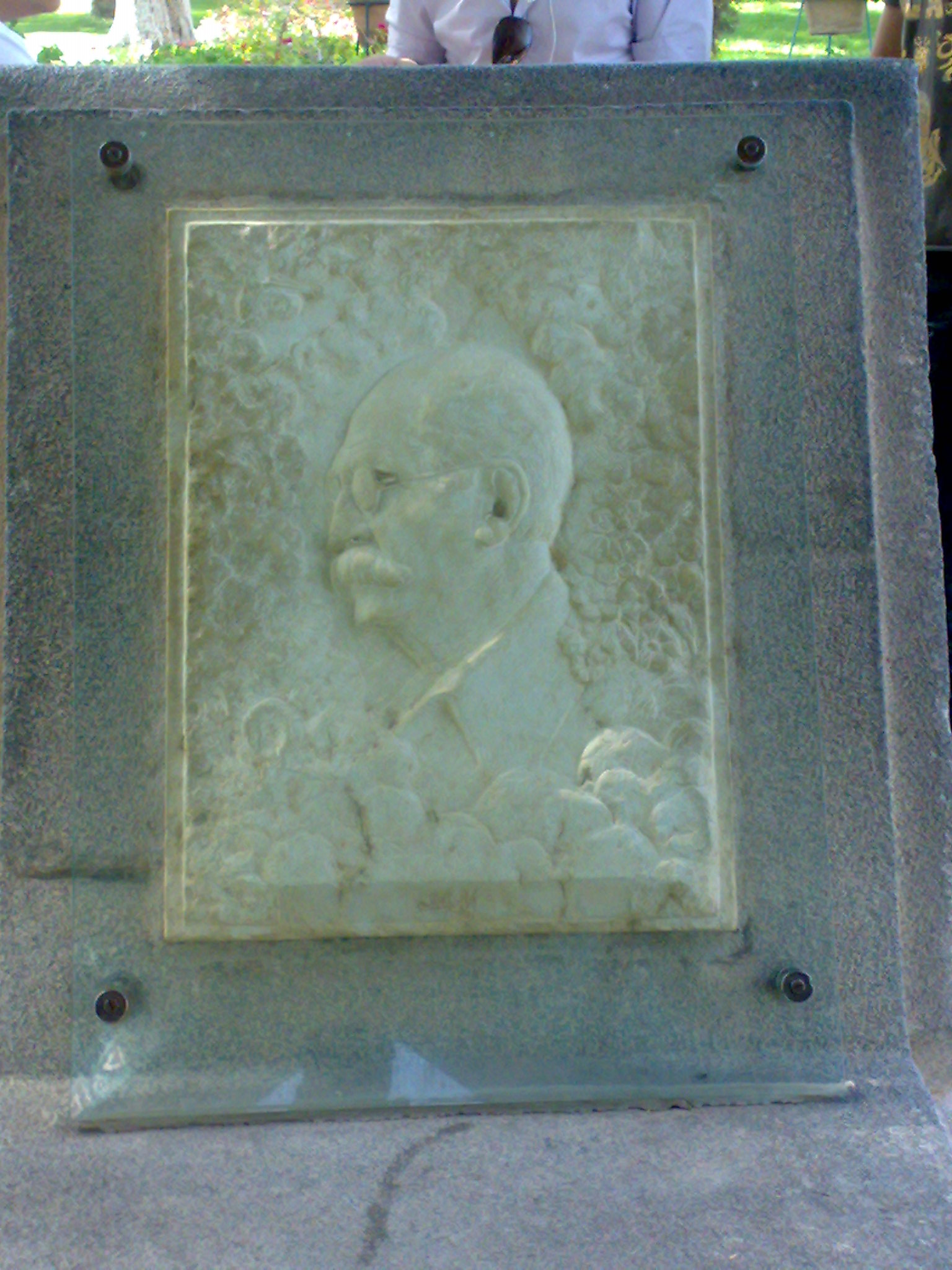
Projected picture on Ghaffari's mausoleum in Nishapur

Italian sculptor Gostinus Ambrosi writes in his diary after visiting Ferdowsi's statue in Villa Borgs of Rome:

Let the world know, I consider the creator of Ferdowsi's statue the second Michelangelo of the Orient. Michelangelo is once again born in the east.

Abolhassan Sadighi has collectively formed 83 statues, from which those having accurate information have been mentioned in this list; in addition he had sculpted statues of contemporary famous people, including Reza Shah, Mohammad Reza Shah and Taqizadeh (then representative of Majlis), Doctor Habibi (one of the directors of agriculture school), Bayat, Kashefossaltaneh (which is in Lahijan), Karim Sa'I, Imam-Quli Khan (governor of Fars at the time of Shah Abbas the Safavid) in the central square of Qeshm.

Year	Name	Material	Height (cm)	Location
1924	Half-trunk young girl	Chalk	20	Private collection
1926	Siyah-Ney-Zan (Haj Magbal)	Patinated chalk	93	National Arts Museum
1926	Half-trunk Haj Magbal	Patinated chalk	63	National Arts Museum
1928	Half-trunk young woman	Yazd marble	35	Private collection
1933	Half-trunk old man	Chalk	67	Private collection
1933	Half-trunk youth (Abolgasem)	Chalk	64	Private collection
1933	Half-trunk house servant (Naneh-Hosseyn)	Patinated chalk	30	Private collection
1933	Half-trunk old man	Yazd marble	51	Private collection
1933	Ferdowsi riding a Simurgh	Plaster	160	Destroyed
1934	Half-trunk Ferdowsi	Plaster	70	Destroyed
1938	Half-trunk Nader Shah	Yazd marble	70	Tus Museum in Mashhad
1940	His mother (Shajan)	Patinated chalk	33	Private collection
1942	Four Iranian Justices	White stone	90*180	Courthouse of Tehran
1943	Mirza Taqi Khan Farahani	Patinated chalk	220	Dar-ul-Funun school
1944	Lady Justice	Marble	220	Courthouse of Tehran
1946	Three stages from Ferdowsi's Shahnameh	Separi stone	430*85	Atop of the zoorkhaneh of Bank Melli Iran
1951	Sheikh Ajal Sa'di	Marble	285	Sa'di Square in Shiraz
1954	Abu-Ali Sina	Marble	285	Avicenna Mausoleum in Hamedan
1956	Nader Shah and his soldiers	Casting of burnt bronze	700	Nader mausoleum in Mashhad
1958	Half-trunk of his brother	Chalk	44	Private collection
1968	Profile of Ghaffari	Marble	65*60	Ghaffari's mausoleum, Nishabur
1968	Ferdowsi	Karara marble	185	Villa Borghese, Rome
1969	Ferdowsi	Karara marble	185	Tomb of Ferdowsi, Tus
1970	Half-trunk Khayyam	Karara marble	90	Khayyam's mausoleum, Nishabur
1971	Ferdowsi	Karara marble	300	Ferdowsi Square, Tehran
1975	Omar Khayyam	Karara marble	185	Laleh Park, Tehran
1976	Farahani	Plaster	225	Milan, Italy
1977	Riding Ya'gub Leith	Bronze	450	Central Square of Zabol
1978	Farahani	Bronze	?	Mellat Park, Tehran

=== Paintings ===
Sadighi has left remarkable works in painting and his portrayals of celebrities of classic Persian literature have made their reputations permanent. In addition, he has two paintings in the Saadabad Museum and has a large painting 7 meters long and 3 meters wide in Iranian Embassy in Paris. That is the portrait of first Iranian Ilchikhan (ambassador) in the court of Louis XVI.

In his years in Europe, in addition to painting European landmarks, he had copied paintings a lot similar to works of Raphael, Rembrandt, Rubens, Ingres,... in the Louvre Museum. Rubens's painting has been destroyed as a result of poor care, but his copy of the painting of Mary and Jesus by Raphael is in the possession of his son Fereydoon Sadighi. According to that artist: "It's a complete painting of a sourced girl, and since she is too nude, you can't show it everywhere!"

==== Portraits ====
Portrait of Abu-Ali Sina by a black pen on paper (in 1945) that is currently known as the official face of Abu-Ali Sina

Sadighi's portraits of Persian literature figures have grown popular as consolidated works, especially portraits of Abu-Ali Sina, Saadi and Ferdowsi. In order to portray Abu-Ali Sina's face, an expert group was formed in 1944 and designing the face was assigned to Sadighi. In May 1945, he designed a picture with a full face by a black pen and the picture was ratified at the 21st meeting of the National Works Board and it was printed on the Ibn-I Sina lottery papers. In January 1949, a profile of that full-face portrait was painted by Sadighi and was used in stamps, medals and other things. On the same year, a six-member group including Hooshang Seyhoun and Sadighi went to Hamadan to exhume Abu-Ali Sina's grave, and his skull was examined. After building a new mausoleum, Abu-Ali's remains were buried once more. After that, Sadighi was assigned by the National Works Board to form a statue of Abu-Ali Sina; it was formed in 1954 and is currently located at the city of Hamadan.

Year	Name	Type	Size
1930	Florence, Italy	Crayon on paper	20*30
1931	Paris	Ink on paper	16*24
1931	Florence	Black pen on paper	15*25
1931	Pier in Venice, Italy	Black pen on paper	15*20
1931	Dock in Venice	Black pen on paper	15*20
1945	Abu-Ali Sina	Black pen on paper	
1949	Profile of Abu-Ali Sina	Black pen on paper	48*35
1949	Saadi	Black pen on paper	48*35
1951	Young woman, Rome, Italy	Crayon on paper	21*21
1971	Hafez		70*110

==== Oil paint ====
Year	Name	Size
1924	Portrait of Naneh Hosseyn, Shajan's servant	32*40
1925	Portrait of his sister	46*55
1927	Copy of the painting of Mary and Jesus by Raphael	85*85
1927	Portrait of Mary, by both him and Ali Mohammad Heydaryan	30*45
1928	Letyan, around Tehran	33*50
1928	Ali ibn-Ali Talib	30*40
1928	The village in Damavand	33*50
1928	His youth	48*55
1930	His youth, Florence	18*27
1930	San Marcos square, Venice	34*41
1930	His youth, Venice	65*82
1930	A village beside River Seine, Paris	
1930	Himself in Venice	33*40
1930	A village near Florence	35*45
1930	Southern France	
1930	Himself in Marseille, France	55*70
1931	His youth	25*33
1931	A copy of a work by Rembrandt	35*56
1933	His spouse (incomplete)	53*70
1958	His residence in Rome	30*40
1960	Rome	62*84
1976	Rome	35*50

==== Watercolor ====
Year	Name	Size
1928	A church in Paris	12*29
1929	A park in Paris	22*30
1929	Outside Paris	38*52
1930	River Seine, Paris	22*30
1930	Venice, Italy	38*53
1930	Entrance of a canal, Venice	38*54
1930	A landscape beside Marseille, France	39*49
1930	Southern France	42*57
1930	A dock in Venice	21*29
1930	An old neighborhood in Paris	42*52
1930	Nature, Southern France	22*30
1930	A village near Paris	22*30
1930	Around Paris	22*29
1930	Around Paris	39*51
1930	An old neighborhood in Paris	22*30
1930	An old neighborhood in Paris	41*46
1930	An old neighborhood in Paris	42*52
1931	A church in Venice	22*30
1931	Venice	22*30
1931	San Marcos, Venice	38*54
1931	A harbor in Venice	38*54
1931	A bridge on Seine	42*52
1931	An old neighborhood in Paris	42*52
1931	Seine	42*52
1931	Venice	38*54
1931	Seine	42*52
1931	An old neighborhood in Paris	38*54
1931	Southern France	38*54
1931	San Marcos	22*30
1931	A church in Paris	15*25
1951	A bridge and a canal in Venice	21*29

=== Destroyed works ===
- 1925 – the stone statue of Vènus de Milo, the first stone statue made by Saighi. It was presented to Ahmad Shah and was never found later.
- 1933 – the plaster statue of Ferdowsi riding the Simurgh (aided by Hasan-Ali Vaziri). Height: about 160 centimeters.
- 1934 – plaster half-trunk Ferdowsi. Height: 70 centimeters.
- Full stature of Malekolmotakallemin from marble. It was situated in Park Shahr until 1999 and was transferred to the warehouse of the Parks Agency afterwards. In June 2006, the statue was announced missing.

== See also ==
- Islamic art
- Iranian art
- Islamic calligraphy
- List of Iranian artists
