= Nasrollah Hekmat =

Iranian philosopher

Nasrollah Hekmat is an Iranian philosopher and professor of philosophy at the Shahid Beheshti University.

Hekmat first studied at a hawza, where he attained the highest level of Islamic studies. In 1980, he left the hawza and began studying philosophy. In 1994, Hekmat received his Ph.D. in Western Philosophy.

Hekmat's thought has been Influenced by Iranian and European philosophers including Avicenna, Al-Farabi, Sohrevardi, Ibn Arabi, Max Scheler and Kant. Recurring themes in his work include a critique of logical thinking, a gnostic approach to philosophy, and existentialism.

== Selected publications ==
All works in Persian.

- 1997 A hesitation about the philosophy of reason's history
- 2002 What's a question?!
- 2006 Philosophy of Ameri neishabouri
- 2008 The art and wisdom in the Ibne Arabi's philosophy
- 2009 Farabi
- 2010 Metaphysics of Wonder
- 2011 Avicena's metaphysic
