= Laleh Park =

Park in Tehran, Iran

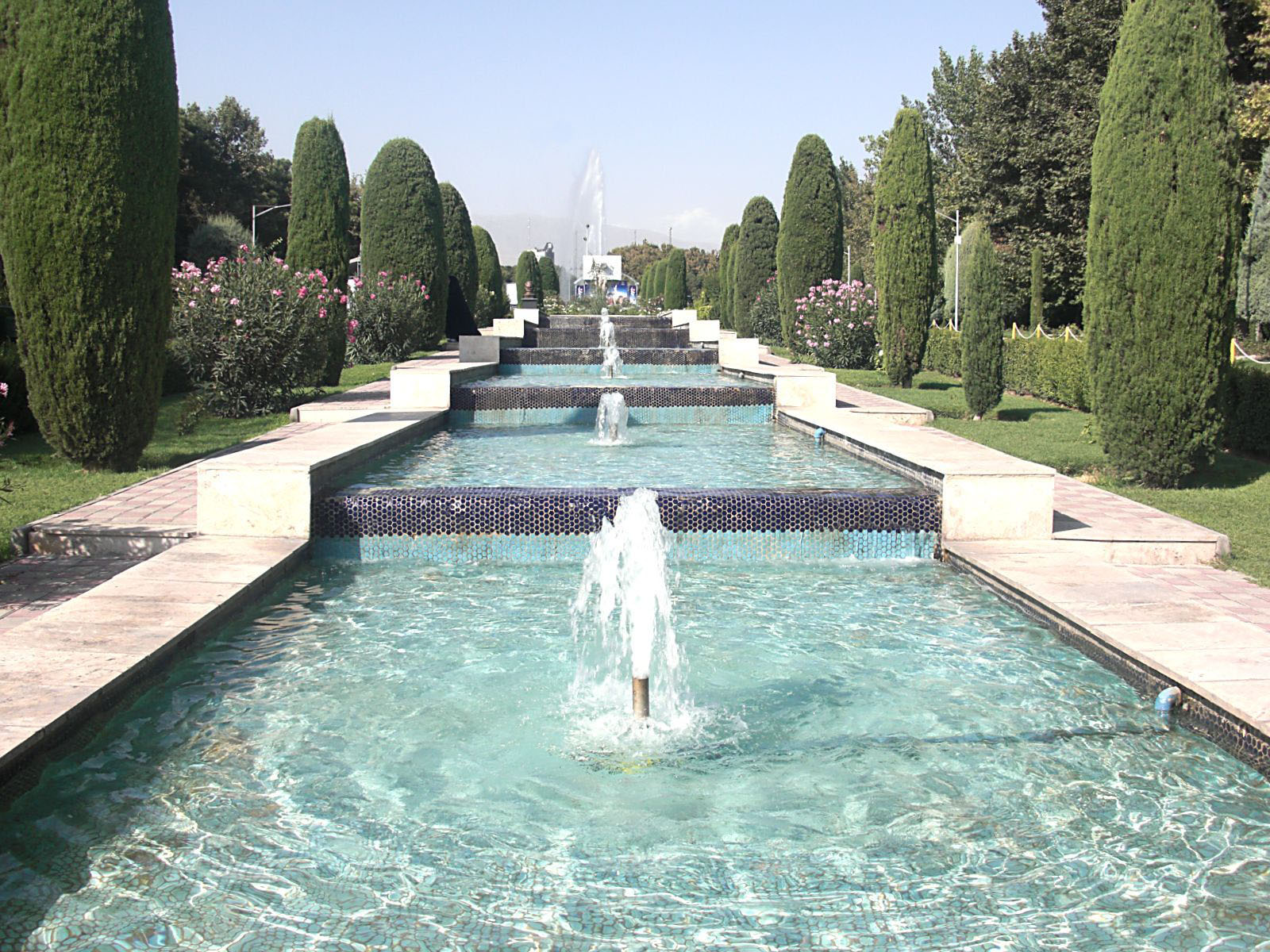
- Interactive map of Laleh Park
- Type: Municipal Park and Natural Area
- Location: Tehran, Iran
- Area: 86.4869 acres (35.00 ha)
- Created: 1966
- Founder: Farah Pahlavi
- Operator: Municipality of Tehran
- Status: Open all year
- Website: www.tehran.ir

Laleh Park (Persian: پارک لاله, romanized: Pârk-e Laleh), formerly called Farah Park after Farah Diba, is a large recreation area in Tehran, Iran. Laleh (لاله) is the Persian word for tulip, which is also a popular symbol in Iranian culture.

The park (one of c. 800 parks in Tehran) lies north of University of Tehran in the city centre. It is one of the largest parks in Tehran.

== Gallery ==
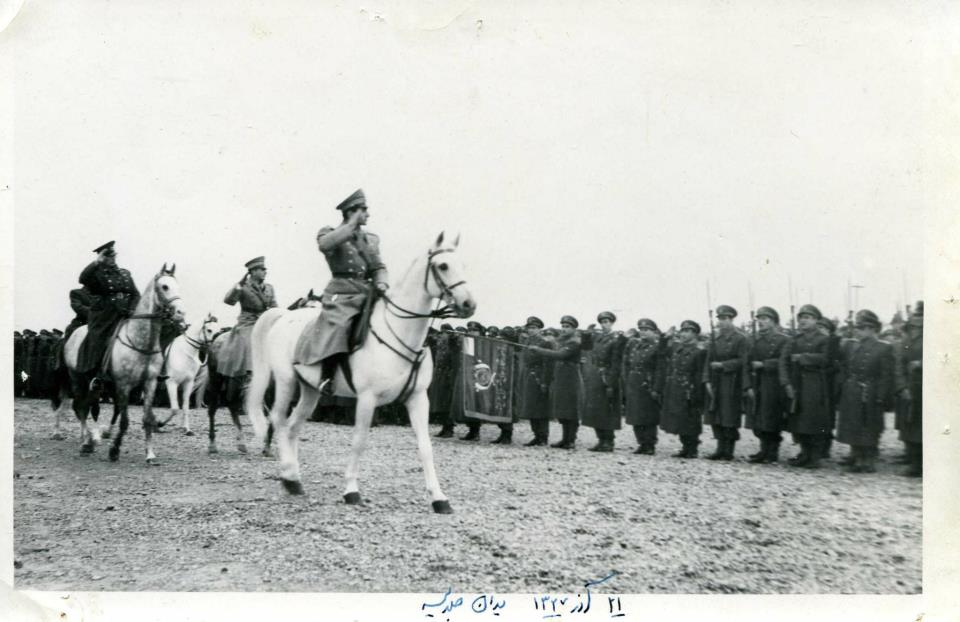
Mohammad Reza Pahlavi at the location of Laleh Park, 1948

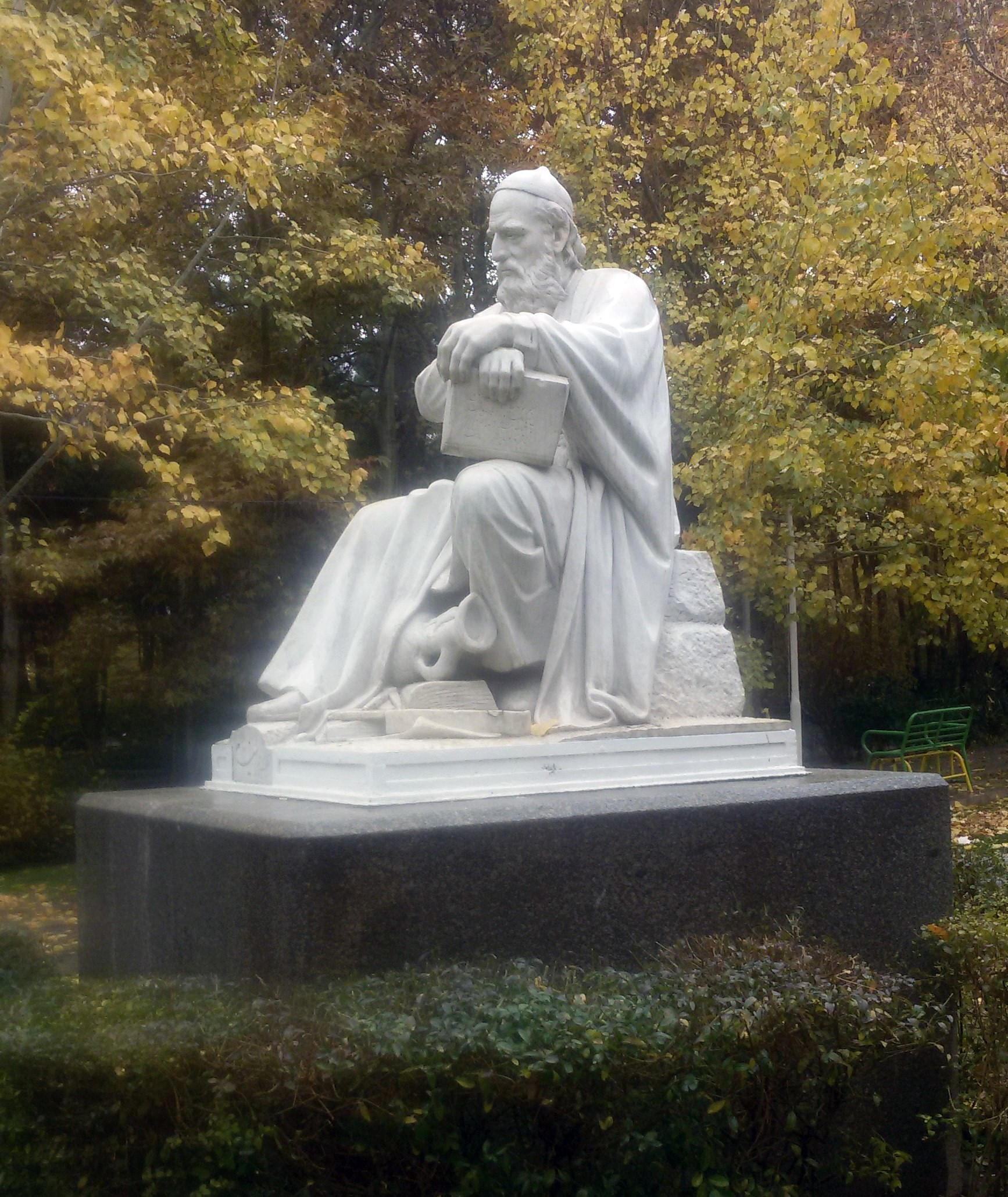
Statue of Omar Khayyam by Abolhassan Sadighi at Laleh park

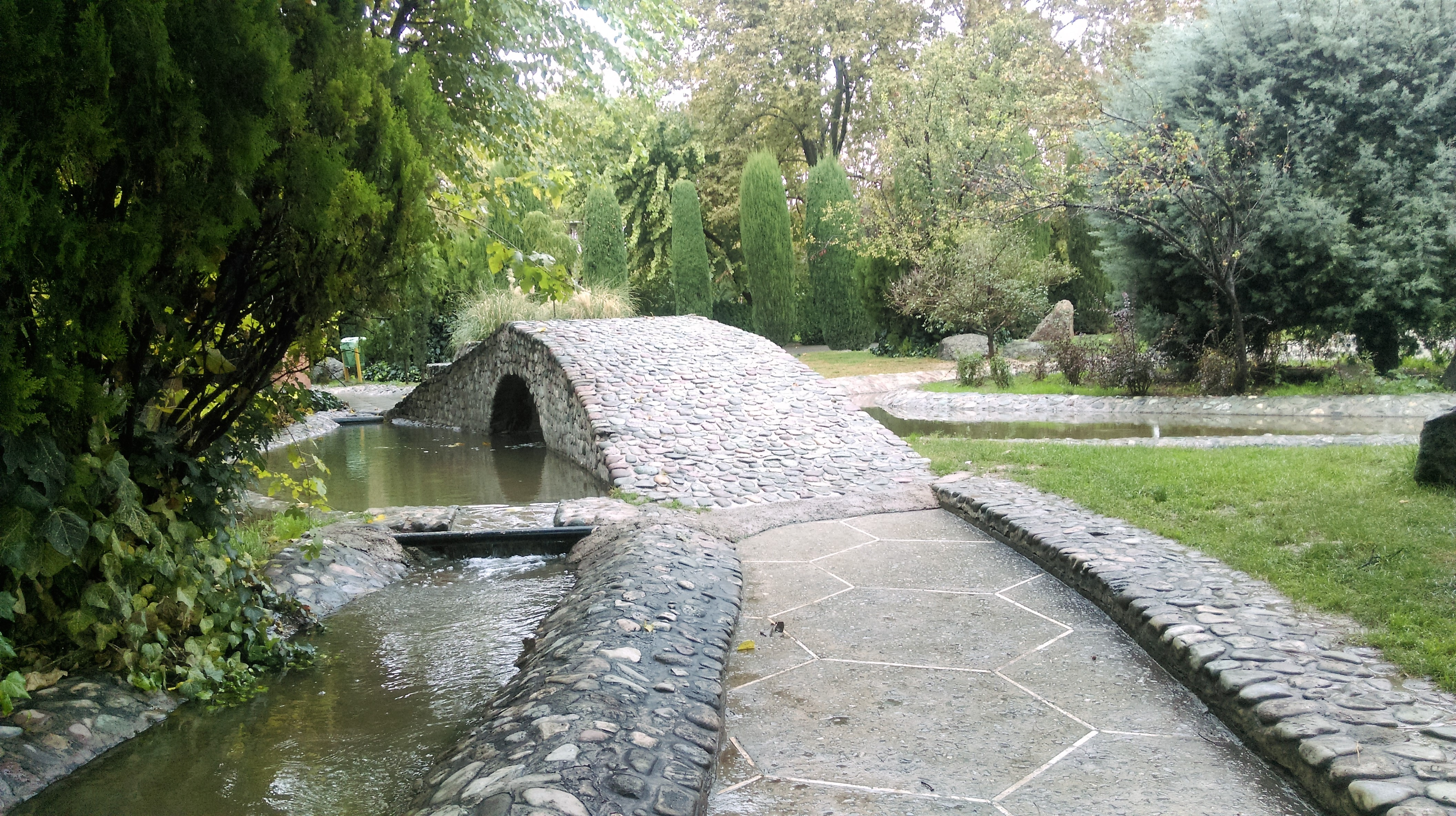

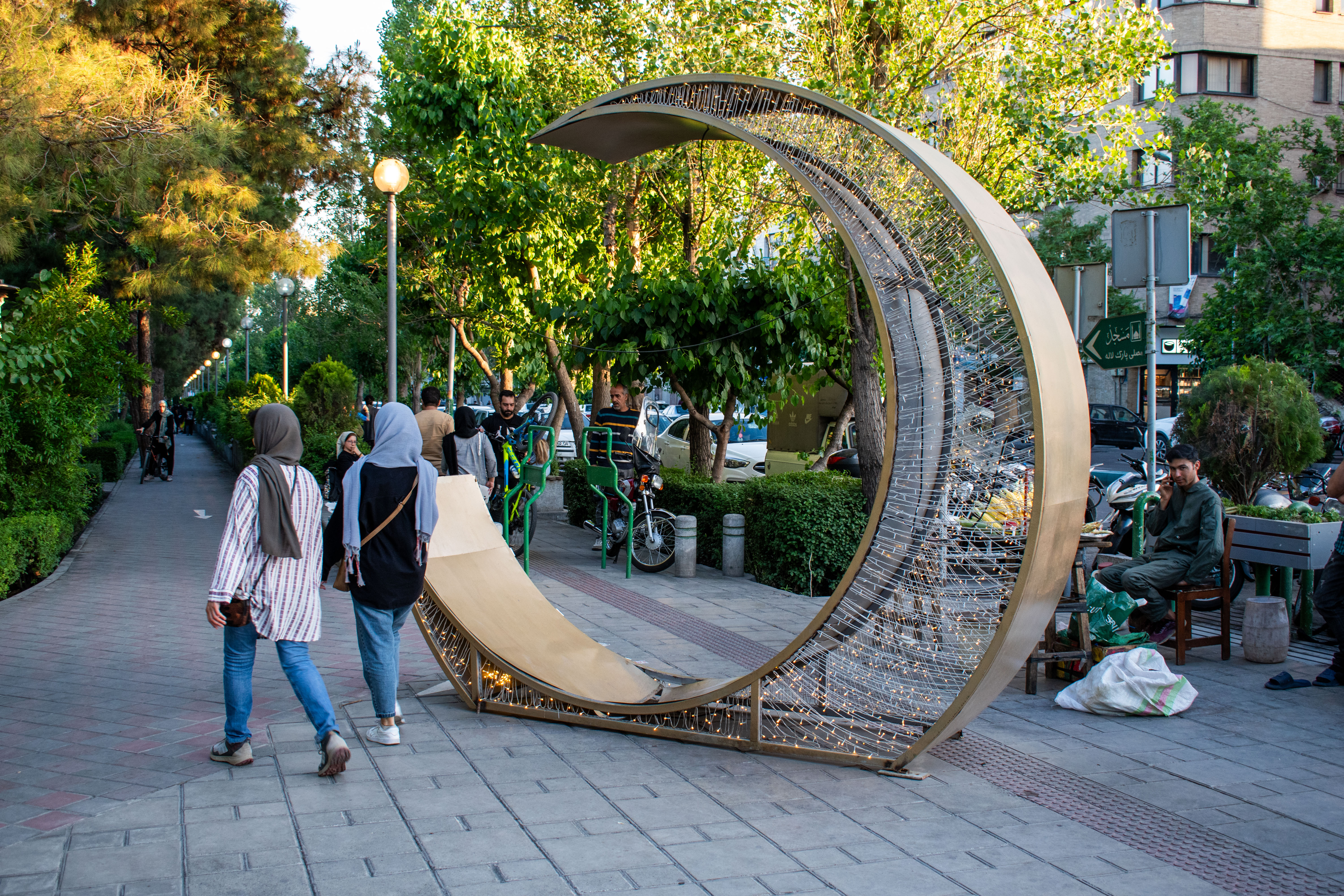

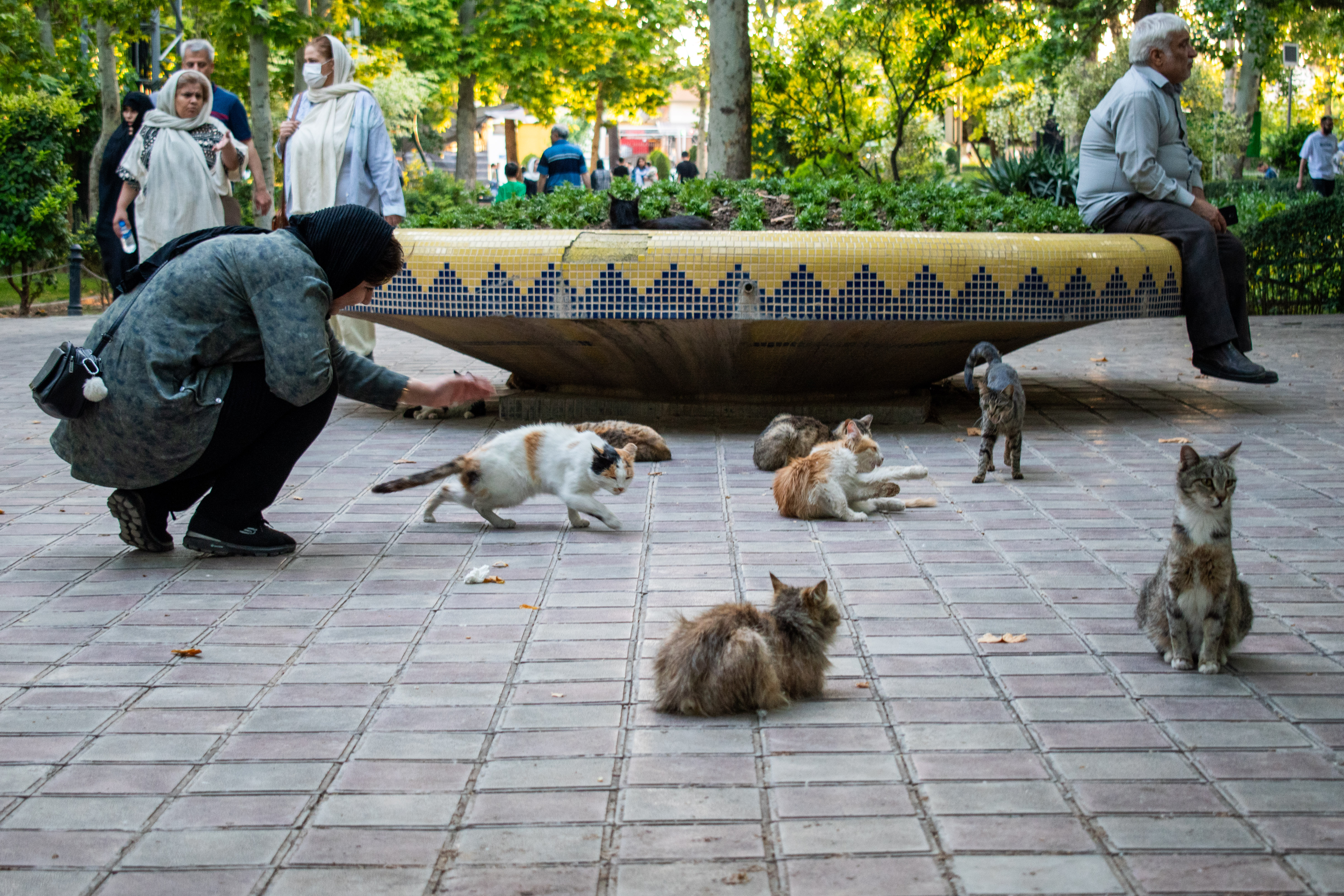

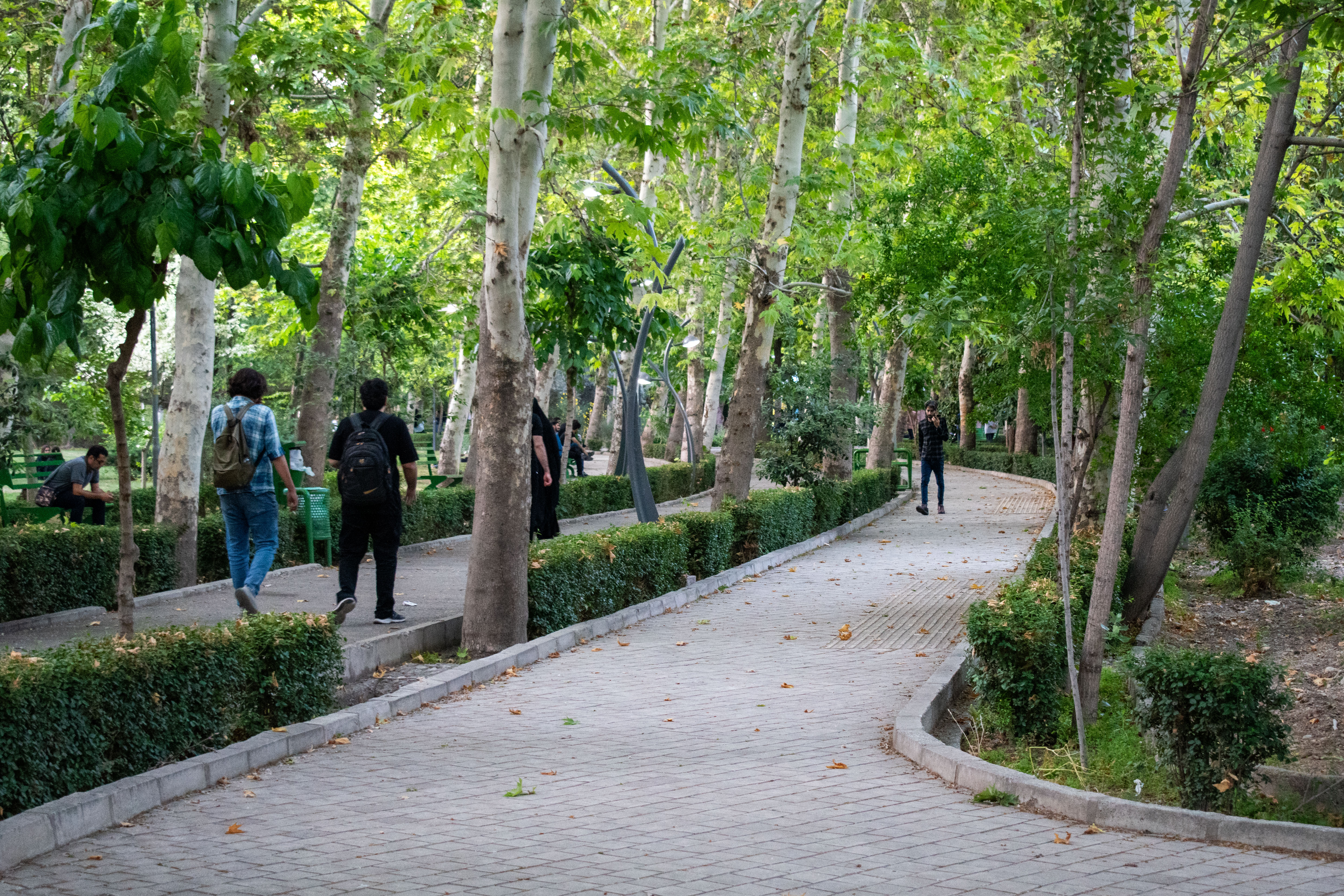

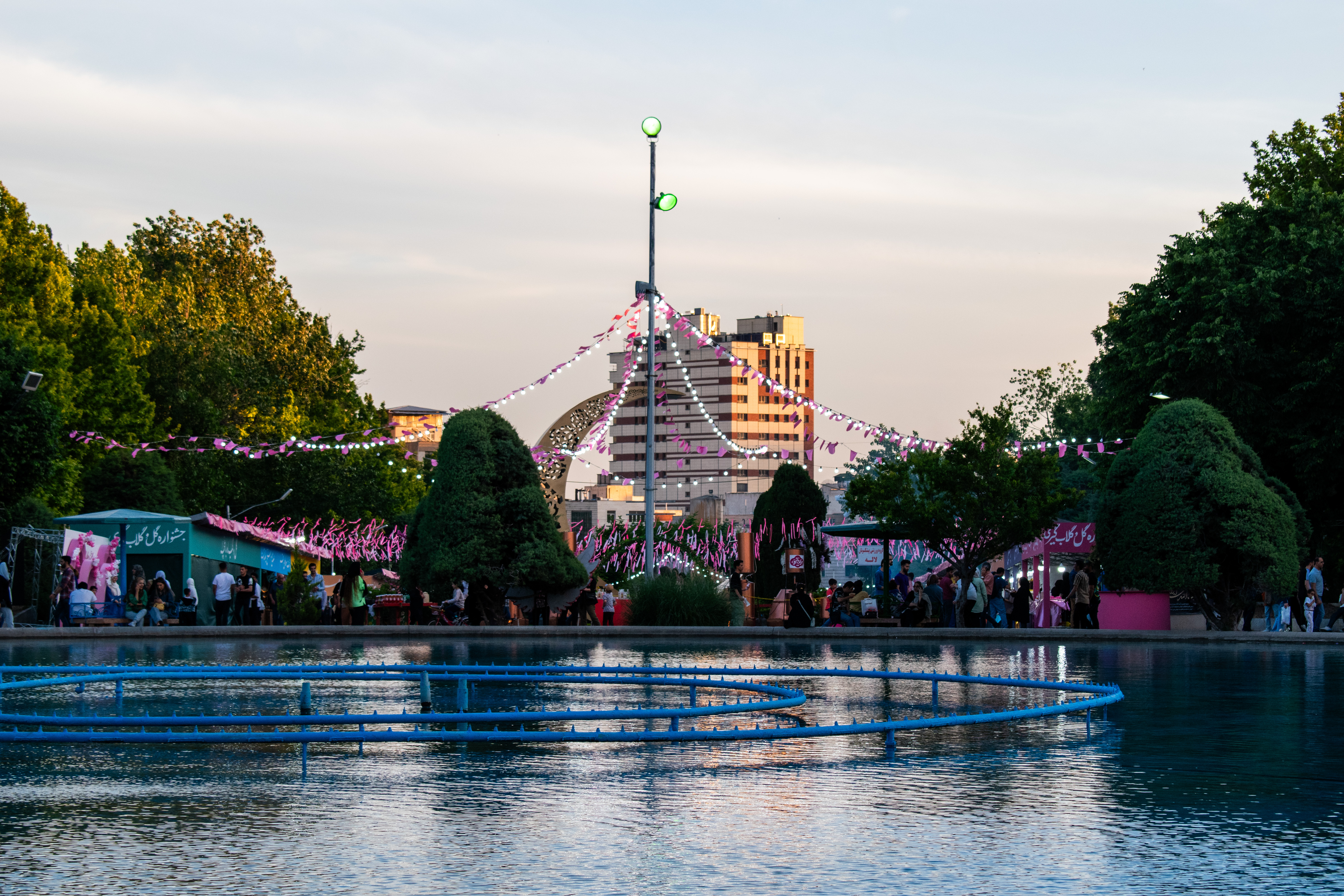

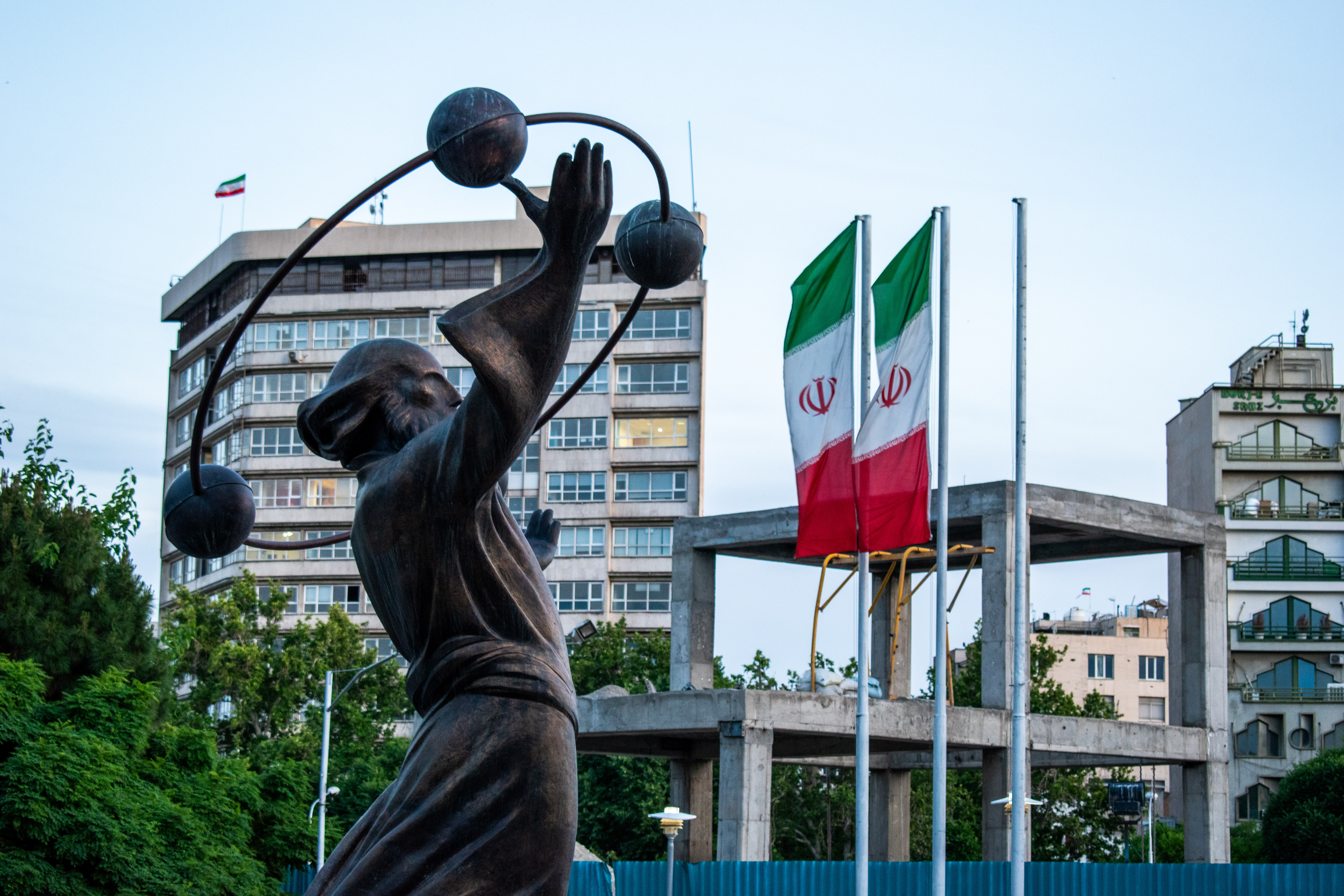

== See also ==
- List of Tehran's parks
