= Ahmad Khatami (professor) =

Iranian academic

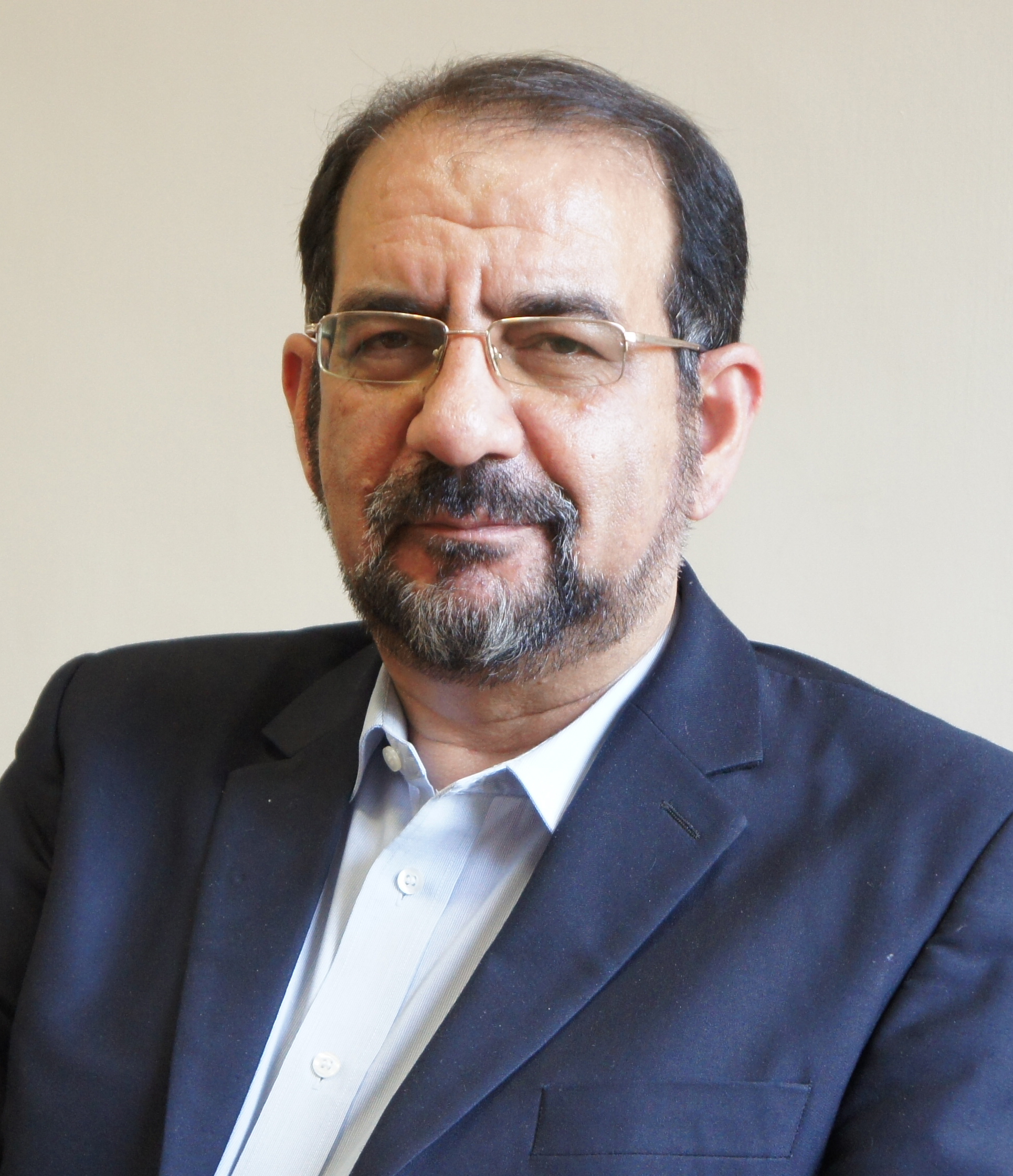
- Born: Ahmad Khatami; 1956 (age 69–70); Shahr-e Ray, Iran

Academic work
- Discipline: Persian language and literature

Ahmad Khatami (Persian: احمد خاتمی; born 1956 in Shahr-e Ray, Tehran province, Iran) is a professor of Persian language and literature, a lecturer at the Department of Persian Language and Literature, and the head of the Center of Excellence of Persian Literary History at Shahid Beheshti University in Iran.
