= Iraj Etesam =

Iranian architect (1931–2022)

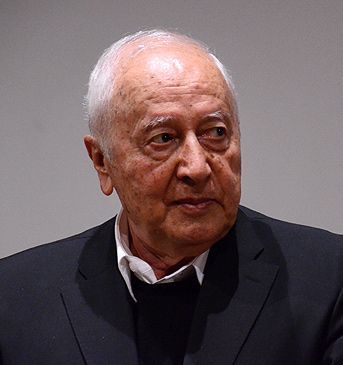
- Etesam in 2014
- Born: 21 January 1931; Gorgan, Iran
- Died: 19 December 2022 (aged 91)
- Education: University of Florence
- Known for: Architecture

Iraj Etesam (Persian: ایرج اعتصام; 21 January 1931 – 19 December 2022) was an Iranian contemporary architect, educator, and author. He was the designer and architect of the Mellat Park of Tehran and the Cyrus Park, as well as a professor of architecture in Iran.

== Biography ==
=== Early life and education ===
Iraj Etesam, was born on 21 January 1931 in Gorgan, Iran. He held a PhD in Architecture from the University of Florence in 1960.

=== Career ===
Etesam was the United Nations Regional Planning Master from 1971, and had been a member of the Official Judicial Courts of Experts from 1973.

Etesam was the founder and managing director of Omco Consulting Engineers, Tehran University of Architecture and Urban Planning, senior consultant and researcher for OMCO Consulting Engineers and Ducatiids International Institute.

Etesam's projects include Shah Cheragh, Shiraz-Paredesh University of Sistan and Baluchestan-Park, Tehran / New Town of Latian, Tehran- Mahallat Touring Sets, Sarein Ardebil, Lahijan- Initial Design of Saint Tropez, Southern France-Residential Complexes And villa houses in Seattle, San Jose, San Francisco, Los Angeles, US – A collection of seven office blocks in Bellville, Washington – the construction of Hajjis in Madinah, Monroe, Saudi Arabia, and so on.

His work also includes the translation of the book of the Eagle of Two Heads, from the Past to the Future of the Human Resource by Constantine Daxpadis, in 1998, the translation of the book of Islamic Architecture, Form, Performance and Meaning of Robert Hillenbrand, 1998, and numerous articles in domestic specialized journals. Foreign and ... pointed out.

=== Memberships ===
Etesam was a member of the board of trustees at the Architectural Association of Iranian Architects.

Etesam was a member of the Tehran Building Engineering Organization; the International Federation for Housing and Planning in The Hague, Netherlands; the International Association of Housing Sciences in Miami, Florida; the International community of Aktis-Ticks in Athens, Greece; International Association for the Study of Traditional Environments (IASTE) in Berkeley, California; and the Association of Architects and the American Association of Students.

=== Teaching experience ===
Etesam had teaching roles which have included associate professor at the National University of Tehran (now known as Shahid Beheshti University, 1960–1964); associate professor at the University of Tehran (1961–1967); the head of the technical office of the Faculty of Fine Arts, University of Tehran (1963–1968). He was a visiting professor at the University of Washington (1972, 1981–1985), in Seattle; a researcher at the Center for Urban Studies at the University of California, Berkeley (1978–1979), and a lecturer at the University of California, Berkeley (2000–2001).

== Architectural projects ==
Project management and design:

- Shah Cheragh complex, Shiraz, Iran
- Campus of Sistan University and Baluchestan University, Iran
- Mahallat Tourism Complex, Sarein Ardebil, Lahijan, Iran
- Caspian Sea Coastal and Regional Planning, Iran
- Master Plan of Shiraz, Kazeroon, Zanjan, Sari, Gorgan in Iran
- Prototype of the Saint-Tropez complex, Saint-Tropez, France
- Hajjis construction complex in Madinah, Mumbai, Saudi Arabia
- Reconstruction of the permanent representation of Iran at the United Nations – New York

And more than a dozen residential and office complexes.

== Collected works ==
- The translation of the book of the Eagle of the Two Heads, from the Past to the Future of the Human Settlement by Constantine Daxpadis, Mullin Jam Publication 1998
- The translation of the book of Islamic architecture, form, function and meaning of the work of Robert Hillenbrand, Procurement Publication and Urban Planning of Tehran Municipality 1998

Multiple articles in domestic and foreign specialised journals.
