= Tehran Waterfall Park =

Park in Tehran, Iran

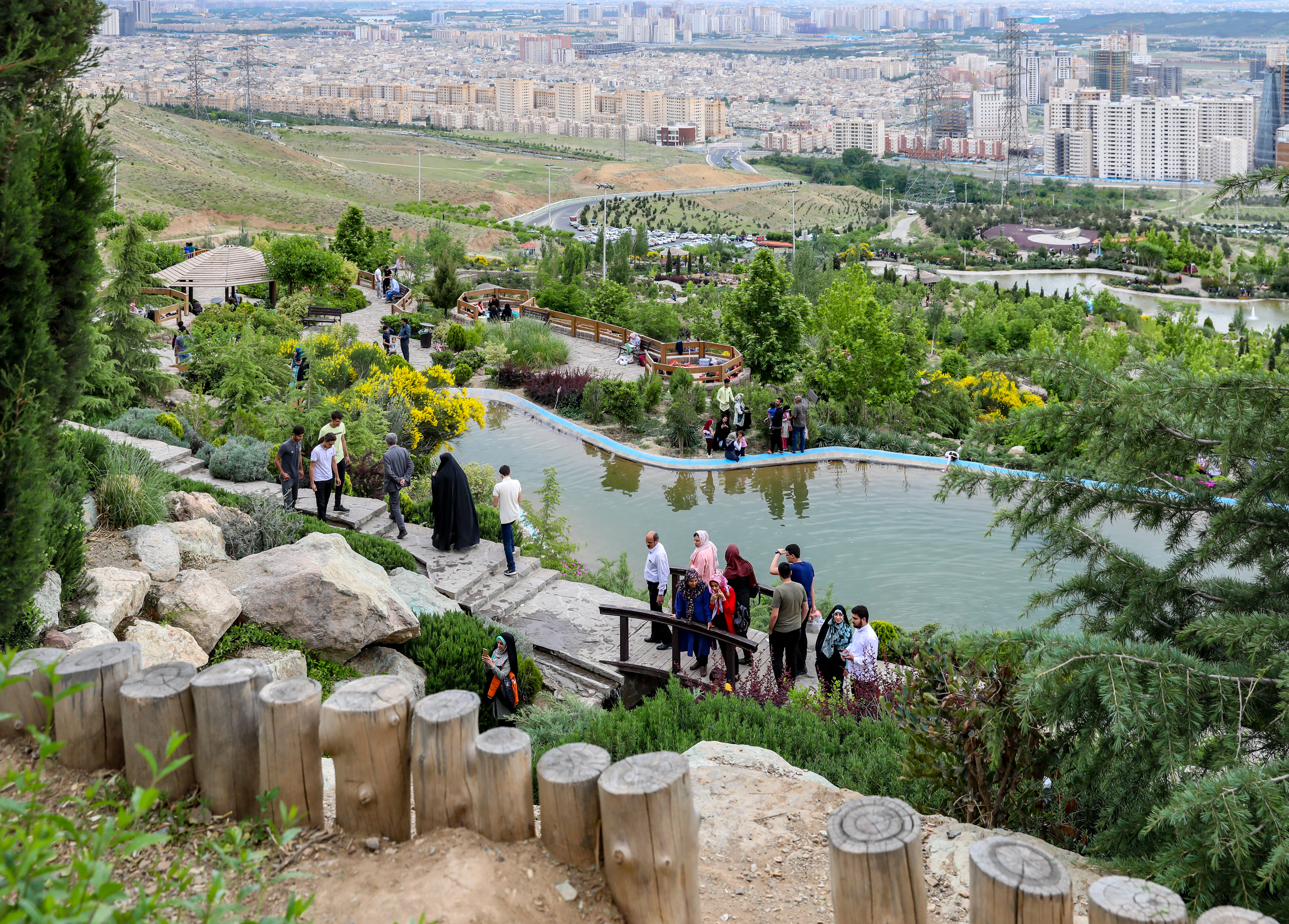
- Interactive map of Tehran Waterfall Park
- Type: Public park
- Location: Tehran, Iran
- Coordinates: 35.76598°N 51.21867°E
- Area: 200 hectares (2.0 km^{2}; 0.77 sq mi)
- Created: 2011

Tehran Waterfall Park (Persian: پارک آبشار تهران, romanized: Pārk-e Ābshār-e Tehrān) is a public park located in the northern heights of Tehran, Iran, overlooking Chitgar Lake. The park surrounds a waterfall and is built in tiers, with each tier featuring a pavilion and artificial pond. The park also has a mosque, playground, cafe, stone gazebos, and a 25 km (16 mi) hiking trail.

== Gallery ==
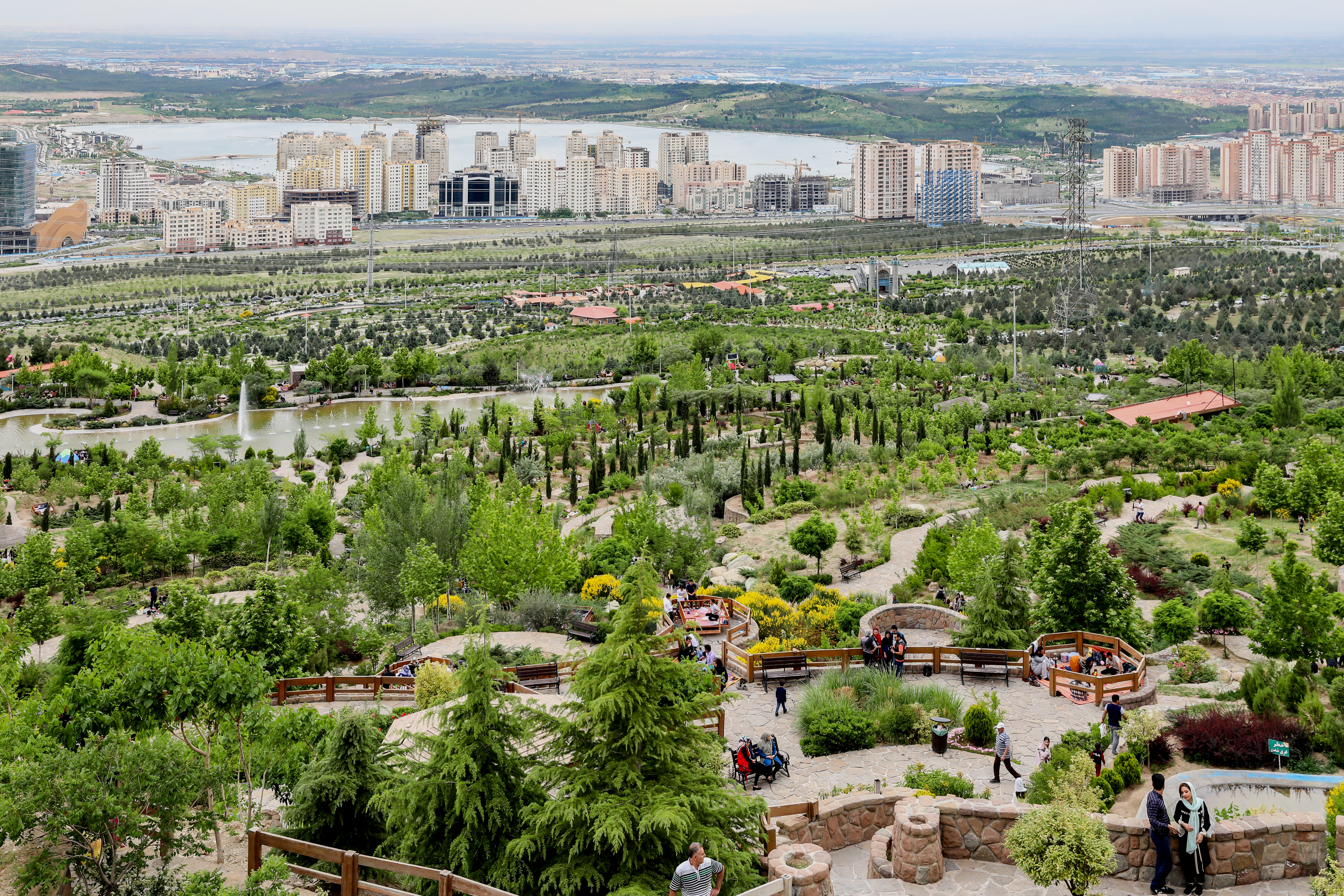

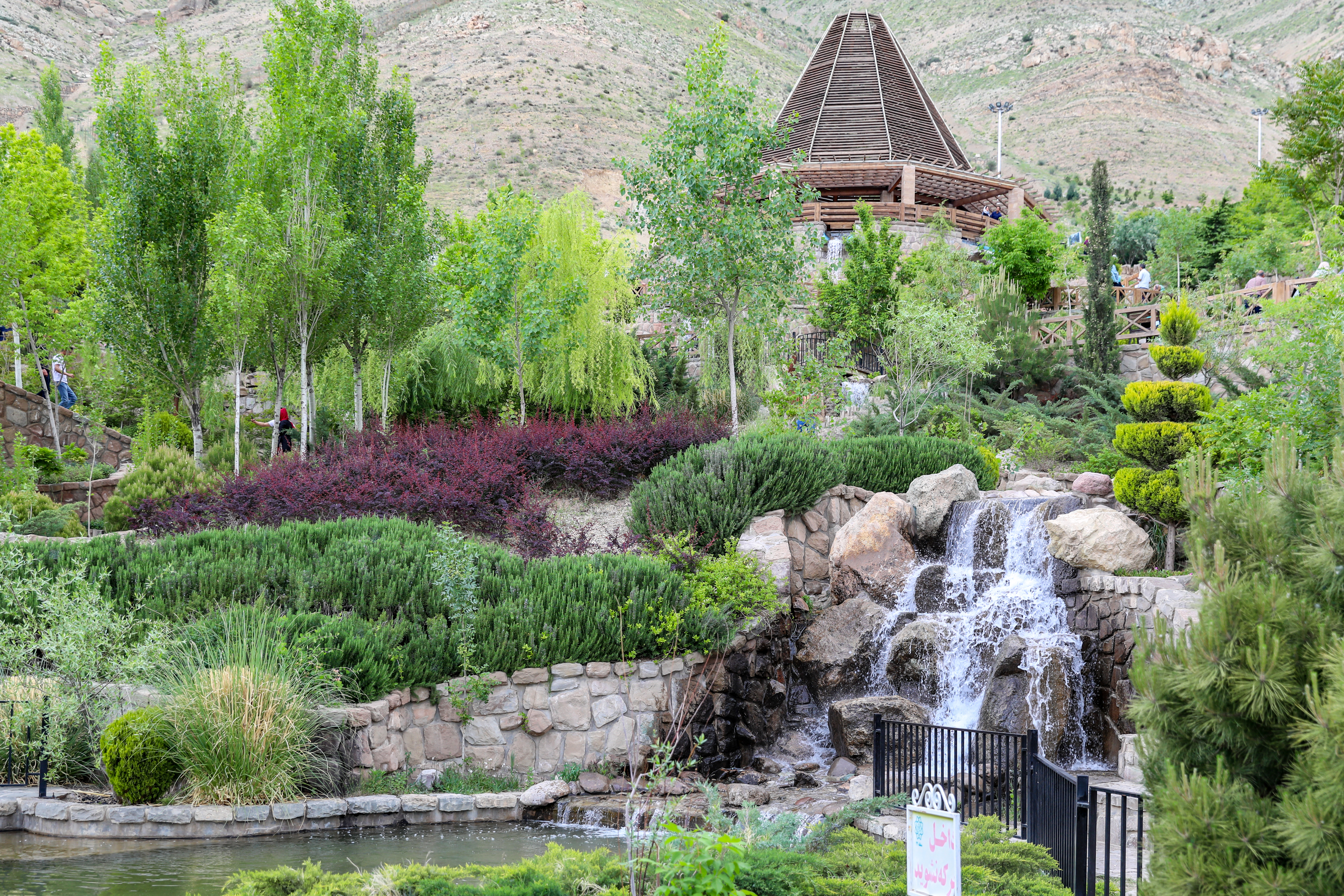

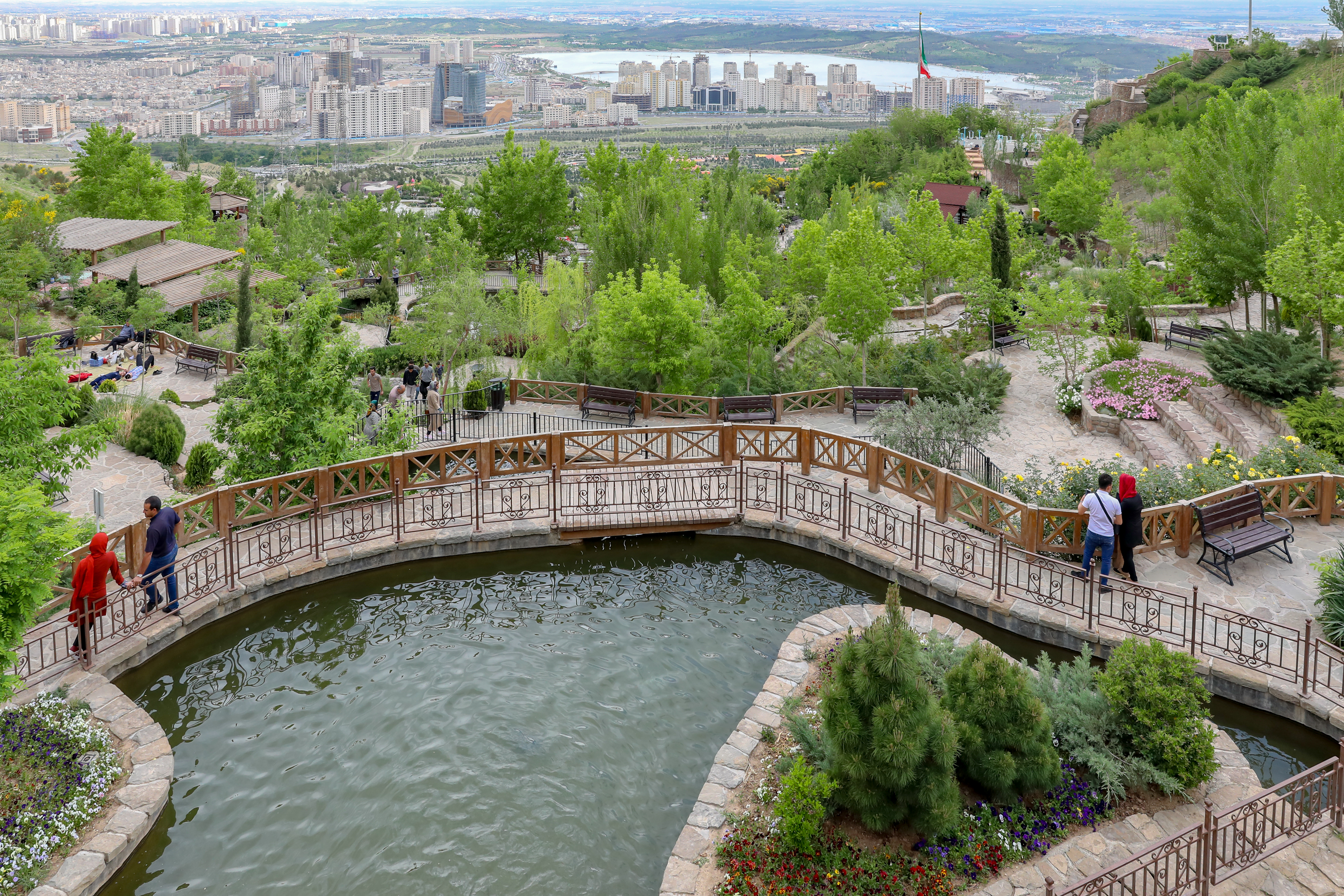

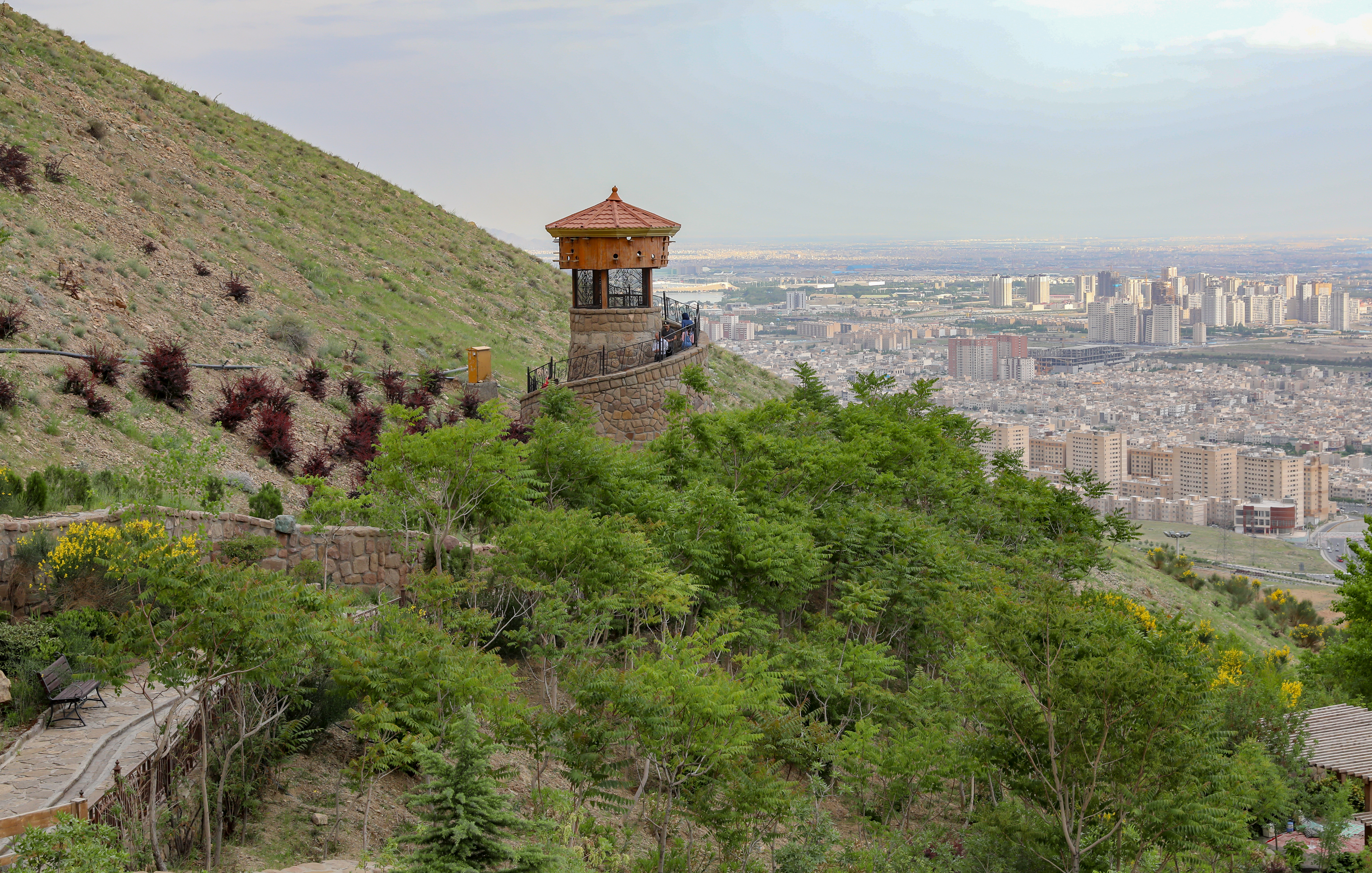
