= Shahid Beheshti University =

Public university in Iran

- دانشگاه شهید بهشتی
- Former names: National University of Iran (1960–1983)
- Motto: Persian: زندگی یعنی امید و حرکت
- Motto in English: "Life means hope and movement"
- Type: Public research university
- Established: 20 March 1960; 66 years ago
- Founders: Mohammad-Reza Shah; Ali Sheikh ol-Eslam
- Budget: IRR 26,570 billion (2025/26)
- President: Mahmoud-Reza Aghamiri
- Academic staff: ~900 (2025/26)
- Students: 19,153 (2025/26)
- Undergraduates: ~7,500 (2025/26)
- Postgraduates: ~11,500 (2025/26)
- Location: Tehran, Iran; 35°48′08″N 51°23′36″E
- Campus: 60 hectares (150 acres); Urban
- Colours: Dark blue White
- Website: sbu.ac.ir

Shahid Beheshti University (Note: Persian: دانشگاه شهید بهشتی) is a public research university located in Tehran, Iran. Founded in 1960 as the National University of Iran, (Note: Persian: دانشگاه ملی ایران) it has 3 campuses, 19 faculties, 10 research institutes and 9 research centres, and is situated on a 60-hectare land in the Evin neighborhood in northern Tehran.

== History ==
Shahid Beheshti University has been sanctioned by governments in the EU, US, Australia, Canada, and Switzerland for their links to Iran's nuclear program. This restricts business and financial transactions with the university, in some cases including its students.

== Campuses ==
- Main campus: Located in Evin District, it extends into Velenjak District in northwestern Tehran, on approximately one million square meters.
- Abbaspour College of Engineering and Technology (ex-Power and Water University of Technology) is in Tehranpars, Tehran

== Faculties ==
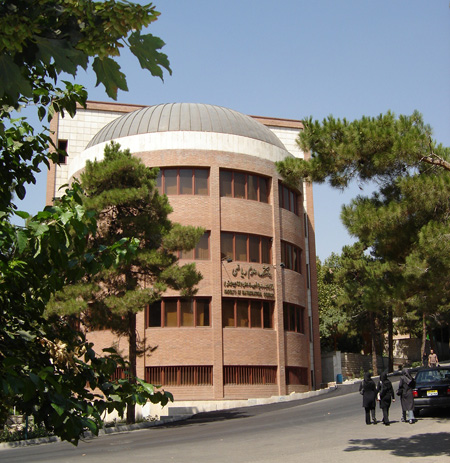
Department of Mathematical Sciences

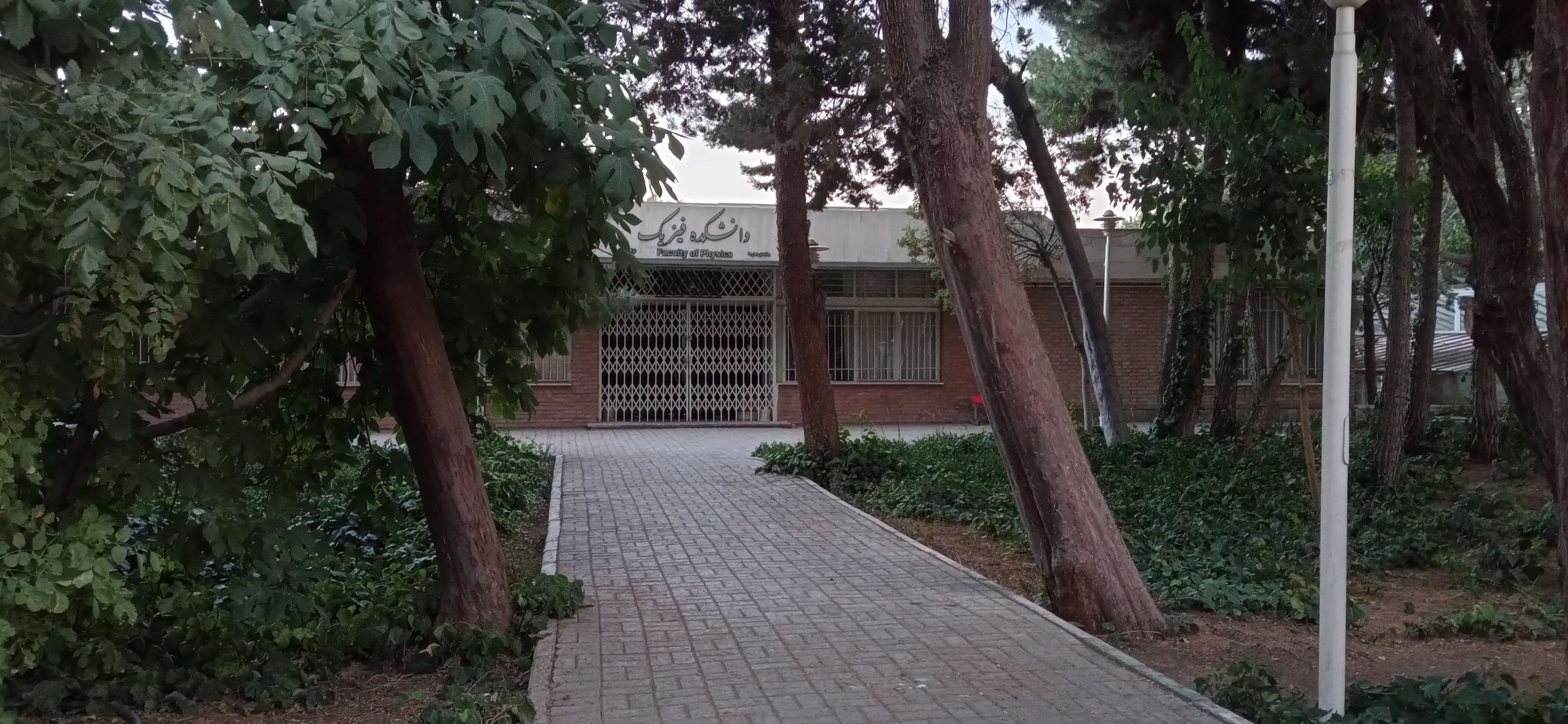
Faculty of Physics

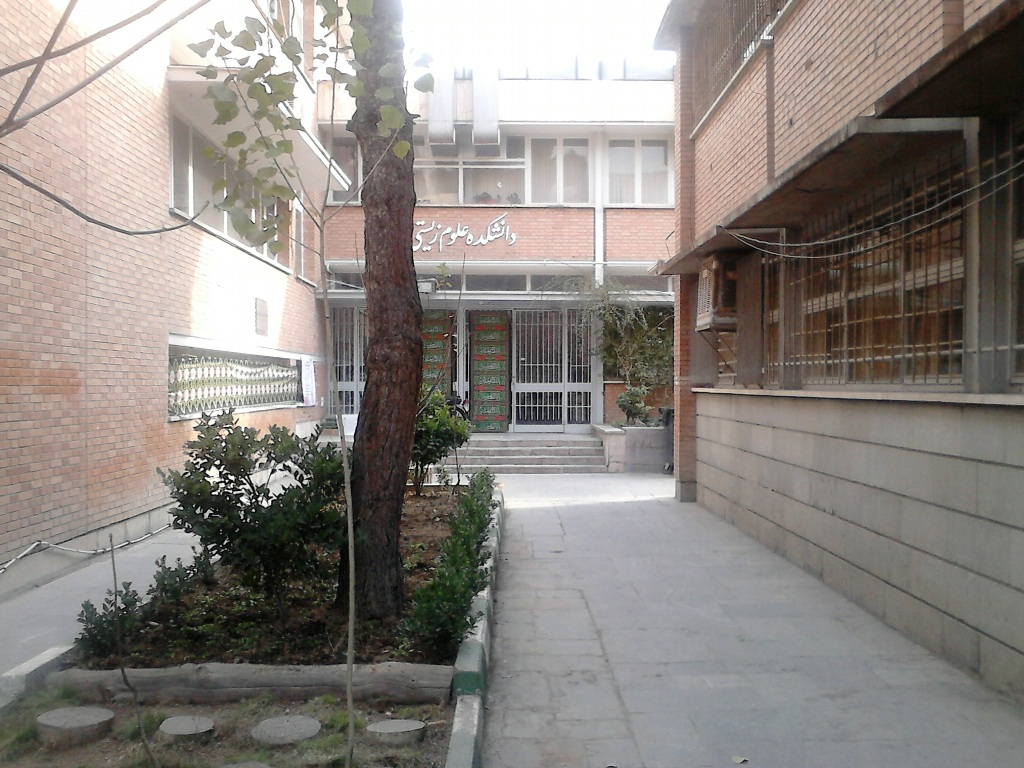
School of Biological Sciences

- Faculty of Electrical Engineering: Department of Telecommunication, Department of Electronics, Department of Systems and Control, Department of Power
- Faculty of Computer Engineering and Science: Department of Software Engineering & Information, Department of Artificial Intelligence and Robotics, Department of Computer Architecture and Networks
- Faculty of Mechanical Engineering and Energy
- Faculty of Architecture & Urban Engineering: Department of Architecture: Department of Landscape Architecture, Department of Construction, Department of Design, Department of Reconstruction, Department of Urban Planning
- Faculty of Business & Management: Department of Public Management, Department of Business Management, Department of Commercial Management, Department of Financial Management, Department of Industrial Management, Department of Entrepreneurial Management, Institute for Research
- Faculty of Biological Sciences: Department of Biology, Department of Genetics, Department of Marine Biology, Department of Microbiology, Department of Plant Sciences, Department of Zoology
- Faculty of Economics & Political Sciences: Department of Economics, Department of Political Sciences
- Faculty of Energy Sciences & Modern Technologies: Department of Aeronautics, Department of Biotechnology, Department of Energy, Department of Nanotechnology, Department of Cellulose and Paper sciences
- Faculty of Earth Sciences: Department of Geology, Department of Geography, Department of Geophysics
- Faculty of Law: Department of Criminology & Criminal Law, Department of Intellectual Property, Department of International Trade Law, Department of Economic Law, Department of Environmental Law, Department of Human Rights, Department of International Law, Department of Private Law, Department of Public Law
- Faculty of Literature & Human Sciences: Department of Linguistics and Literature, Department of Philosophy, Department of History, Department of Archaeology, Department of Sociology, Institute of Iranology
- Faculty of Mathematical Sciences: Department of Mathematics, Department of Statistics, Department of Computer Sciences
- Faculty of Nuclear Engineering: Department of Applied Radiation, Department of Fuel-Recycling, Department of Radiology (Medical Radiation)
- Faculty of Physical Education & Sport Sciences
- Faculty of Psychology and Education: Department of Psychology, Department of Behavioral Studies & Advising, Department of Educational Sciences
- Faculty of Sciences: Department of Chemistry, Department of Physics
- Faculty of Civil & Water & Environmental Engineering: Department of Water Resources Engineering, Department of Water and Wastewater Engineering, Department of Structural and Geotechnical Engineering, Department of Environmental Engineering, Department of transportation planning

== Research centers ==
- Institute for Cognitive and Brain Sciences (ICBS)
- Automated Software Engineering Research Group
- Center for Environmental Research
- Center for Cyberspace Research
  - Secure Communication and Cryptography
  - Content transfer technology
- Center for Family Research
- Center for Medicinal Plant and Drug Research Institute
  - Phytochemistry
- Laser and Plasma Research Institute
  - Fiber optics
  - Gas Discharge Laboratory headed by Dr. Hamid Ghomi
  - LIBS (Laser Induced Breakdown Spectroscopy)
  - Magneto-optics
  - Non-destructive Testing
  - Polymers and Organic Materials Photonics headed by Dr. Mohajerani
- Center for Pharmaceutical Research
- Iranian Research Center for the Silk Road (IRCSR)
- International Persian Language teaching Center
- Institute for Science and Technology Studies

== Notable people ==
=== Alumni ===
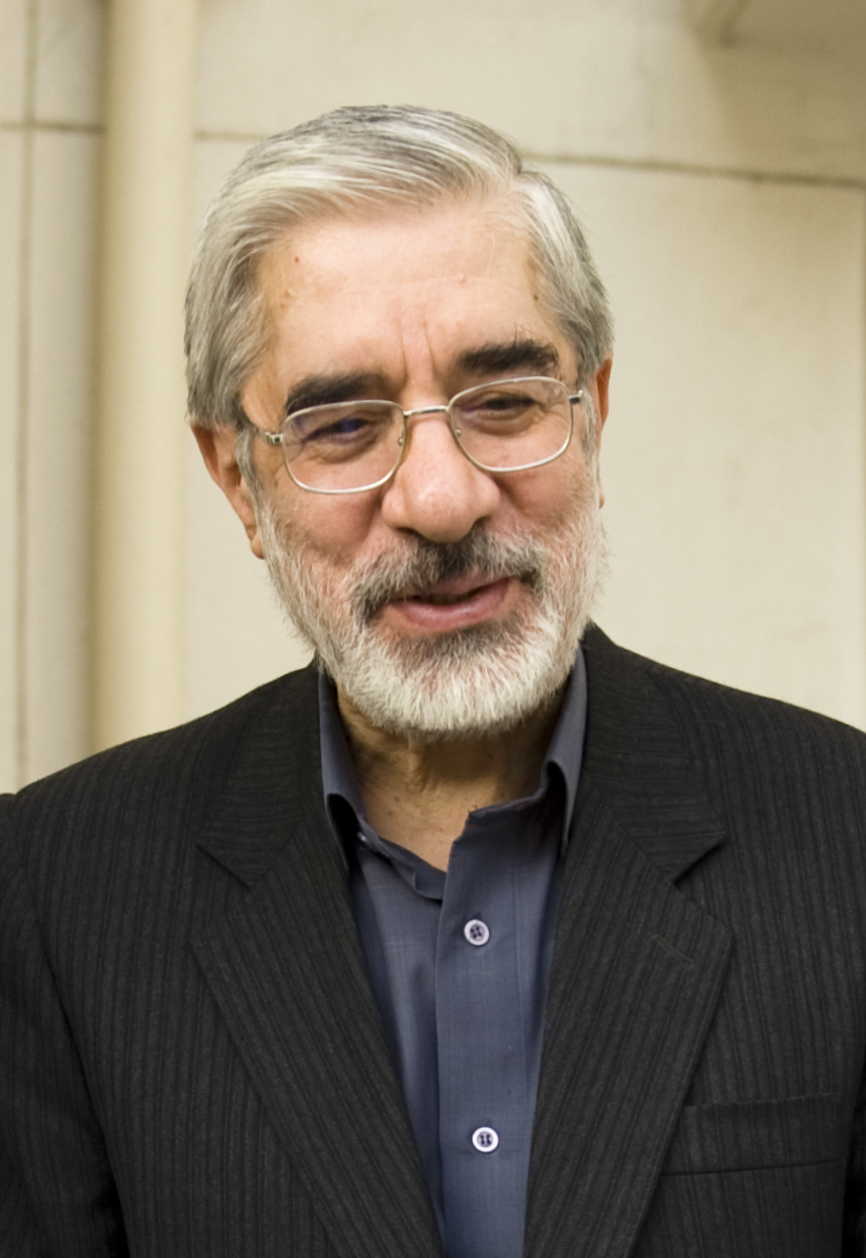
Mir-Hossein Mousavi

==== Politics ====
- Mir-Hossein Mousavi (BA, MA), Prime Minister of Iran (1981–1989)
- Masoumeh Ebtekar (BSc), Vice President of Iran for Women and Family Affairs (2017–), Vice President of Iran–Head of Department of Environment (1997–2005, 2013–2017), Member of the Islamic City Council of Tehran (2007–2013)
- Shahindokht Molaverdi (BA), academic, feminist, jurist, scholar, and aide to the President of Iran.
- Mohsen Sazegara (MA), former government official, political activist
- Abdolali Bazargan (MA), liberal politician, writer and intellectual
- Elaheh Koulaei (BA), professor of political science, political scientist, reformist politician, and intellectual; Member of Iranian Parliament (2000–2004)

==== Academics ====
- Mohammad Mehdi Tehranchi (BSc, MSc), president of the Islamic Azad University (2018–2025), chancellor of the Shahid Behesti University (2012–2017), professor in the Faculty of Physics at Shahid Behesti University (1998–2025)

==== Art ====
- Leila Araghian (BA), Architect

=== Faculty ===
==== Engineering ====
- Fereydoon Abbasi (Nuclear Engineering), Member of the 11th Parliament of Iran, head of the Atomic Energy Organization of Iran (2011–2013)
- Majid Shahriari (Nuclear Engineering), nuclear scientist, Iran's envoy in SESAME

==== Humanities ====
- Mahnaz Afkhami (born 1941) (English), Iranian-American politician and human rights and women's rights activist, served in the Cabinet of Iran (1976–78)
- Parviz Davoodi (Economy), First Vice President of Iran (2005–2009), head of the Iran's National Elites Foundation (2006–2007)
- Iraj Etesam (Architecture) is an Iranian contemporary architect, educator, and author, taught from 1960 to 1964.
- Nasrollah Hekmat (Philosophy), philosopher
- Mostafa Mohaghegh Damad (Law), member of the Academy of Sciences of Iran
- Ahmad Khatami (Persian Language and Literature)
- Saeed Laylaz (Economy), economist and journalist

== World rankings ==
University rankings
- Shahid Behesti University

Global – Overall
- CWTS World: 549 (2022)
- QS World: 741-750 (2026)
- THE World: 601–800 (2021)
- USNWR Global: 999 (2021)

Regional – Overall
- QS Asia: 234 (2025)

Times Higher Education

2018-2020: 801-1000

2017: 800

2016: 601-800

Asia University Rankings

2019: 201–250

Academic Ranking of World Universities

2019: 901-1000

- Based on the ranking system (Kakarry Simonds, QS), Shahid Behesti University was in the fifth grade for 2017 and 2018 after the Sharif universities, science and industry, Amirkabir and Tehran, respectively at the 701 + And 1000-800.
- Category B++
- Article 64.80
- Citation 63.34
- Total documents 30.59
- JIT 54.25
- JCIT 45.11
- Collaboration 45.32
- Total 303.42

== Damage during 2026 Iran war ==
The Laser and Plasma Research Institute at the main campus, as well as a workshop and central library at the engineering campus, were attacked and severely damaged in April 2026 by US–Israeli strikes during 2026 Iran war.

== See also ==
- Shahid Beheshti University of Medical Sciences
- Tehran University
- Allameh Tabataba'i University
- Tarbiat Modares University
