= Mellat Park =

Urban park in northern Tehran, Iran

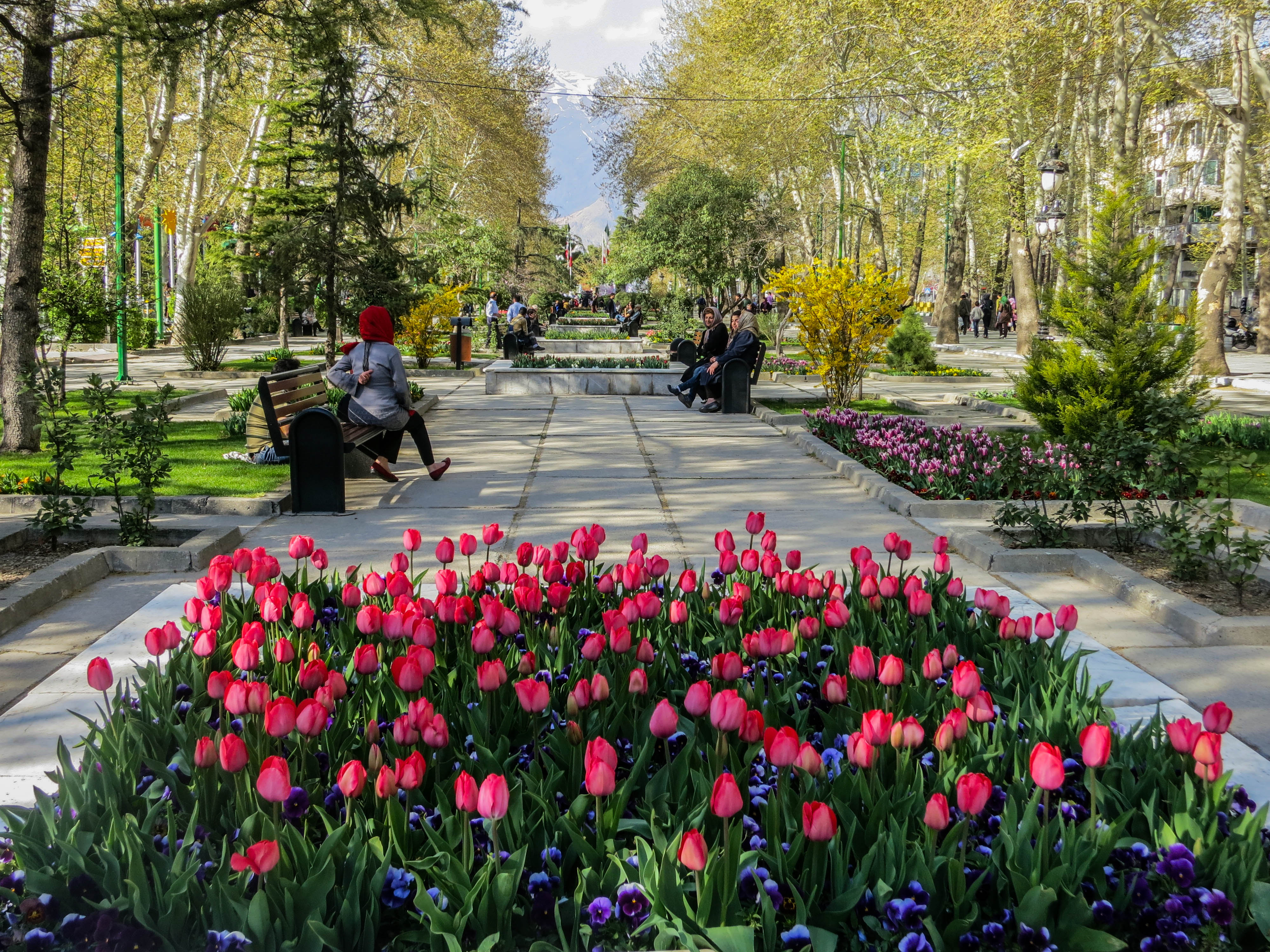
- Interactive map of Mellat Park
- Type: Urban park
- Location: Tehran, Iran
- Coordinates: 35.7784°N 51.4105°E
- Related websites: www.cinemamellat.com

Mellat Park (Persian: پارک ملت, Pārk-e Mellat), literally the Nation Park, is an urban park in northern Tehran, Iran.

It is one of the city's largest green spaces, situated adjacent to Valiasr Street at the foot of the Alborz mountains to the east, extending to Chamran Expressway and Seoul Street to the west.

The park lies in the southern grounds of Tehran International Fair and the Enghelab Club. It is home to one of the first musical fountains in Tehran.

The park, designed by Iraj Etesam, was created by the initiative of Shahbanu Farah as the Imperial Park (Persian: پارک شاهنشاهی Pārk-e Šāhanšāhi). Following the 1979 Revolution, it was renamed Mellat Park. It is also the location of a steam-powered locomotive used on Iran's first railway section, built between 1886 and 1888. The locomotive was built by Belgian group Ateliers de Tubize, commissioned in 1887.

== Mellat Gallery and Cineplex ==
Mellat Gallery and Cineplex are located to the southeast of the park. It was designed by architects Reza Daneshmir and Catherine Spiridonoff in an area of about 6,000 square meters, and was first opened on 9 November 2008.

The complex includes four theater halls, a cinematheque, and a space for holding exhibitions and marketing cultural products.

== Gallery ==
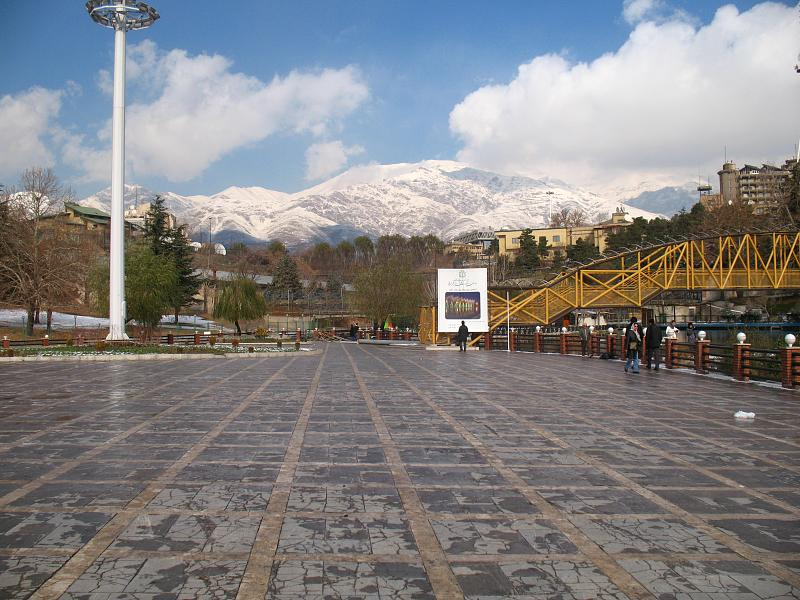
Mount Tochal seen from Mellat Park

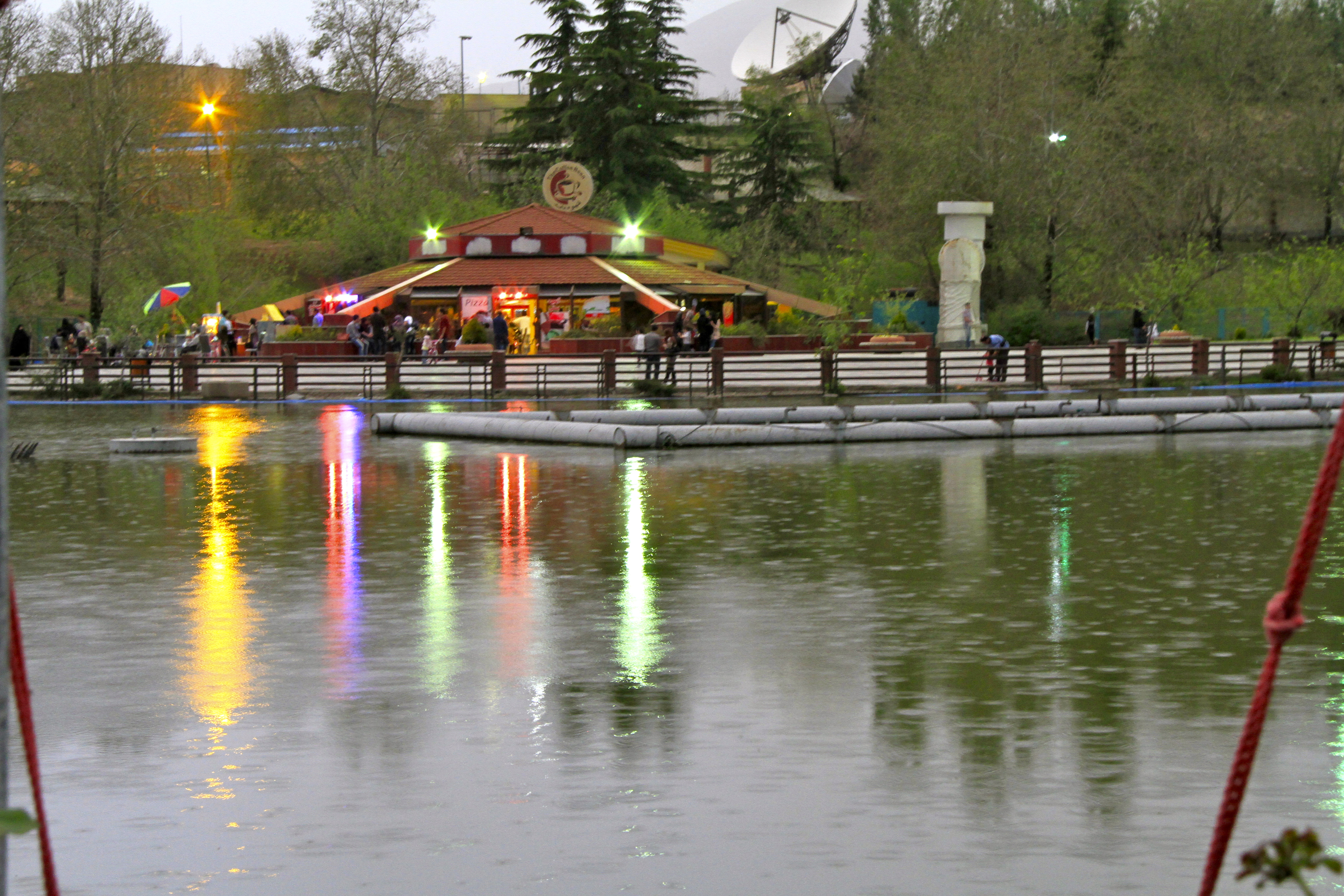
A cafeteria inside the pool of Mellat Park

Mellat Cineplex

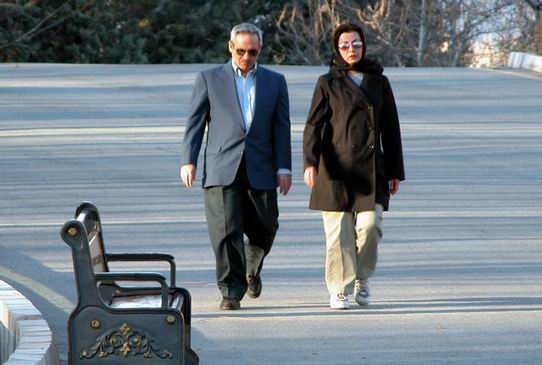
People walking at Mellat Park

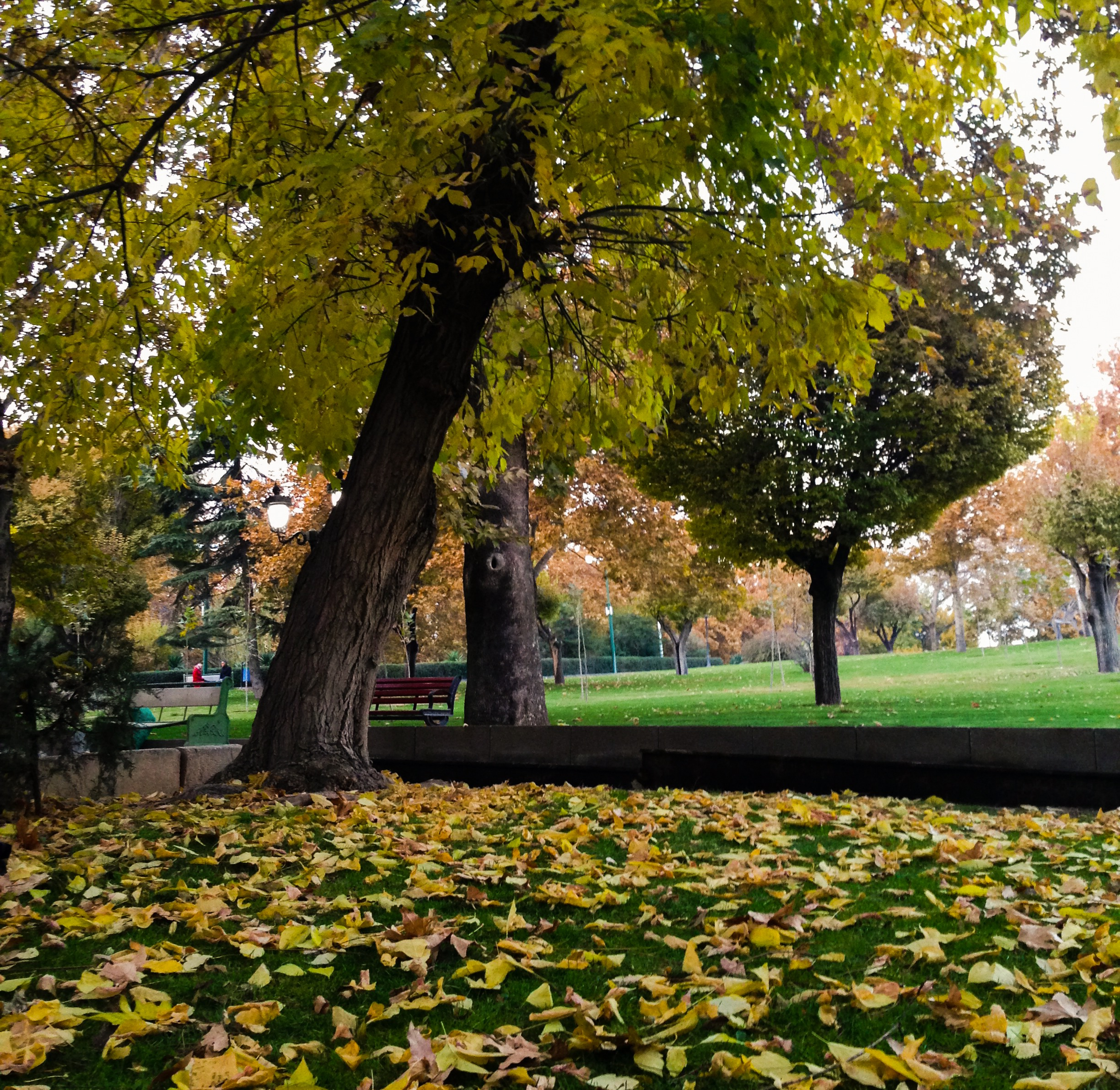
Mellat Park in autumn

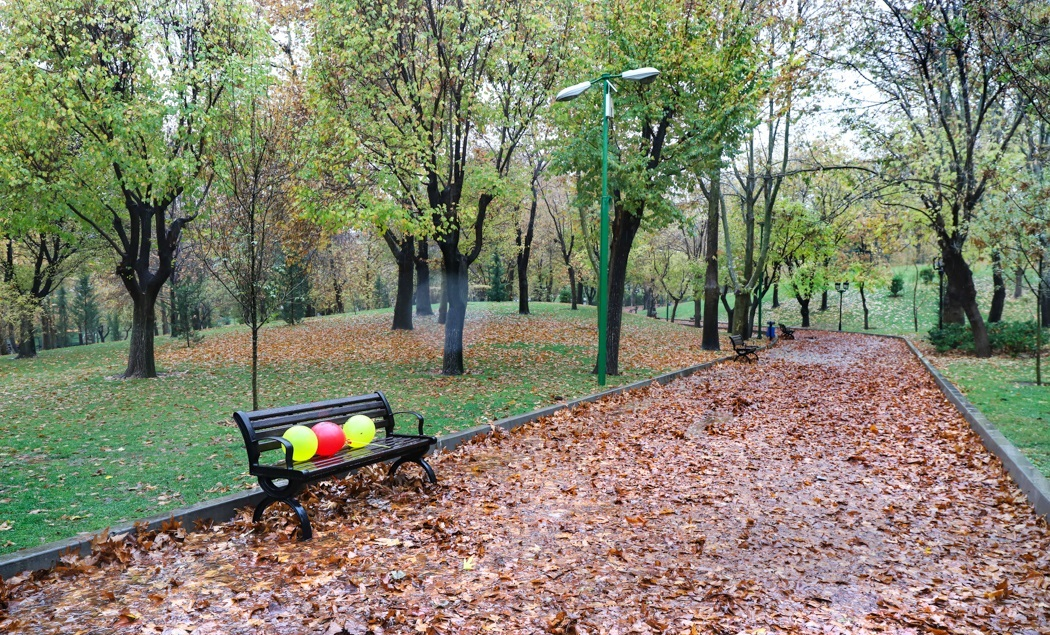
Mellat Park in autumn

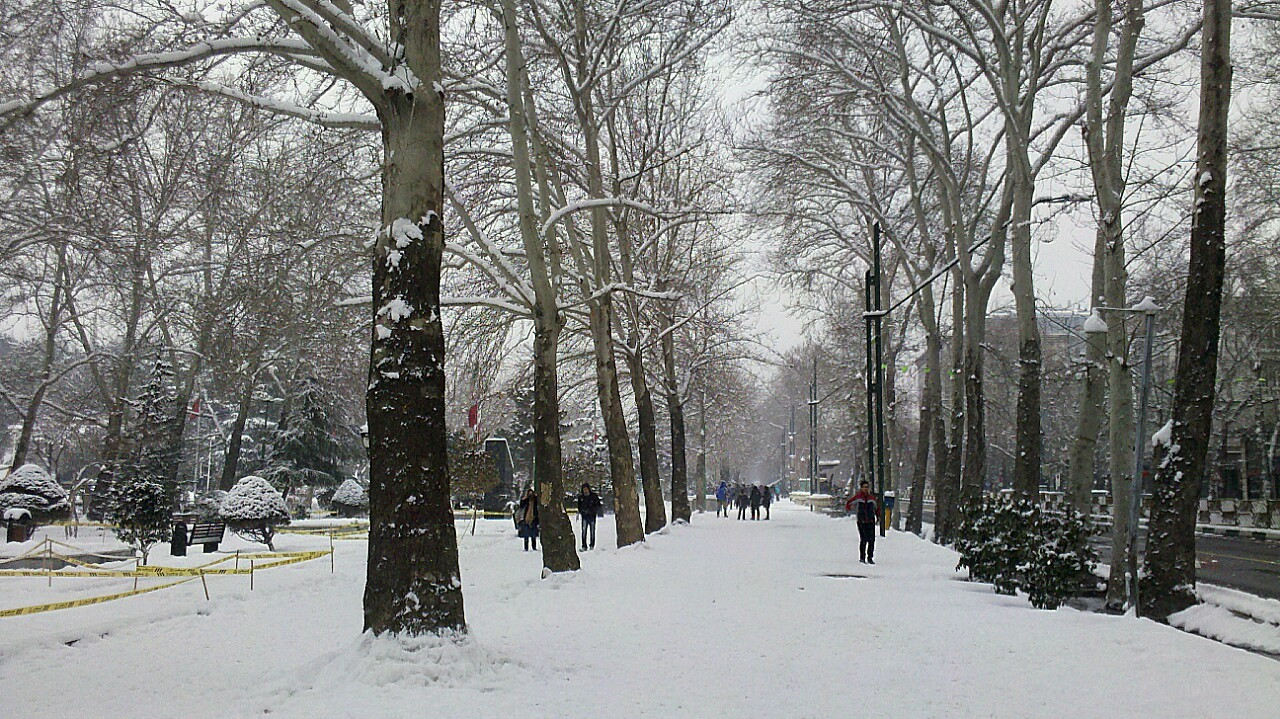
Mellat Park in winter

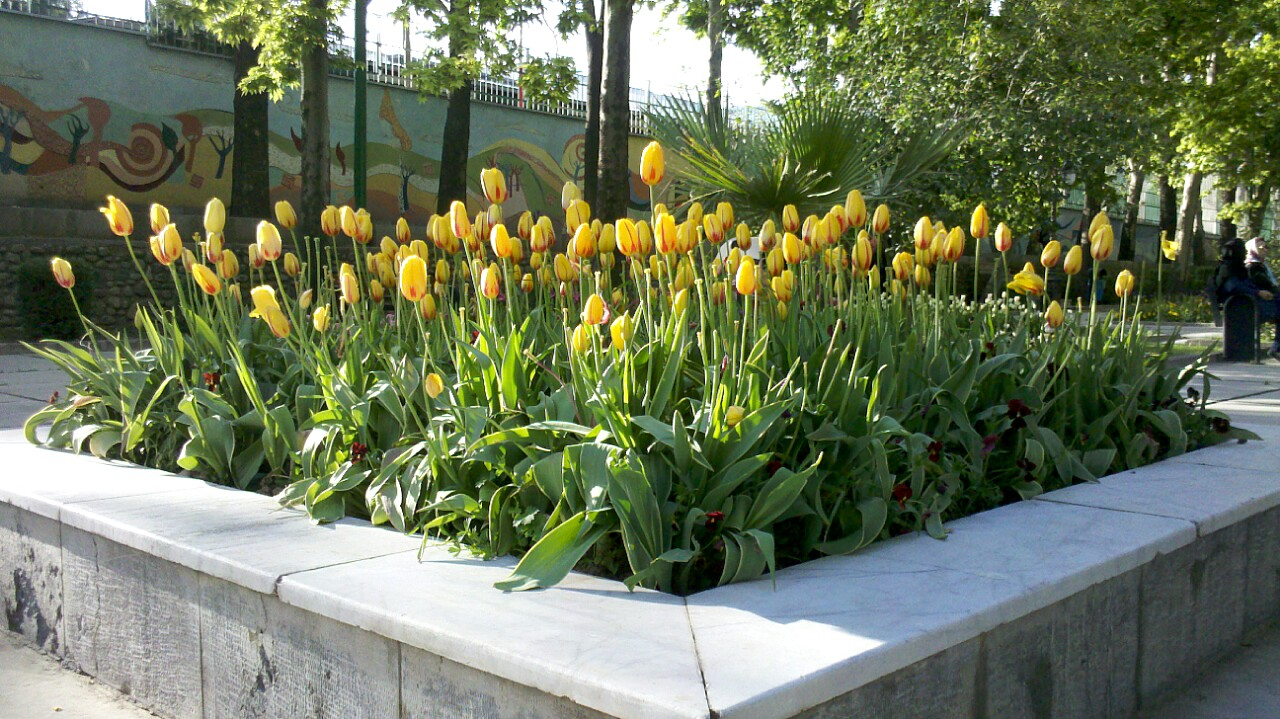
Yellow tulips at Mellat Park

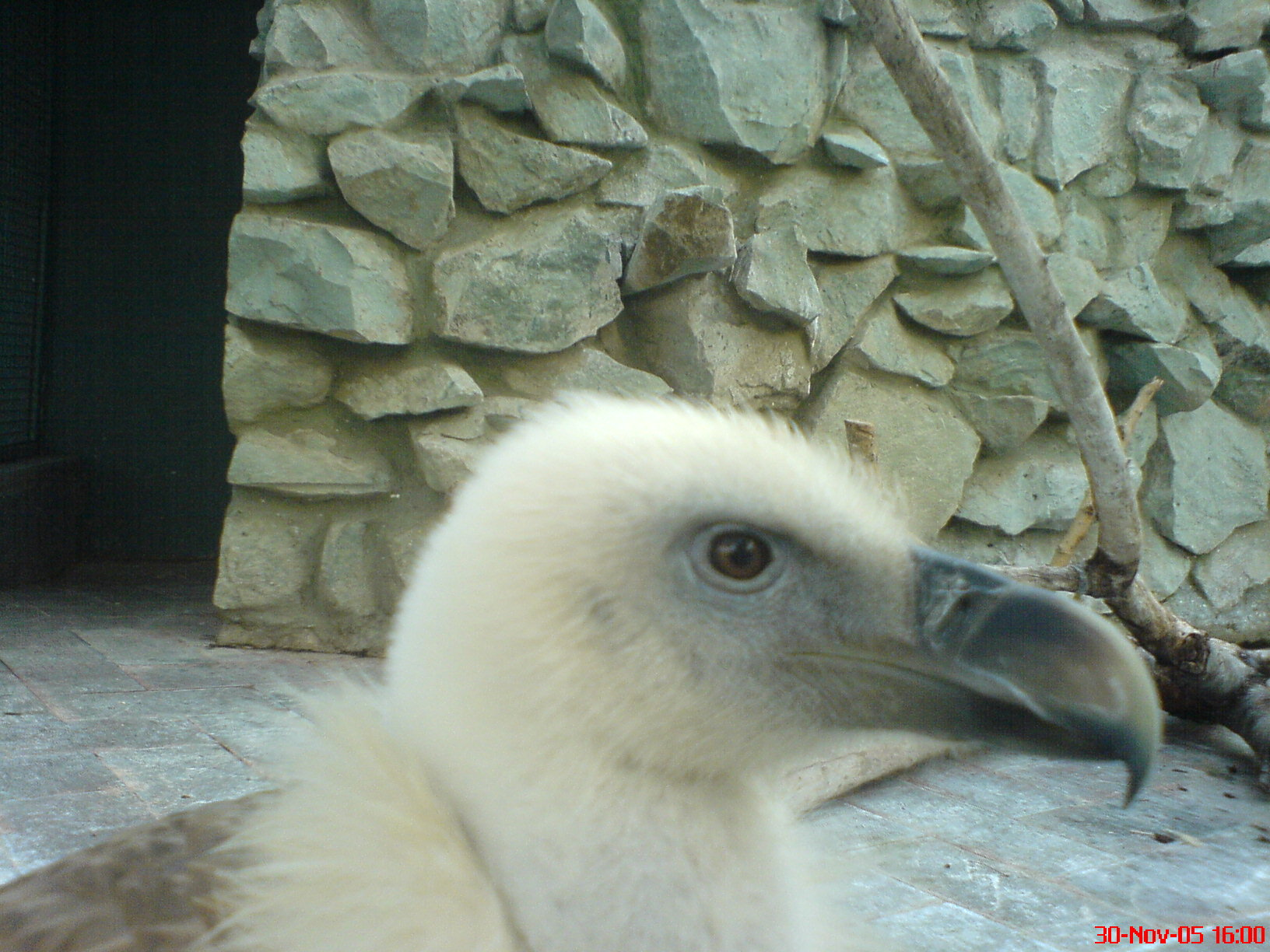
A vulture at the aviary of Mellat Park

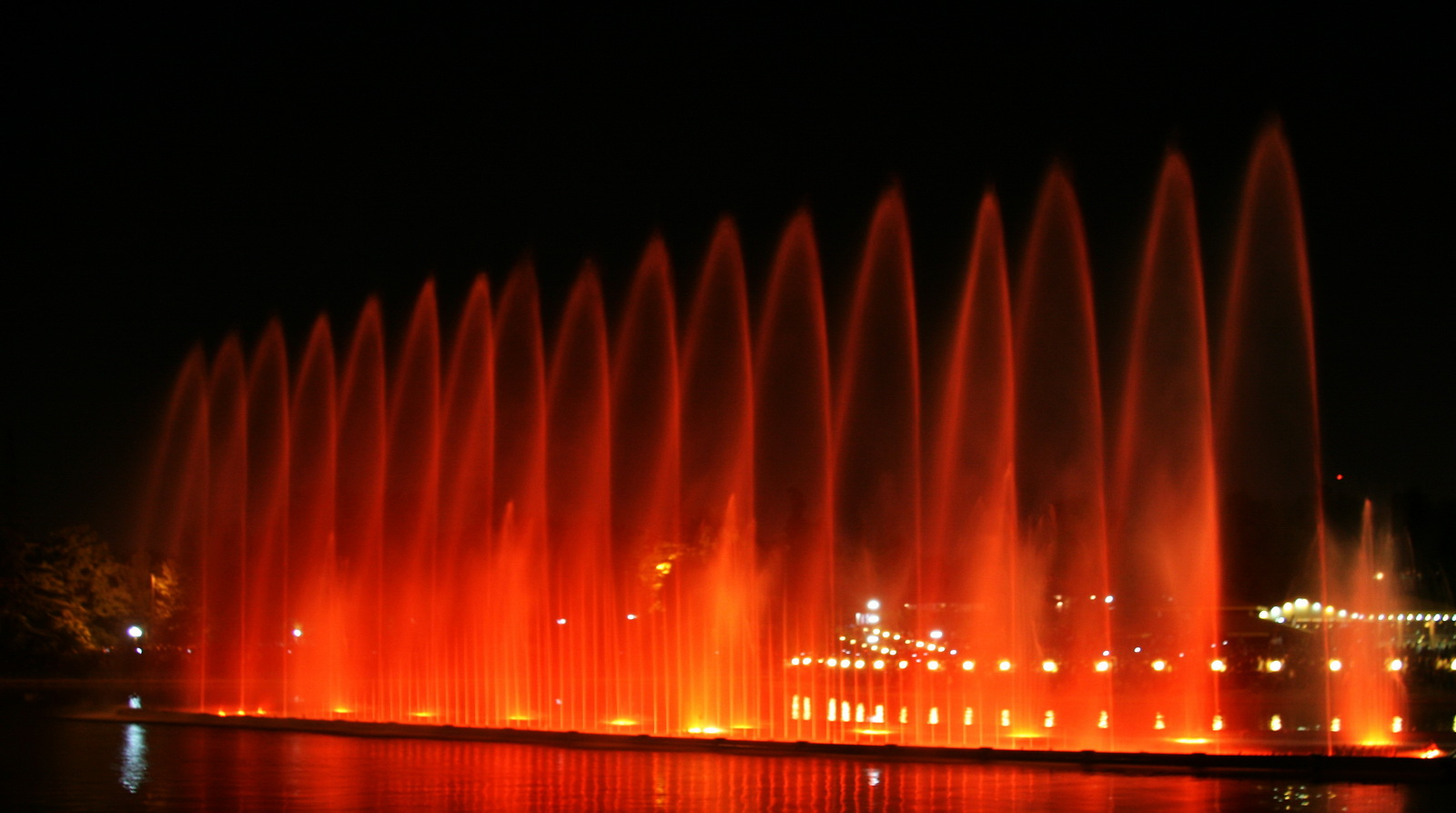
Fountains at Mellat Park
