= Meydan-e Shohada Metro Station =

Station of the Tehran Metro

Coordinates: 35.6902°N 51.4476°E

Meydan-e Shohada Station ایستگاه میدان شهدا

General information
- Location: Shohada Square, Districts 12-13-14, Tehran; Tehran Province, Iran
- System: Tehran Metro Station
- Operator: Tehran Urban and Suburban Railways Organization (Metro)

History
- Opened: 1387 H-Kh (16 March 2009); 1398 H-Kh (7 April 2019)

Services
Preceding station	Tehran Metro	Following station
Darvazeh Shemiran towards Allameh Jafari	Line 4	Ebn-e Sina towards Shahid Kolahdooz
Imam Hossein towards Shahid Arman Aliverdi	Line 6	Amir Kabir towards Dowlat Abad
Location

Meydan-e Shohada Metro Station is an interchange station between Tehran Metro Line 4 and Line 6. Originally, it was the eastern terminus of line 4 which got subsequently extended further. Since April 2019 line 6 terminates here.

The station is located at Shohada Square along 17th of Shahrivar Ave. It is between Ebn-e Sina Metro Station and Darvazeh Shemiran Metro Station.
