= Daneshgah-e Tarbiat Modares Metro Station =

Station of the Tehran Metro

Daneshgah-e Tarbiat Modares Metro Station ایستگاه مترو دانشگاه تربیت مدرس

General information
- Location: Chamran Expressway, Districts 2-6, Tehran; Tehran Province, Iran
- Coordinates: 35.7250329°N 51.3806452°E
- System: Tehran Metro Station
- Operator: Tehran Urban and Suburban Railways Organization (Metro)
- Platforms: 4 Side platforms

Construction
- Structure type: Underground

History
- Opened: 30 Shahrivar 1396 H-Sh (21 September 2017)
- Closed: 8 Aban 1396 H-Sh (30 October 2017)
- Rebuilt: 25 Esfand 1397 H-Sh (16 March 2019)

Services
Preceding station	Tehran Metro	Following station
Modafean Salamat towards Varzeshgah-e Takhti	Line 7	Boostan-e Goftegou towards Meydan-e Ketab
Preceding station	Tehran Metro	Following station
Shahrak-e Azmayesh towards Shahid Arman Aliverdi	Line 6	Karegar towards Dowlat Abad
Location

Daneshgah-e Tarbiat Modares Metro Station is a station in Tehran Metro Line 7&6 It is located on the intersection of Chamran Expressway and Jalal-e-Ale Ahmad Expressway, near its namesake Tarbiat Modares University.
