= Shademan Metro Station =

Station of the Tehran Metro

Shademan Metro Station ایستگاه مترو شادمان
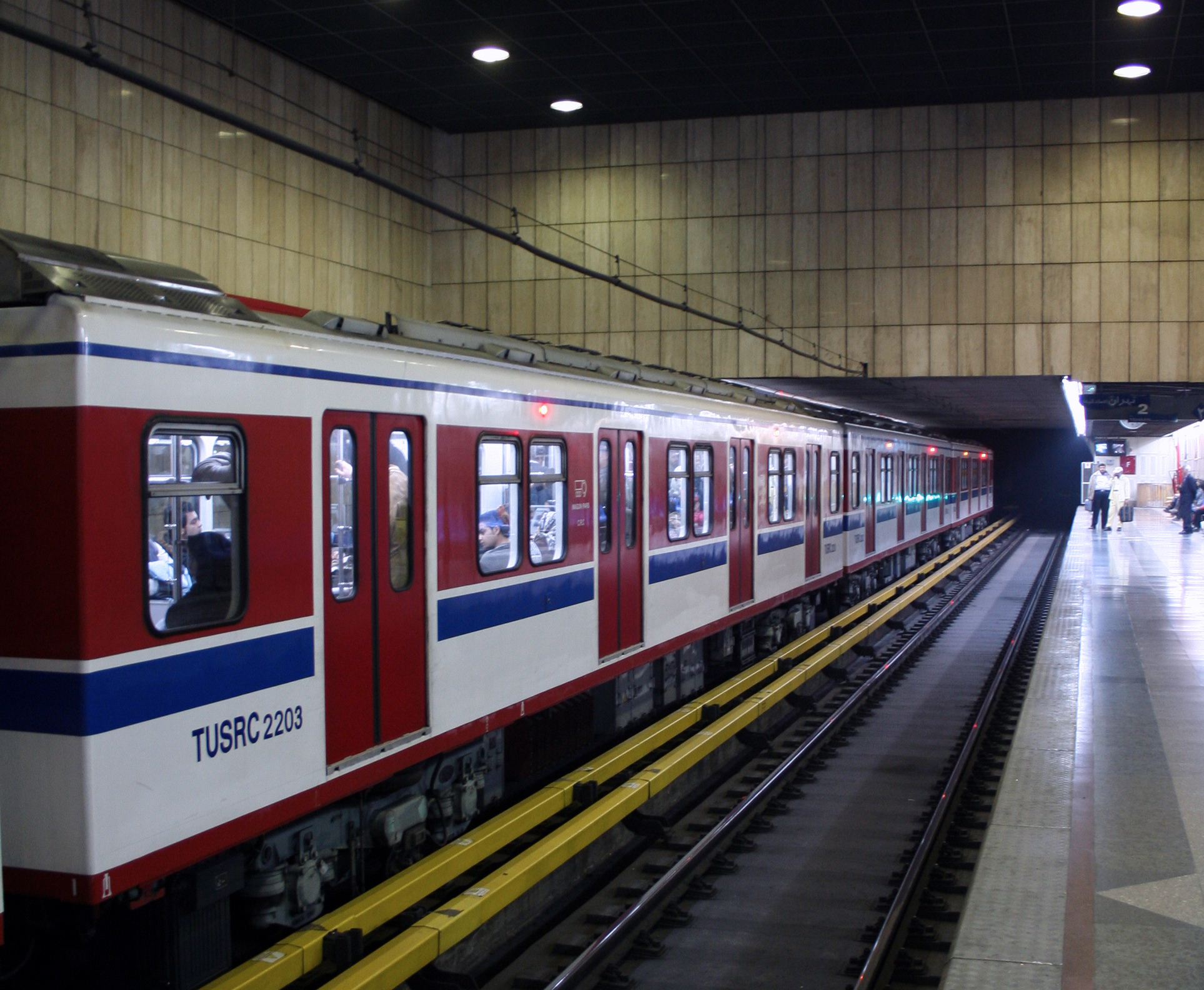
- Shademan Station Line 2 Platform

General information
- Location: Azadi Street- Azarbaijan Street; Districts 2-10, Tehran, Tehran County; Tehran Province, Iran
- Coordinates: 35°42′04″N 51°19′55″E
- System: Tehran Metro Station
- Operator: Tehran Urban and Suburban Railways Organization (Metro)
- Platforms: Side Platform; Side Platform

History
- Opened: 1378 H-Kh (1999); 1389 H-Kh (2010)

Services
Preceding station	Tehran Metro	Following station
Daneshgah-e Sharif towards Tehran (Sadeghiyeh)	Line 2	Shahid Navvab-e Safavi towards Farhangsara
Doctor Habib-o-llah towards Allameh Jafari	Line 4	Towhid towards Shahid Kolahdooz
Location

Shademan Metro Station is a station on Tehran Metro Line 2 and Line 4. It is located in the junction of Azadi Street and Azarbayjan Street. It is between Navvab Metro Station and Sharif University Metro Station. Its name was changed from Azadi Station to Shademan Station as it is located on Shademan Jct. on Azadi Street to avoid confusion with Meydan-e Azadi Metro Station located at the famous Azadi Square.

== Features ==
- Payphone
- Drinking fountain
- Two elevator(on both Azadi Street and Shadmehr Street)
- Praying room
- Escalator
- Snack bar

== Gallery ==
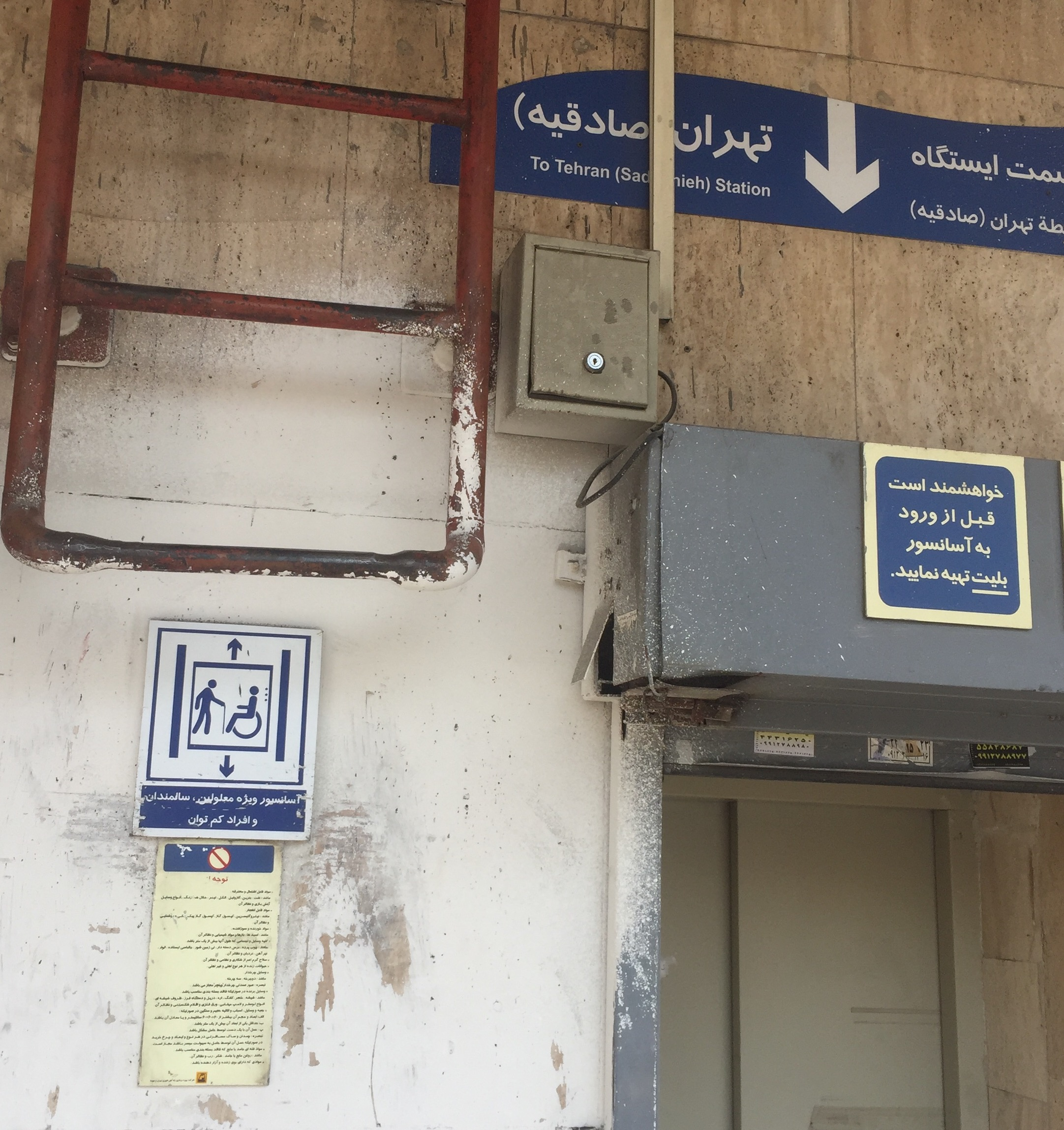
A metro elevator
