= List of Tehran Metro stations =

Tehran's Metro system is planned to consist of a total of seven lines; 7 lines (Lines 1–7) with 163 stations to November 2026, six of which are metro-service lines (Lines 1–4 and 6 & 7), are currently operational. Lines 1 and 2 cross each other at Imam Khomeini station. Line 5 is a suburban rail line that attaches to Line 2 at Tehran (Sadeghieh) station; it extends into the Karaj area and is connected to Karaj's rail line. Line Imam Khomeini Airport to Parnd City is a metro express.

== Line 1 ==
Line 1 consists of 32 stations.

Station	Connections
Tajrish	
Gheytariyeh	
Shahid Sadr	
Gholhak	
Shariati	
Mirdamad	
Shahid Haghani	
Shahid Hemmat	
Mosalla Imam Khomeini	
Shahid Beheshti	Line 3
Shahid Mofatteh	
Shohada-ye Haftom-e Tir	Line 6
Taleghani	
Darvazeh Dowlat	Line 4
Saadi	
Imam Khomeini	Line 2
Panzdah-e-Khordad (15th of Khordad)	
Khayam	
Meydan-e Mohammadiyeh	Line 7
Shush	
Payane Jonoob	
Shahid Bokharaei	
Ali Abad	
Javanmard-e-Ghassab	
Shahr-e-Rey	Line 6
Palayeshgah	
Shahed - Bagher Shahr	Imam Khomeini International Airport and Parand City Line 1
Haram-e Motahhar-e Emam Khomeini	
Kahrizak	

== Line 2 ==
Line 2 consists of 24 (22 active) stations.

Station	Connections	Situation
Pardis Mosaferi Shargh		Under construction
Shahid Babaeian		Under construction
Farhangsara		
Tehranpars		
Shahidan Bagheri		
Elm-o-Sanat University		
Sarsabz		
Janbazan		
Fadak		
Sabalan		
Shahid Madani		
Imam Hossein	Line 6	
Darvazeh Shemiran	Line 4	
Baharestan		
Mellat		
Imam Khomeini	Line 1	
Hasan Abad		
Daneshgah-e Emam Ali		
Meydan-e Horr		
Shahid Navvab-e Safavi	Line 7	
Shademan	Line 4	
Daneshgah-e Sharif		
Tarasht		
Tehran (Sadeghiyeh)	Line 5	

== Line 3 ==
Line 3 consists of 25 stations.

Station	Connections
Ghaem	
Shahid Mahallati	
Aghdasiyeh	
Nobonyad	
Hossein Abad	
Heravi	
Shahid Zeyn-o-ddin	
Khajeh Abdollah-e Ansari	
Shahid Sayyad-e Shirazi	
Shahid Ghoddoosi	
Sohrevardi	
Shahid Beheshti	Line 1
Mirzaye Shirazi	
Meydan-e Jahad	
Meydan-e Vali Asr	Line 6
Teatr-e Shahr	Line 4
Moniriyeh	
Mahdiyeh	Line 7
Rahahan	
Javadiyeh	
Zam Zam	
Shahrak-e Shari'ati	
Abdol Abad	
Ne'mat Abad	
Azadegan	

== Line 4 ==
Line 4 consists of 25 (23 active) stations.

Station	Connections	Situation
Shahid Kolahdooz		
Nirooye Havaei		
Nabard		
Piroozi		
Ebn-e Sina		
Meydan-e Shohada	Line 6	
Darvazeh Shemiran	Line 2	
Darvazeh Dowlat	Line 1	
Ferdowsi		
Teatr-e Shahr	Line 3	
Meydan-e Enghelab-e Eslami		
Towhid	Line 7	
Shademan	Line 2	
Doctor Habib-o-llah		
Ostad Moein		
Meydan-e Azadi		
Bimeh	Mehrabad International Airport Line 4	
Shahrak-e Ekbatan		
Eram-e Sabz	Line 5	
Allameh Jafari		
Ayatollah Kashani	Line 6	Under construction
Chahar Bagh		Under construction

== Line 5 ==
Line 5 is a suburban rail line that consists of 13 stations.

Station	Connections
Tehran (Sadeghiyeh)	Line 2
Eram-e Sabz	Line 4
Varzeshgah-e Azadi	
Chitgar	
Iran Khodro	
Vardavard	
Garmdarreh	
Atmosfer	
Karaj	
Mohammad Shahr	
Golshahr	
Shahid Fakhrizadeh (Mammut)	
Shahid Sepahbod Qasem Soleimani	

== Line 6 ==
Line 6 consists of 32 (26 active) stations.

Station	Connections	Situation
Shahid Arman Aliverdi (Kouhsar)		
Shohada-ye Kan		
Shahran		
Shahr-e Ziba		
Ayatollah Kashani	Line 4	
Shahid Sattari		
Shahid Ashrafi Esfahani		
Yadegar-e Emam		
Marzdaran		
Shahrak-e Azmayesh		
Daneshgah-e Tarbiat Modares	Line 7	
Karegar		
Boostan-e Laleh		
Meydan-e Vali Asr	Line 3	
Maryam-e Moghaddas (Shahid Nejatollahi)		
Shohada-ye haftom-e Tir	Line 1	
Bahar Shiraz		
Sarbaz Vatan		
Imam Hossein	Line 2	
Meydan-e Shohada	Line 4	
Amir Kabir		
Shohada-ye Hefdah-e Shahrivar	Line 7	Under construction
Meydan-e Khorasan		
Shahid Rezaei		
Besat		
Kiyan Shahr		
Shohada-ye Dowlat Abad		
Cheshme Ali		Under construction
Ebn-e Babvieh		Under construction
Meydan-e Hazrat-e Abdol Azim		Under construction
Haram-e Hazrat-e Abdol Azim		Under construction
Shahr-e-Rey	Line 1	Under construction

== Line 7 ==
Line 7 consists of 24 (22 active) stations.

Station	Connections	Situation
Daneshgah-e Azad Eslami		Under Construction
Chahar Divari		Under Construction
Meydan-e Ketab		
Shahid Dadman		
Meydan-e San'at		
Borj-e Milad-e Tehran		
Boostan-e Goftegou		
Daneshgah-e Tarbiat Modares	Line 6	
Modafean Salamat		
Towhid	Line 4	
Shahid Navvab-e Safavi	Line 2	
Roudaki		
Komeyl		
Beryanak		
Helal-e Ahmar		
Mahdiyeh	Line 3	
Meydan-e Mohammadiyeh	Line 1	
Molavi		
Meydan-e Ghiam		
Shohada-ye Hefdah-e Shahrivar	Line 6	
Chehel Tan-e Doolab		
Ahang		
Basij		
Varzeshgah-e Takhti		

== Interchange stations ==
- 1- Darvazeh Shemiran; Lines 2 & 4
- 2- Shahid Beheshti; Lines 1 & 3
- 3- Darvazeh Dowlat; Lines 1 & 4
- 4- Imam Khomeini; Lines 1 & 2
- 5- Theatr-e Shahr; Lines 3 & 4
- 6- Shademan; Lines 2 & 4
- 7- (Tehran) Sadeghiyeh; Lines 2 & 5
- 8- Eram-e Sabz; Lines 4 & 5
- 9- Shahid Navvab-e Safavi; Lines 2 & 7
- 10- Mahdiyeh; Lines 3 & 7
- 11- Meydan-e Shohada; Lines 4 & 6
- 12- Meydan-e Mohammadiyeh; Lines 1 & 7
- 13- Imam Hossein; Lines 2 & 6
- 14- Daneshgah-e Tarbiat Modares; Lines 6 & 7
- 15- Towhid; Lines 4 & 7
- 16- Shohada-ye Haftom-e Tir; Lines 1 & 6
- 17- Meydan-e Vali Asr; Lines 3 & 6
- 18- Shohada-ye Hefdah-e Shahrivar; Lines 6 & 7 (under construction on line 6, operational on line 7)
- 19- Ayatollah Kashani; Lines 4 & 6 (under construction on line 4, operational on line 6)
- 20- Shahr-e-Rey; Lines 1 & 6 (operational on line 1, under construction on line 6)
