= Basij Metro Station =

Urban rail station in Tehran, Iran

Basij Metro Station ایستگاه مترو بسیج
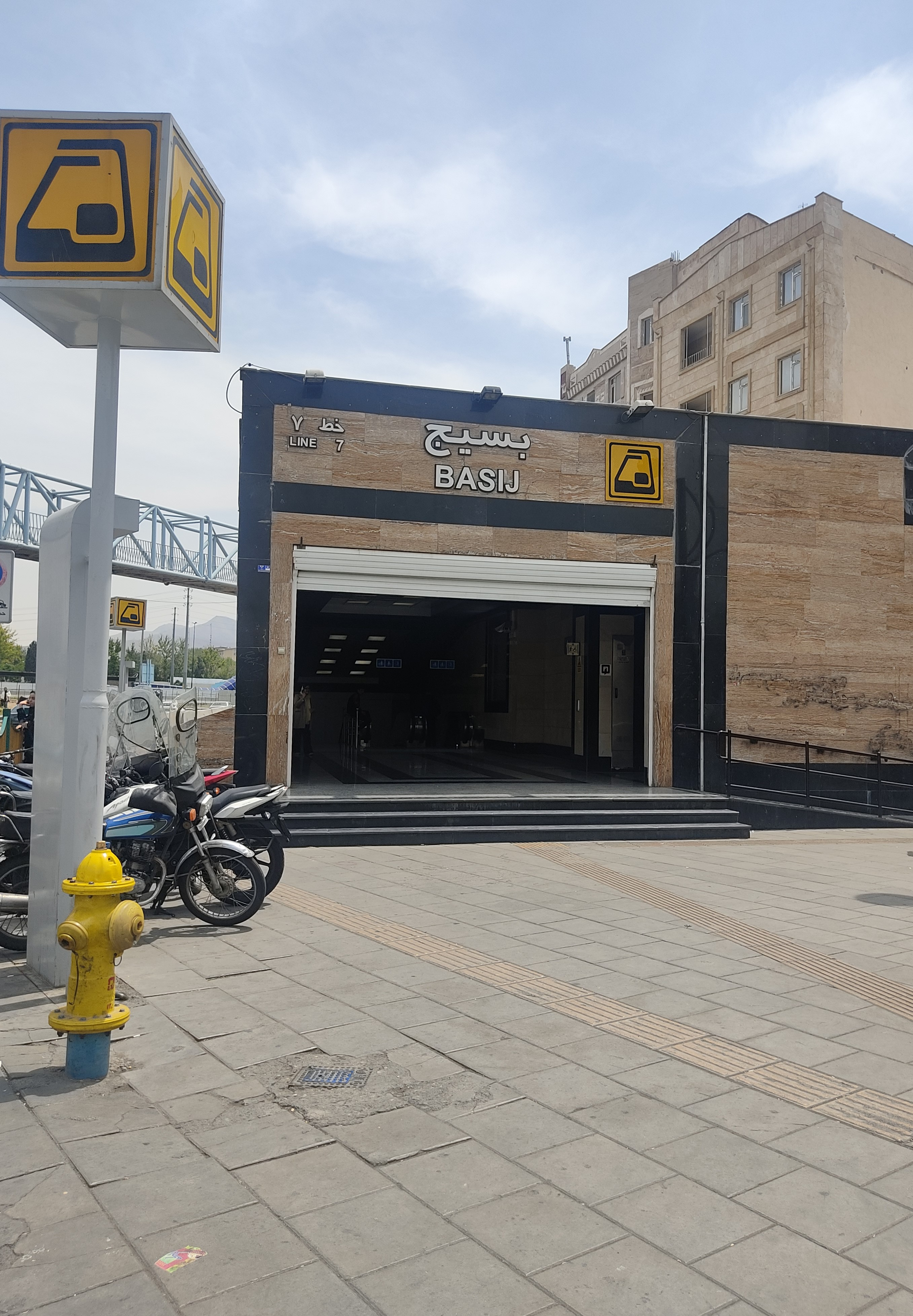

General information
- Location: Mahallati Expressway, District 14, Tehran; Tehran province, Iran
- Coordinates: 35.6664063°N 51.4903878°E
- System: Tehran Metro Station
- Operator: Tehran Urban and Suburban Railways Organization (Metro)
- Connections: Tehran BRT: BRT 3

History
- Opened: 20 Khordad 1396 H-Sh (10 June 2017)
- Closed: 8 Aban 1396 H-Sh (30 October 2017)
- Rebuilt: 4 Shahrivar 1398 H-Sh (26 August 2019)

Services
Preceding station	Tehran Metro	Following station
Varzeshgah-e Takhti Terminus	Line 7	Ahang towards Meydan-e Ketab
Location

Basij Metro Station is a station in Tehran Metro Line 7. It is the current Southeastern terminus of the line. It opened along with Line 7 on 10 June 2017.
