= Besat Metro Station =

Station of the Tehran Metro

Besat Metro Station ایستگاه مترو بعثت
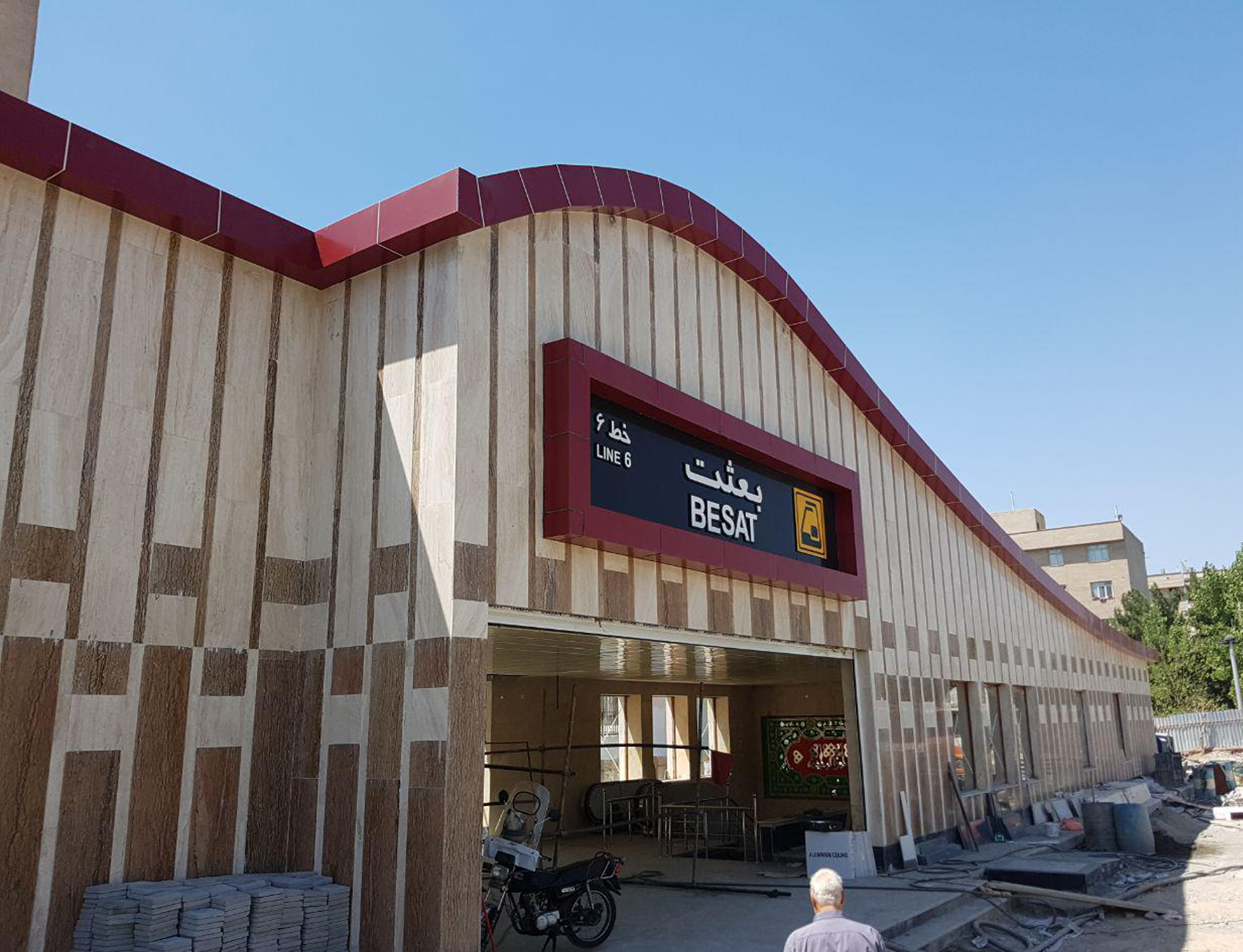

General information
- Location: Ebrahim Raisi Expressway, District 15, Tehran; Tehran Province, Iran
- Coordinates: 35.6447°N 51.4443°E
- System: Tehran Metro Station
- Operator: Tehran Urban and Suburban Railways Organization (Metro)
- Connections: Tehran BRT: BRT 8

History
- Opened: 18 Farvardin, 1398 H-Sh (April 7, 2019)

Services
Preceding station	Tehran Metro	Following station
Shahid Rezaei towards Shahid Arman Aliverdi	Line 6	Kiyan Shahr towards Dowlat Abad
Location

Besat Metro Station is a station of Tehran Metro Line 6, and currently the line's only intermediate station. It is located at the junction of 17th of Shahrivar Avenue into Ebrahim Raisi Expressway, with the station's main entrance on the southern sidewalk of Be'sat Expressway.
