= Ebn-e Sina Metro Station =

Station of the Tehran Metro

Ebn-e Sina Metro Station ایستگاه مترو ابن‌سینا
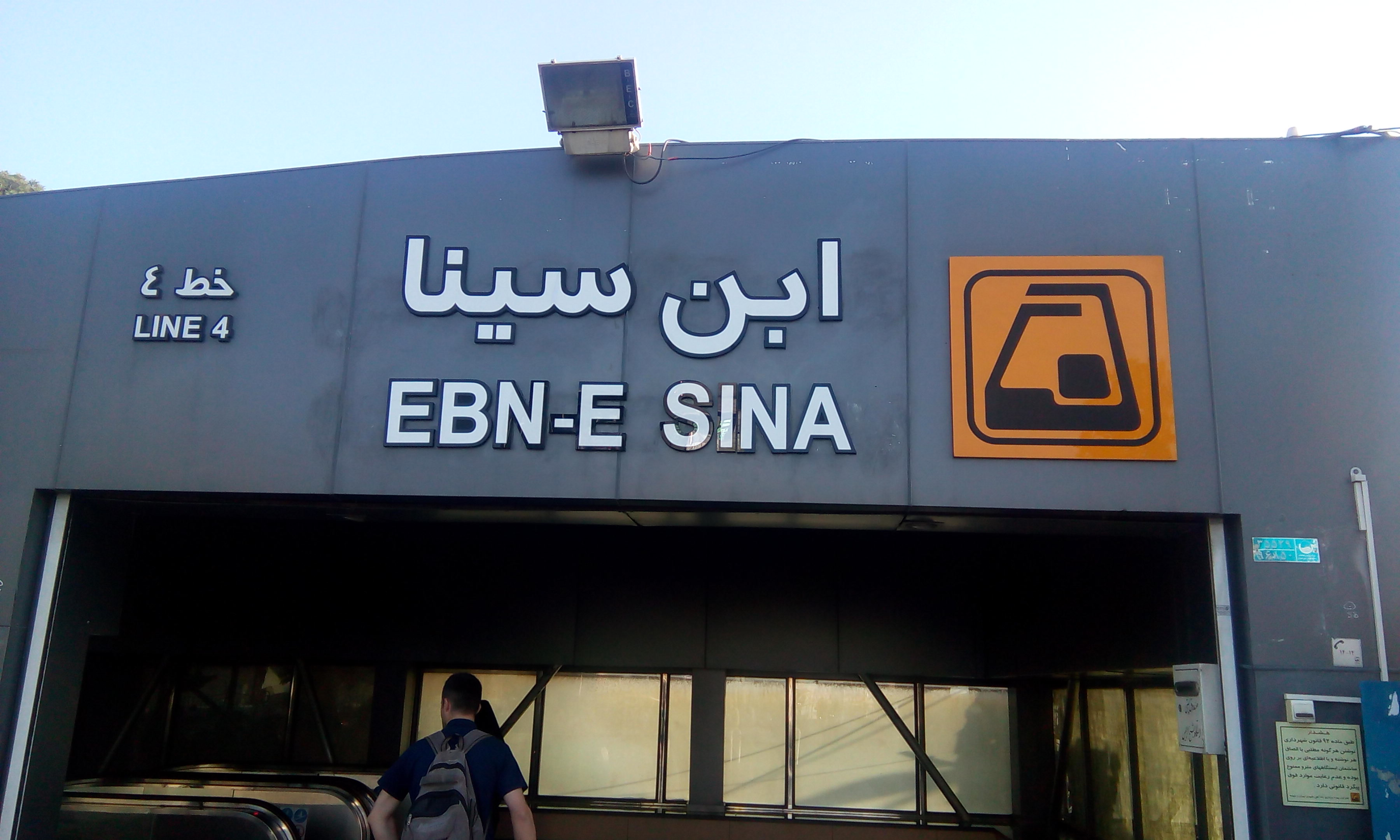

General information
- Location: Piruzi Street- Imam Ali Expressway, Districts 13-14, Tehran; Tehran Province, Iran
- Coordinates: 35.6904°N 51.4568°E
- System: Tehran Metro Station
- Operator: Tehran Urban and Suburban Railways Organization (Metro)
- Connections: Tehran BRT: BRT 9

History
- Opened: 1390 H-Kh (2011) as Sheykh-o-raeis Metro Station

Services
Preceding station	Tehran Metro	Following station
Meydan-e Shohada towards Allameh Jafari	Line 4	Piroozi towards Shahid Kolahdooz
Location

Ebn-e Sina Metro Station is a station of Tehran Metro Line 4. Originally named "Sheykh-o-raeis Metro Station" it was renamed in 2016. It is located in Piruzi street before Chaharsad dastgah.
