= Tehran Milad Tower Metro Station =

Metro station in Tehran, Iran

Tehran Milad Tower Metro Station ایستگاه مترو برج میلاد تهران

General information
- Location: District 2, Tehran; Tehran Province, Iran
- Coordinates: 35.7468257°N 51.3789936°E
- System: Tehran Metro Station
- Operator: Tehran Urban and Suburban Railways Organization (Metro)
- Platforms: 2 Side platforms
- Tracks: 2

Construction
- Structure type: Underground

History
- Opened: 27 Azar 1399 H-Sh (17 December 2020)

Services
Preceding station	Tehran Metro	Following station
Boostan-e Goftegou towards Varzeshgah-e Takhti	Line 7	Meydan-e San'at towards Meydan-e Ketab
Location

Tehran Milad Tower Metro Station (Also transcribed as Borj-e Milad-e Tehran) is a station in Tehran Metro Line 7. It is located on the grounds of the International Trade and Convention Center of Tehran around Milad Tower and next to Milad Hospital. The station is currently the second to last station of Line 7 towards the northwest.
