= Meydan-e San'at Metro Station =

Station of the Tehran Metro

Meydan-e San'at Metro Station ایستگاه مترو میدان صنعت
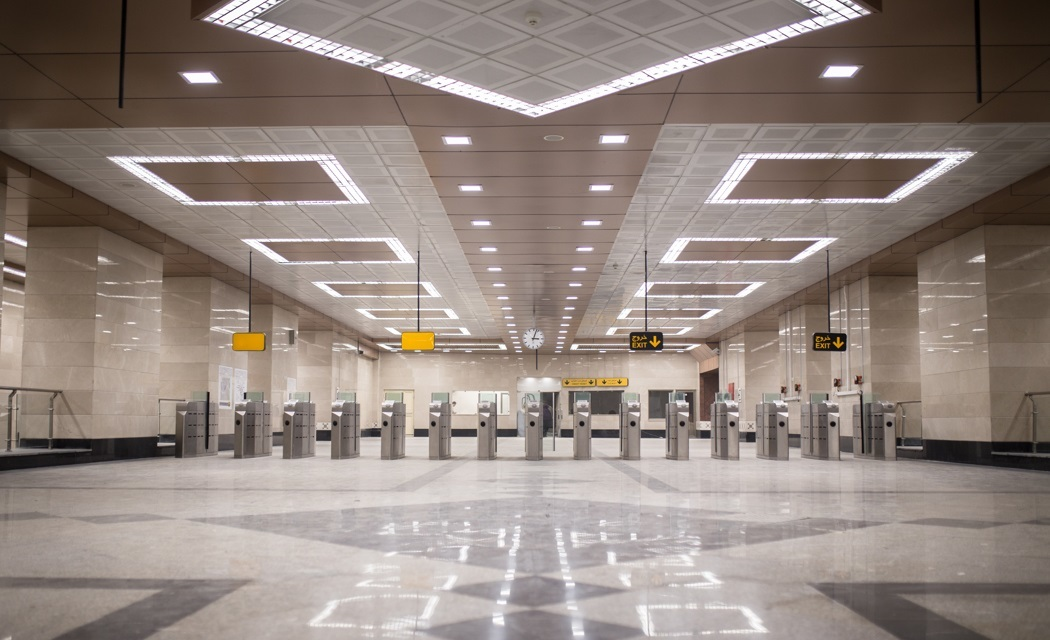

General information
- Location: Navvab Expressway, District 2, Tehran; Tehran Province, Iran
- Coordinates: 35.7550157°N 51.3672315°E
- System: Tehran Metro Station
- Operator: Tehran Urban and Suburban Railways Organization (Metro)
- Platforms: 2 Side platforms

Construction
- Structure type: Underground

History
- Opened: 20 Khordad 1396 H-Sh (10 June 2017)
- Closed: 8 Aban 1396 H-Sh (30 October 2017)
- Rebuilt: 25 Esfand 1397 H-Sh (16 March 2019)

Services
Preceding station	Tehran Metro	Following station
Tehran Milad Tower towards Varzeshgah-e Takhti	Line 7	Shahid Dadman towards Meydan-e Ketab
Location

Meydan-e San'at Metro Station is a station in Tehran Metro Line 7. It is located on the northern edge of San'at Square, in Shahrak-e Gharb area of Tehran. It is the current northwestern terminus of Line 7.

== Building and Facilities ==
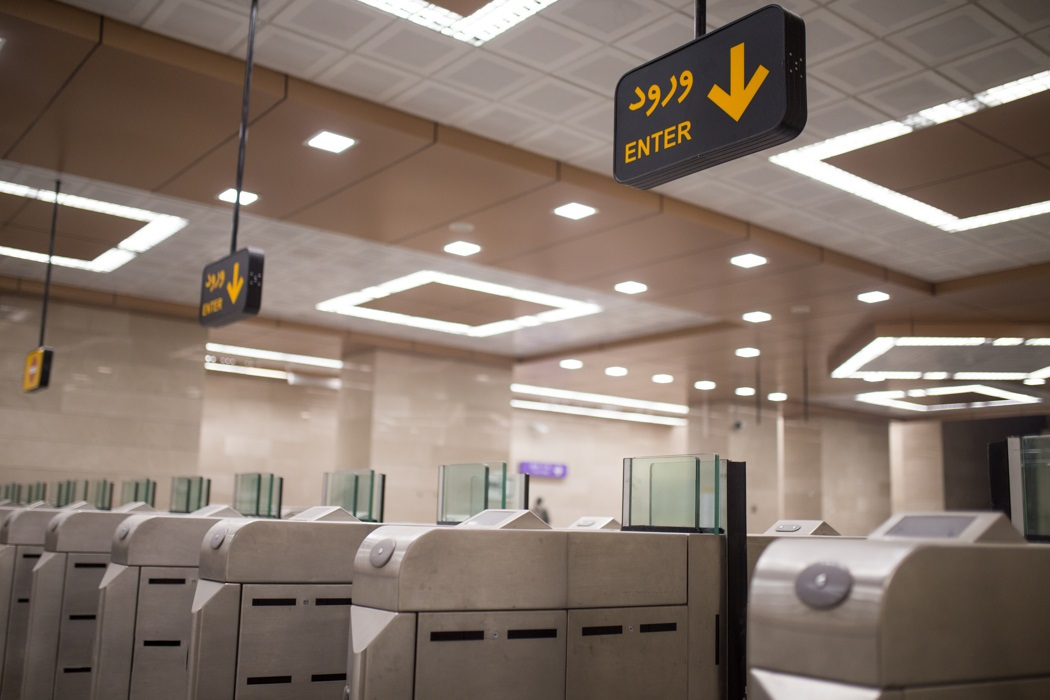

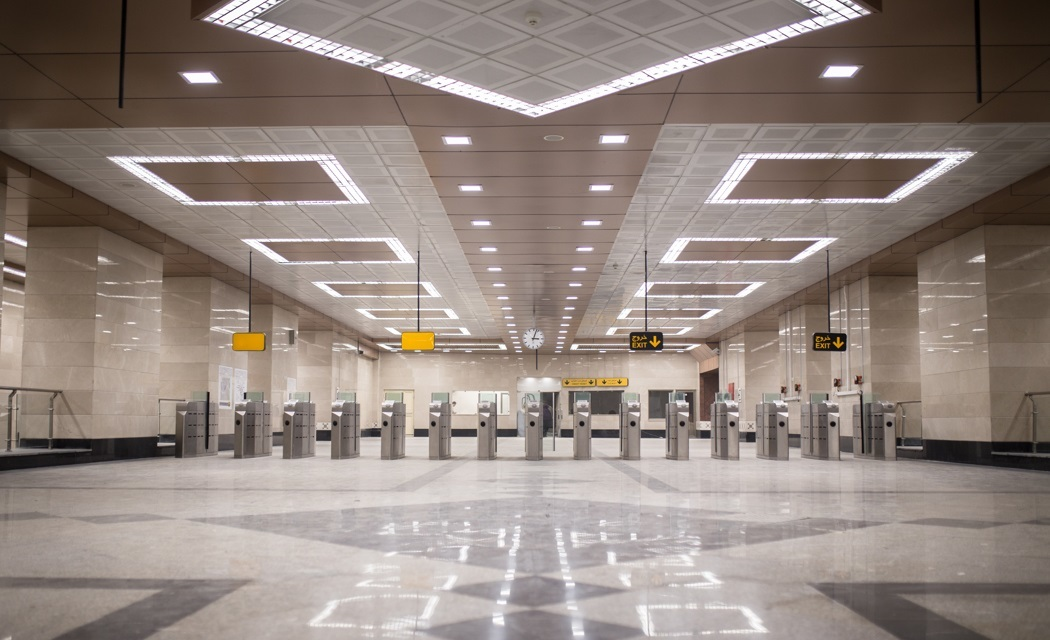
