= Helal-e Ahmar Metro Station =

Metro station in Tehran, Iran

Helal-e Ahmar Metro Station ایستگاه مترو هلال احمر

General information
- Location: Qazvin Street at Qadami Street, District 11, Tehran; Tehran Province, Iran
- Coordinates: 35.6678658°N 51.3874595°E
- System: Tehran Metro Station
- Operator: Tehran Urban and Suburban Railways Organization (Metro)
- Connections: Tehran BRT: BRT 2

History
- Opened: 25 Esfand 1397 H-Sh (16 March 2019)

Services
Preceding station	Tehran Metro	Following station
Mahdiyeh towards Varzeshgah-e Takhti	Line 7	Beryanak towards Meydan-e Ketab
Location

Helal-e Ahmar Metro Station is a station in Tehran Metro Line 7. It is located along Qazvin Street in Southwestern Central Tehran.
