= Komeyl Metro Station =

Station of the Tehran Metro

Komeyl Metro Station ایستگاه مترو کمیل

General information
- Location: Navvab Expressway, Districts 10-11, Tehran; Tehran Province, Iran
- Coordinates: 35.6827326°N 51.3796743°E
- System: Tehran Metro Station
- Operator: Tehran Urban and Suburban Railways Organization (Metro)
- Platforms: 2 Side platforms
- Tracks: 2

Construction
- Structure type: Underground

History
- Opened: 20 Khordad 1396 H-Sh (10 June 2017)
- Closed: 8 Aban 1396 H-Sh (30 October 2017)
- Rebuilt: 23 Tir 1397 H-Sh (14 July 2018)

Services
Preceding station	Tehran Metro	Following station
Beryanak towards Varzeshgah-e Takhti	Line 7	Roudaki towards Meydan-e Ketab
Location

Komeyl Metro Station is a station in Tehran Metro Line 7. It is located on the western side of khoshyaran street of Navvab Expressway.
