= Kiyan Shahr Metro Station =

Station of the Tehran Metro

Kiyan Shahr Metro Station ایستگاه مترو کیان‌شهر

General information
- Location: Salehi St. and Azizkhani St., Kiyanshahr, District 15, Tehran; Tehran Province, Iran
- Coordinates: 35°37′58″N 51°26′55″E
- System: Tehran Metro Station
- Operator: Tehran Urban and Suburban Railways Organization (Metro)

History
- Opened: 28 Bahman, 1398 H-Sh (February 17th, 2020)

Services
Preceding station	Tehran Metro	Following station
Besat towards Shahid Arman Aliverdi	Line 6	Dowlat Abad Terminus
Location

Kiyan Shahr Metro Station is a station of Tehran Metro Line 6. It is located at the junction of Salehi St. and Azizkhani St., two local streets in the neighbourhood of Kiyanshahr. The station primarily serves this neighbourhood, with no connection to other transit services. The closest bus stop is approximately 300 m to the north, where lines 316 Shush Metro-Kianshahr and 318 Khorasan Sq.-Kiyanshahr operate.
