= Mohammad Ali Afrashiteh =

Iranian poet (1908–1959)

Mohammad Ali Afrashiteh محمدعلی افراشته
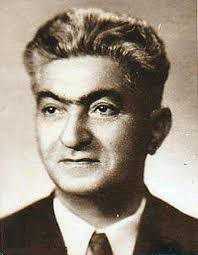
- Born: Mohammad Ali Rad Bazghaleh'i; 1908; Bazghaleh Sangar, Rasht, Iran
- Died: 7 May 1959 (aged 51); Sofia, Bulgaria
- Occupations: storyteller, journalist, satirist, poet, and author.
- Known for: He was known as a pioneer of Gilaki poetry and a significant contributor to Persian literature, especially in social satire.
- Political party: Tudeh Party of Iran

Mohammad Ali Afrashiteh (Persian: محمدعلی افراشته; 1908 – 7 May 1959) was a multifaceted Iranian literary figure, distinguished himself as a storyteller, journalist, satirist, poet, and author. Born as Mohammad Ali Rad Bazghaleh'i (Afrashiteh) to Haj Sheikh Javad Mojtahed Bazghaleh'i in the village of Bazghaleh Sangar, Rasht, he emerged as a trailblazer in Gilaki poetry and a significant contributor to Persian literature, particularly in the realm of social satire.

== Early life and career ==
From humble beginnings, Mohammad Ali Afrashiteh embarked on a diverse career path to sustain himself. His endeavors ranged from selling gypsum and apprenticing with construction companies to teaching, theater, sculpture, painting, and eventually, journalism and poetry. His journalistic journey commenced with the newspaper "Omid" in 1935. Between 1941 and 1948, his writings were published in the publications of Tudeh Party of Iran. later evolving into the establishment of his own publication, the Towfigh newspaper. The inception of his satirical newspaper, Chelangar, on March 8, 1951, marked a significant milestone in Iranian literature and journalism.

== Chelangar newspaper ==
Chelangar, priced at two rials for four pages, served as a platform for Afrashiteh's creative expressions, predominantly featuring his works and writings. This satirical and political newspaper quickly gained prominence, becoming a cornerstone of Iranian media. Afrashiteh's verse, "Beshkani ey qalam ey dast agar / Pich'i az khidmat-e mahruman sar," (O pen, O hand, if you refuse to serve the deprived, it is better to be broken) echoed through its pages, solidifying his reputation as a literary icon. However, the office of Chelangar on Navvab Street, also Afrashiteh's residence, fell victim to an attack by adversaries on 6 December 1951, resulting in its destruction.

Despite Chelangar's publication in Persian, Afrashiteh's passion for collecting local literature was evident. The newspaper dedicated a page to local literature, featuring poems in various regional languages. Afrashiteh's contributions to Gilaki poetry earned him a prominent place in this section. However, censorship ultimately led to the discontinuation of this feature, as Afrashiteh voiced his frustration over the suppression of local literary voices.

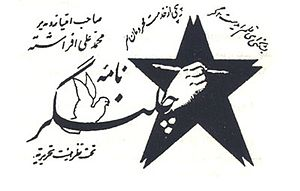
- Chelangar newspaper logo

The publication of Chelangar came to an abrupt halt following the coup d'état on 19 August 1953, marking the end of an era in Iranian journalism. Despite its demise, Chelangar's legacy as a platform for social commentary and satire endures, reflecting the turbulent socio-political landscape of its time.

== Legacy and later life ==
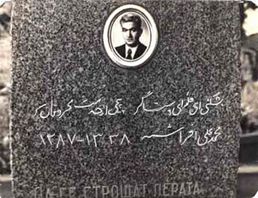
Tomb of Mohammad Ali Afrashiteh

Afrashiteh's literary contributions extended beyond journalism, encompassing short stories, poetry, and social commentary. During the era of oil industry nationalization and the national movement, his activism reached its zenith. Afrashiteh's commitment to social justice and his astute observations of Iranian society reverberated through his works, solidifying his legacy as a literary luminary.

Following the Islamic Revolution of Iran in 1979, Chelangar, as a legacy and memorial of him, experienced a brief resurgence but was ultimately shut down due to its perceived promotion of Marxist ideologies. Afrashiteh's own subsequent years were marked by exile and clandestine living, as he sought refuge abroad. Despite the challenges he faced, his literary endeavors continued, with his stories finding new audiences in Bulgaria.

== Migration and death ==
Afrashiteh lived in hiding from 1953 onwards, residing in humble dwellings similar to those depicted in his poetry. He eventually fled Iran, settling in Bulgaria under the pseudonym "Hassan Sharifi". His literary output continued in Bulgaria, where he wrote stories in Bulgarian for the magazine "Estreshl". Despite his exile, Afrashiteh's literary contributions endured, with his works transcending borders and languages.

Afrashiteh's life came to a close on May 7, 1959, at the age of 51, due to heart disease. He was laid to rest in Sofia, leaving behind a rich legacy of literature and social commentary. His tombstone bears his famous verse, a testament to his enduring impact on Iranian literature and journalism.
