= Darvazeh Shemiran Metro Station =

Station of the Tehran Metro

Darvazeh Shemiran ایستگاه مترو دروازه شمیران
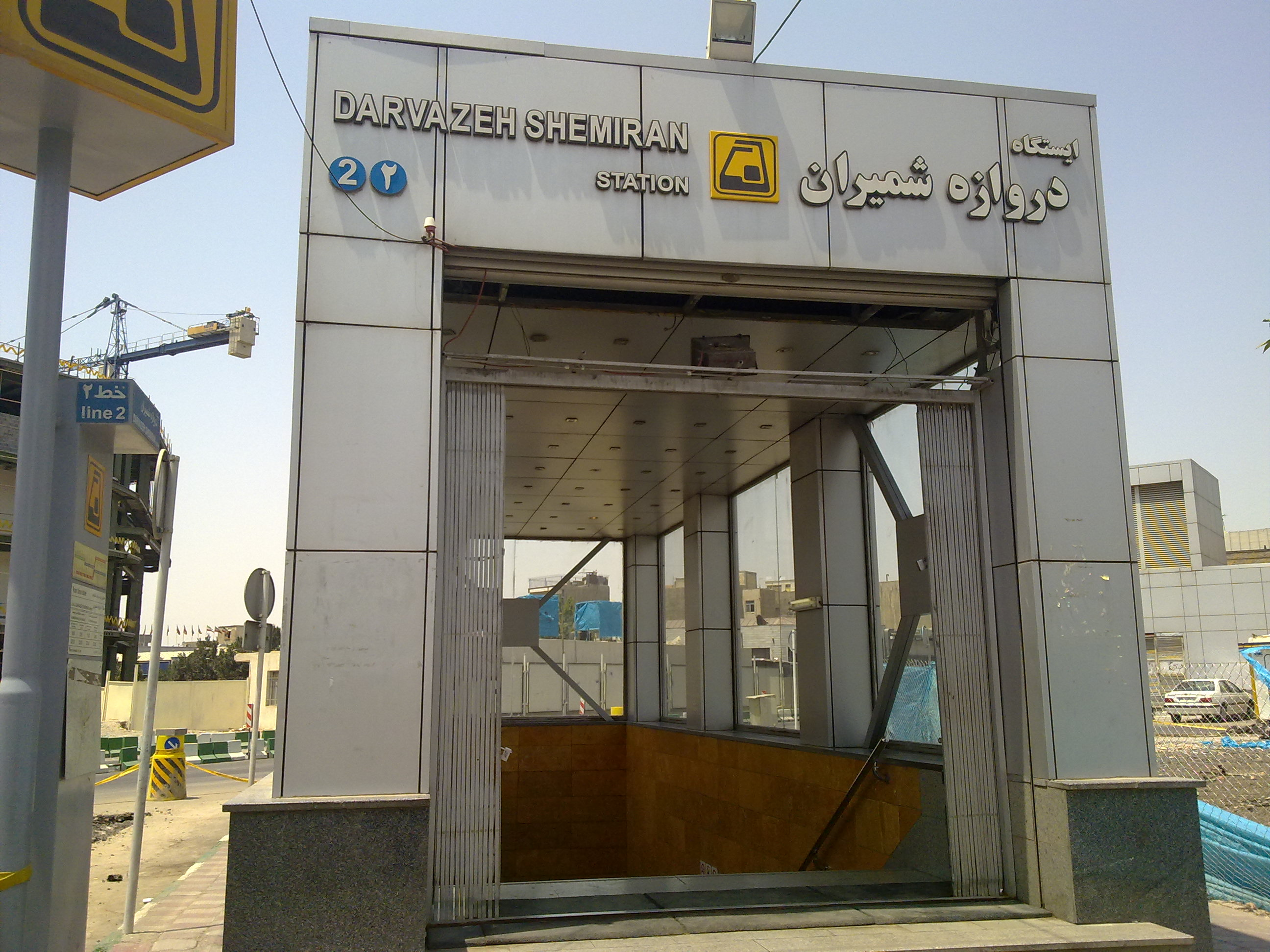

General information
- Location: Baharestan Street, District 12, Tehran; Tehran Province, Iran
- Coordinates: 35°42′06″N 51°25′34″E
- System: Tehran Metro Station
- Connections: Tehran Buses: 211 Baharestan Sq.-Mo'allem St.; 276 Khorasan Sq.- Enqelab Sq.; 278 Mahallati Term. - 7 Tir Sq.; 312 Resalat Sq. - Qiam Sq.

History
- Opened: 1385 H-Kh (2006); 1386 H-Kh (2007)

Services
Preceding station	Tehran Metro	Following station
Baharestan towards Tehran (Sadeghiyeh)	Line 2	Imam Hossein towards Farhangsara
Preceding station	Tehran Metro	Following station
Darvazeh Dowlat towards Allameh Jafari	Line 4	Meydan-e Shohada towards Shahid Kolahdooz
Location

Darvazeh Shemiran Metro Station is the junction of Tehran Metro Line 2 and Tehran Metro Line 4. It is located in junction of Baharestan Street and Mazandaran Street and Namjou Street nad Sepah Street. It is between Imam Hossein Metro Station and Baharestan Metro Station in Line 2 and Meydan-e Shohada Metro Station and Darvazeh Dowlat Metro Station in Line 4.
