= Nabard =

Nabard may refer to:

- Nabard Metro Station in Tehran, Iran
- Nabard Shahrekord F.C. in Shahrekord, Iran
- National Bank for Agriculture and Rural Development in India
