= Piroozi Metro Station =

Station of the Tehran Metro

Coordinates: 35.6902°N 51.4476°E

Piroozi Metro Station ایستگاه مترو پیروزی

General information
- Location: Piruzi Street, Districts 13-14, Tehran; Tehran Province, Iran
- System: Tehran Metro Station
- Operator: Tehran Urban and Suburban Railways Organization (Metro)
- Bus routes: Line 9

History
- Opened: 17 Dey, 1390 H-Kh (January 7th, 2010)

Services
| Preceding station | Tehran Metro | Following station |
|---|---|---|
| Ebn-e Sina towards Allameh Jafari | Line 4 | Nabard towards Shahid Kolahdooz |
Location

Piroozi Metro Station is a station of Tehran Metro Line 4. It is located in Piruzi street.
