= Beryanak Metro Station =

Station of the Tehran Metro

Beryanak Metro Station ایستگاه مترو بریانک

General information
- Location: Navvab Expressway, District 10, Tehran; Tehran Province, Iran
- Coordinates: 35.6723201°N 51.3806077°E
- System: Tehran Metro Station
- Operator: Tehran Urban and Suburban Railways Organization (Metro)

History
- Opened: Tir 1396 H-Sh (July 2017)
- Closed: 8 Aban 1396 H-Sh (30 October 2017)
- Rebuilt: 23 Tir 1397 H-Sh (14 July 2018)

Services
| Preceding station | Tehran Metro | Following station |
|---|---|---|
| Helal-e Ahmar towards Varzeshgah-e Takhti | Line 7 | Komeyl towards Meydan-e Ketab |
Location

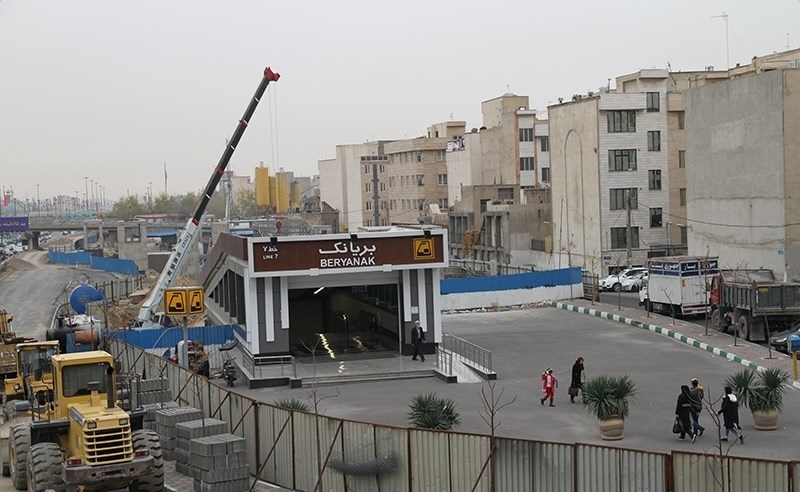
Beryanak Metro Station

Beryanak Metro Station is a station in Tehran Metro Line 7. It is located on the western side of Navvab Expressway. In 2022 a new gate was made south of the old one.
