= Bdood =

Bicycle sharing company in Tehran, Iran

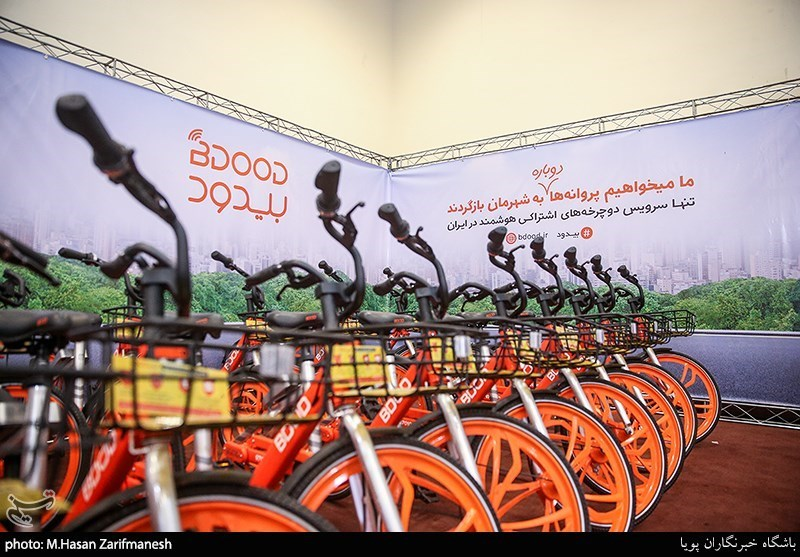
- A set of BDOOD bikes on display
- Native name: بیدود
- Company type: Private
- Industry: Transportation
- Founded: 2017; 9 years ago
- Headquarters: Tehran, Iran
- Areas served: Tehran; Shiraz
- Products: Bicycle sharing services
- Parent: پاک چرخ ایرانیان (Paak Charkh Iranian Co.)
- Website: www.bdood.ir

Bdood is a dockless bike-sharing company, located in Tehran, Iran. First featured in Iranian tech exhibition Elecomp 97 in 2018, it claims to be the first bike-sharing business in Iran.

== History ==
After being featured in the 2018 Elecomp, an Iranian technology exhibition, it officially started operating in District 2 of Tehran on December 18, 2018. Initially, its business model was a combination of subscription and pay-as-you-go. Charging an initial refundable deposit of 159,000 IRT, with a required insurance fee of 30,900 IRT, its registration cost added up to 189,900 IRT. It also charged the subscribed users 1,500 IRT for every 30 minutes they were using the bikes.

=== 2019 Bike re-collection ===
Following the 2019–2020 Iranian protests, BDOOD bikes across Tehran were collected and removed from the stations. Chief of Communication and International Relations of Tehran municipality tweeted that the bikes were collected to avoid damages due to the recent events. Two months later, it was announced that the company had started refunding the deposit it received from its customers.

== Usage ==
Use of the system requires the firm's mobile application, registration and payment of a deposit.

== See also ==
- Bicycle-sharing system
- List of bicycle-sharing systems
