= Tarasht Metro Station =

Station of the Tehran Metro

Tarasht Metro Station ایستگاه مترو طرشت

General information
- Location: Chubtarash Street- Golab Street; District 2, Tehran, Tehran County; Iran
- Coordinates: 35.7161°N 51.3435°E
- System: Tehran Metro Station
- Operator: Tehran Urban and Suburban Railways Organization (Metro)

History
- Opened: 21 February 2000

Services
Preceding station	Tehran Metro	Following station
Tehran (Sadeghiyeh) Terminus	Line 2	Daneshgah-e Sharif towards Farhangsara
Location

Tarasht Metro Station is a station on Tehran Metro Line 2. It is located on Shahid Golab Street. It is between the Sharif University Metro Station and the Sadeghieh (Tehran) Metro Station.

In 2005, the radon concentration was measured at this station and found to be 9 Bq/m^{3}. The threshold permissible concentration is 148 Bq/m^{3}.
