= Shahid Navvab-e Safavi Metro Station =

Station of the Tehran Metro

Shahid Navvab-e Safavi Metro Station ایستگاه مترو شهید نواب صفوی

General information
- Location: Navvab Expressway- Azarbaijan Street; Districts 10-11, Tehran, Tehran County; Iran
- Coordinates: 35.6955°N 51.3782°E
- System: Tehran Metro Station
- Operator: Tehran Urban and Suburban Railways Organization (Metro)
- Platforms: 2 Side Platforms Tehran Metro Line 2 2 Side Platforms Tehran Metro Line 7
- Tracks: 4
- Connections: Tehran BRT: BRT 4

Construction
- Structure type: Underground
- Platform levels: 2

History
- Opened: (21 February 2000) (10 June 2017)
- Closed: (30 October 2017)
- Rebuilt: (14 July 2018)

Services
| Preceding station | Tehran Metro | Following station |
|---|---|---|
| Shademan towards Tehran (Sadeghiyeh) | Line 2 | Meydan-e Horr towards Farhangsara |
| Roudaki towards Varzeshgah-e Takhti | Line 7 | Towhid towards Meydan-e Ketab |
Location

Shahid Navvab-e Safavi Metro Station is a station in Tehran Metro Line 2 and Line 7. It is located in the junction of Navvab Expressway and Azarbayjan Street. It is between Hor Square Metro Station and Shademan Metro Station (Formerly known as Azadi Station)in line 2 and between roudaki metro station and towhid metro station in Line 7 (purple). It is named after Navvab Safavi. The station also serve Line 7.
