= Daneshgah-e Sharif Metro Station =

Station of the Tehran Metro

Daneshgah-e Sharif Metro Station ایستگاه مترو دانشگاه شریف

General information
- Location: Teimuri Street; Sharif University of Technology; District 2, Tehran, Tehran County; Iran
- Coordinates: 35.7058°N 51.3536°E
- System: Tehran Metro Station
- Operator: Tehran Urban and Suburban Railways Organization (Metro)

History
- Opened: 21 February 2000

Services
Preceding station	Tehran Metro	Following station
Tarasht towards Tehran (Sadeghiyeh)	Line 2	Shademan towards Farhangsara
Location

Sharif University Metro Station is a station on Tehran Metro Line 2. It is located at the junction of Sohravard Street and Dr. Habibollah Street. It is near Yadegar-e-Emam Expressway and Sharif University of Technology. It is between Shademan Metro Station (formerly known as Azadi Station) and Tarasht Metro Station.
