= Mahdiyeh Metro Station =

Station of the Tehran Metro

Mahdiyeh Metro Station ایستگاه مترو مهدیه

General information
- Location: Valiasr Street- Molavi Street, District 11, Tehran, Tehran County; Tehran Province, Iran
- System: Tehran Metro Station
- Operator: Tehran Urban and Suburban Railways Organization (Metro)

History
- Opened: 23 Tir 1397 H-Kh (14 July 2018)

Services
Preceding station	Tehran Metro	Following station
Moniriyeh towards Ghaem	Line 3	Rahahan towards Azadegan
Meydan-e Mohammadiyeh towards Varzeshgah-e Takhti	Line 7	Helal-e Ahmar towards Meydan-e Ketab
Location

Mahdiyeh Metro Station is a station in line 3 of the Tehran Metro. It is located at the intersection of Valiasr Street and Molavi Street. The station will also serve Line 7, open on 14 July 2018, the date at which this station will also become operational.
