= Nirooye Havaei Metro Station =

Station of the Tehran Metro

Coordinates: 35.6990°N 51.4986°E

Nirooye Havaei Metro Station ایستگاه متروی نیروهوایی

General information
- Location: Piruzi Street, Districts 13-14, Tehran; Tehran Province, Iran
- System: Tehran Metro Station
- Operator: Tehran Urban and Suburban Railways Organization (Metro)
- Platforms: Side platform

Construction
- Structure type: Underground

History
- Opened: 1391 H-Kh (2012)

Services
Preceding station	Tehran Metro	Following station
Nabard towards Allameh Jafari	Line 4	Shahid Kolahdooz Terminus
Location

Nirooye Havaei Metro Station is a station of Tehran Metro Line 4. It is located in Piruzi street.
