= Chelangar =

Iranian satirical and political newspaper

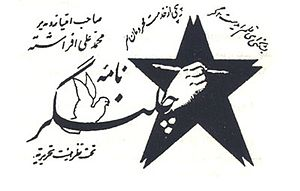
- Type: Critical and humorous newspaper
- Format: Broadsheet
- Founder(s): Mohammad Ali Afrashiteh fa
- Founded: 8 March 1951
- Political alignment: Left-wing politics
- Language: Persian
- Ceased publication: coup d'état on 19 August 1953
- City: Tehran
- Country: Iran

Chelangar (Persian: چلنگر) was an Iranian satirical and political newspaper published between the years 1951 and 1953 (Persian calendar years 1329–1332). The word "Chelangar" translates to "locksmith" or "key maker" in Persian, referring to someone who crafts small iron objects such as nails, chains, and other intricate items.

== History ==
Founded by Mohammad Ali Afrashiteh, Chelangar made its debut on 8 March 1951 (17 Esfand 1329 in the Persian calendar). Priced at two rials and spanning four pages, the newspaper predominantly featured poems and articles authored by Afrashiteh himself. One of Afrashiteh's verses, "Beshkani ey qalam ey dast agar / Peychi az khedmat-e mahrooman sar," (O pen, O hand, if you refuse to serve the deprived, it is better to be broken). became a headline for years and its publication marked a significant event in the realms of Iranian poetry and journalism.

Chelangar primarily circulated in the Persian language, but from its inaugural issue, it dedicated a page to regional literature. This page showcased poetry in various Iranian ethnic languages such as Gilaki, Azerbaijani, Kurdish, Turkmen, Lori, Mazandarani, and more. Given Afrashiteh's prominence in Gilaki poetry, a considerable portion of the page was allocated to Gilaki poetry initially. However, after a while, Afrashiteh announced the discontinuation of this section, citing censorship as the reason.

The office of Chelangar was situated on Navvab Street. However, on 6 December 1951 (14 Azar 1330 in the Persian calendar), it fell victim to an attack by thugs and opponents, resulting in the destruction of all its assets.

The publication of Chelangar came to an abrupt halt following the coup d'état on 19 August 1953 (28 Mordad 1332 in the Persian calendar).
