= Moniriyeh Metro Station =

Station of the Tehran Metro

Moniriyeh Metro Station ایستگاه مترو منیریه

General information
- Location: Moniriyeh Square, District 11, Tehran, Tehran County; Tehran Province, Iran
- System: Tehran Metro Station
- Operator: Tehran Urban and Suburban Railways Organization (Metro)
- Connections: Tehran BRT: BRT 7 · 107 Rahahan-Tajrish · 152 Rahahan-Parkway

History
- Opened: 2 Ordibehesht 1393 H-Kh (April 22, 2014)

Services
Preceding station	Tehran Metro	Following station
Teatr-e Shahr towards Ghaem	Line 3	Mahdiyeh towards Azadegan
Location

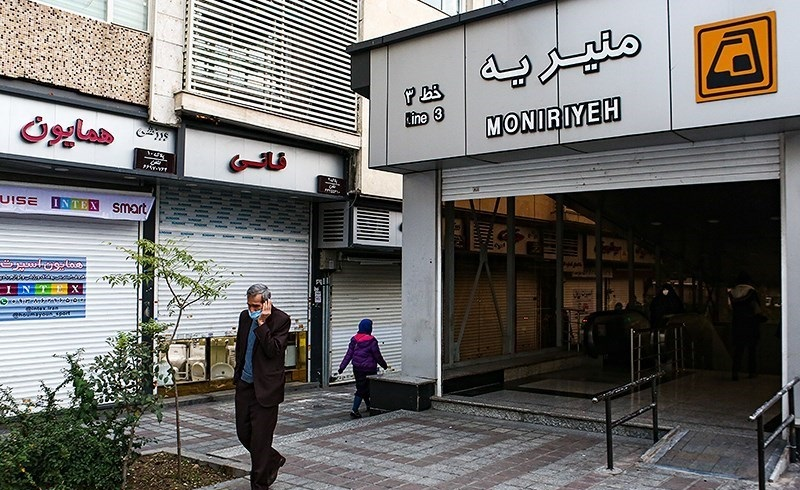
Moniriyeh Metro Station entrance

Moniriyeh Metro Station is a station in line 3 of the Tehran Metro. It is located in Moniriyeh Square.
