= Holy Mary Metro Station =

Metro station in Tehran, Iran

Holy Mary (Shahid Nejatollahi) Metro Station ایستگاه مترو مریم مقدس (شهید نجات‌اللهی)
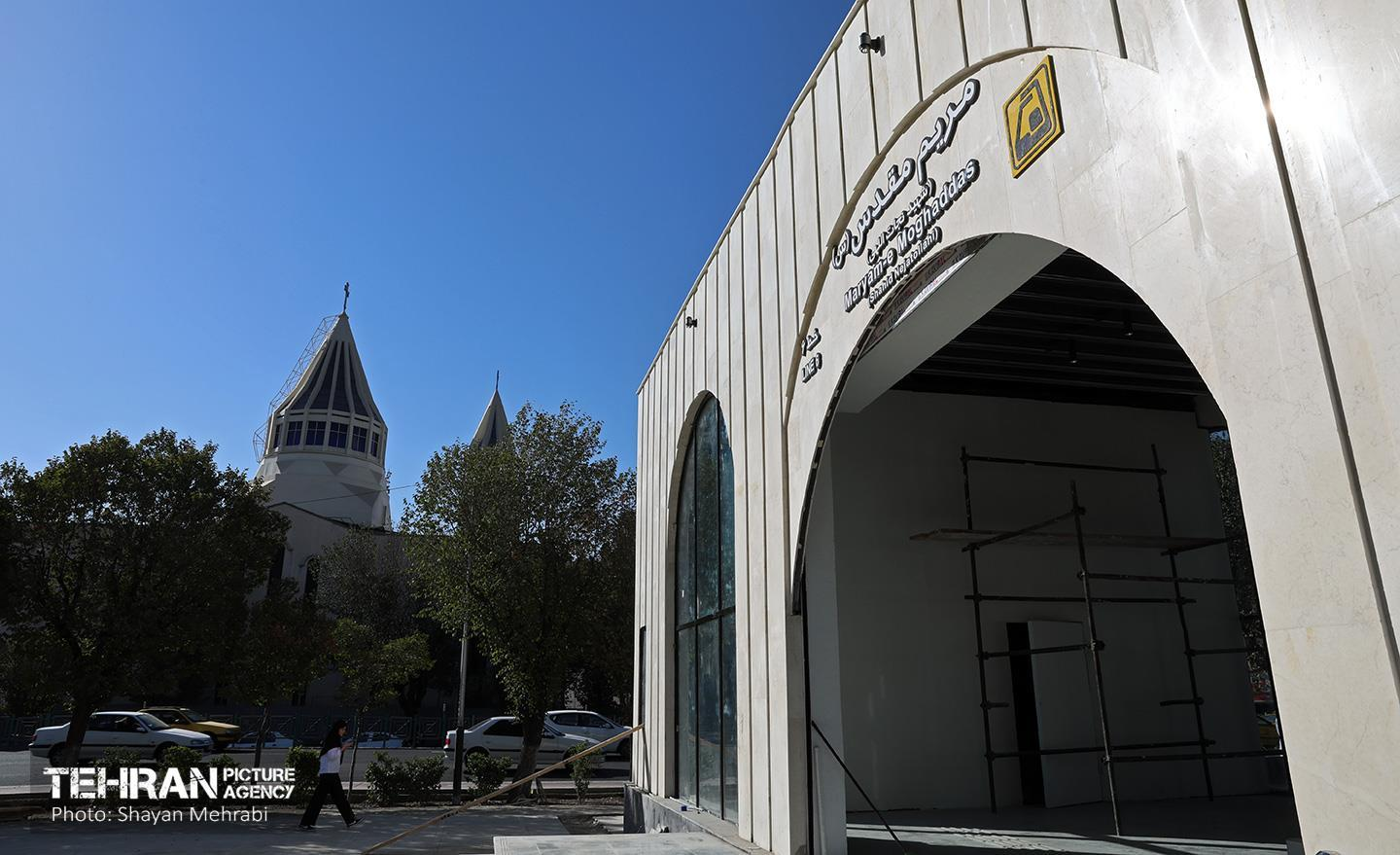
- Holy Mary (Shahid Nejatollahi) station platforms

General information
- Location: The station is situated at the junction of Nejatollahi and Karimkhan Zand Streets, close to Saint Sarkis Cathedral, Tehran; Iran
- Line: Line 6 Tehran Metro
- Platforms: 2 side platforms

History
- Opened: 29 November 2025

Key dates
- 2015: Start building
Location

Holy Mary (Shahid Nejatollahi) Metro Station, named Maryam-e Moghaddas in Persian, is a stop on Tehran Metro Line 6. Construction began in 2015, and the station is situated at the junction of Nejatollahi and Karimkhan Zand Streets, close to St. Sarkis, an Armenian Apostolic cathedral. It features Christian and Armenian imagery.

It was officially unveiled on 29 November 2025. In Iran, Shia Islam is the official state religion, nevertheless, the Constitution acknowledges Sunni Islam, Zoroastrianism, Judaism, and Christianity as minority religions, each having its own representative in the Islamic Consultative Assembly. During the opening ceremony, Tehran Mayor Alireza Zakani said, "This station honors the sacred woman who, with her purity and by raising a great prophet, enlightened the world. The structure is designed to represent the harmony of divine religions in Tehran."

== Details and design ==
The station is built 34 meters underground and spans around 11,000 square meters. Its construction required over 100,000 cubic meters of excavation, 3,600 tons of reinforcing steel, and 27,000 cubic meters of concrete. Additionally, the station includes 12 escalators and has about 6,000 square meters of stone cladding on its interior walls and surfaces.

Within the station, several relief sculptures are showcased:

- Jesus Christ overseeing the travelers
- Mary, mother of Jesus shown with closed eyes and hands folded in prayer, a prominent halo above her head, and encircled by tulips, emblems of faithful and eternal love in Islam.

According to the artist, Tina Tarigh Mehr, the white dove symbolizes the Holy Spirit, and the olive tree represents peace and friendship. The Catholic Archbishop of Tehran–Isfahan, Cardinal Dominique Mathieu found that while the “gazes of Jesus Christ and His Mother, the Blessed Virgin Mary, are fixed on the commuters,” their closed eyelids exchange glances with them, “except that of the ‘eye of the dove.'”

== Gallery ==
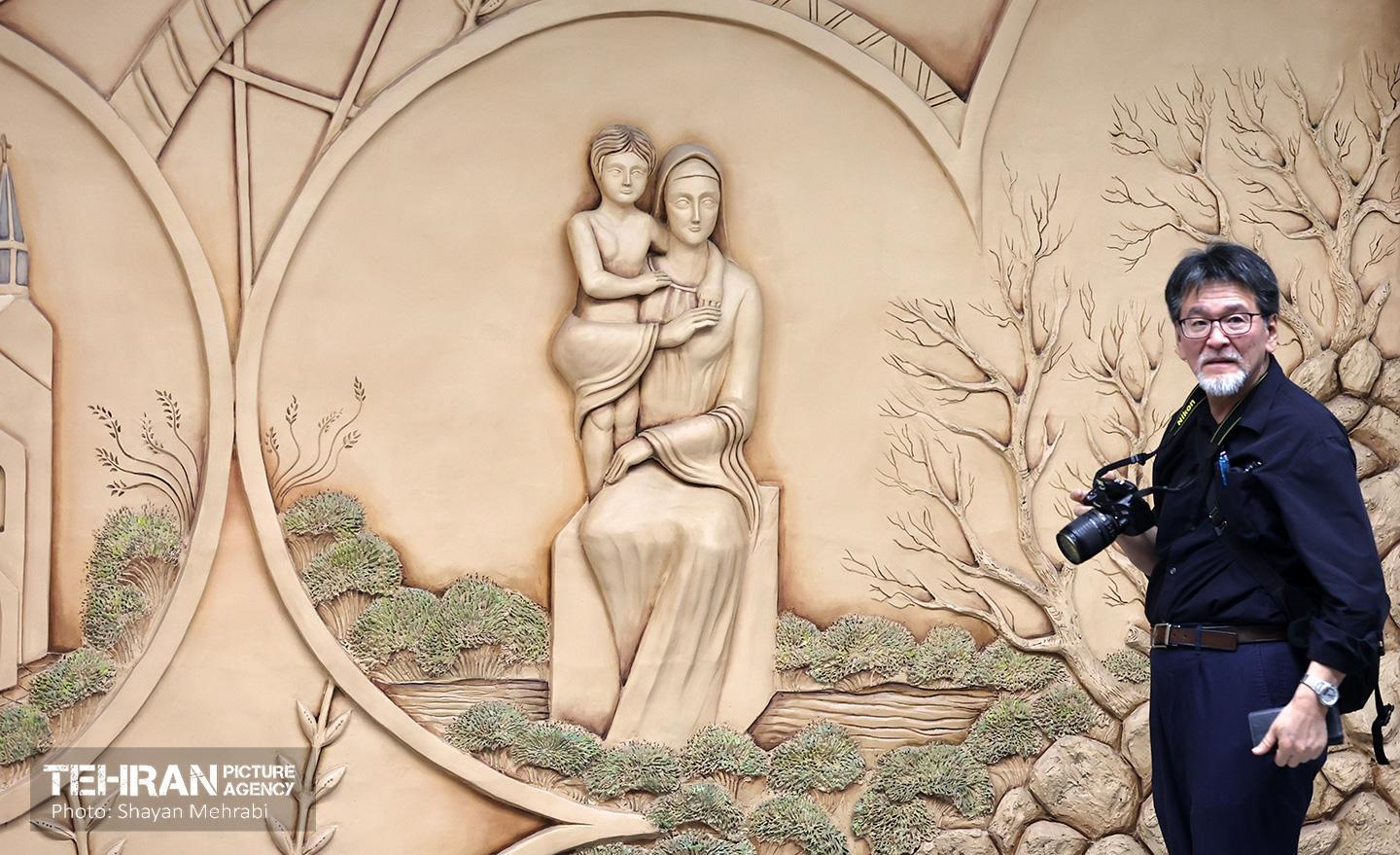

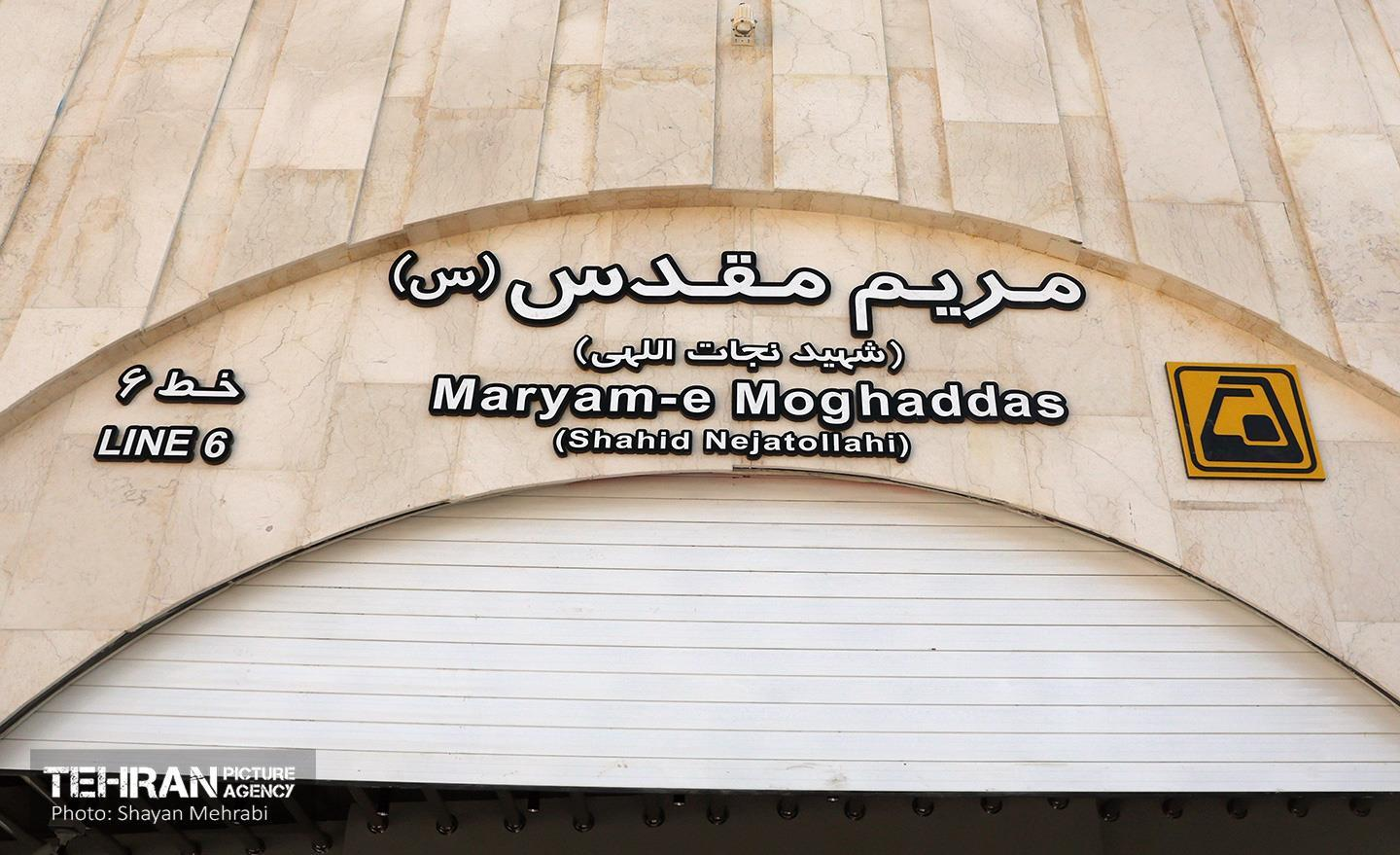

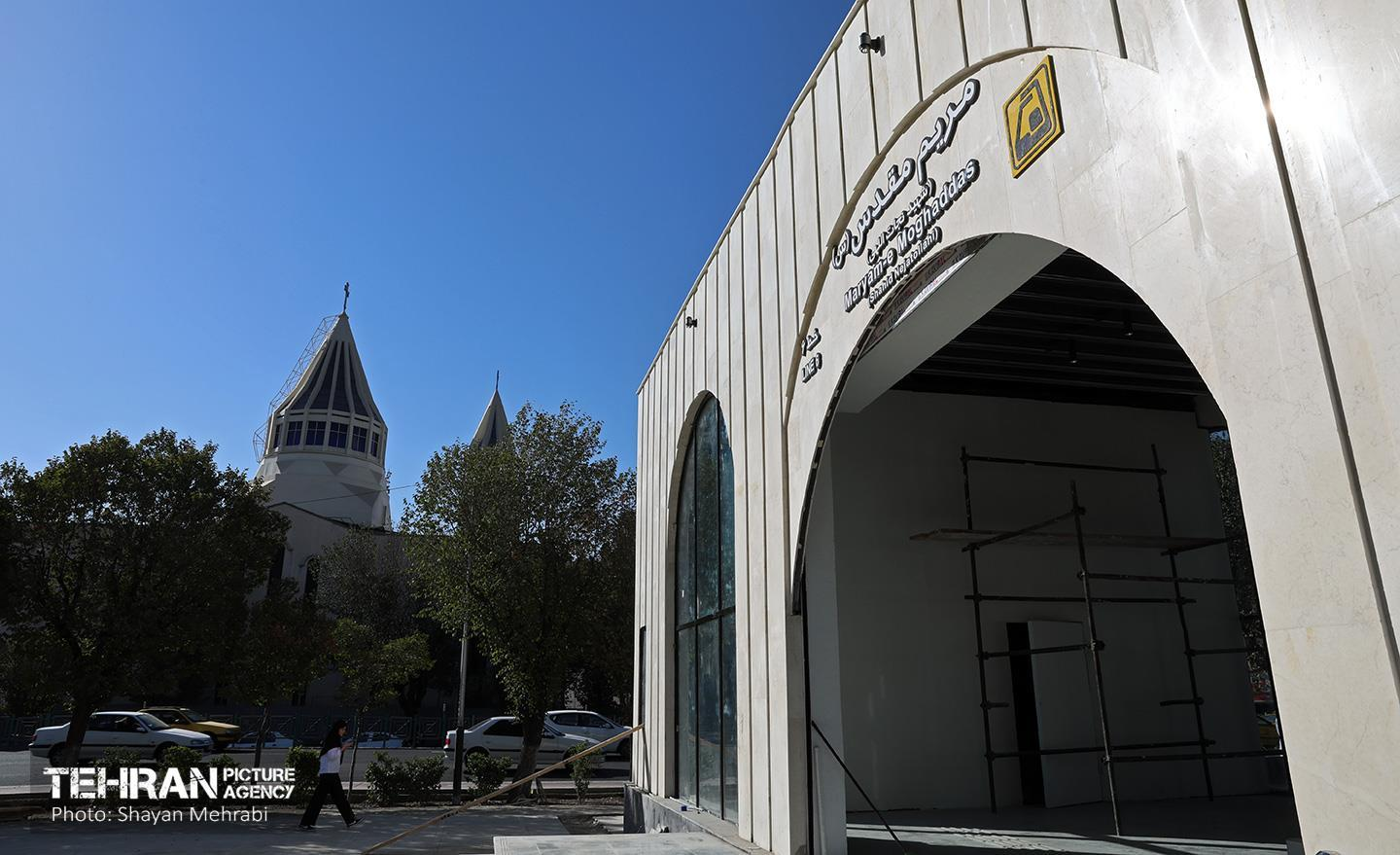

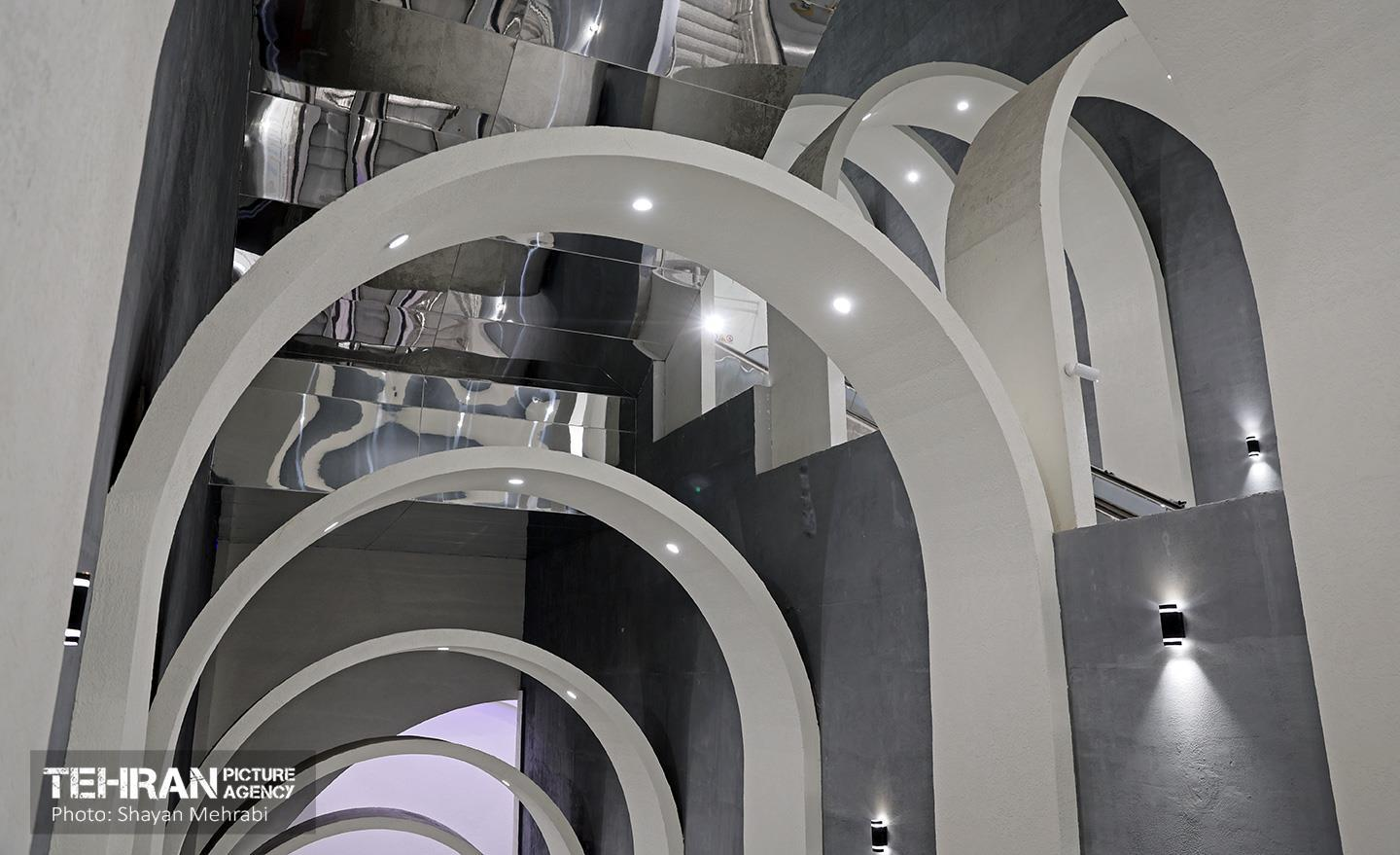

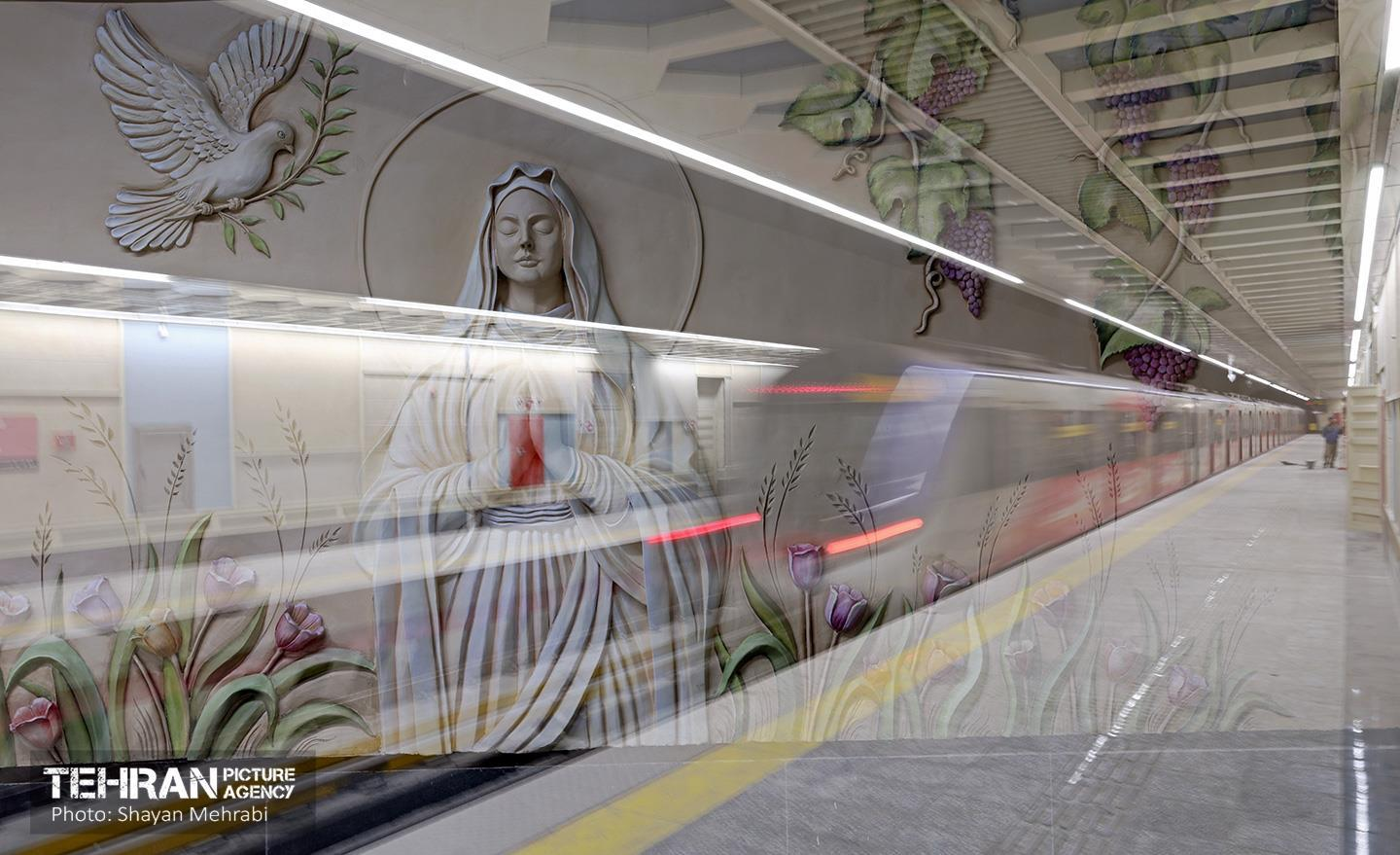

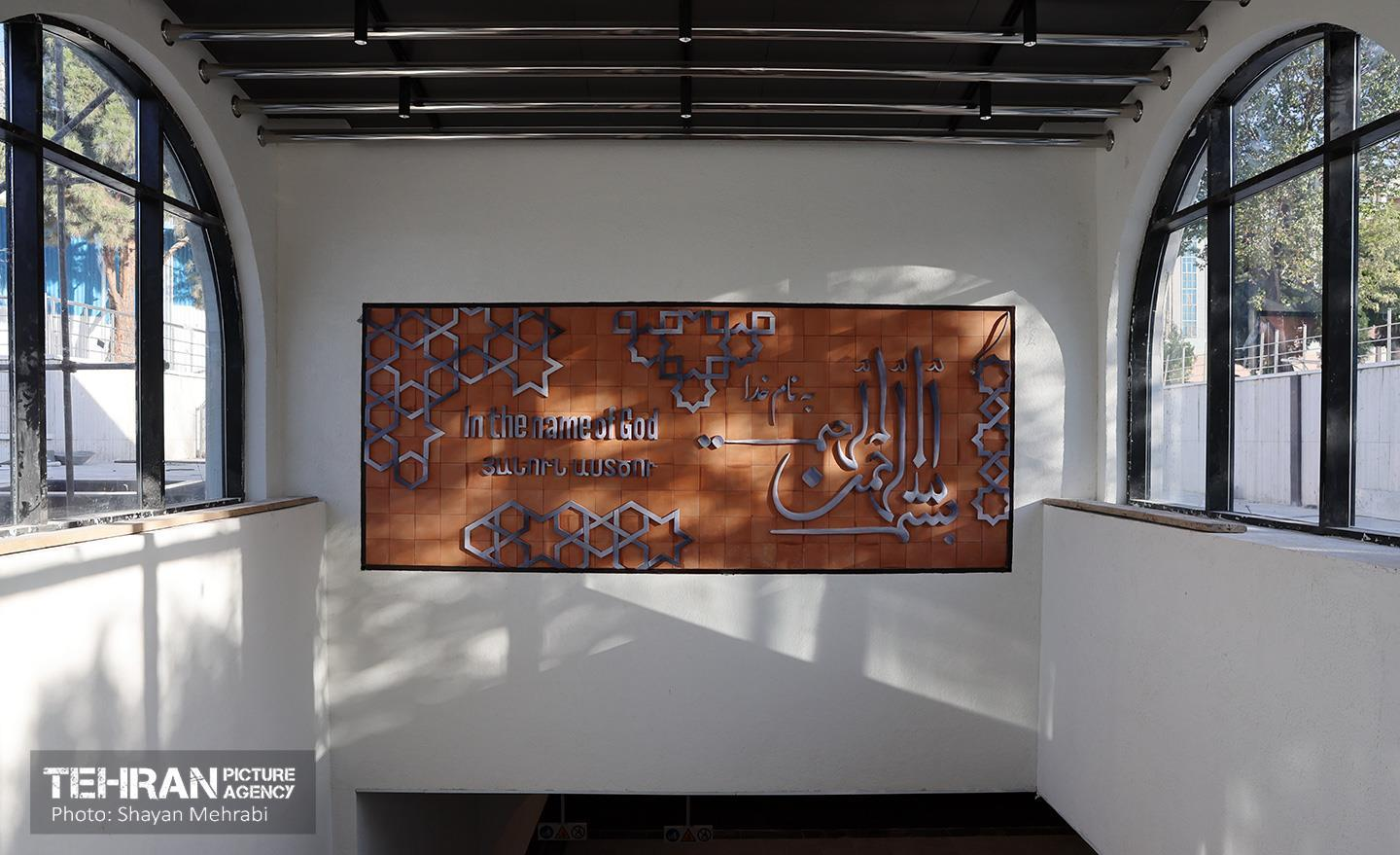

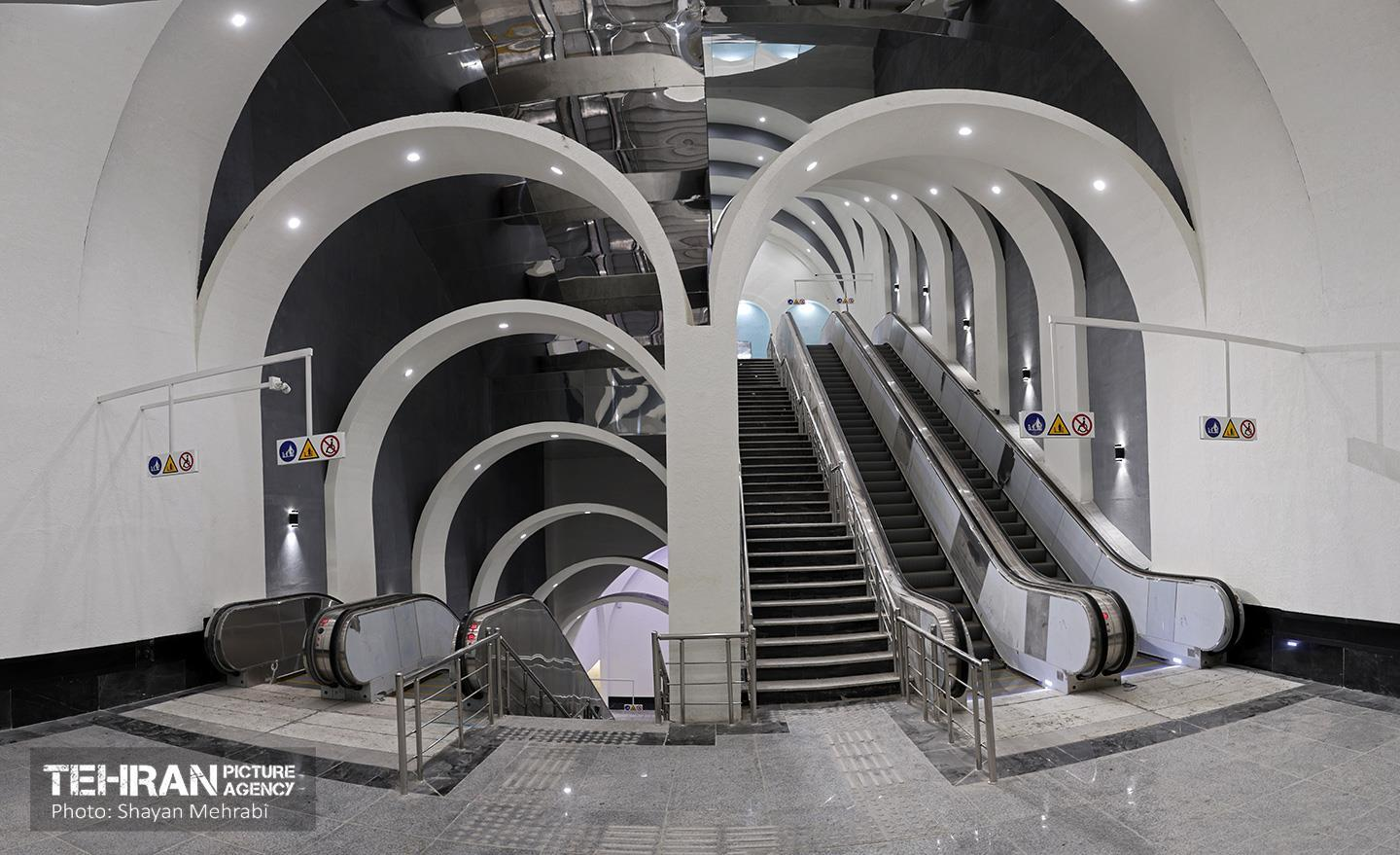

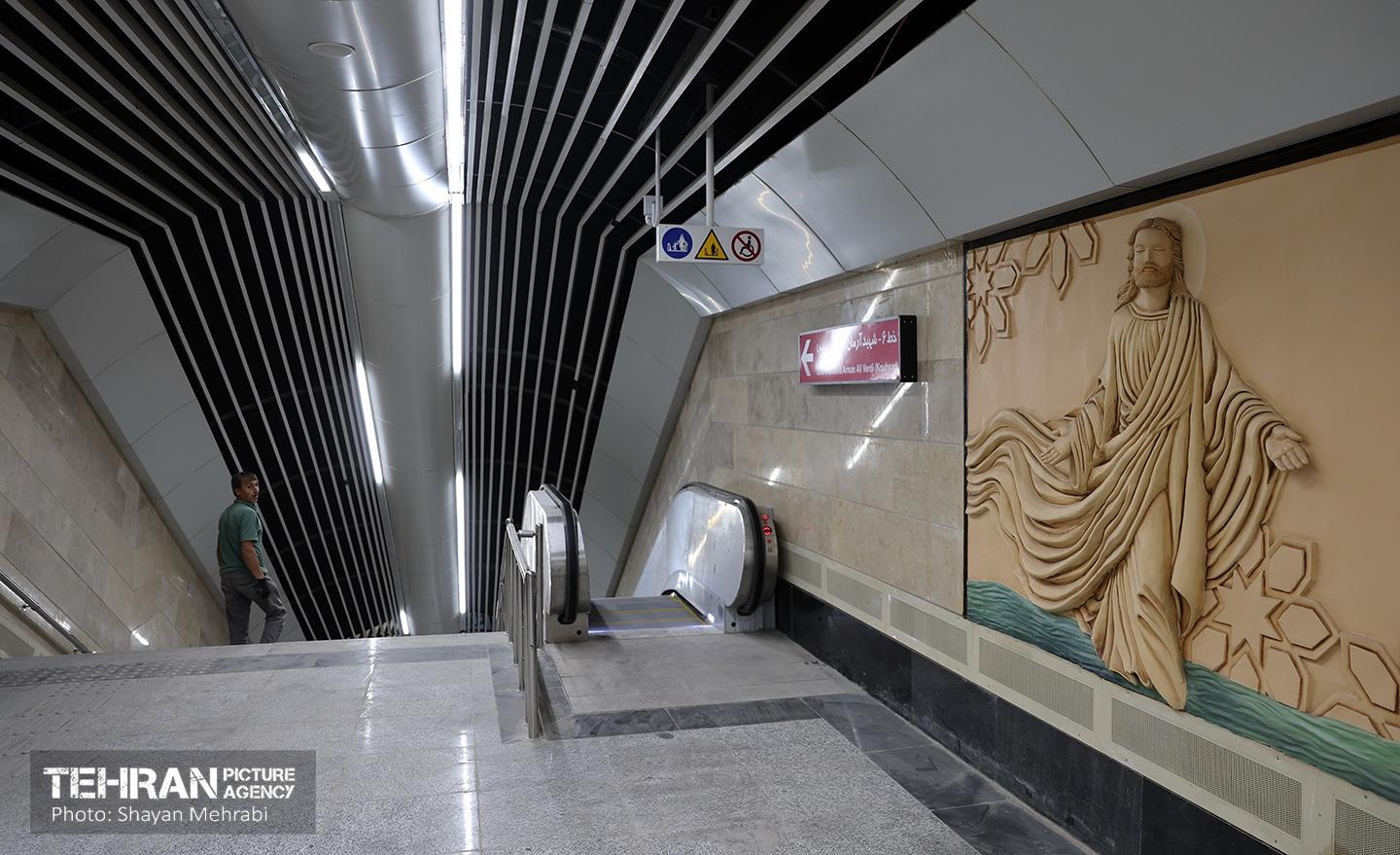

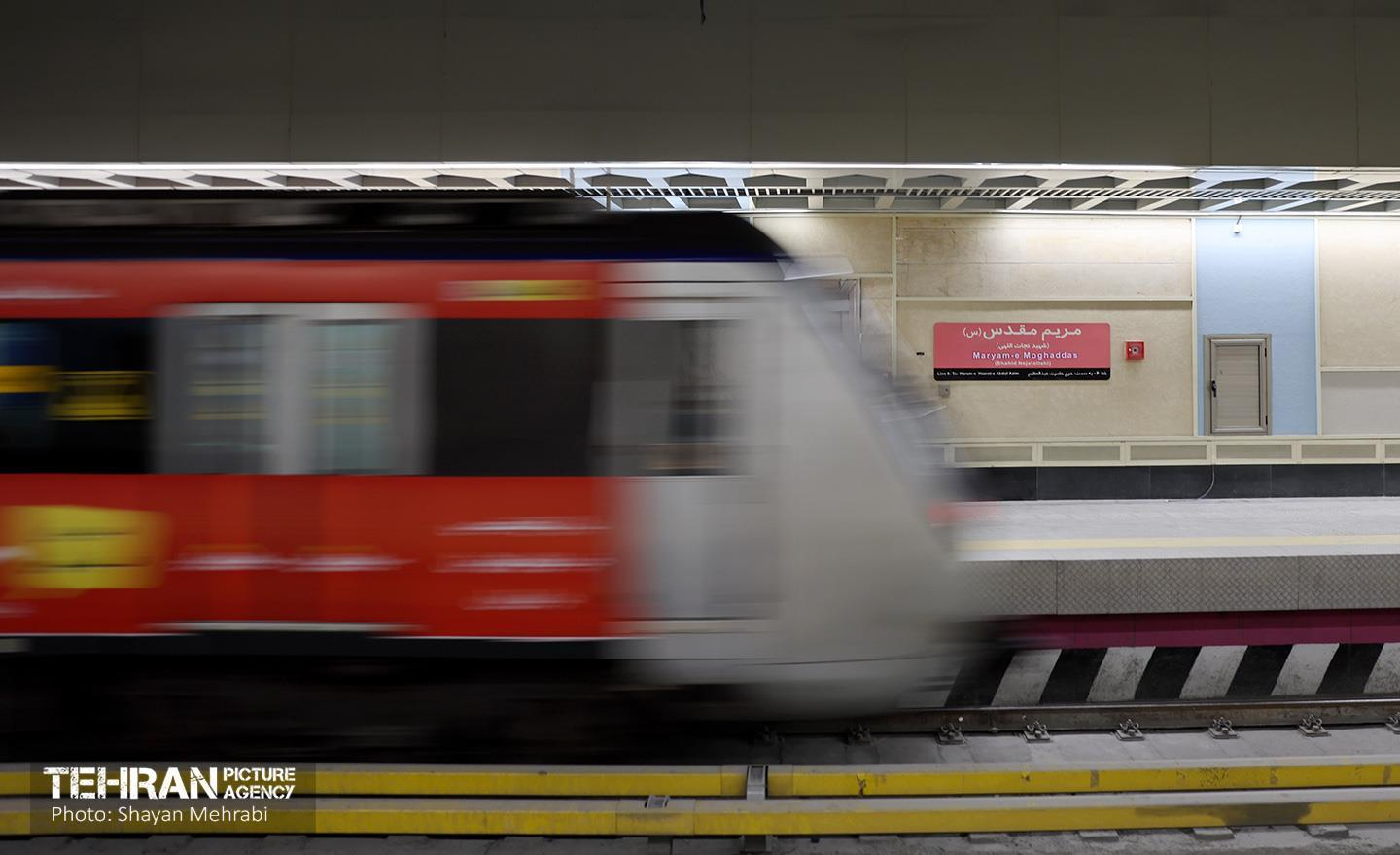

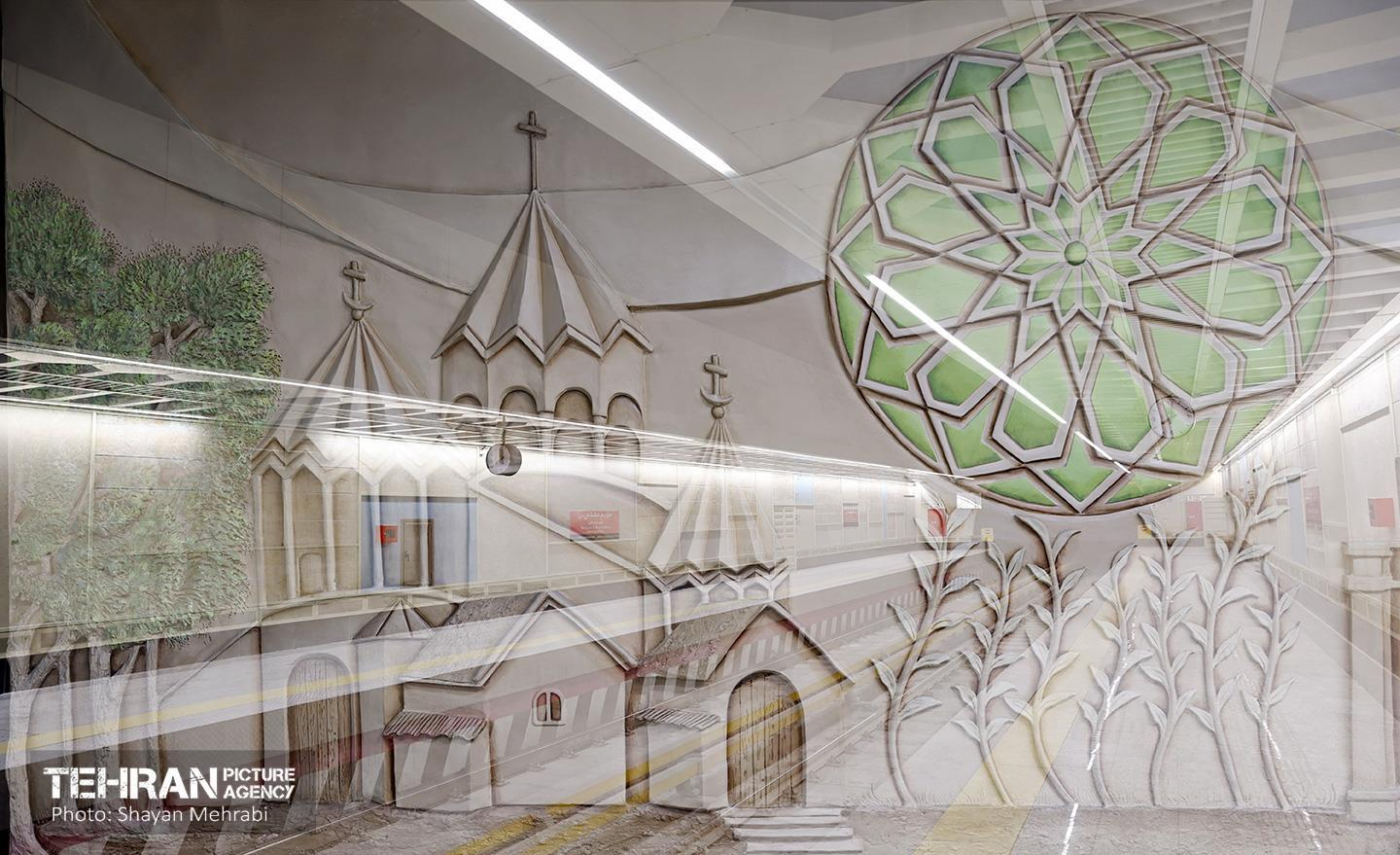

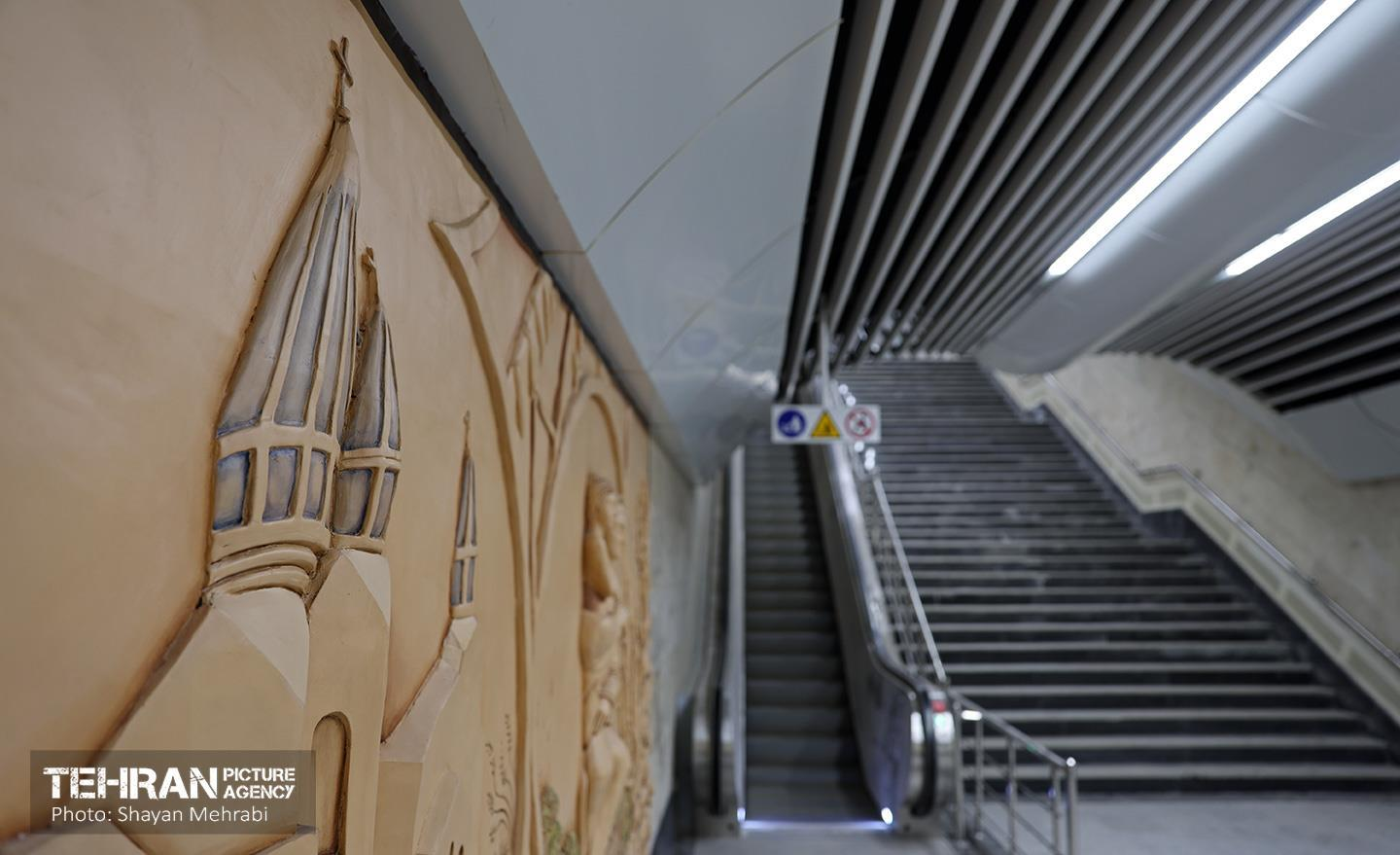

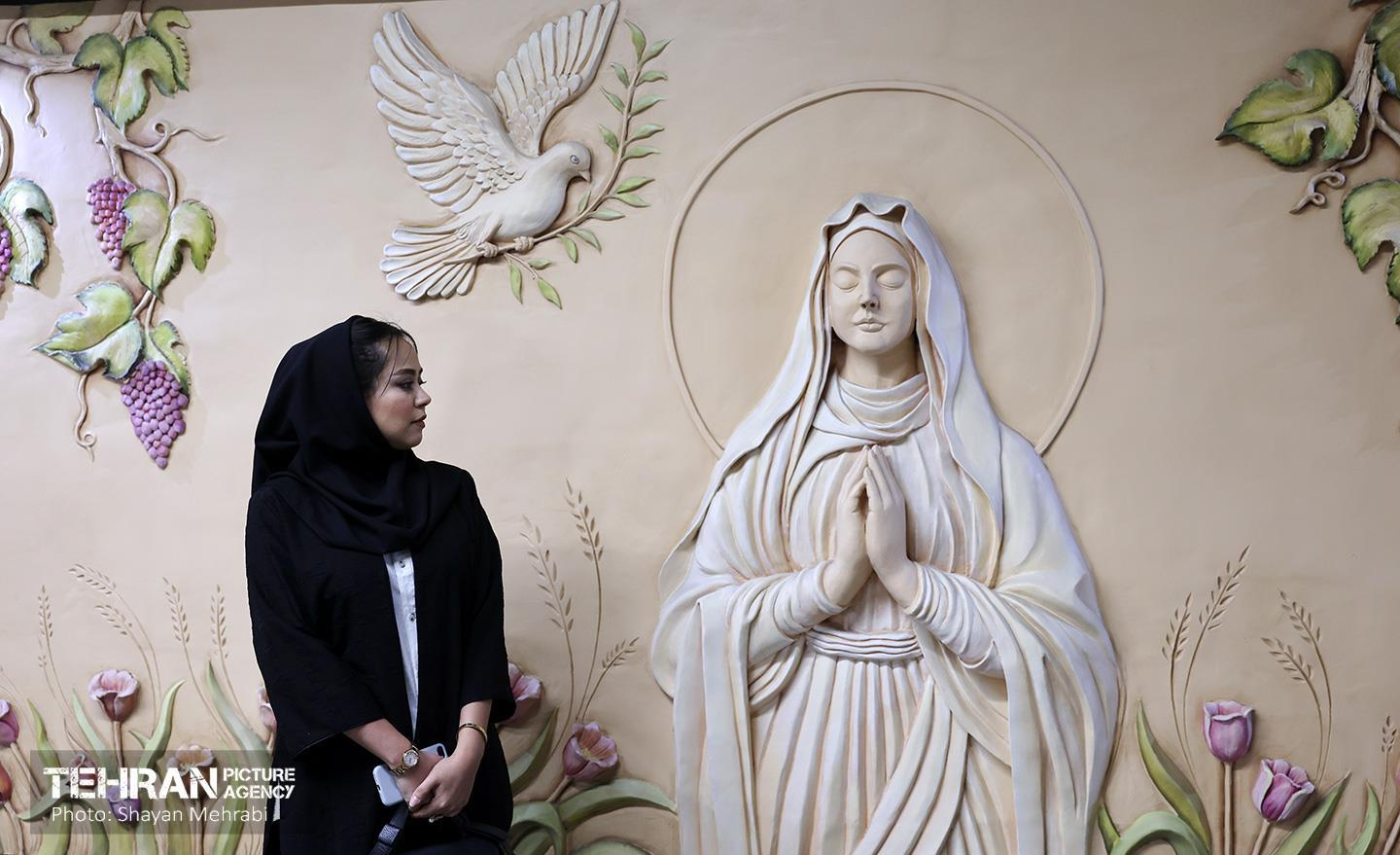

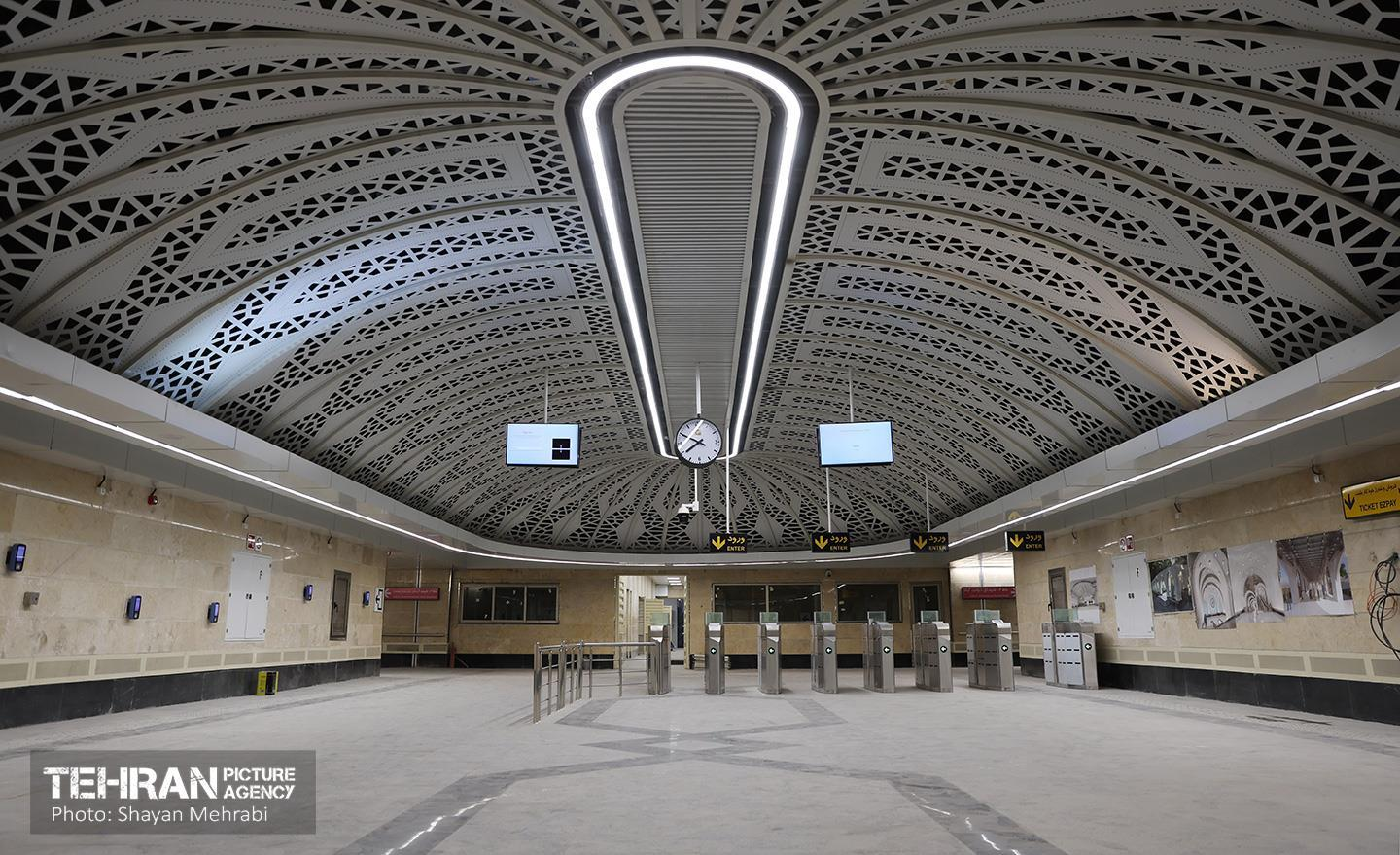

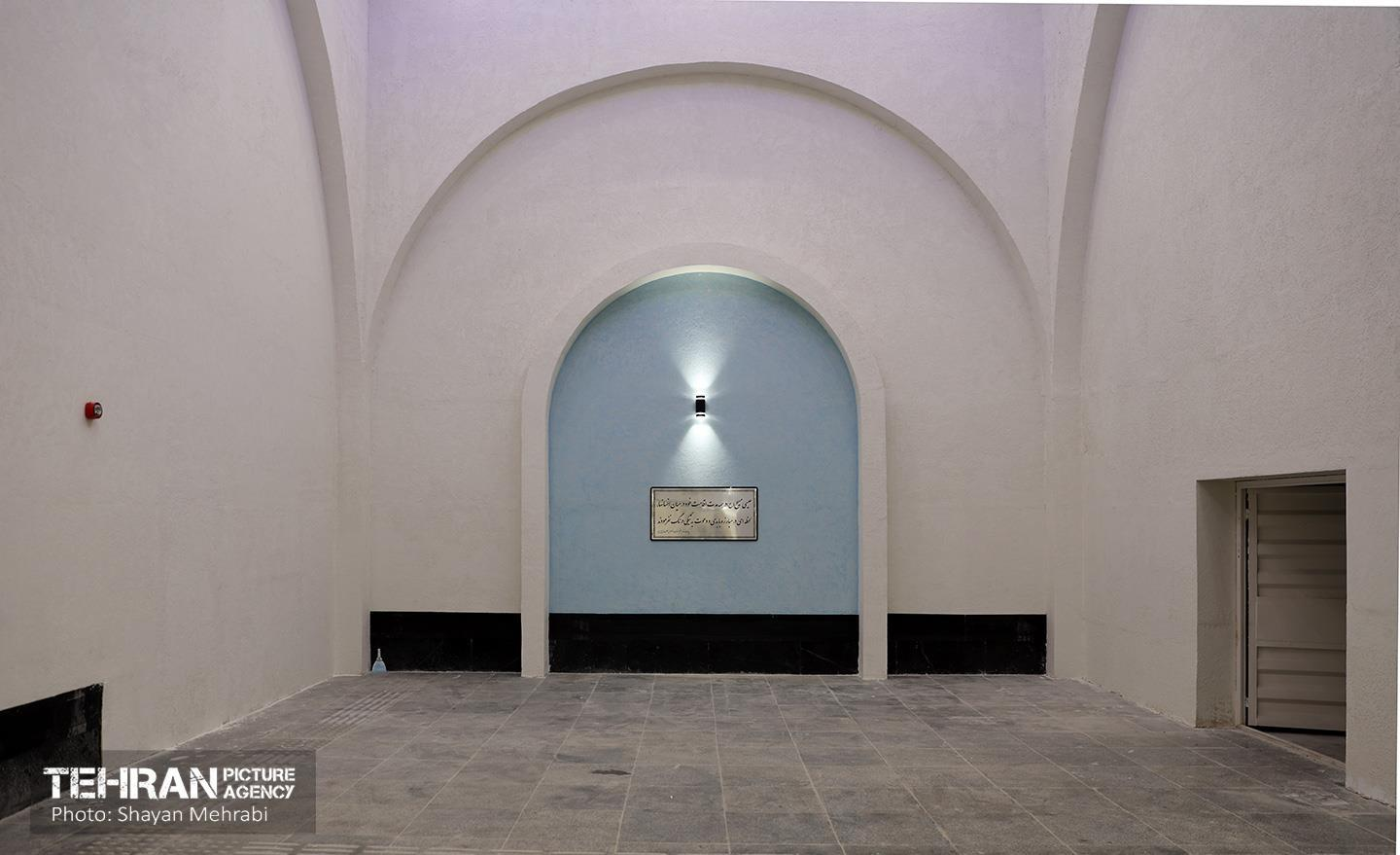

== See also ==
- Imam Khomeini station
- Baharestan Metro Station
- Christianity in Iran
