= Nabard Metro Station =

Station of the Tehran Metro

Nabard Metro Station ایستگاه مترو نبرد

General information
- Location: Piruzi Street, Cocacolla crossroad, Districts 13-14, Tehran; Iran
- Coordinates: 35.6916°N 51.4777°E
- System: Tehran Metro Station
- Operator: Tehran Urban and Suburban Railways Organization (Metro)

History
- Opened: 1389 H-Kh (2010)

Services
Preceding station	Tehran Metro	Following station
Piroozi towards Allameh Jafari	Line 4	Nirooye Havaei towards Shahid Kolahdooz
Location

Nabard Metro Station is a station of Tehran Metro Line 4. It is located in Piruzi street at Cocacolla crossroad next to Kasa Commercial Complex.
