= Baharestan Metro Station =

Station of the Tehran Metro

Baharestan Metro Station ایستگاه مترو بهارستان
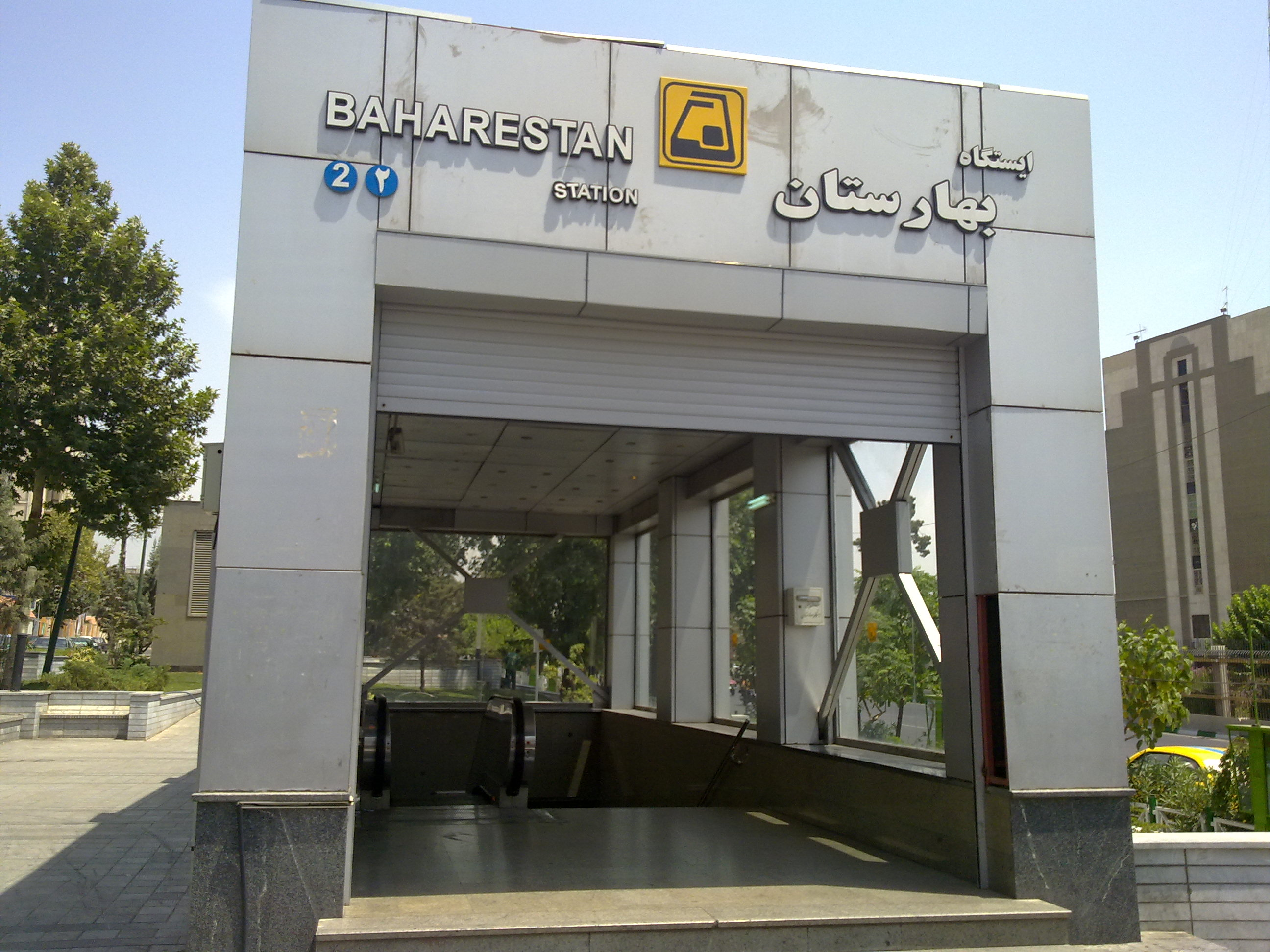

General information
- Location: Baharestan Square; District 12, Tehran, Tehran County; Tehran Province, Iran
- Coordinates: 35°41′30″N 51°25′58″E
- System: Tehran Metro Station
- Operator: Tehran Urban and Suburban Railways Organization (Metro)
- Connections: Tehran Buses: 204 Pasdar Gomnam - South Saadi; 211 Baharestan Sq.-Mo'allem St.; 276 Khorasan Sq.- Enqelab Sq.; 277 Kalantari Sq. - 7 Tir Sq.; 278 Mahallati Term. - 7 Tir Sq.; 309 Baharestan Sq.- A'emmeh At'har Sq.; 310 Barari Term.-Vali Asr Sq.; 312 Resalat Sq. - Qiam Sq.; 315; 317; 319; 345; 351; 353; 356; 407

History
- Opened: 1382 H-Kh (2003)

Services
Preceding station	Tehran Metro	Following station
Mellat towards Tehran (Sadeghiyeh)	Line 2	Darvaze Shemiran towards Farhangsara
Location

Baharestan Metro Station is a station in Tehran Metro Line 2. It is located in Baharestan Square near Majlis of Iran, and between Darvaze Shemiran Metro Station and Mellat Metro Station.
