= Dowlat Abad Metro Station =

Station of the Tehran Metro

Shohada-ye Dowlat Abad Metro Station ایستگاه مترو شهدای دولت آباد

General information
- Location: Imam Ali Expressway, Districts 15-20, Tehran; Tehran Province, Iran
- Coordinates: 35.6186°N 51.4643°E
- System: Tehran Metro Station
- Operator: Tehran Urban and Suburban Railways Organization (Metro)

History
- Opened: 18 Farvardin, 1398 H-Sh (April 7th, 2019)

Services
Preceding station	Tehran Metro	Following station
Kiyan Shahr towards Shahid Arman Aliverdi	Line 6	Terminus
Location

Shohada-ye Dowlat Abad Metro Station is the southern terminus of Tehran Metro Line 6. It is located next to Imam Ali Expressway.
