= District 10 (Tehran) =

Region of Tehran Province, Iran

District 10 Mantaqe ye Dah (منطقه ده)
- Interactive map of District 10
- Country: Iran
- Province: Tehran Province
- District 10 of Tehran Municipality: 15 July 1985

Government
  - Mayor: Hassan Ghegini

Area
  - Total: 817 ha (2,020 acres)

Population
  - Total: 327,000

Municipality of District 10 (Persian:منطقه ۱۰, also romanized as Mantaqe ye Dah) is one of 22 central districts of Tehran County in Tehran Province, Iran. The district 5 has most-populated district, which is center of city of Tehran. At the 1395 SH (2016 Gregorian calendar) census, its population was 327,000.

== History ==
District 10 of Tehran Municipality with its current structure was established on July 15, 1985.

== Geography ==
Municipality of District 10 has 3 regions and 10 quarters.

=== List of quarters ===
- Berjanak (Persian:بریانک)
- Haft Čenar (Persian:هفت چنار)
- Salsabil (Persian:سلسبیل)
- Zanjān (Persian:زنجان)

=== List of metro station ===
- Shahid Navvab-e Safavi Metro Station
- Roudaki Metro Station
- Komeyl Metro Station
- Beryanak Metro Station
