= District 14 (Tehran) =

District 14 Mantaqe ye Ĉahārdah (منطقه چهارده)
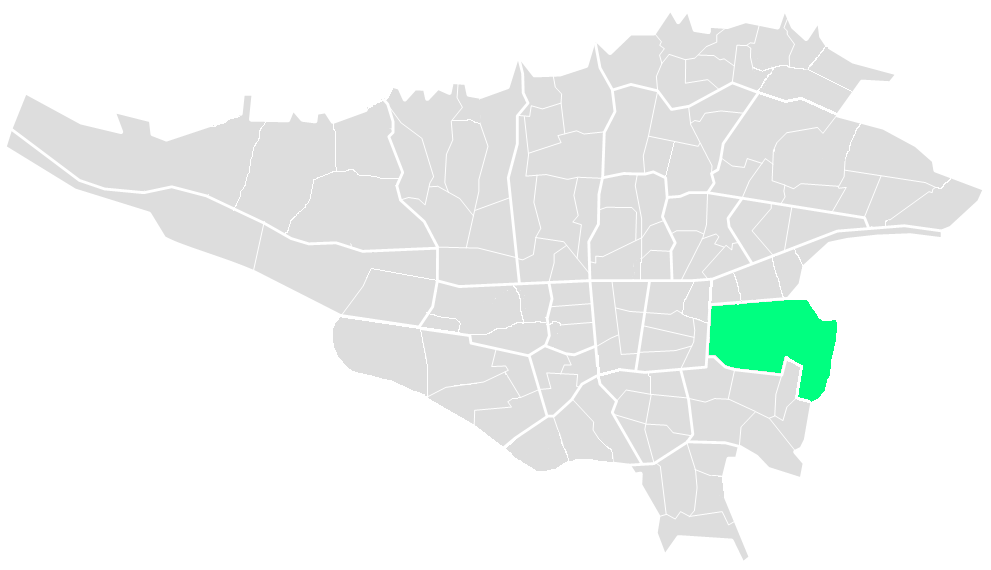
- Interactive map of District 14
- Country: Iran
- Province: Tehran Province

Government
  - Mayor: Amir Shahrabi Farahani

Area
  - Total: 9.53 ha (23.5 acres)

Population
  - Total: 482,333

District 14 (Persian:منطقه ۱۴, also romanized as Mantaqe ye Ĉahārdah) is one of 22 central districts of Tehran Municipality is located in southeast of the Tehran, Iran. At the 2010 census, its population was 482,333, in 153,649 families.

== Geography ==
List of metro stations:

- Forty tons dolab Metro Station
- hafdah shahrivar Metro Station
- amir kabir Metro Station
- Piroozi Metro Station
- Nabard Metro Station
- Kolāhdouz Metro Station
- Niroye Hāvaei Metro Station
- Ebn-Sinā Metro Station
