= Tehran Metro Line 6 =

Metro line in Tehran, Iran

Overview
- Native name: خط ۶ مترو تهران
- Owner: Tehran Urban and Suburban Railways Organization (Metro)
- Locale: Tehran, Tehran Province
- Termini: Shohada-ye Dowlat Abad; Shahid Arman Aliverdi (Kouhsar)
- Stations: 26

Service
- Type: Rapid transit
- System: Tehran Metro
- Operator(s): Tehran Urban and Suburban Railways Organization (Metro)
- Depot(s): Dowlat Abad Depot

History
- Opened: 7 April 2019

Technical
- Line length: 32 km (20 mi)
- Track gauge: 1,435 mm (4 ft 8 1/2 in)
- Electrification: 25 kV AC overhead catenary
Route map
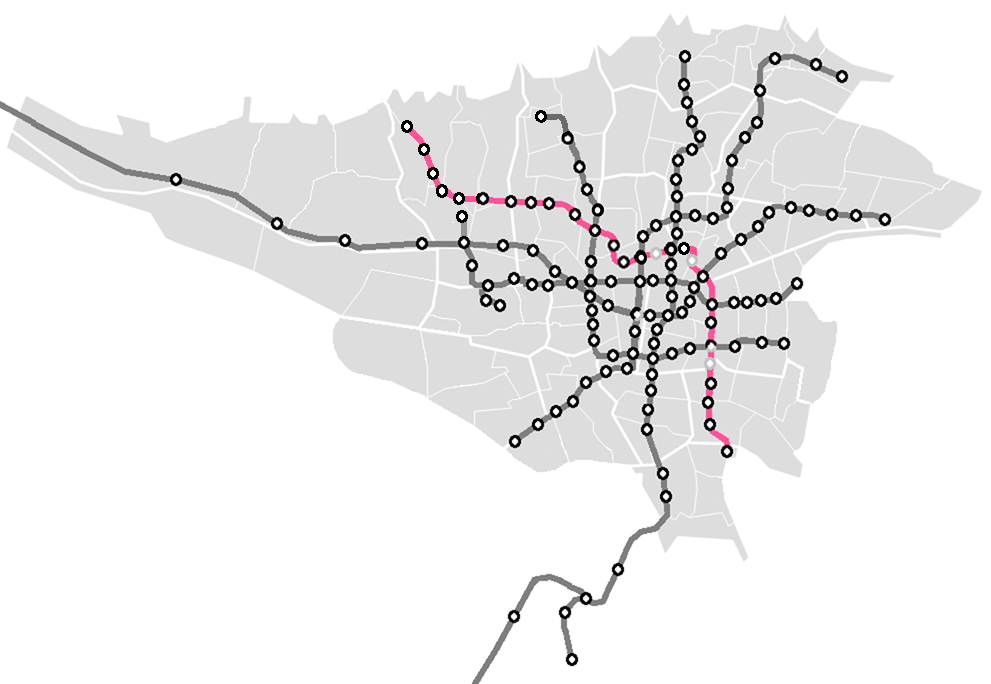

Line 6 is pink coloured on system maps. An initial 9-kilometer-long (5.6 mi) section between Shohada Square to Dowlat Abad opened on 7 April 2019. This line is 32 km (20 mi) long with 26 stations right now. When completed, it will be 42 km (26 mi) long with 32 stations, connecting southeast Tehran to northwest.

== See also ==
- Holy Mary Metro Station
