= Shahid Kolahdooz Metro Station =

Station of the Tehran Metro

Shahid Kolahdooz Metro Station ایستگاه مترو شهید کلاهدوز
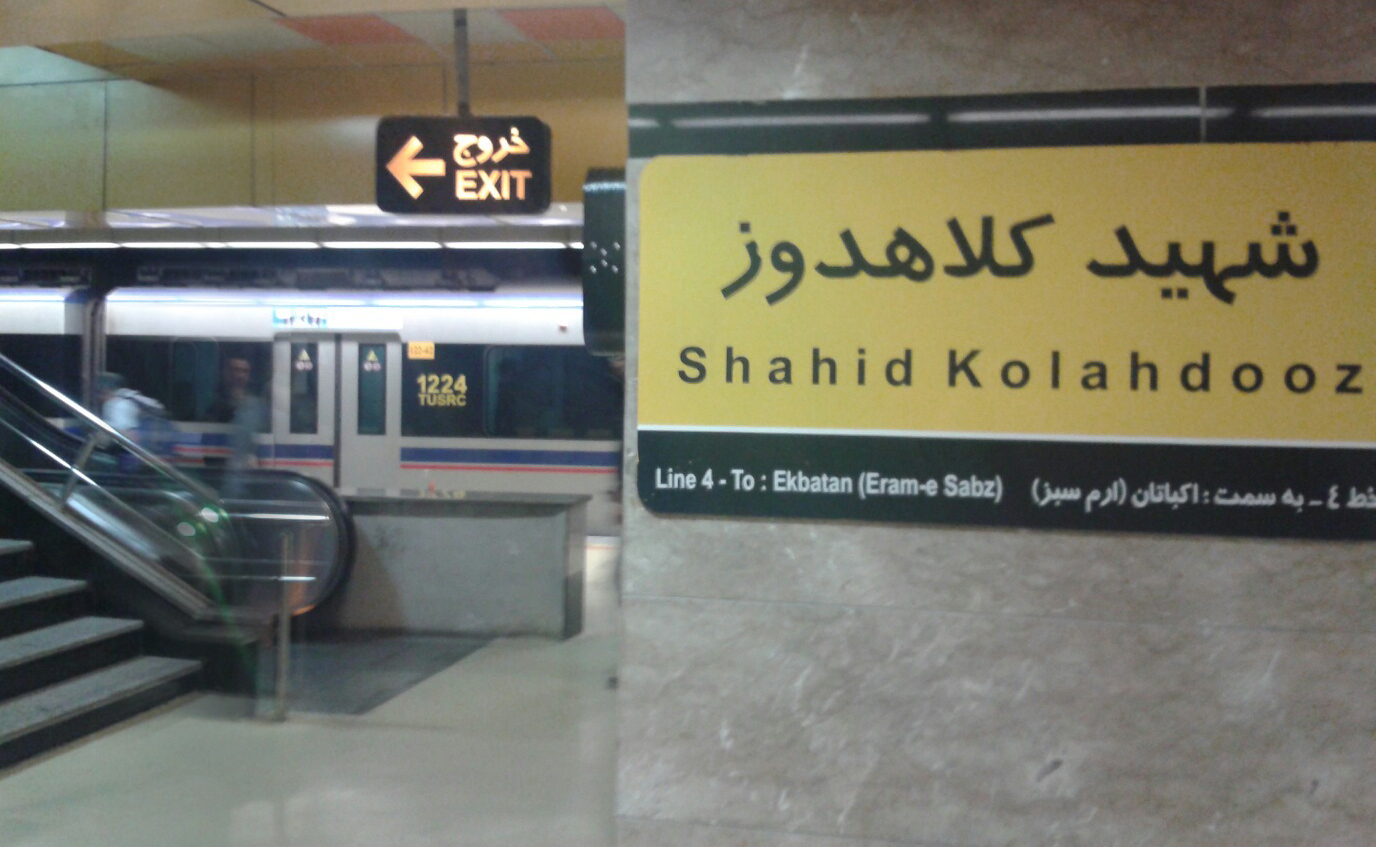

General information
- Location: Basij Expressway, District 13, Tehran; Tehran Province, Iran
- Coordinates: 35°41′56″N 51°29′55″E
- System: Tehran Metro Station
- Operator: Tehran Urban and Suburban Railways Organization (Metro)

History
- Opened: 1389 H-Kh (2010)

Services
Preceding station	Tehran Metro	Following station
Nirooye Havaei towards Allameh Jafari	Line 4	Terminus
Location

Shahid Kolahdooz (Tehran Noo) Metro Station is the eastern end of Tehran Metro Line 4. It is located in Basij Expressway.
