= District 2 (Tehran) =

District 2 of Tehran Municipality Mantaqe ye Dow (منطقه دو)
- Interactive map of District 2 of Tehran Municipality
- Country: Iran
- Province: Tehran Province

Government
  - Mayor: Mahdi Salehi

Area
  - Total: 47.1 km^{2} (18.2 sq mi)

Population
  - Total: 701,303
- Website: http://region2.tehran.ir/Default.aspx?tabid=80

District 2 of Tehran Municipality (Persian:شهرداری منطقه ۲ تهران, also romanized as Mantaqe ye Dow), is one of 2 municipality districts of Tehran, which is located in Northeast of Azadi Sq. It stretches from West to Northwest and Azadi St. to South, to Ashrafi Esfahani Highway and Mohammad Ali Jenah Expressway to West, and Chamran Highway to East.

At 2011 census, its population was 701,303 in 239,742 families. (Note: Amar.org - Population and Housing Census.xls(File))
