= Tehran Metro Line 7 =

Metro line in Tehran, Iran

Overview
- Native name: خط ۷ مترو تهران
- Owner: Tehran Urban and Suburban Railways Organization (Metro)
- Locale: Tehran, Tehran Province
- Termini: Varzeshgah-e Takhti; Meydan-e Ketab
- Stations: 22

Service
- Type: Rapid transit
- System: Tehran Metro
- Operator(s): Tehran Urban and Suburban Railways Organization (Metro)
- Depot: Takhti Depot

History
- Opened: 10 June 2017; 9 years ago
- Last extension: 19 August 2019

Technical
- Line length: 28 km (17 mi)
- Track gauge: 1,435 mm (4 ft 8 1/2 in)
- Electrification: 25 kV AC overhead catenary
Route map
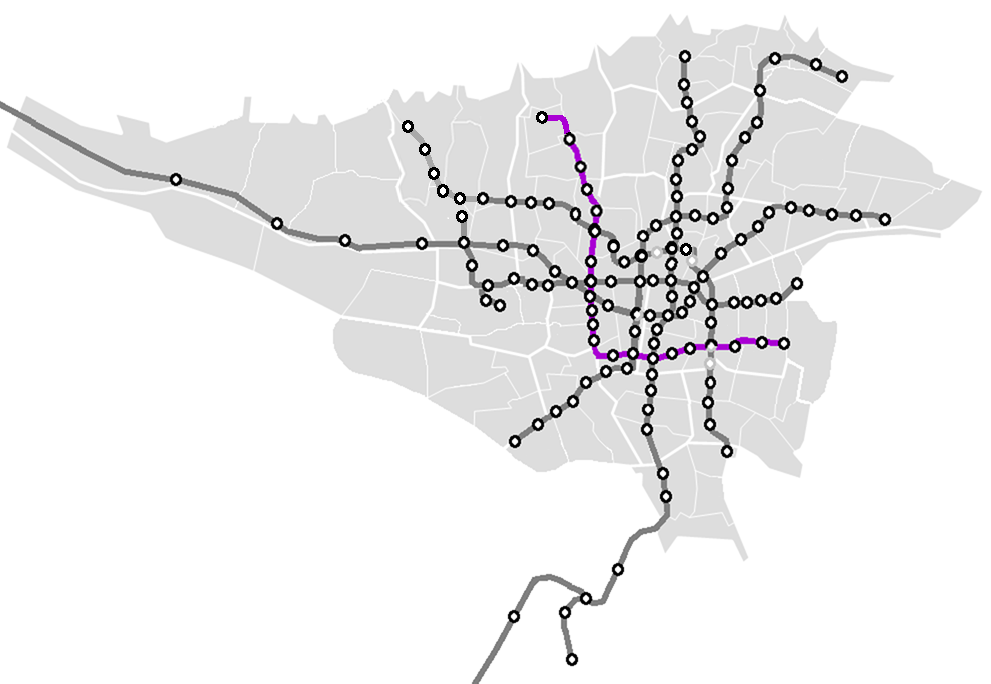

Line 7, similar to Line 6, and in contrast with Line 3, goes from northwest to southeast and was constructed with modern TBM machines. Its first phase, consisting of 18 km (11 mi) of line and 7 stations, was opened in June 2017. This line has 28 km (17 mi) with 22 stations right now.
