= Shahid Hemmat Metro Station =

Station of the Tehran Metro

Shahid Hemmat ایستگاه مترو شهید همت
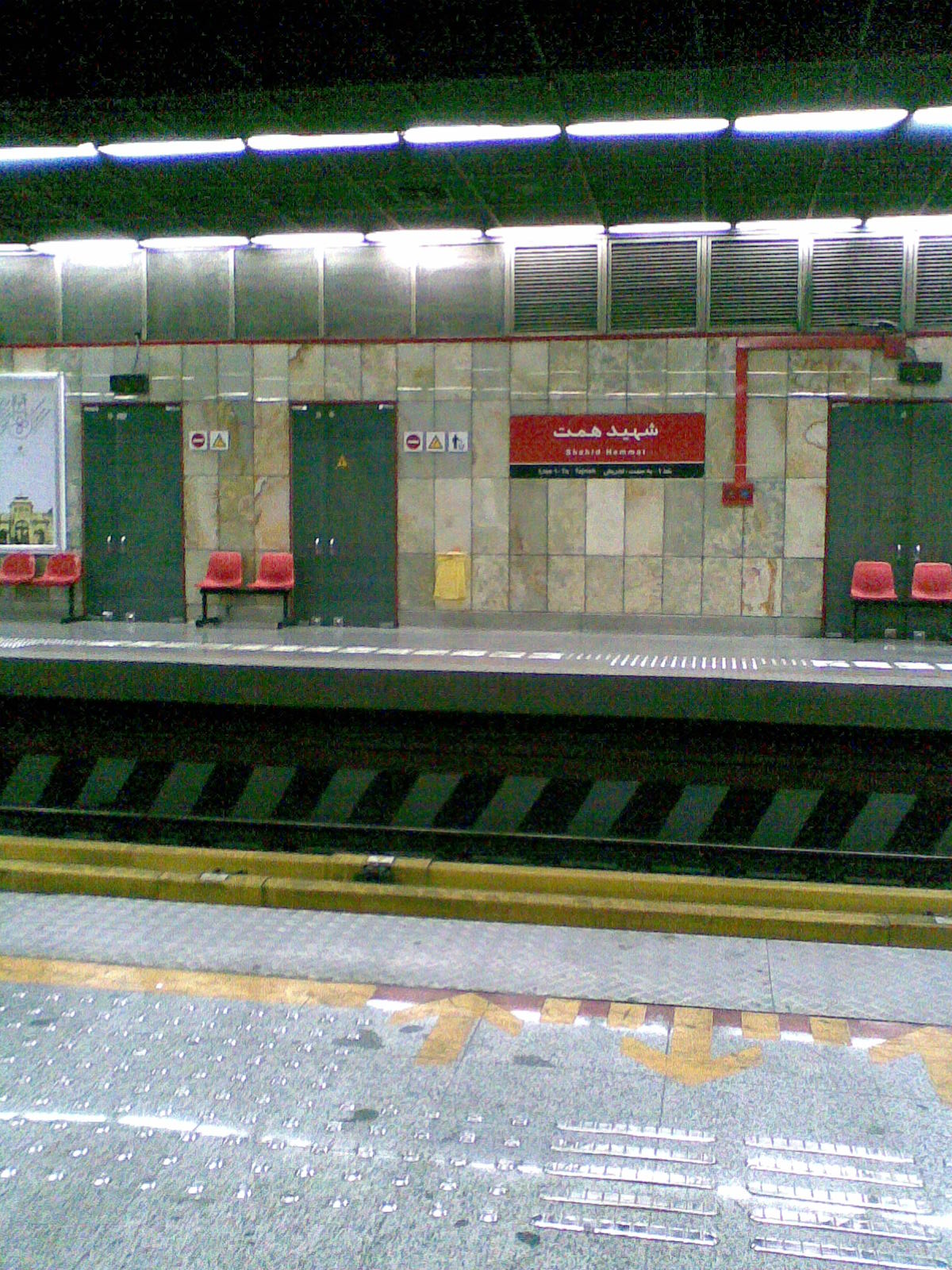

General information
- Location: Hemmat Expressway; District 3, Tehran, Tehran County; Iran
- Coordinates: 35°44′51″N 51°25′41″E
- System: Tehran Metro Station
- Operator: Tehran Urban and Suburban Railways Organization (Metro)
- Connections: Tehran Buses: 326 Chitgar Metro-Hemmat-Shari'ati

History
- Opened: 1380 H-Kh (2001)

Services
Preceding station	Tehran Metro	Following station
Shahid Haghani towards Tajrish	Line 1	Mosalla towards Kahrizak
Location

Hemmat Metro Station is a station in Tehran Metro Line 1. It is located next to Hemmat Expressway Between the junctions with Modares Expressway and Shahid Haghani Expressway. It is between Mosalla Metro Station and Shahid Haghani Metro Station. The station is named after Mohammad Ebrahim Hemmat.

== Facilities ==
The station has a ticket office, escalators, cash machines, bus connections, pay phones, water fountains, and a lost and found.
