= Pahlavi Park =

Park in Tehran, Iran

Coordinates: 35°42′02″N 51°24′23″E

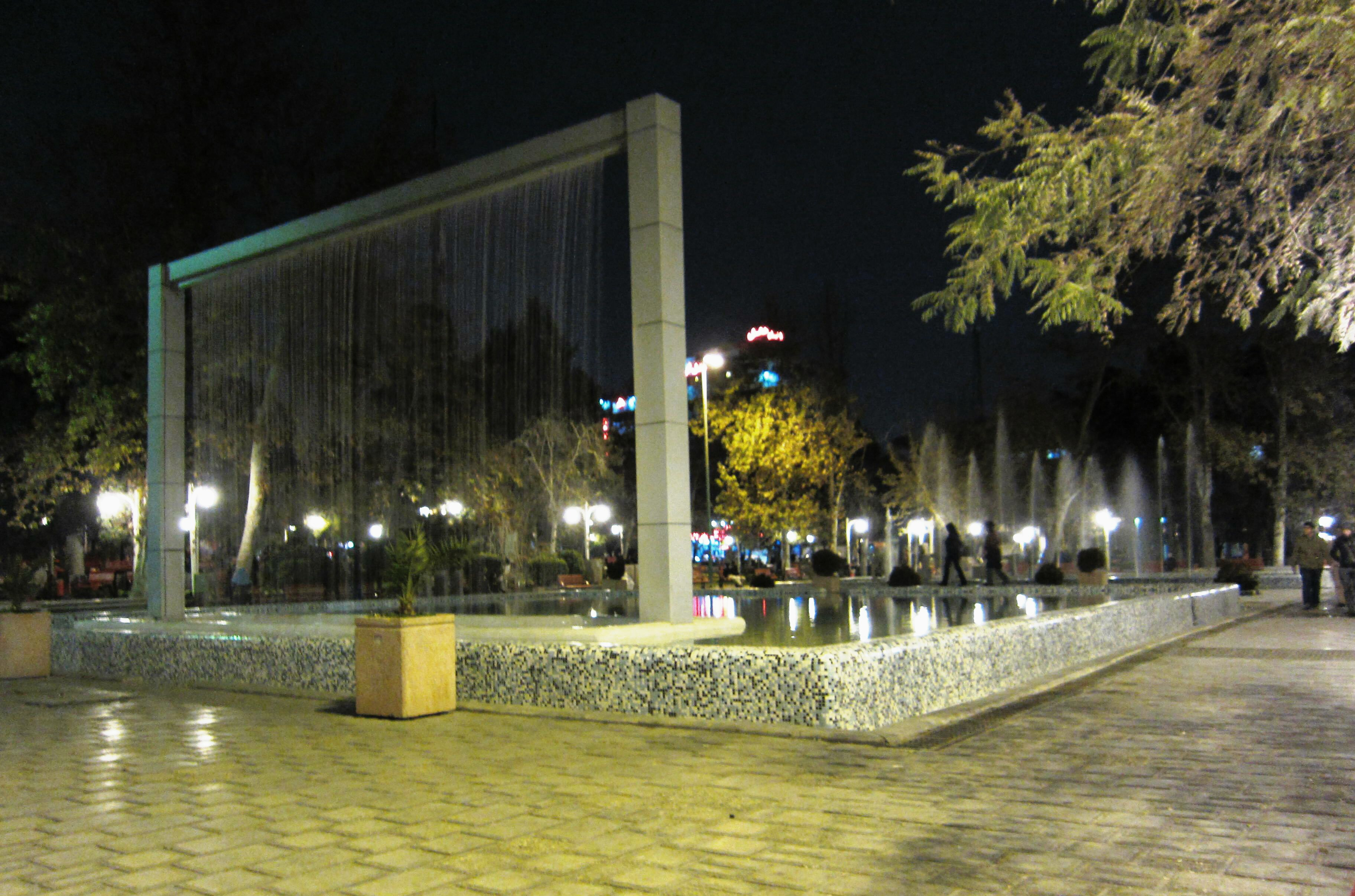
- Interactive map of Pahlavi Park
- Type: Urban park
- Location: Enghelab Street, Valiasr Intersection, Tehran, Iran
- Area: Enghelab Street, Tehran, Iran

Pahlavi Park (Persian: بوستان پهلوی), formerly called Daneshjoo park (Persian: بوستان دانشجو), is an urban park in Enqelab Street, Tehran. It is located between Vali Asr intersection and in neighboring of the City Theater of Tehran. It is bounded by Valiasr Street from the west, Razi Street from the east and Enqelab Street from the north.

It is located in the ground of approximately 3200 square meters, and consists of Tehran City Theatre hall, Daneshjoo library, play grounds, buffet and rest rooms. In recent years, Tehran municipality has built Teatr-e Shahr Metro Station in the northwest corner and Vali Asr cultural complex in the southwest corner of the park.
