= Mirdamad =

Mīrdāmād (Persian: میرداماد) or Mīr Dāmād may refer to the following:

- Mir Damad, an Iranian scholar in the early 17th century
- Mirdamad Boulevard, a boulevard in Tehran, named after Mir Damad
