= Valiasr Street =

Street in Tehran, Iran

Coordinates: 35.732826°N 51.411112°E

Valiasr Street; خیابان ولیعصر
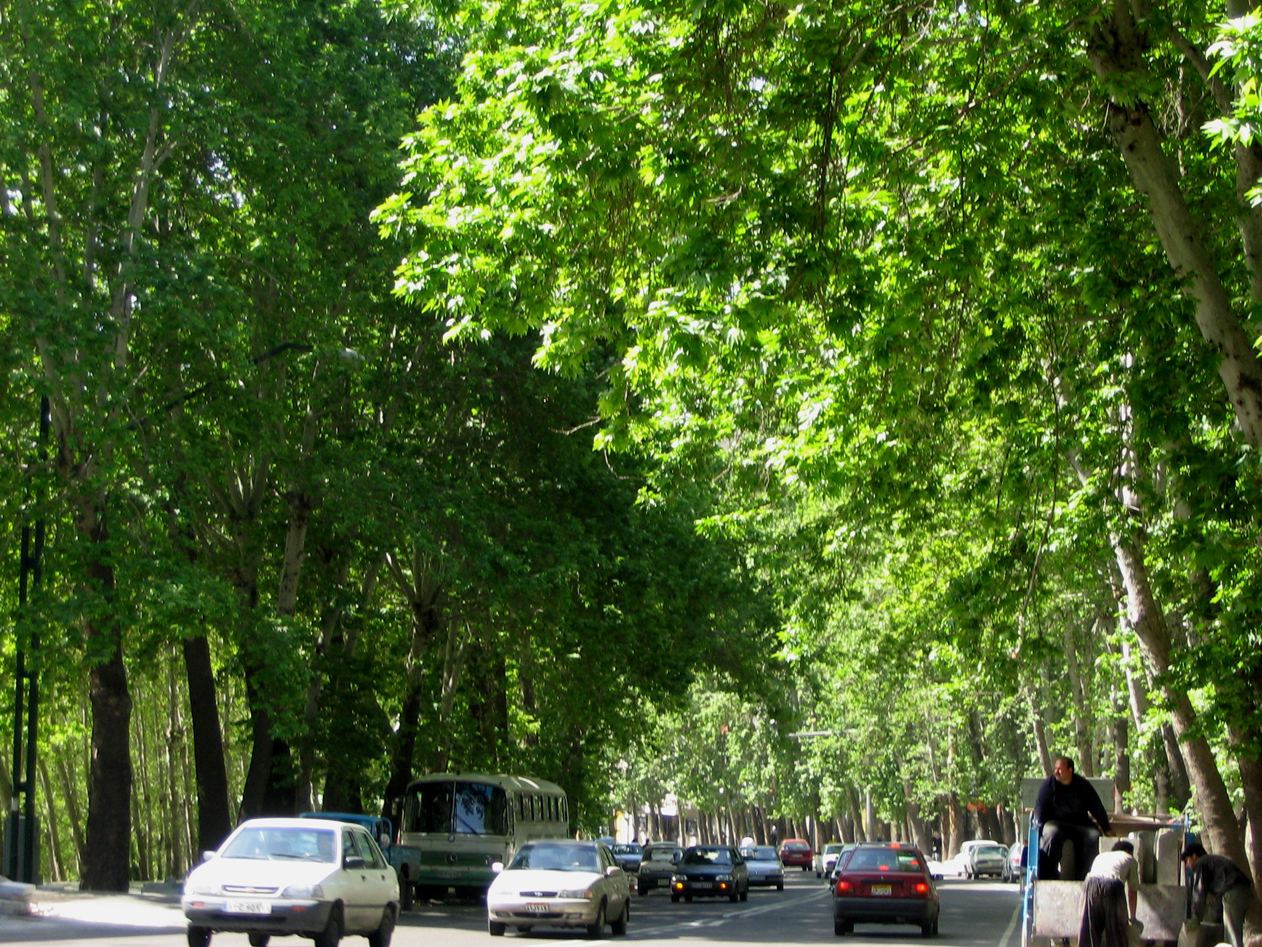
- Length: 17.9 km (11.1 mi)
- Location: Tehran
- From: Tajrish Square
- To: Rahahan Square

Valiasr Street (Persian: خیابان ولیعصر), commonly known by its former name Pahlavi Street (Persian: خیابان پهلوی) is a tree-lined street in Tehran, dividing the metropolis into western and eastern parts which were built in 1922 to 1927 respectively, considering the end of asphalt plan it ended in 1933. It is considered one of Tehran's main thoroughfares and commercial centers. It is also the longest street in the Middle East, and was reported as one of the longest in the world by former BBC (now Al Jazeera) journalist Rageh Omaar during the television documentary Welcome to Tehran.

The street was built by Reza Shah's order and called the Pahlavi Street. After the Iranian Revolution the street's name was changed initially to Mosaddegh Street, in reference to the former prime minister of Iran, Mohammad Mosaddegh, and later to Valiasr Street, after the twelfth Shi'ite Imam, Muhammad al-Mahdi. This vibrant, hub-like street is lined with many shops, restaurants, parks, and cultural centers situated along this long avenue.

== History ==
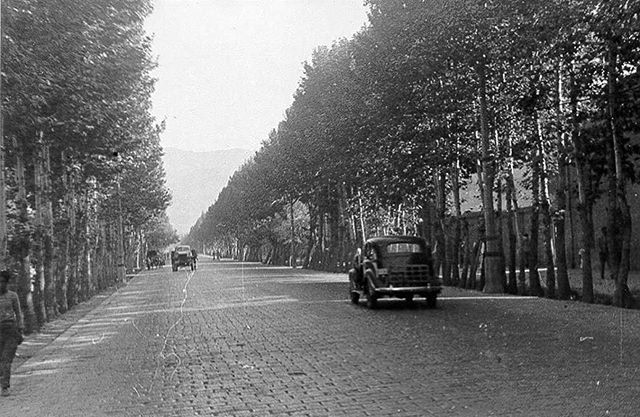
Pahlavi (Valiasr) street before being asphalted in the 1930s

The construction of Valiasr Street dates back to the era of Minister Reza Shah during the Qajar era. Almost a hundred years ago, He began buying land, such as parts of Behjat Abad in Shemiran (a district in central Tehran). Later, he bought the palace belonging to the daughter of Naser al-Din Shah Qajar. At the same time, Reza Pahlavi had begun constructing a street in Shemiranat County in Tehran province to make access to the palaces in that area more efficient.

During the Qajar era, palaces were built on the North and South of the Capital by the Qajar shahs like Ahmad Shah Qajar. Because of the location of the Marble Palace (Marmar Palace) in Tehran, Reza Shah decided to extend the route leading to the palaces in the Northern part of Tehran heading to the Marble Palace. When he sat on the throne, Reza named this route “Pahlavi.”

Therefore, before the 1979 Iranian Revolution, Vali-e Asr Street was called Pahlavi Street after the Pahlavi dynasty. Previously, the route was a minor dirt road for local crossings.

From then on, the renowned Valiasr Street started its formation, and in the initial stages of the construction, planting Plane trees and building a stream also began on this route. Seven years later, Tehran municipality paved this street. In 1930, asphalting was introduced in Tehran's urban development system, and a year later, Valiasr Street was asphalted.

In 1938, a rose bush was planted on both sides of Valiasr Street, two meters apart, and between two saplings, and two wells were dug in Zafaraniyeh, which is now an upmarket neighborhood in Tehran, for irrigating these newly planted trees.

As mentioned earlier, the street was only for the use of government officials. However, from 1940 onwards, access to Pahlavi Street was made possible for ordinary people. With the presence of some neighboring allies in Iran and their entry into the Pahlavi Street, the route was then made permissible for the general public, and people were able to walk around the Behjat Abad gardens.

== Environmental concerns ==
The chinar (Platanus) trees of Valiasr Street have always been a major element of the street's identity and one of Tehran's irreplaceable landmarks. After the Iranian Revolution, due to severe mismanagement, the living conditions of the trees have been constantly deteriorated, causing immense public concerns. The number of trees decreased from 24,000 in 1946 to 12,000 in 1995. In 2012 only 8,288 trees were left. The main contributing issues include, but are not limited to:

- destruction of natural waterflow networks such as rivers and springs;
- irregular watering;
- water contamination;
- soil contamination;
- damages to the roots of the trees by the increased population of the rats, poor curbing, pouring concrete foundation for construction projects;
- soil erosion and exposure of the tree roots to the air;
- mistreatment of the trees by humans;
- air pollution;
- lack of sunlight exposure due to high-rise building.

In only one of several incidents, in July 2022, a property owner intentionally poisoned 13 trees just for a better visibility of the building's façade.

It was reported in 2023 that 179 trees on the street would be cut down and replaced. The concern for the trees of Valiasr Street is reflected in the Grammy Award winning song Baraye.

== Shopping ==
Valiasr Avenue is the main Shopping street in Tehran and the whole of Iran. Many foreign chain stores have branches on this street, including Benetton Group (with three stores), Reebok, and Adidas. Many important shopping centers of Tehran are located on Valiasr street, like the Tandis Center (located at the northeast point of the street at Tajrish Sq.), the Safavieh Mall, the Eskan Shopping center, and many more. Many luxury jewelry and accessories stores, such as Rolex and Tag Heuer, are located on this street. Furthermore, hundreds of other local stores are located on Valiasr.

== Other ==
- Many cinemas, restaurants, and hotels are located on this street.
- Tehran City Theatre
- Mellat Park and Saéi Park (two of Tehran's most visited parks)
- Jomhori Intersection Grand Bazzar
- Cinema museum
- Central building of the Iranian Red Crescent Organization
- Valiasr hospital
- Shahid rajaie Research-Therapeutic-Medical Center

== Location ==
Valiasr runs from Tehran's railway station (1,117 metres (3,665 ft) elevation above sea level) in the south of the city to the Tajrish square (1,612 metres (5,289 ft) elevation above sea level) in the north.

Valiasr runs for 12 miles (19.3 kilometers), north to south, and is filled with traffic at all hours, even until the early hours of the morning. The shops stay open late and the kiosks sell fresh fruit juice, coffee and newspapers.

From North to South
Tajrish Square	Shahrdari Street; Fana Khosro Street
	Pasyan Street
Parkway Junction	Chamran Expressway; Modares Expressway
	IRIB Road
Esfandyar Junction	Niayesh Expressway; Esfandyar Street
	Mirdamad Boulevard
Vanak Square	Haghani Expressway; Vanak Street; Mollasadra Street; Berezil Street
	Hemmat Expressway
	Abbaspur Street
	Beheshti Street
	Ostad Motahari Street
	Asadabadi Street
	Fatemi Street
Meydan-e Jahad Metro Station
Valiasr Square	Karimkhan Zand Boulevard; Keshavarz Boulevard
Meydan-e Vali Asr Metro Station
Taleghani Junction	Taleghani Street
Valiasr Junction	Enqelab Street
Teatr-e Shahr Metro Station
Jomhuri Junction	Jomhuri-ye Eslami Street
	Pastor Street; Jami Street
Imam Khomeini Junction	Imam Khomeini Street
Daneshgah-e Emam Ali Metro Station
Moniriyeh Square	Moayyeri Street; Abu Said Street
Moniriyeh Metro Station
Amir Bahador Junction	Qazvin Street; Bashiri Street
	Modarres Street; Forouzesh Street
Gomrok Junction	Mowlavi Street
Mahdiyeh Metro Station
	Mokhtari Street
Rahahan Metro Station
Rahahan Square	Shush Street; Kargar Street; Tehran Railway Station
From South to North

== Gallery ==
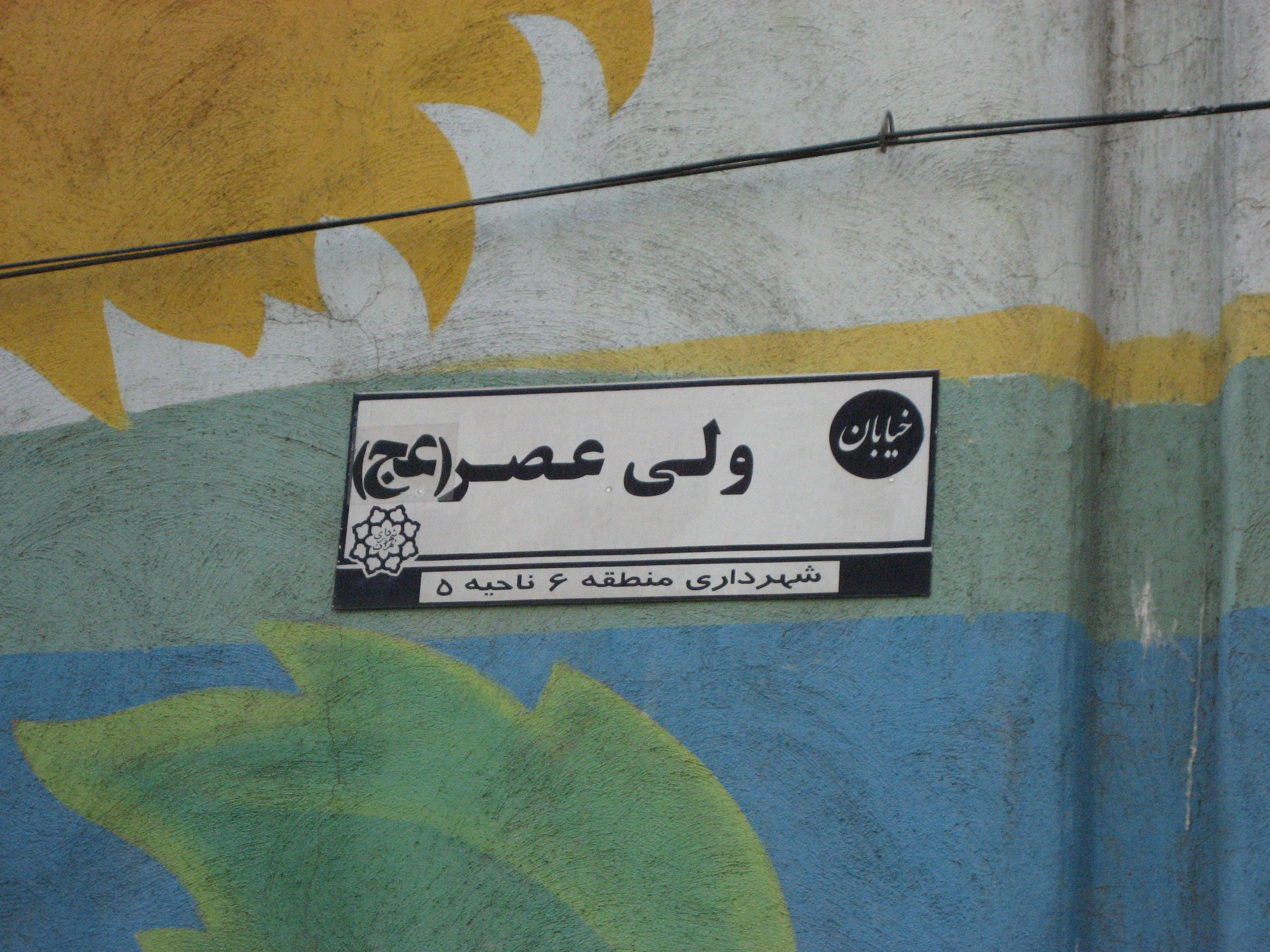
Street sign

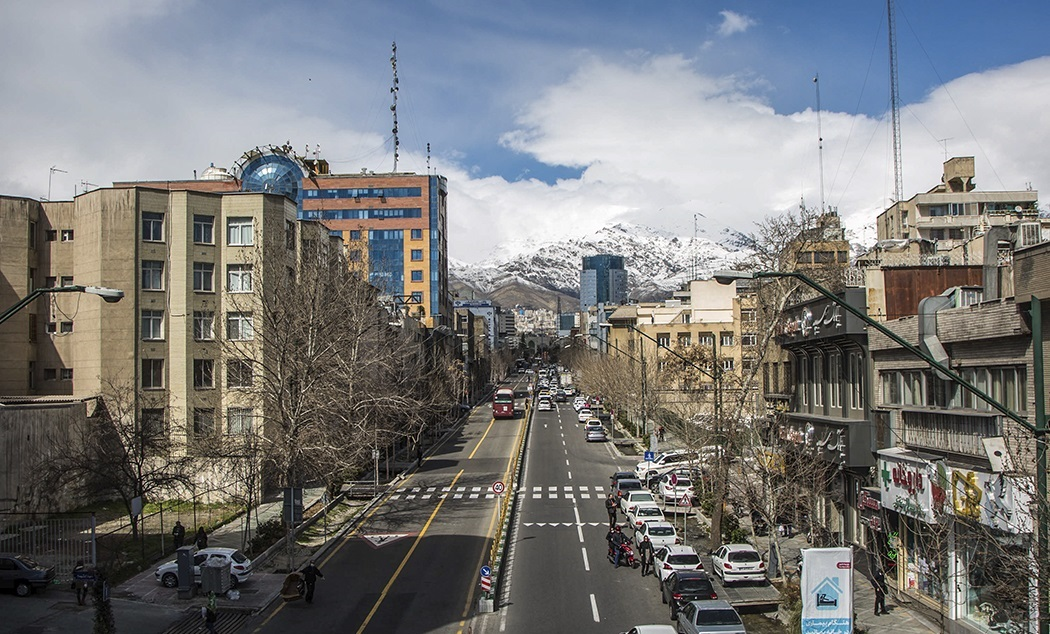
Street near Vanak

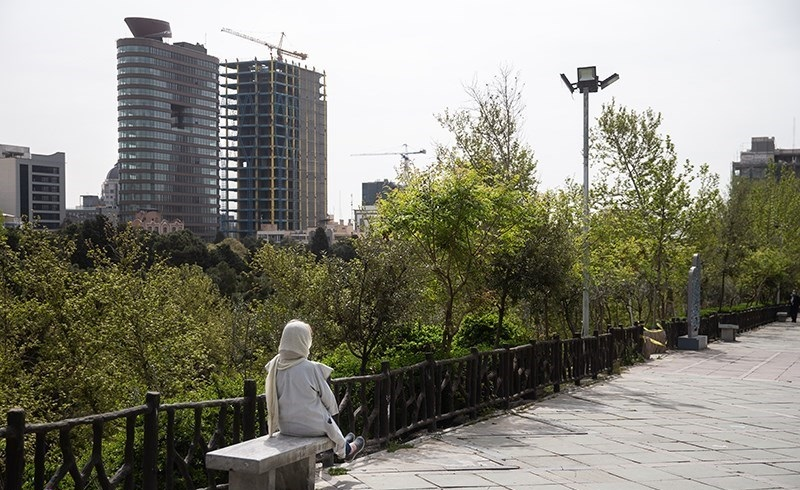
Saei Park

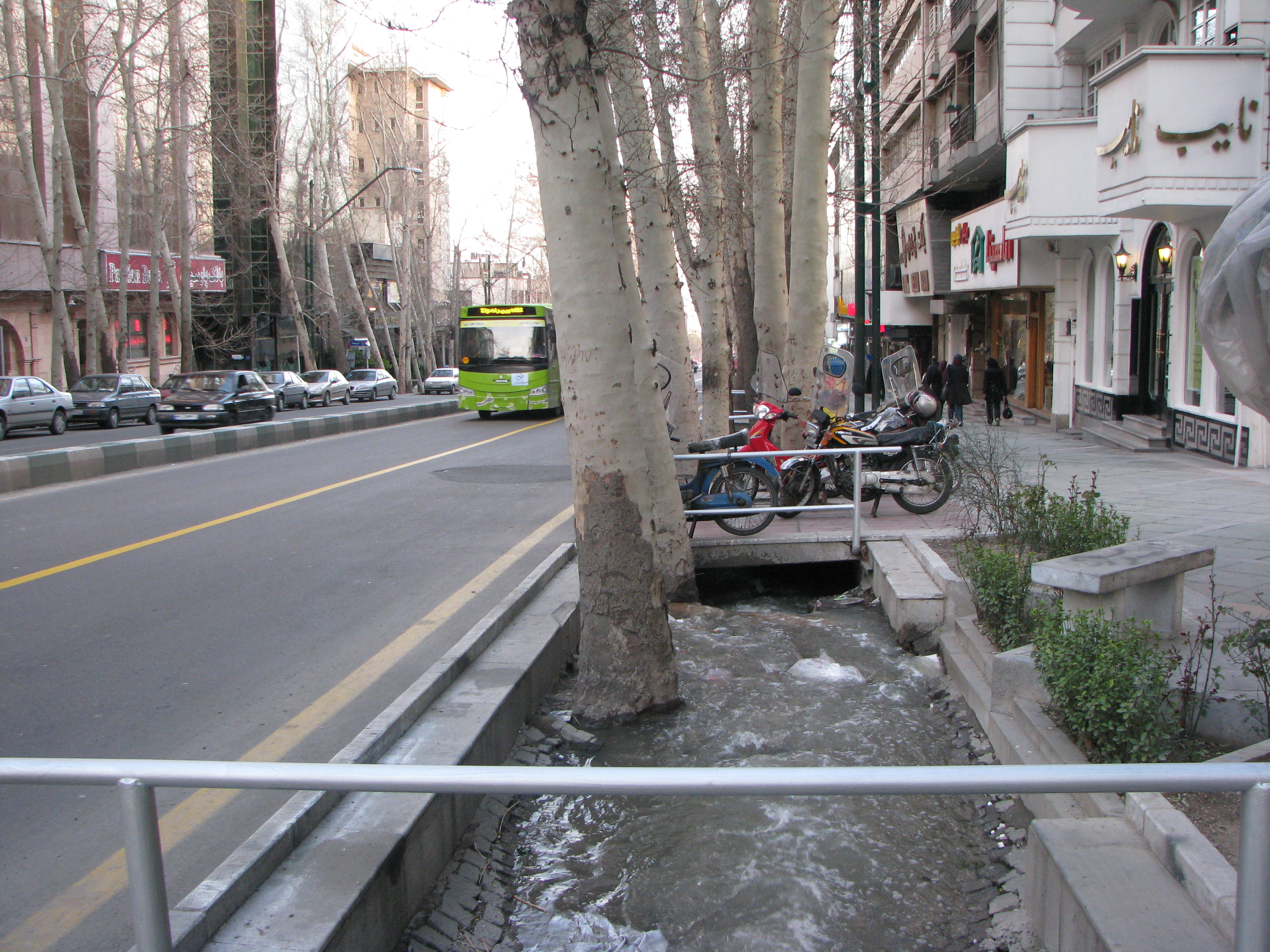
Near Saei Park

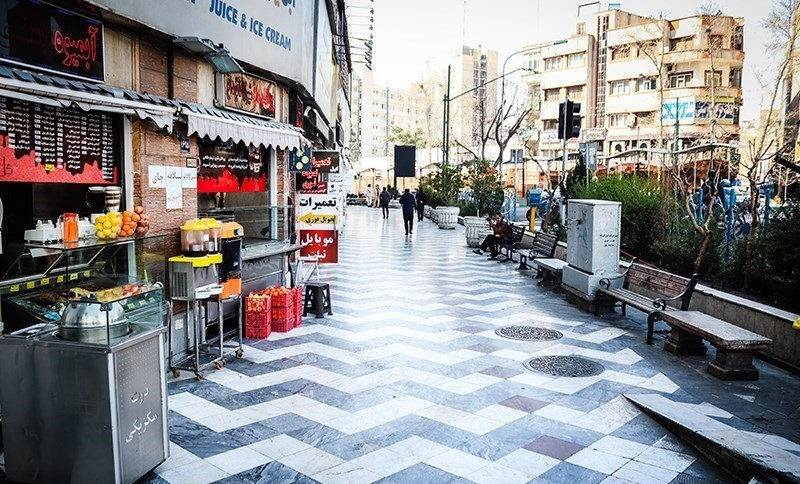
Side walk after Valiasr square

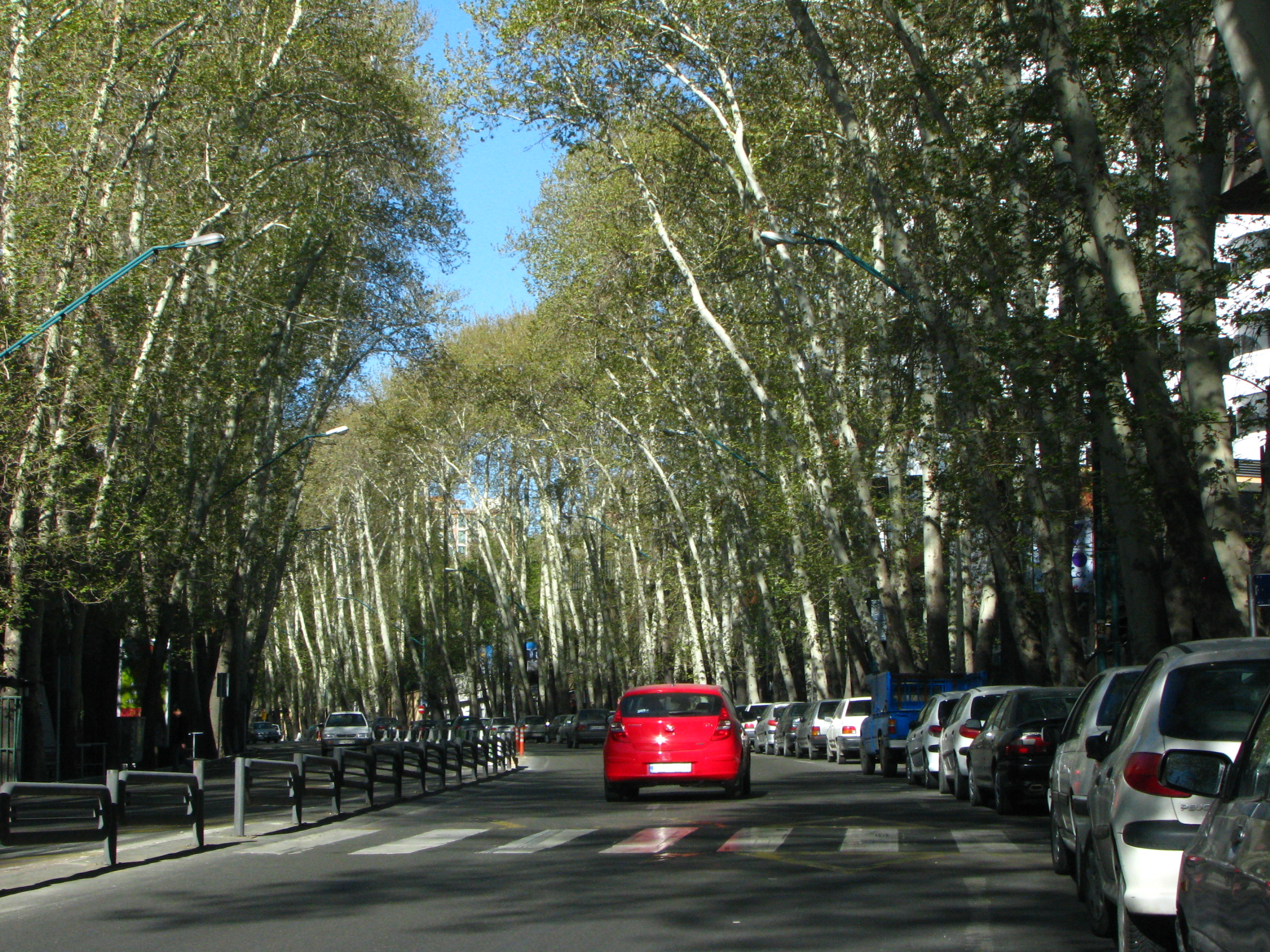
Street in spring

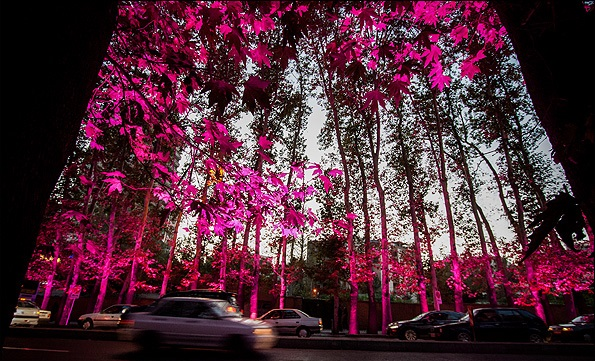
Lighting of street trees

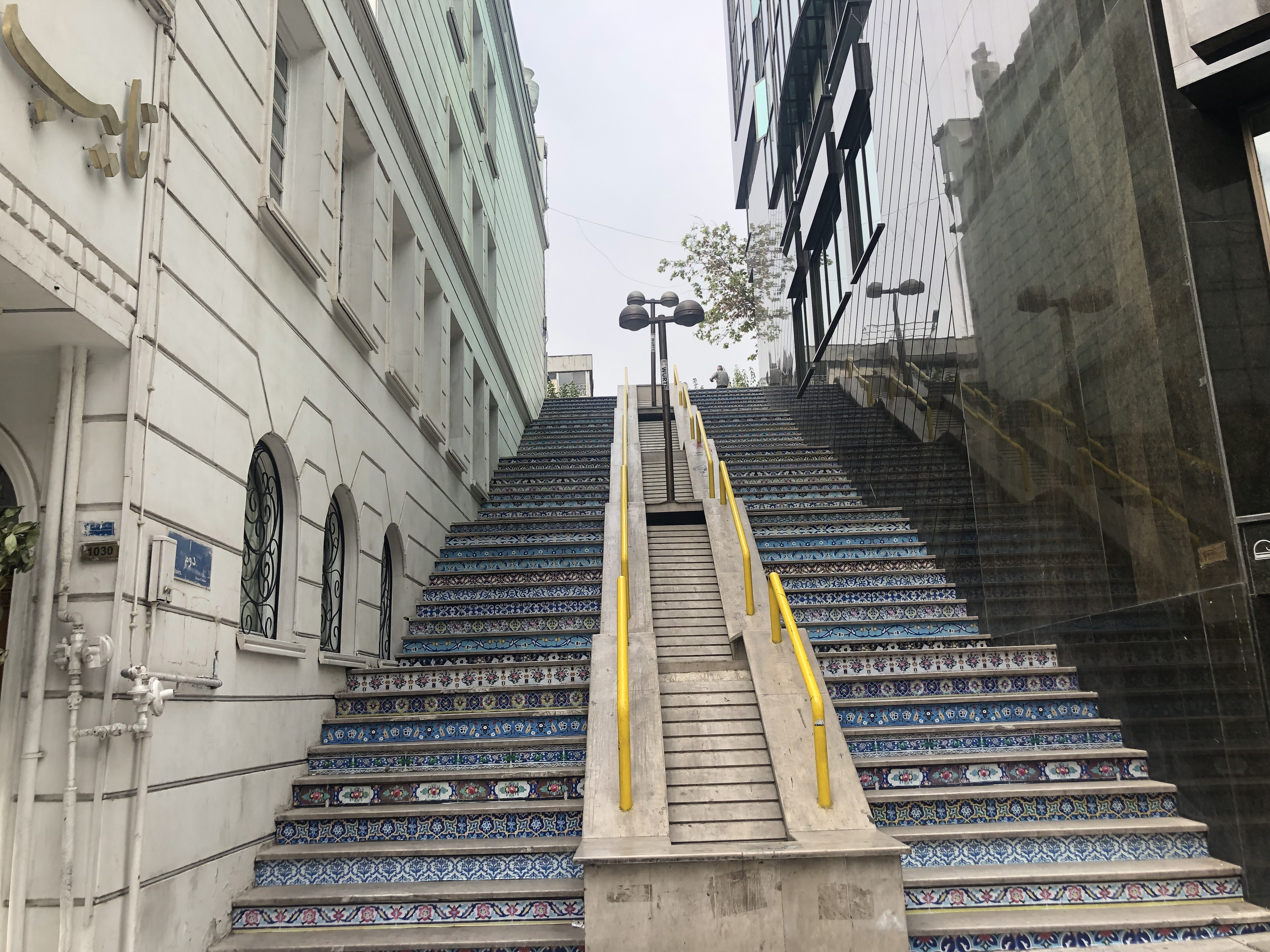
Second step

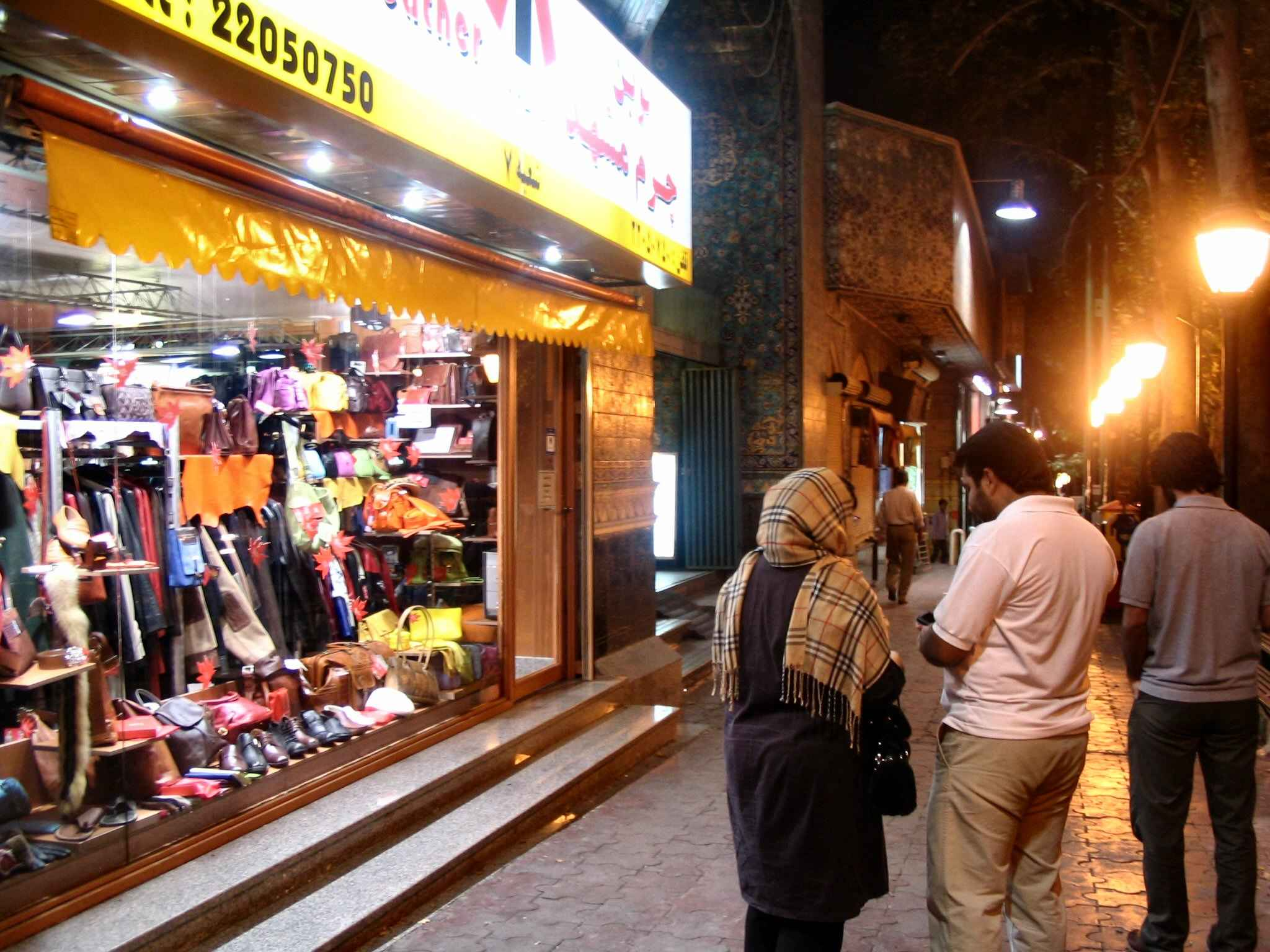
A store at the street

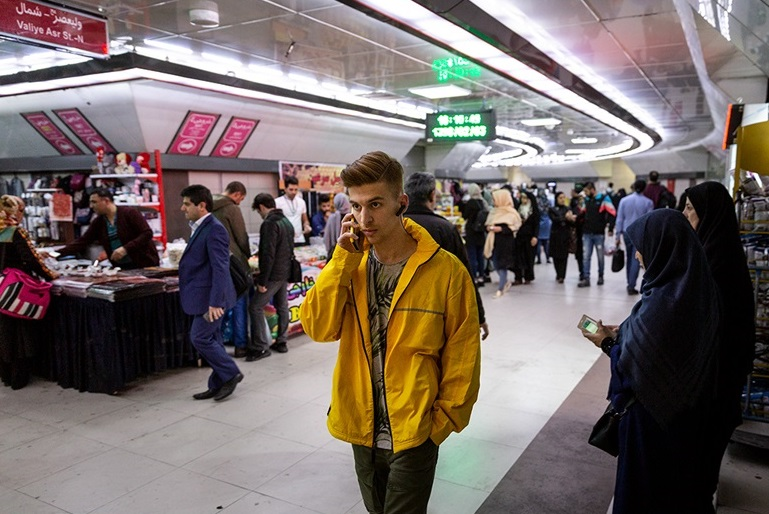
Valiasr Underpass

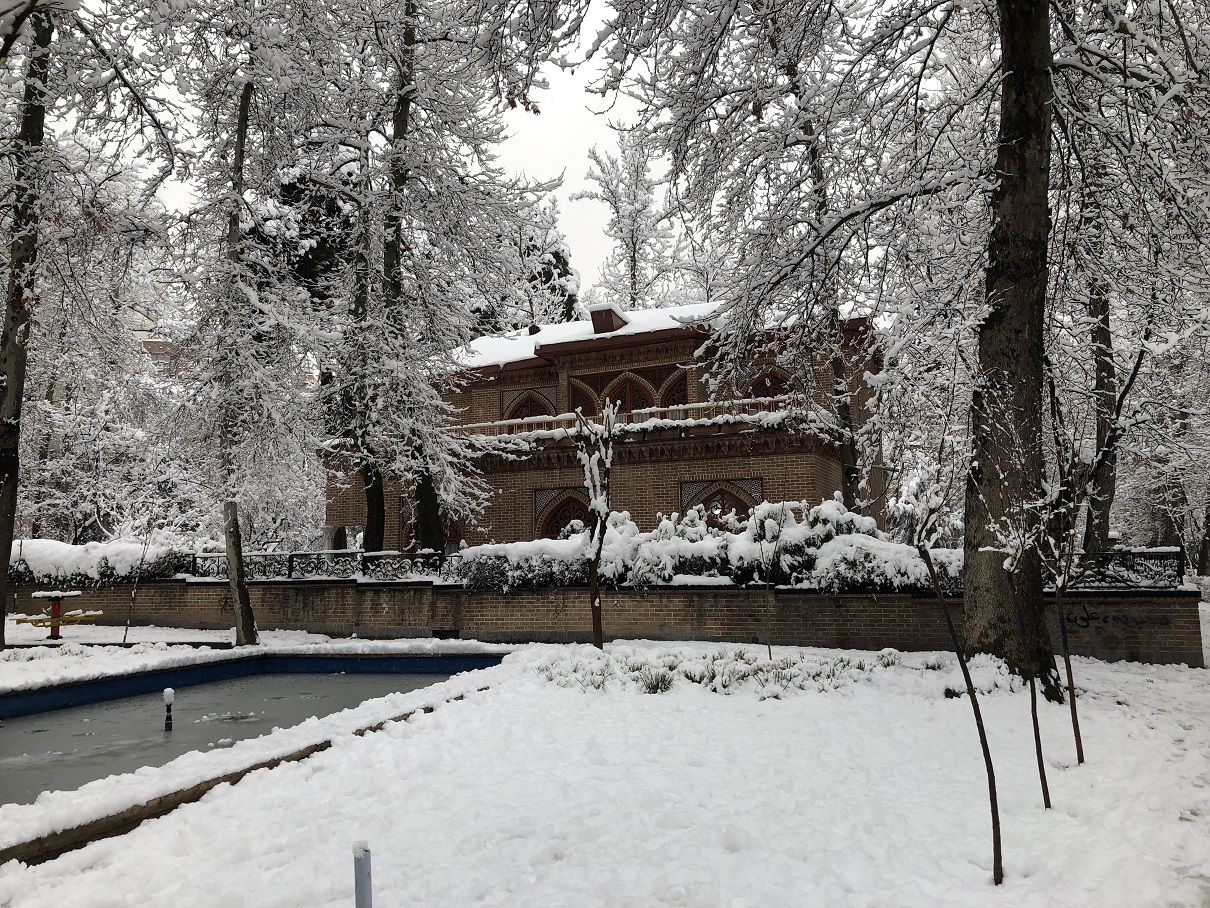
Ghalamestan Park in a snowy day

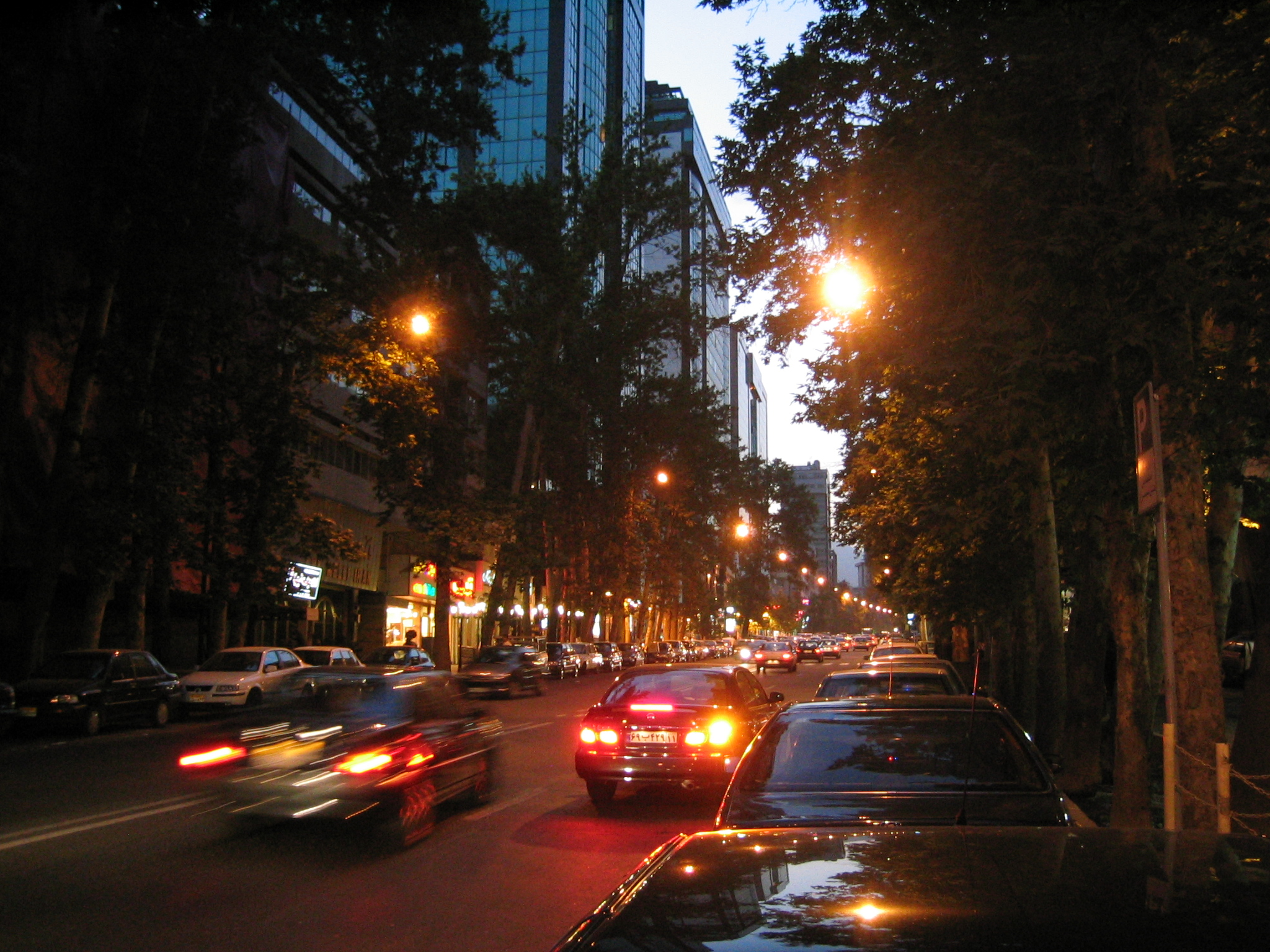
Street in the evening

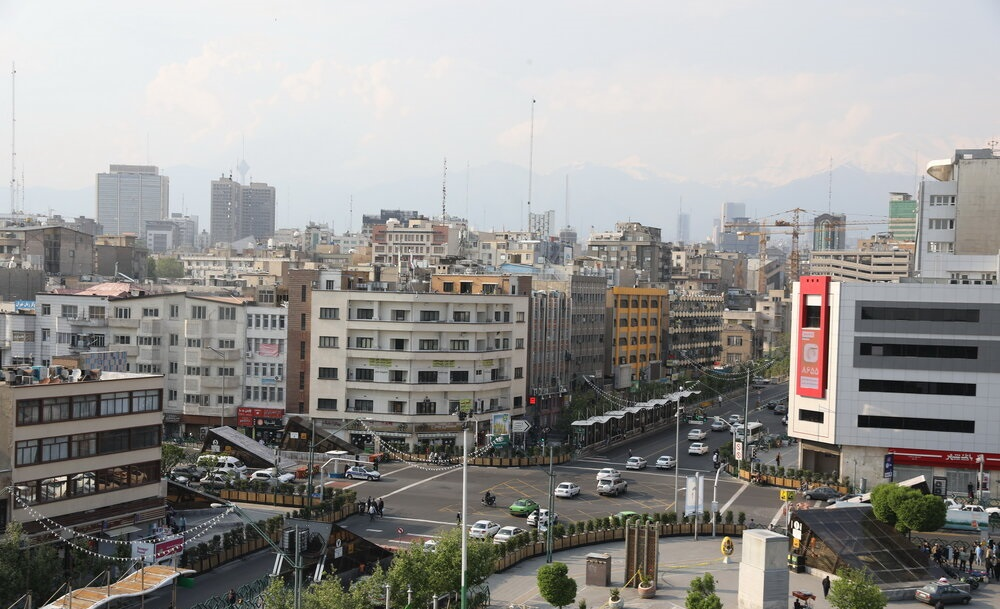
Valiasr street from City Theater of Tehran

== See also ==
- List of upscale shopping districts
