= Shahid Haghani Metro Station =

Station of the Tehran Metro

Shahid Haghani ایستگاه مترو شهید حقانی
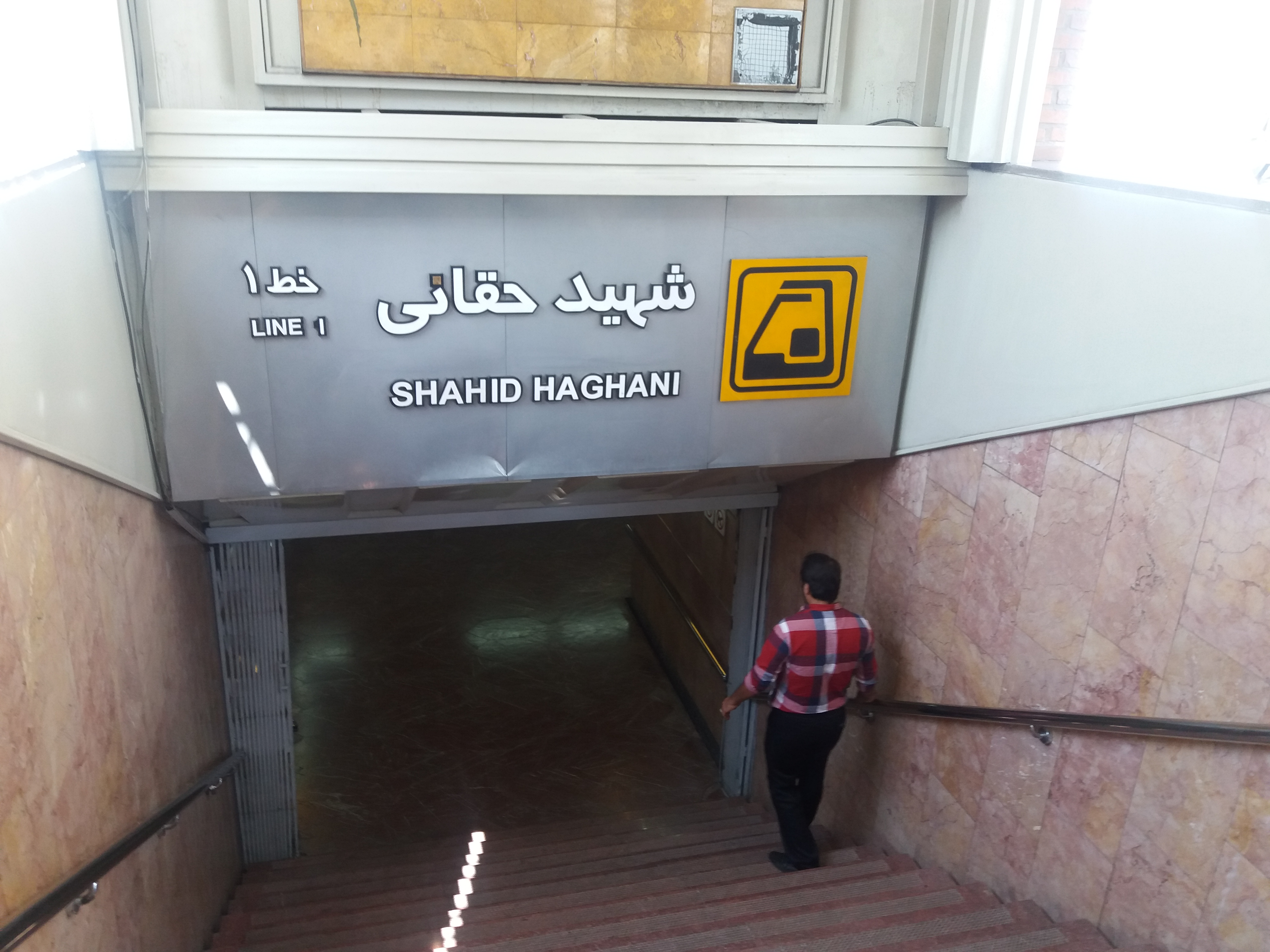

General information
- Location: Haghani Expressway; District 3, Tehran, Tehran County; Iran
- Coordinates: 35°45′21″N 51°25′34″E
- System: Tehran Metro Station
- Operator: Tehran Urban and Suburban Railways Organization (Metro)
- Connections: Tehran Buses: 234 Haghani Metro-Piruzan Sq.; 301 Haghani Metro-Artesh Blvd.; 305 Haghani Metro-San'at Sq.

History
- Opened: 1380 H-Kh (2001)

Services
Preceding station	Tehran Metro	Following station
Mirdamad towards Tajrish	Line 1	Shahid Hemmat towards Kahrizak
Location

Shahid Haghani Metro Station is a station in Tehran Metro Line 1. It is located next to Shahid Haghani Expressway Between the junctions with Hemmat Expressway and Modares Expressway. It is between Shahid Hemmat Metro Station and Mirdamad Metro Station. The station also has parking.

== Facilities ==
The station has a ticket office, escalators, elevators, cash machines, toilets, a taxi stand, bus routes, pay phones, water fountains, parking, and a lost and found.
