= Teatr-e Shahr Metro Station =

Station of the Tehran Metro

Teatr-e Shahr Metro Station ایستگاه مترو تئاتر شهر
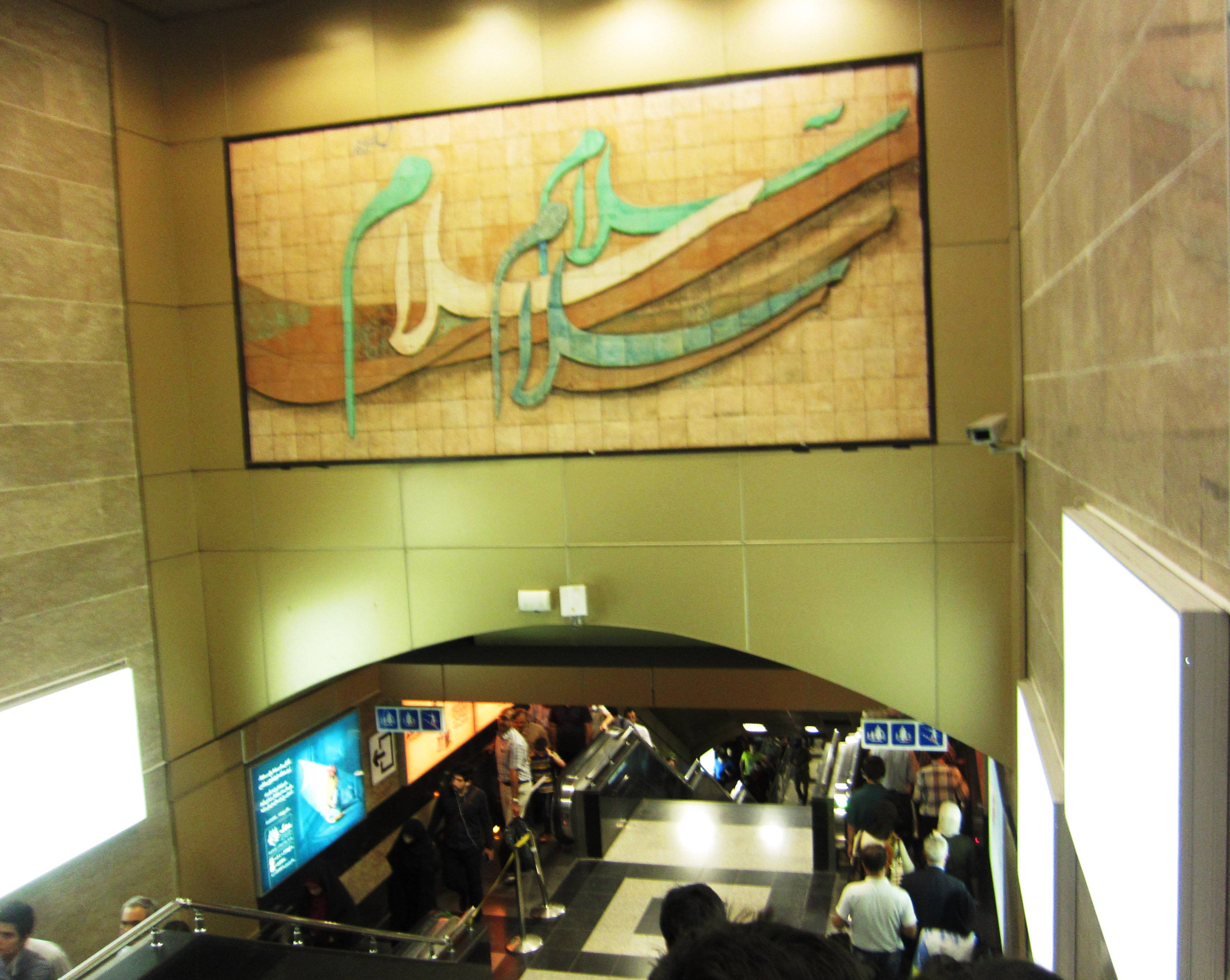
- Teatr-e Shahr Metro Station

General information
- Location: Enqelab Street- Valiasr Street, Districts 6-11, Tehran; Tehran Province, Iran
- Coordinates: 35°42′04″N 51°24′20″E
- System: Tehran Metro Station
- Operator: Tehran Urban and Suburban Railways Organization (Metro)
- Platforms: 2 Side Platforms Tehran Metro Line 3 2 Side Platforms Tehran Metro Line 4
- Tracks: 4
- Connections: Tehran BRT: BRT 1; BRT 7 · 107 Rahahan-Tajrish · 152 Rahahan-Parkway

Construction
- Structure type: Underground
- Platform levels: 2

History
- Opened: 1387 H-Kh (2008); 1391 H-Kh (2012)

Services
Preceding station	Tehran Metro	Following station
Meydan-e Vali Asr towards Ghaem	Line 3	Moniriyeh towards Azadegan
Meydan-e Enghelab-e Eslami towards Allameh Jafari	Line 4	Ferdowsi towards Shahid Kolahdooz
Location

Teatr-e Shahr Metro Station is a station in Tehran Metro Line 4 and Line 3. It is located at the intersection of Enghelab Street and Valiasr Street near the location of Teatr-e Shahr, in Daneshjoo Park. The station was formerly known as Vali Asr Metro Station. However, its name was officially changed on February 2, 2016, in order to avoid confusions with the newer Meydan-e Vali Asr Metro Station.

== See also ==
- City Theater of Tehran
- Tehran metro
