= Mirdamad Metro Station =

Station of the Tehran Metro

Mirdamad ایستگاه مترو میرداماد
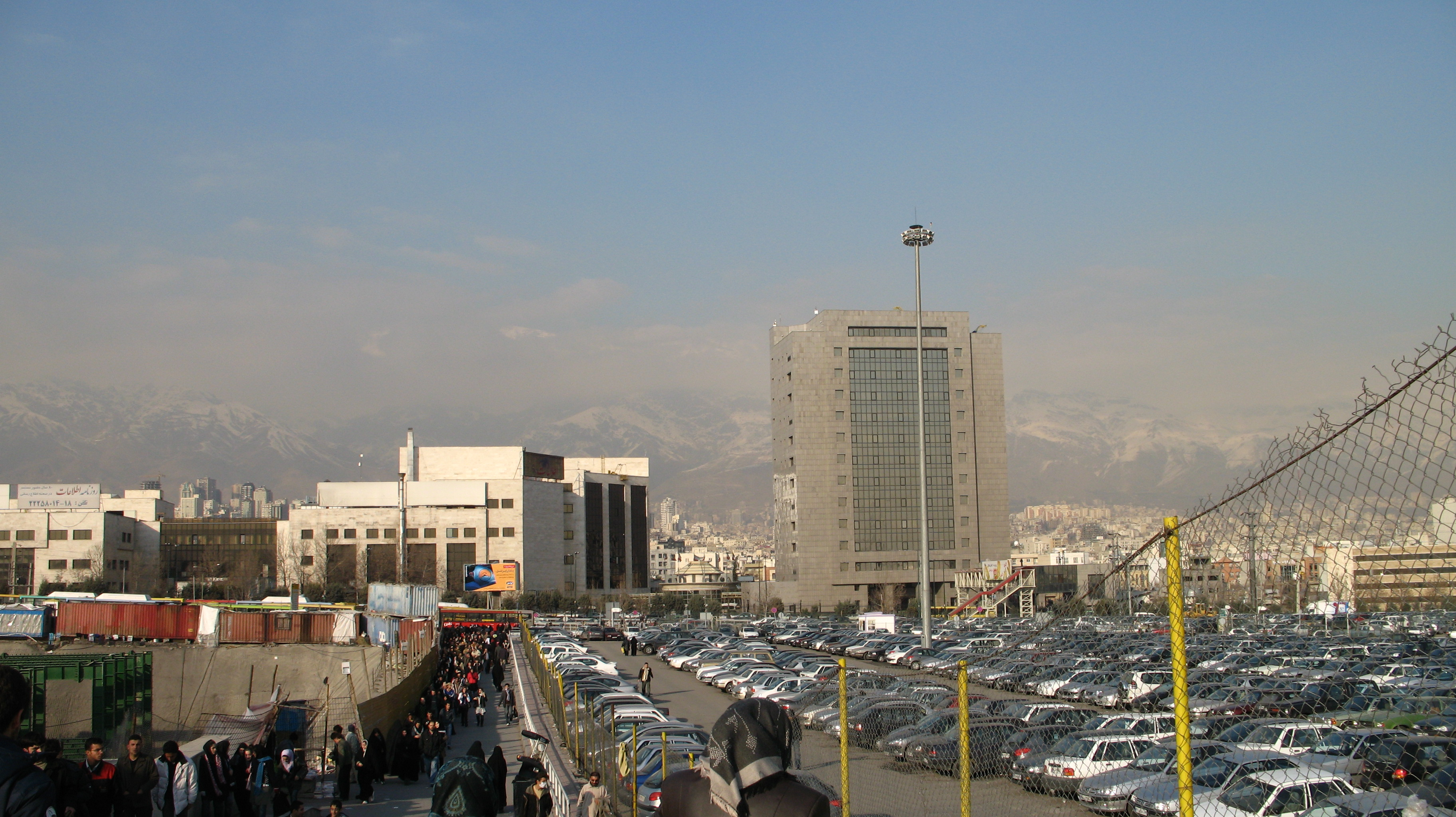

General information
- Location: Mirdamad Boulevard; District 3, Tehran, Tehran County; Iran
- Coordinates: 35°45′36″N 51°26′01″E
- System: Tehran Metro Station
- Operator: Tehran Urban and Suburban Railways Organization (Metro)

History
- Opened: 1388 H-Kh (2009)

Services
Preceding station	Tehran Metro	Following station
Shariati towards Tajrish	Line 1	Shahid Haghani towards Kahrizak
Location

Mirdamad Metro Station is a station in Tehran Metro Line 1, located next to Mirdamad Boulevard. It was opened on 19 May 2009. The station has an outdoor parking facility for commuters.

== Facilities ==
The station has a ticket office, escalators, cash machines, bus routes, pay phones, water fountains, and a lost and found.
