= Meydan-e Jahad Metro Station =

Station of the Tehran Metro

Meydan-e Jahad Metro Station ایستگاه مترو میدان جهاد
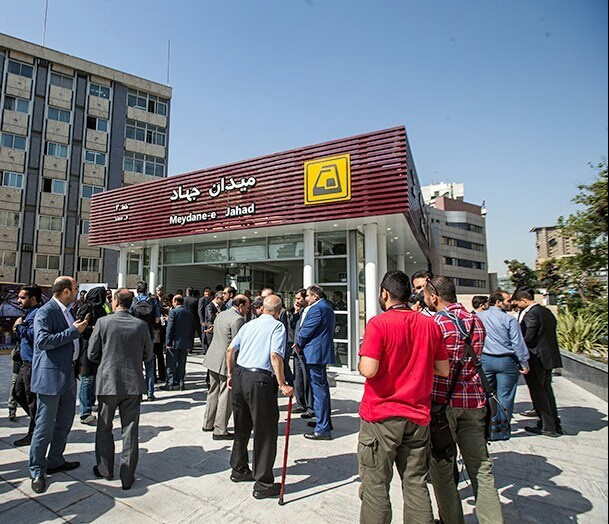

General information
- Location: Valiasr Street- Fatemi Street, District 6, Tehran, Tehran County; Tehran Province, Iran
- System: Tehran Metro Station
- Operator: Tehran Urban and Suburban Railways Organization (Metro)

History
- Opened: 1394 H-Kh (2015)

Services
| Preceding station | Tehran Metro | Following station |
|---|---|---|
| Mirzaye Shirazi towards Ghaem | Line 3 | Meydan-e Vali Asr towards Azadegan |
Location

Meydan-e Jahad Metro Station is a station in line 3 of the Tehran Metro. It is located at the intersection of Valiasr Street and Fatemi Street. The station was planned to be named "Meydan-e Jahad" prior to opening. However, just one day after the official opening, the name was changed "Shohada-ye Resaneh" for the first two months of its operation. However, due to popular complaints about the new name not being reflective of any nearby geographical feature, and the name being unfamiliar to most users, the name was reverted to the initially planned name. This name change cost the Metro Organization about 2 billion tomans.
