= Shahid Beheshti Metro Station =

Station of the Tehran Metro

Shahid Beheshti ایستگاه شهید بهشتی
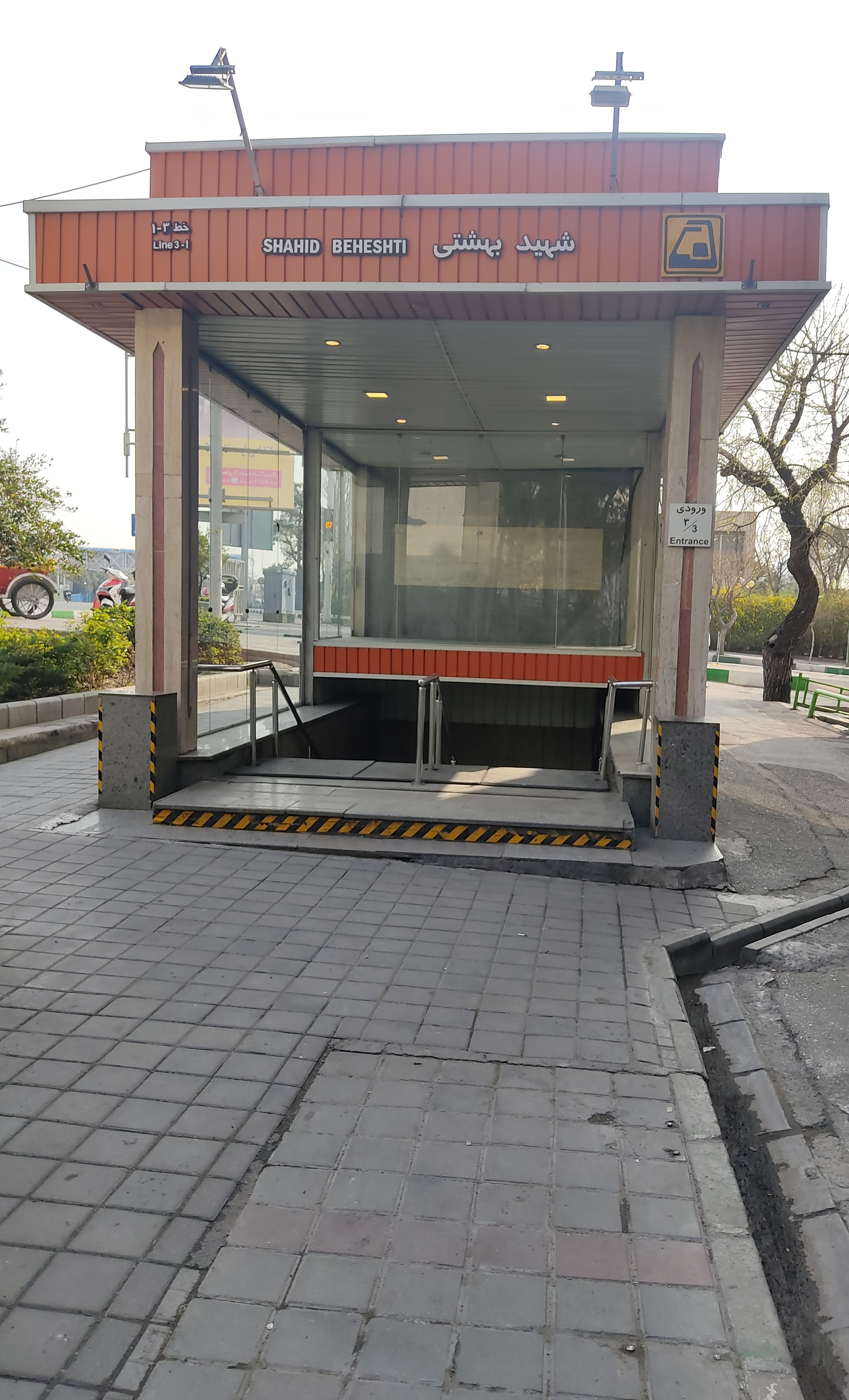

General information
- Location: Beheshti Street- Dr. Mofatteh Street; District 7, Tehran, Tehran County; Tehran Province, Iran
- Coordinates: 35°43′53.87″N 51°25′36.53″E
- System: Tehran Metro Station
- Operator: Tehran Urban and Suburban Railways Organization (Metro)
- Connections: Tehran Buses: 209 Beheshti Term. - Khaghani Bridge; 212 Beheshti Term. - Imam Hossein Sq.; 228 Beheshti Term. - Imam Khomeini H.; 302 Beheshti Term. - Artesh Blvd.; 395 Resalat Sq. - Motahari St.

History
- Opened: 1380 H-Kh (2001)

Services
Preceding station	Tehran Metro	Following station
Mosalla towards Tajrish	Line 1	Shahid Mofatteh towards Kahrizak
Sohrevardi towards Ghaem	Line 3	Mirzaye Shirazi towards Azadegan
Location

Beheshti Metro Station is a station in Tehran Metro Line 1. It is located in the junction of Dr. Mofatteh Street and Beheshti Street. It is the intersection of Line 1 and Line 3. It is between Shahid Mofatteh Metro Station and Mosalla Metro Station on Line 1 and Mirzaye Shirazi Metro Station and Sohrevardi Metro Station on Line 3.
