= Haft-e Tir Square =

Square in Tehran, Iran

Haft-e-Tir Square (Persian: میدان هفتم تیر) is a central cross section in Tehran's central business district. The square was renamed Haft-e-Tir in the years following the Iranian Revolution in 1979. The square was formally renamed after a bombing on 28 June 1981 (the 7th of Tir 1360 (Haft-e Tir - هفت تیر) in the Iranian calendar), a powerful bomb went off at the headquarters of the Iran Islamic Republic Party (IRP) in Tehran, while a meeting of party leaders was in progress. Seventy-three leading officials of the Islamic Republic were killed, including Chief Justice Ayatollah Mohammad Beheshti, (who was the second most powerful figure in the revolution after Ayatollah Khomeini at the time). SAVAK and Iraq were immediately held responsible by Iranian authorities. According to Ervand Abrahamian, "whatever the truth, the Islamic Republic used the incident to wage war on the Left opposition in general and the Mojahedin in particular." According to Kenneth Katzman, "there has been much speculation among academics and observers that these bombings may have actually been planned by senior IRP leaders, to rid themselves of rivals within the IRP."

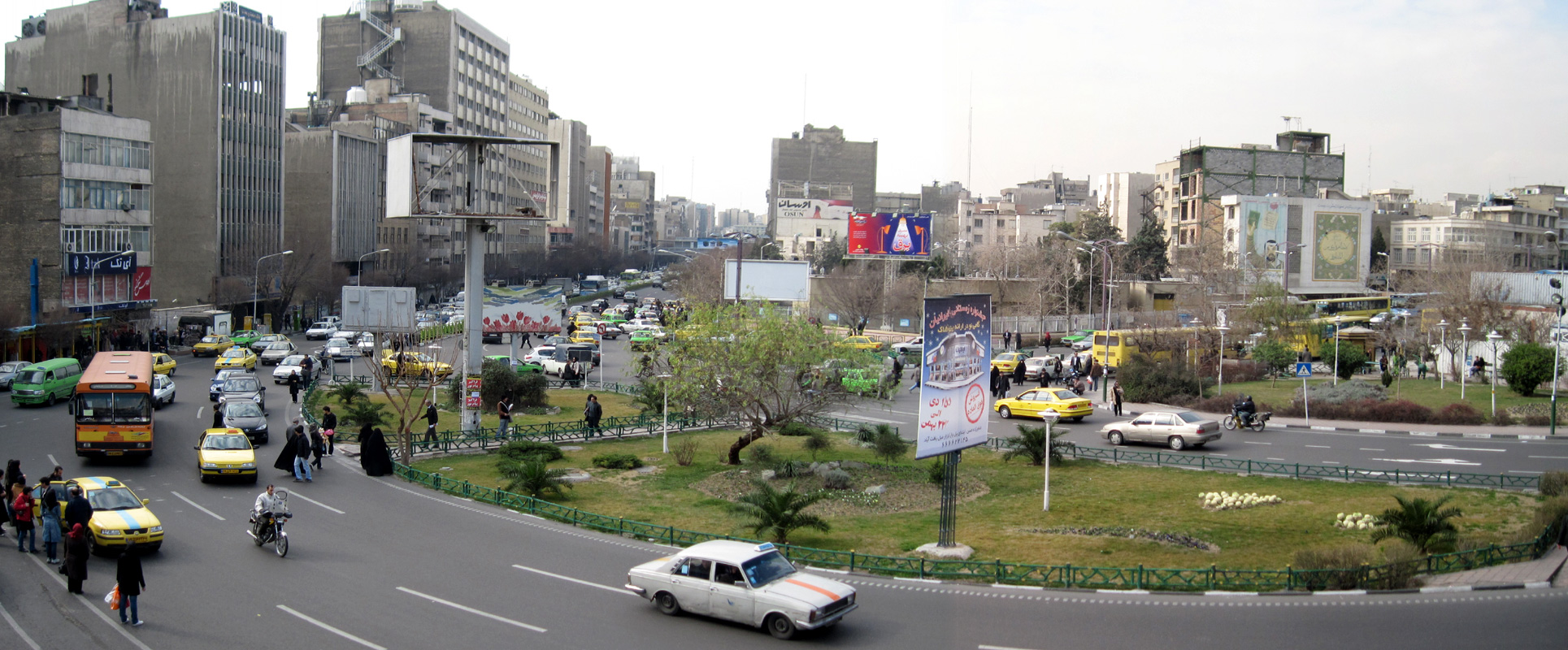
Haft-e-Tir Square, from eastern side

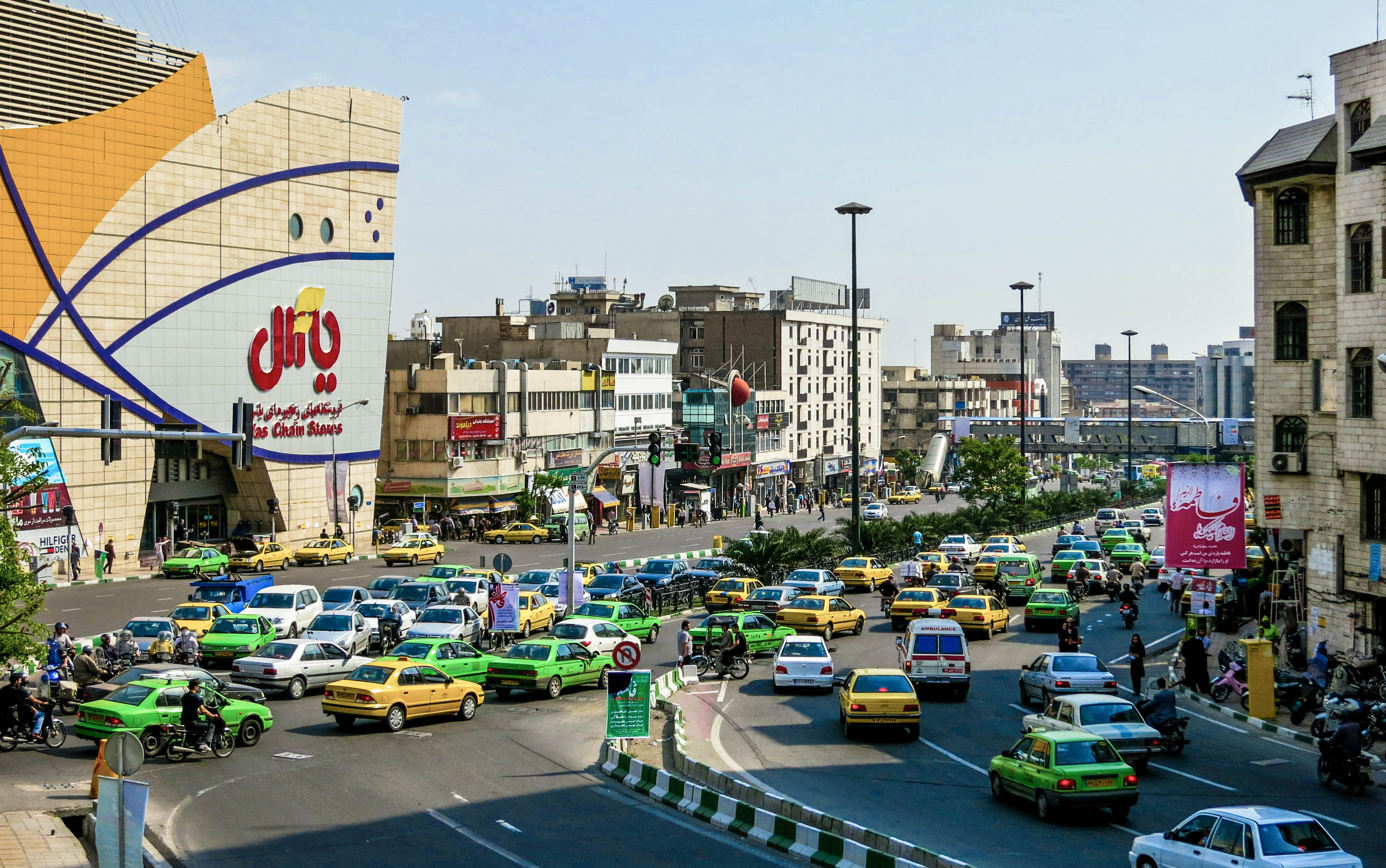
Haft-e-Tir Square, from northern side

Previously Haft-e-Tir was known as 25th Shahrivar Square, which was a name given by the former pre-revolutionary Pahlavi government up until the revolution.

== Flashpoint ==
In 2009 during the post election protests against newly re-elected President Mahmoud Ahmadinejad the area was known as an area of protest. In 2012 Haft-e-Tir again became the scene of large gatherings when thousands of people cheered on president-elect Hassan Rouhani who had just won the country's election with a landslide. Rouhani also had his main election campaign headquarters of the Karim Khan Street of the square.

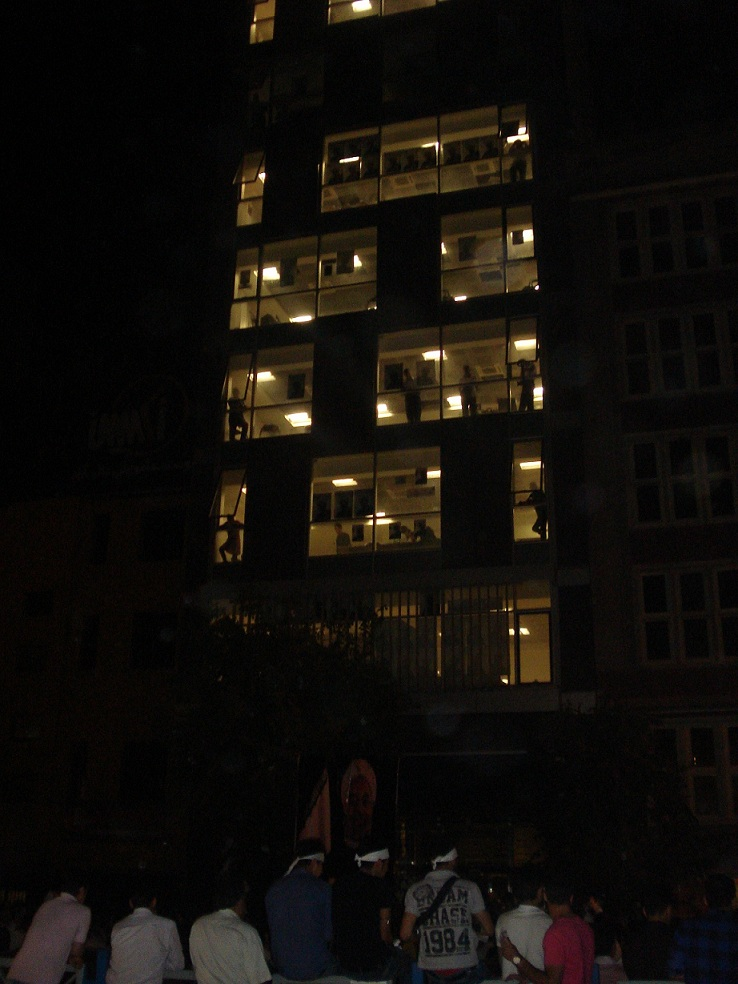
Hassan Rouhani presidential campaign headquarters in Tehran

== Transport ==
The square is connected to Karimkhan Zand Avenune to its west, to its north-north west it is connected to the Modarres Highway, running north to south of the square Mofatteh Street and to its north west it is connected by Ghaem Magham St.

== Metro Link ==
Haft-e-Tir Square is also connected to Line 1and 6 of the Tehran Metro service.

== Shopping ==
Situated around the square are multiple shops selling all sorts of items.
