= Mosalla Metro Station =

Station of the Tehran Metro

Mosalla Imam Khomeini ایستگاه مترو مصلای امام خمینی

General information
- Location: Tehran Mosalla, Resalat Exp'way; District 7, Tehran, Tehran County; Tehran Province, Iran
- Coordinates: 35°44′23.92″N 51°25′40.54″E
- System: Tehran Metro Station
- Operator: Tehran Urban and Suburban Railways Organization (Metro)
- Connections: Tehran BRT: BRT 5; Tehran Buses: 234 Haghani Metro-Piruzan Sq.; 368 Seyyed Khandan-Azadi Term.; 386 Resalat Sq.-Afriqa Int.; 396 Tehranpars 3rd Sq.-Motahari St.; 400 Resalat Sq.-San'at Sq.; 905 Elm-o-Sanat Metro-Beyhaqqi Term.

History
- Opened: 1380 H-Kh (2001)

Services
Preceding station	Tehran Metro	Following station
Shahid Hemmat towards Tajrish	Line 1	Shahid Beheshti towards Kahrizak
Location

Mosalla Imam Khomeini Metro Station is a station in Tehran Metro Line 1. It is located in Mosalla-ye Tehran next to Resalat Expressway. It is between Shahid Beheshti Metro Station and Shahid Hemmat Metro Station.
