= Shahid Haghani Expressway =

Expressway in Tehran, Iran

Shahid Haghani Expressway
- بزرگراه شهید حقّانی
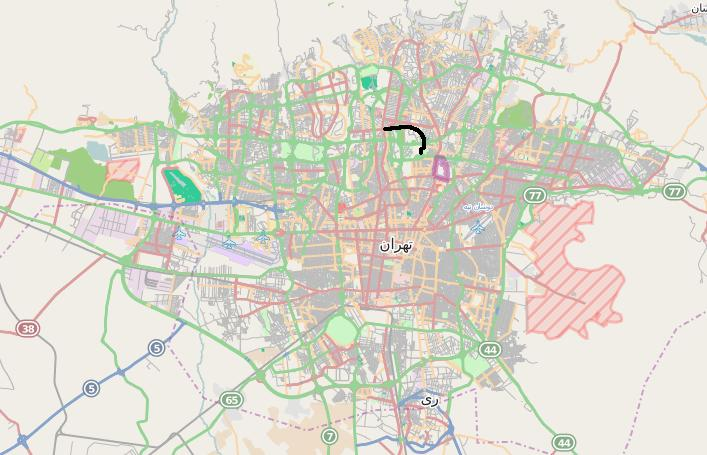

Route information
- Length: 4.2 km (2.6 mi)

Major junctions
- Southeast end: Resalat Expressway; Arabali Street
- Northwest end: Vanak Square

Location
- Country: Iran
- Major cities: Tehran

Highway system
- Highways in Iran; Freeways

Shahid Haghani Expressway (Highway) is an expressway in Tehran. It starts from Resalat Expressway and ends in Vanak Square.

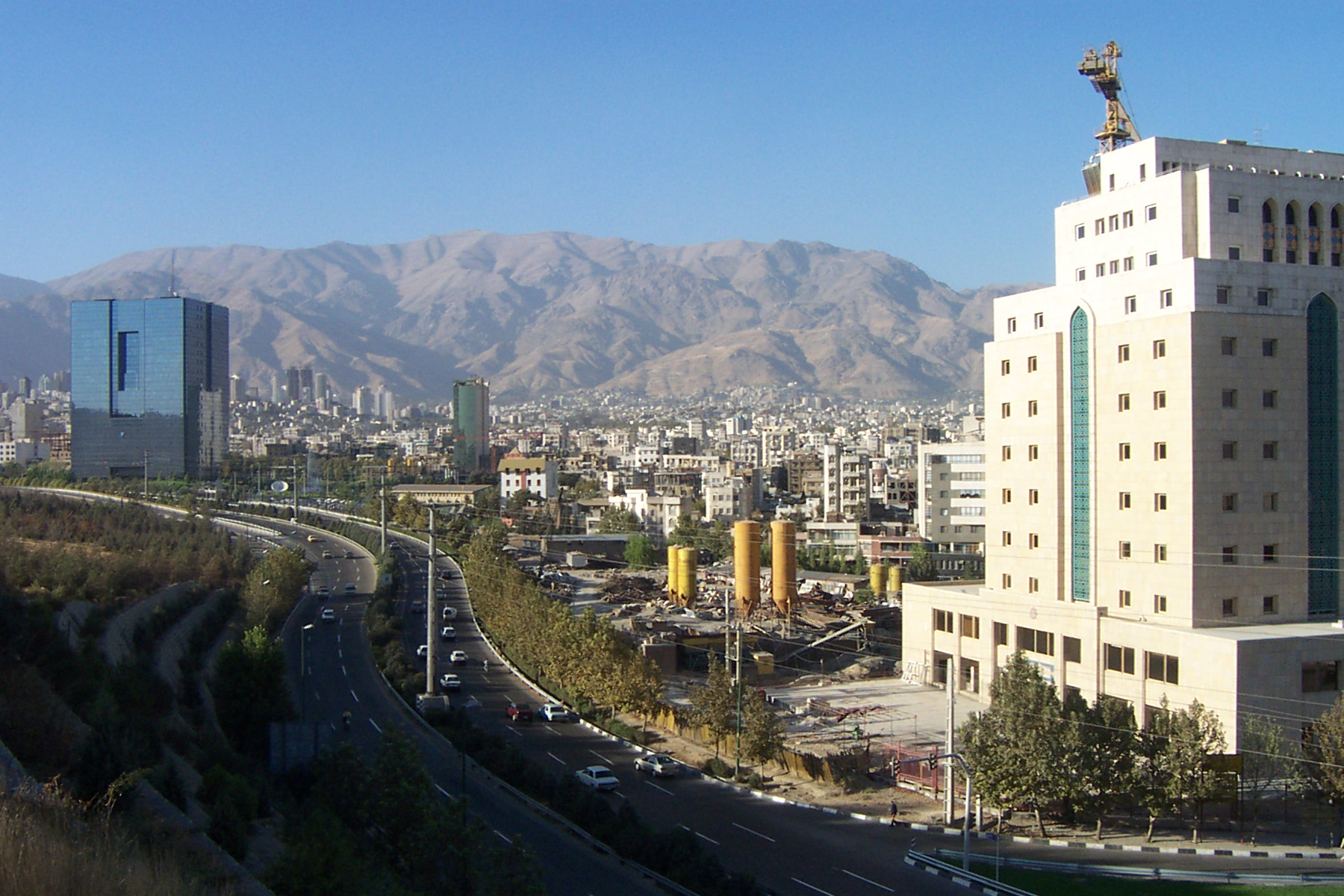
Haghani Expressway in front of National Library of Iran and the Main Building of Central Bank of Iran

The expressway has 4 exits with 3 irregular Partial cloverleaf interchange and 1 traffic circle. There are three lanes of traffic in either direction for most of the length of the roadway. Traffic at Resalat Expressway enters and exits from Arabali Street. At Vanak Square, traffic feeds from four different streets (Valiasr Street, Vanak Street, Molia Sadra Street, Brazil Street).

From Southeast to Northwest
	Resalat Expressway; Arabali Street
	Hemmat Expressway
	Iran National Library
	Naft Street
Shahid Haghani Metro Station
	Modares Expressway
	Africa Boulevard
	Gandi Street
Vanak Square	Valiasr Street; Vanak Street; Mollasadra Street; Abbaspour Street
From Northwest to Southeast

== Attractions along expressway ==
- Taleghani Forest Park
- National Library
- Behesht Madaran Park
- Azadegan Park
