= Mirzaye Shirazi Metro Station =

Station of the Tehran Metro

Mirzaye Shirazi Metro Station ایستگاه مترو میرزای شیرازی
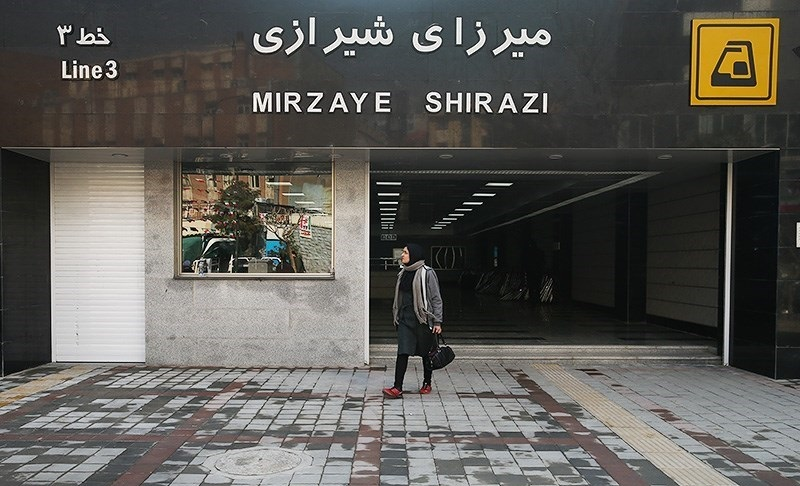

General information
- Location: Shahid Beheshti Street, District 6, Tehran, Tehran County; Tehran Province, Iran
- System: Tehran Metro Station
- Operator: Tehran Urban and Suburban Railways Organization (Metro)
- Connections: Tehran Buses: 228 Beheshti Term. - Imam Khomeini H.; 358 Beihaghi Term. - Ferdowsi St.; 395 Resalat Sq. - Motahari St.; 396 Tehranpars 3rd Sq. - Motahari St.

History
- Opened: 1394 H-Kh (10 February 2016)

Services
Preceding station	Tehran Metro	Following station
Shahid Beheshti towards Ghaem	Line 3	Meydan-e Jahad towards Azadegan
Location

Mirzaye Shirazi Metro Station is a station in line 3 of the Tehran Metro. It is located on Shahid Behesthi Street's intersection with Mirza-ye Shirazi Street in Central Tehran's District 6. The station was opened on February 10, 2016.
