= Vanak =

Neighbourhood in Tehran, Iran

Coordinates: 35°45′35″N 51°23′43″E

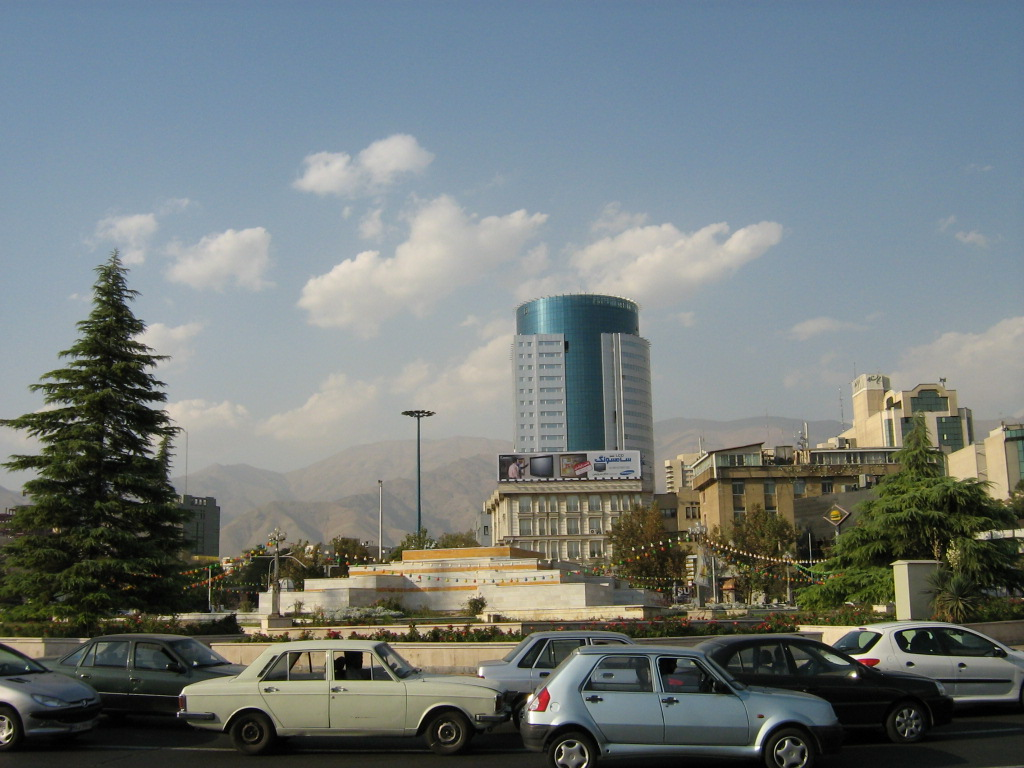
Vanak square in Tehran

Vanak (Persian: ونک) is a neighbourhood in the northern part of Tehran, capital of Iran. There is a square and a street named after it. The word Vanak means "Small (ash) Tree" in Persian.

The name derives from the original older village of Vanak (Deh-e Vanak) in the area, and today there is also a square called Vanak nearby. Vanak is one of the most important junctures in Tehran and the midpoint for some of the city's highways such as the Jahan-Kudak (now Haghani), Chamran, Hemmat and Modarres.

A small Armenian community has lived near the Vanak village for a very long time. Today the Ararat Sports Complex is the largest sports complex of Armenian Iranians. The complex is located near Vanak square.

Vanak is an affluent neighbourhood with highrise commercial buildings, a golf course, chic cafés and malls, and a funfair called Funfair which has not been in operation since 1995.

Mostowfi ol-Mamalek, a former prime minister of Iran during the late Qajar and early Pahlavi eras, is buried in a private residence in Vanak neighbourhood.

== Other places with the same name in Iran ==
There is a village with the same name in Farahan (Ashtian) in Markazi province. Probably Mirza Hassan Ashtiani Mostowfi ol-Mamalek is from this village.

In addition there is another town with the same name (Vanak) near Semirom in Isfahan province. The border of this multi purpose district start from the seoul street on the north and it diverge into the Chamaran and sheykh Bahayi street on the right and left. Vanak reaches to its end in the hemmat expressway. Hashemi Rafsanjani Expressway, another important highway in Tehran, passes through the northern part of vanak region.[1]
