= Ghaem Magham =

Park in Tabriz, Iran

Coordinates: 38°04′25.58″N 46°18′01.84″E

Ghaem Magham park (Persian: بوستان قائم‌مقام) is a small park in Sheshghelan suburb of Tabriz, north-western Iran.

== See also ==
- Tabriz
- Shah-goli
