= Mirdamad Boulevard =

Boulevard in Tehran, Iran

Coordinates: 35°45′34″N 51°26′12″E

Mirdamad Boulevard بلوار میرداماد
- Interactive map of Mirdamad Boulevard بلوار میرداماد
- Length: 3.3 km (2.1 mi)
- Location: Tehran
- From: Valiasr Street
- To: Shariati Street

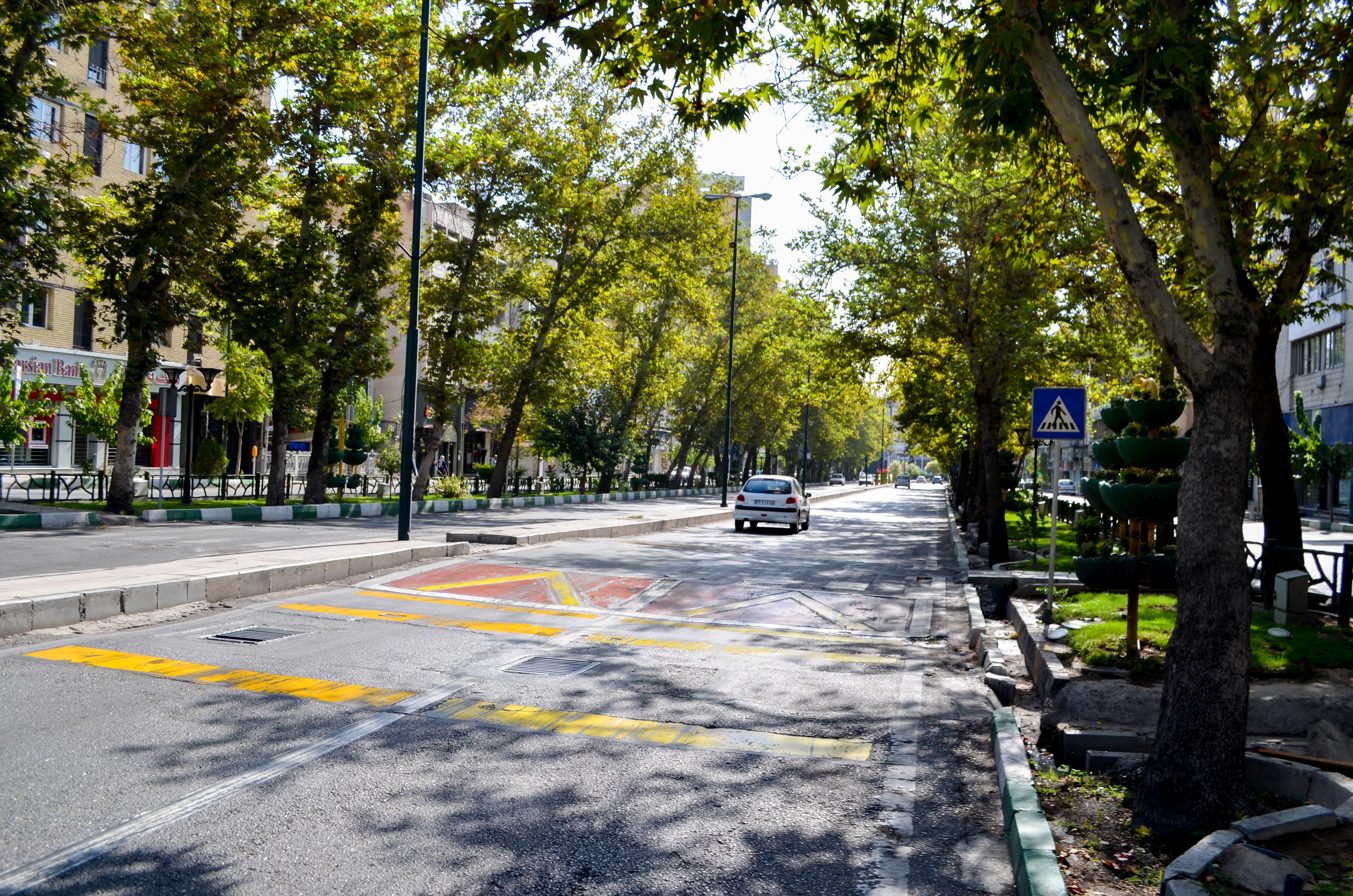
Mirdamad Boulevard

Mirdamad Boulevard is the center of Davoodiyeh district in the north of Tehran. The boulevard starts from Valiasr Street in its west and continues eastward, passing Mother Square up to Shariati Street. Central Bank of the Islamic Republic of Iran is located on this boulevard.

A statue in Mirdamad Square in Davoodiyeh

Mirdamad Boulevard has regional, cultural, and commercial importance. In 2022, this was one of the streets on which Iranians protested along as part of the Woman, Life, Freedom movement.

There are some other important buildings in this boulevard too, for example, Eskan Towers, Paytakht Computer Center, and Arian Mall. There are also some classy boutiques and malls in Mirdamad, most of which are located in the eastern part of the street, near Maadar Square (commonly known as Mohseni), where you can find high-end shops, and this district is popular among the youth of the region.

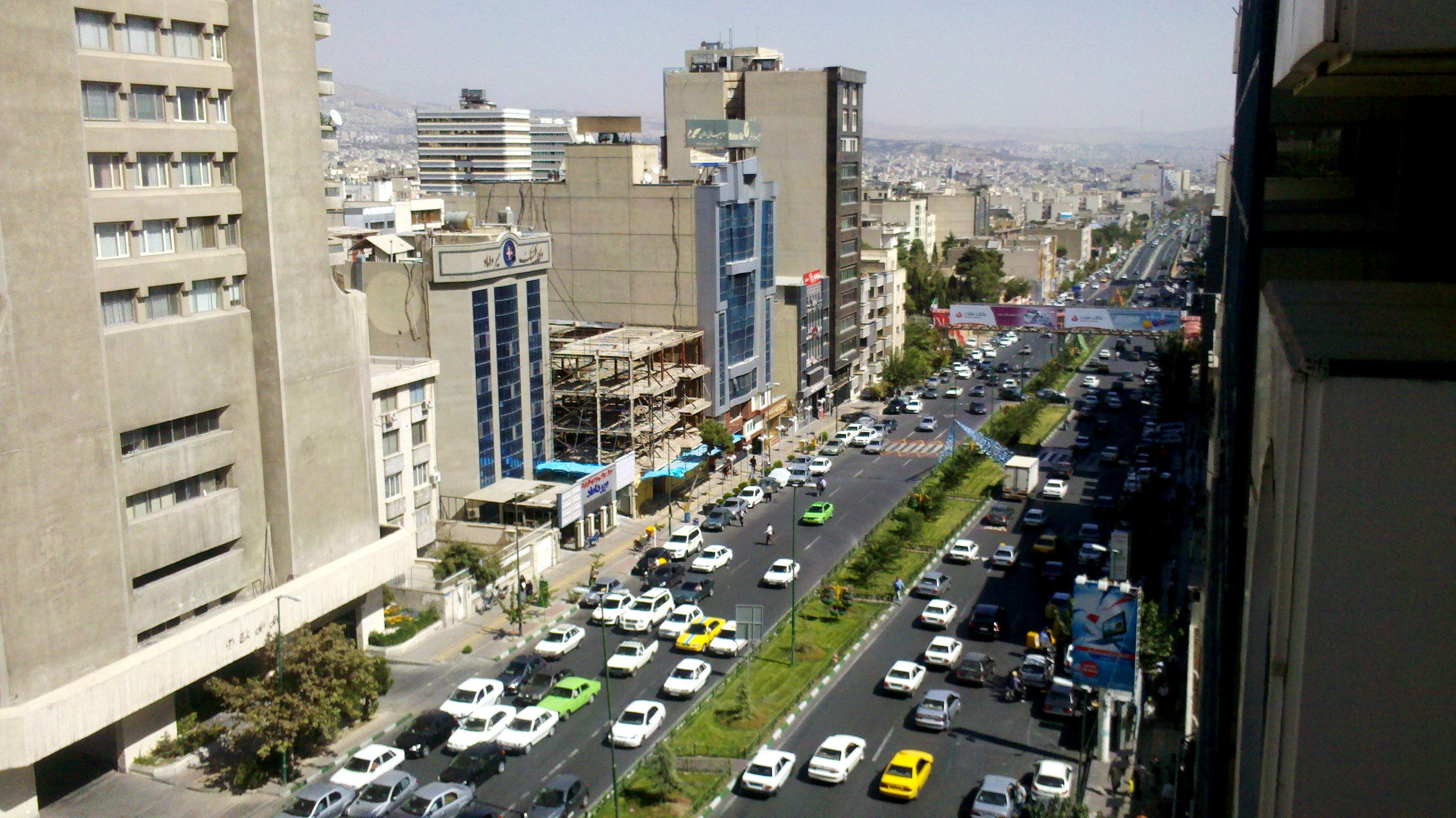
Mirdamad Boulevard on the Western end

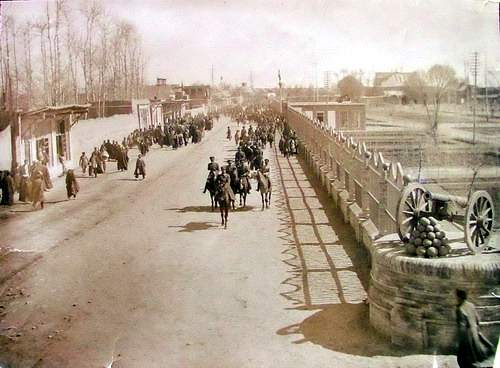
Oldest Known Photo of Mirdamad Boulevard - 1869

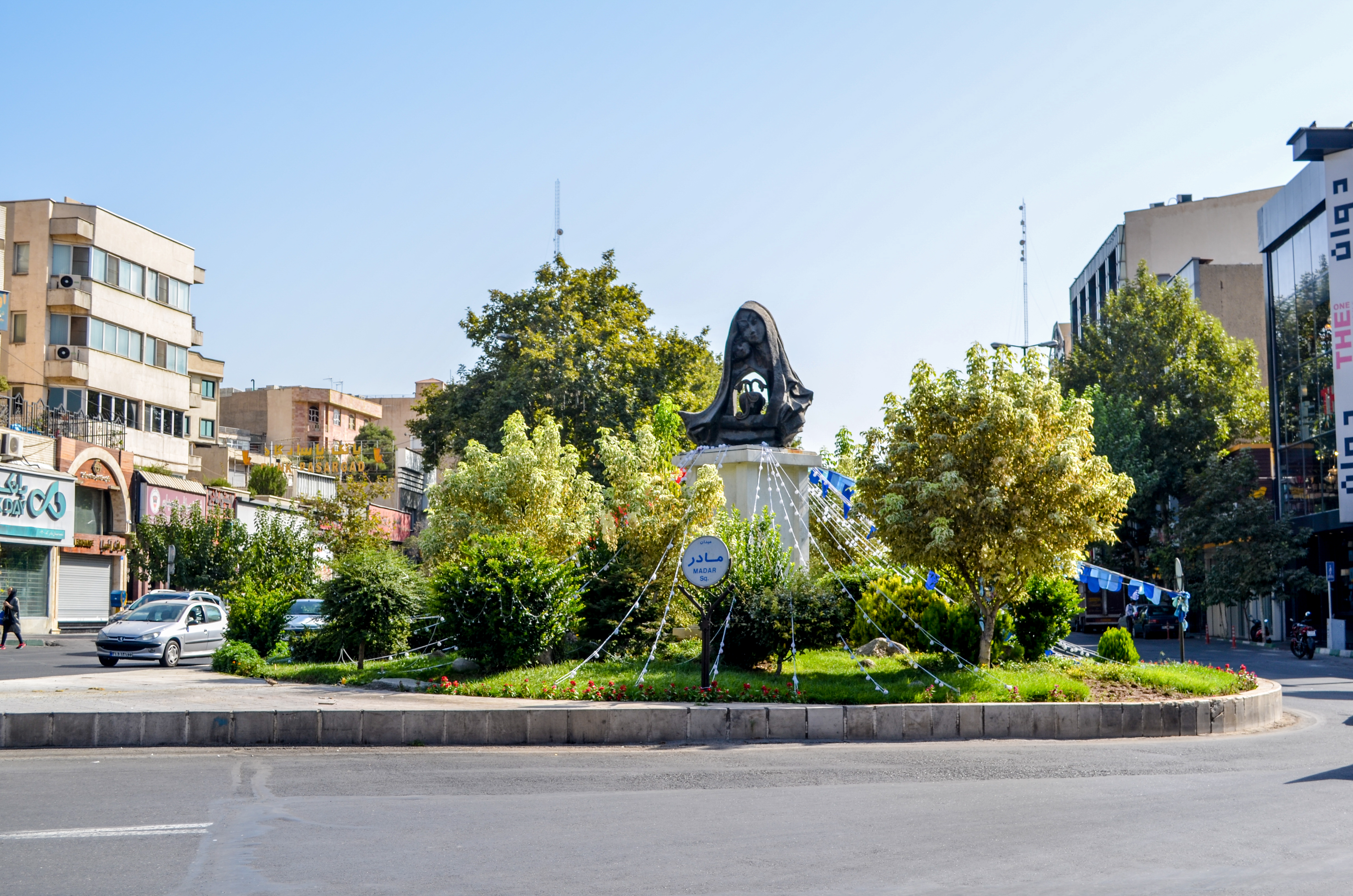
Mother Square at Mirdamad Boulevard

Introduction of Mirdamad boulevard and Eskan complexes

From West to East
	Valiasr Street
	Africa Boulevard; Modares Expressway
Mirdamad Metro Station
	Naft Street
Madar Square	Shahnazari Street; Vaziripour Street; Behruz Street
	Shariati Street
From East to West

== Gallery ==
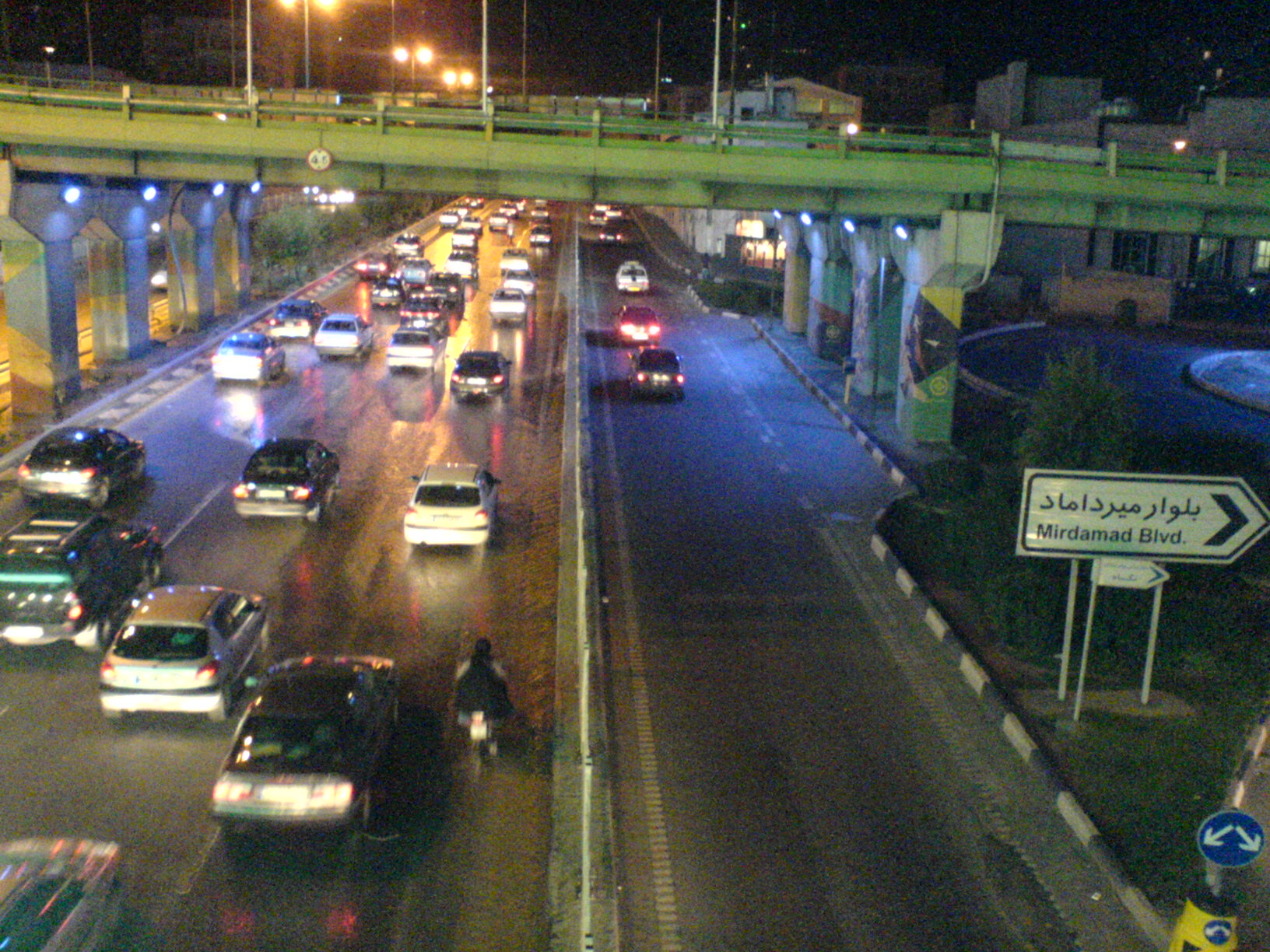
Modares Expressway at Mirdamad Boulevard

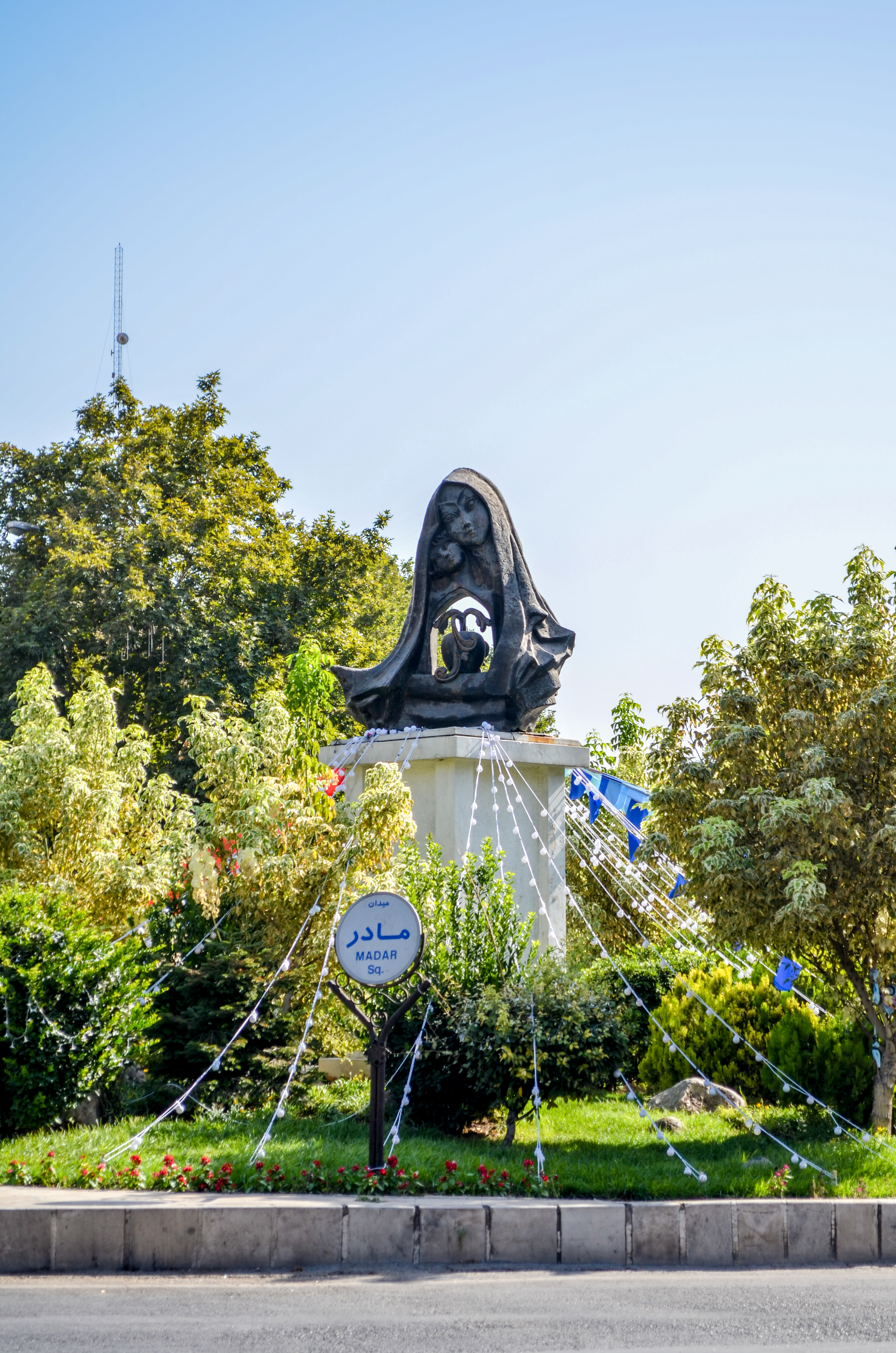
Mother Square (also known as Mohseni Square)

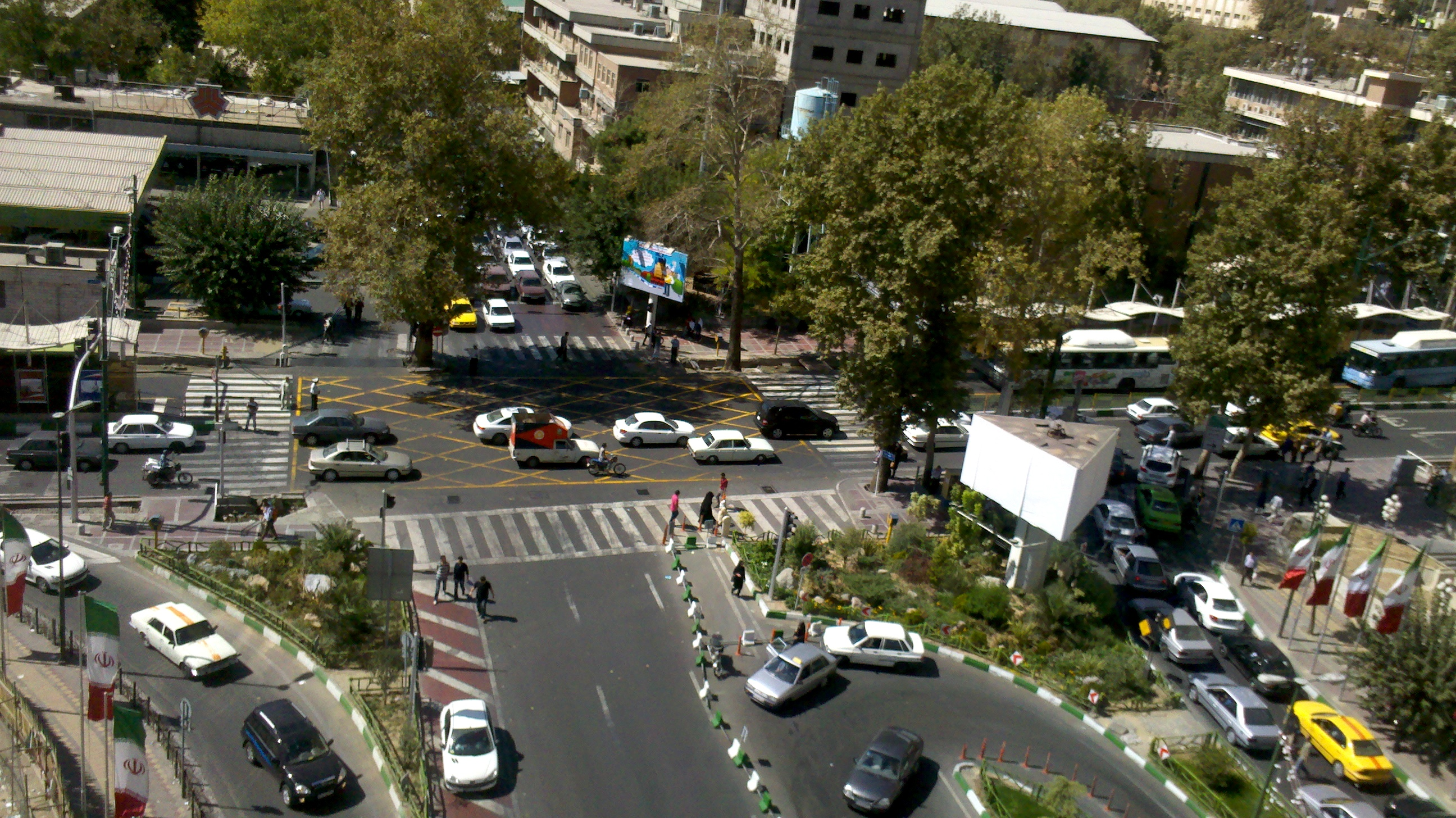
Intersection of Valiasr Street and Mirdamad Boulevard

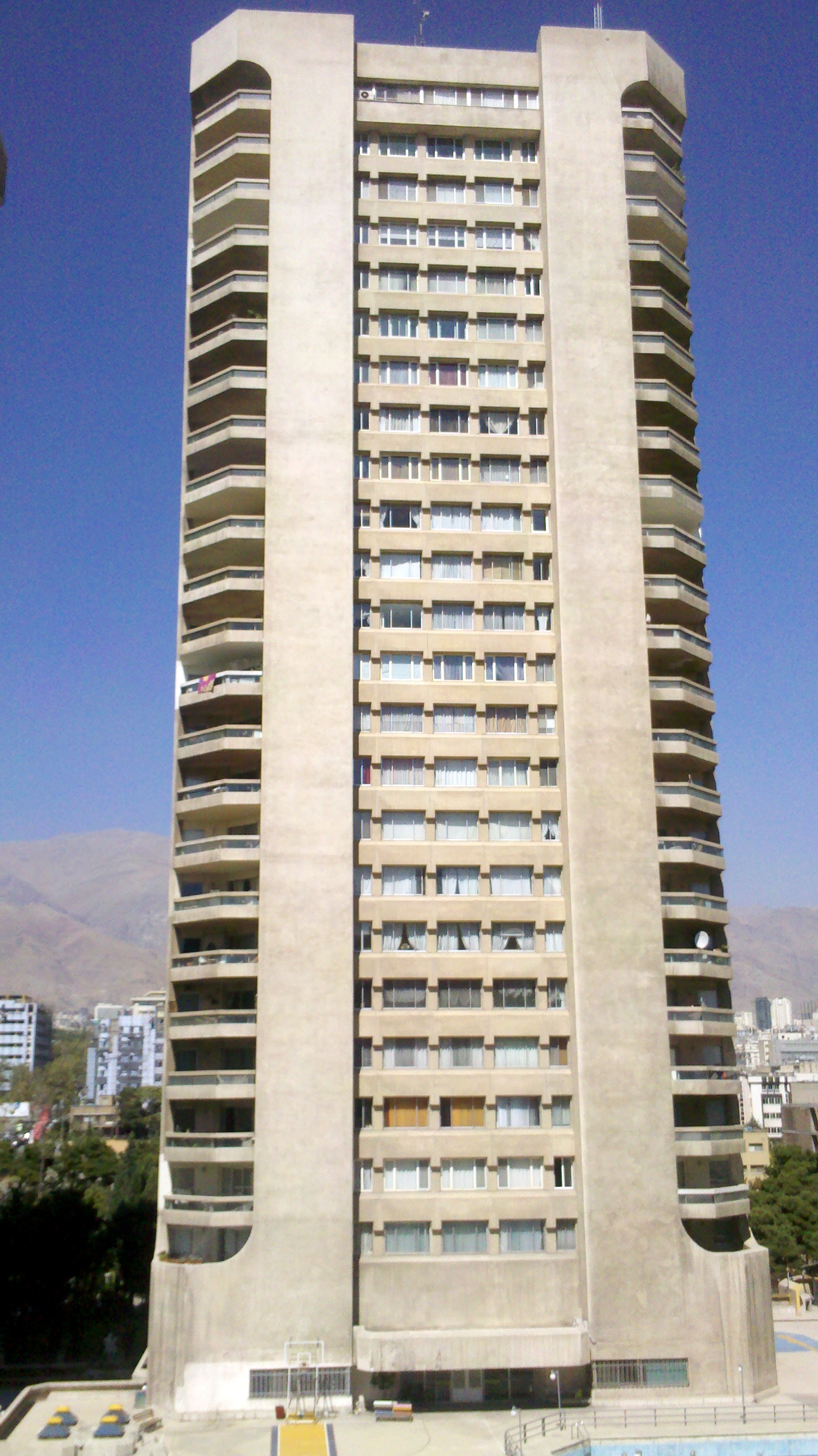
Eskan residential and commercial complex

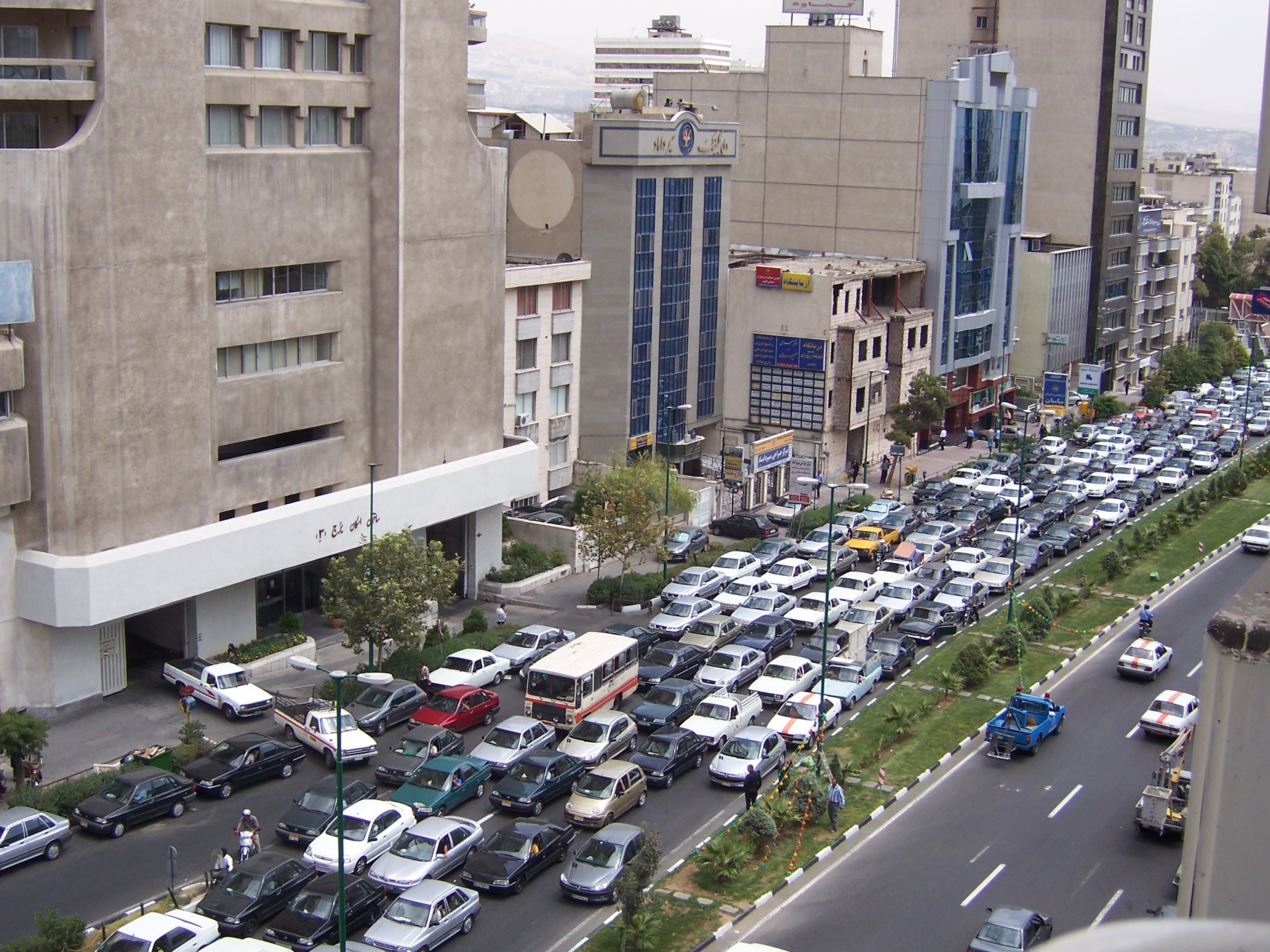
A view from Mirdamad Boulevard

== See also ==
- Parvin Etesami Private High School & Pre-University Center, located in the Mirdamad neighborhood.
