= Meydan-e Vali Asr Metro Station =

Station of the Tehran Metro

Meydan-e Vali Asr Metro Station ایستگاه مترو میدان ولیعصر

General information
- Location: Valiasr Square, District 6, Tehran, Tehran County; Tehran Province, Iran
- System: Tehran Metro Station
- Operator: Tehran Urban and Suburban Railways Organization (Metro)
- Connections: Tehran BRT: BRT 7 · 107 Rahahan-Tajrish · 152 Rahahan-Parkway; Tehran Buses: 227 Valiasr Sq.-Shahrak-e Valfajr; 236 Valiasr Sq.-Kuy-e Nasr; 267 Beyhaghi Term.-Enqelab Sq.; 306 Valiasr Sq.-Piruzan St.; 310 Valiasr Sq.-Barari Term.; 314 Valiasr Sq.-Mo'allem St.; 355 Haft-e Tir-Azadi Sq.; 360 Valiasr Sq.-Imam Khomeini Sq.; 371 2nd Sadeghiyeh-Haft-e Tir; 372 2nd Sadeghiyeh-Valiasr Sq.; 379 Valiasr Sq.-Shamshiri

History
- Opened: 1393 H-Kh (2 March 2015) Line3; 1401H-Kh (18 March 2023)

Services
Preceding station	Tehran Metro	Following station
Meydan-e Jahad towards Ghaem	Line 3	Teatr-e Shahr towards Azadegan
Location

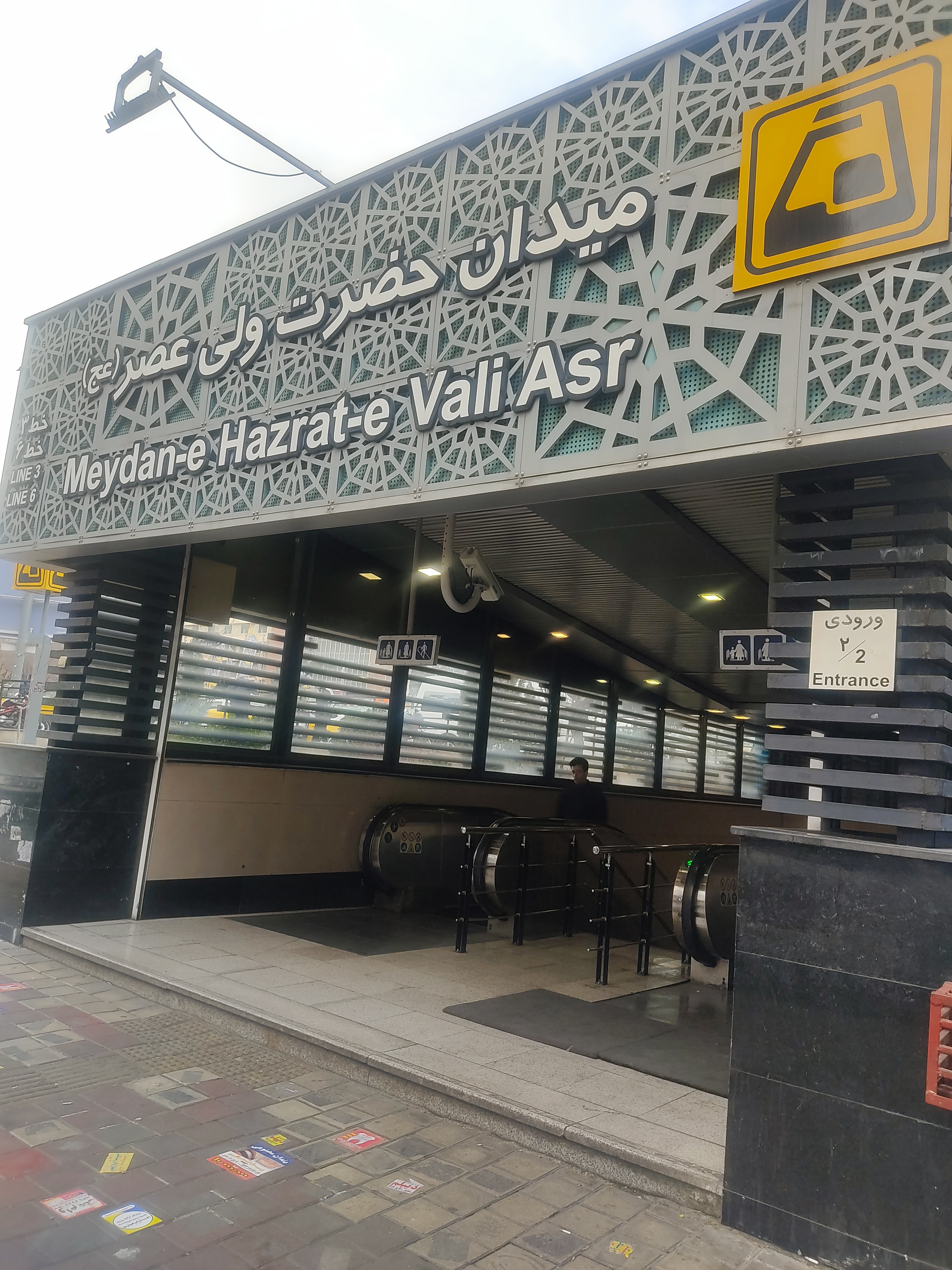
Entrance to the station c. 2025

Meydan-e Vali Asr Metro Station is a station in line 3&6 of the Tehran Metro. It is located in Valiasr Square.
