= Modarres Expressway =

Expressway in Tehran, Iran

Modarres Expressway
- بزرگراه مدرّس

Route information
- Length: 8.7 km (5.4 mi)

Major junctions
- North end: Chamran Expressway; Valiasr Street
- South end: Haft-e Tir Square

Location
- Country: Iran
- Major cities: Tehran

Highway system
- Highways in Iran; Freeways

Modarres Expressway (Persian: بزرگراه مدرس), prior to 1979 Iranian Revolution known as the Shahanshahi Expressway (Persian: بزرگراه شاهنشاهی; English: Imperial Expressway) is an expressway in Tehran. It starts from north of Tehran at the end of Chamran Expressway in Elahiyeh and goes south and ends in Haft-e Tir Square. It is named after Hassan Modarres.

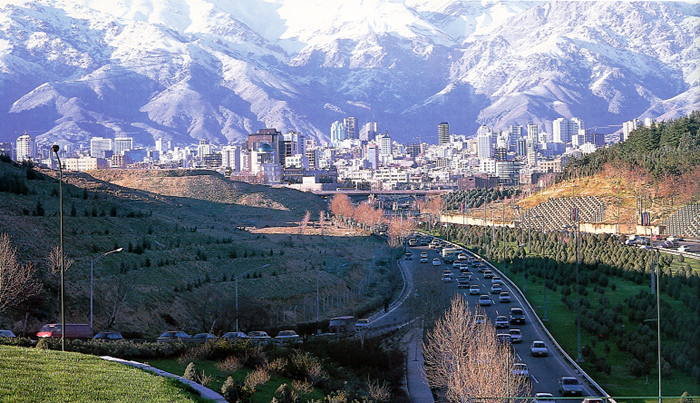
North face view of Modarres Expressway

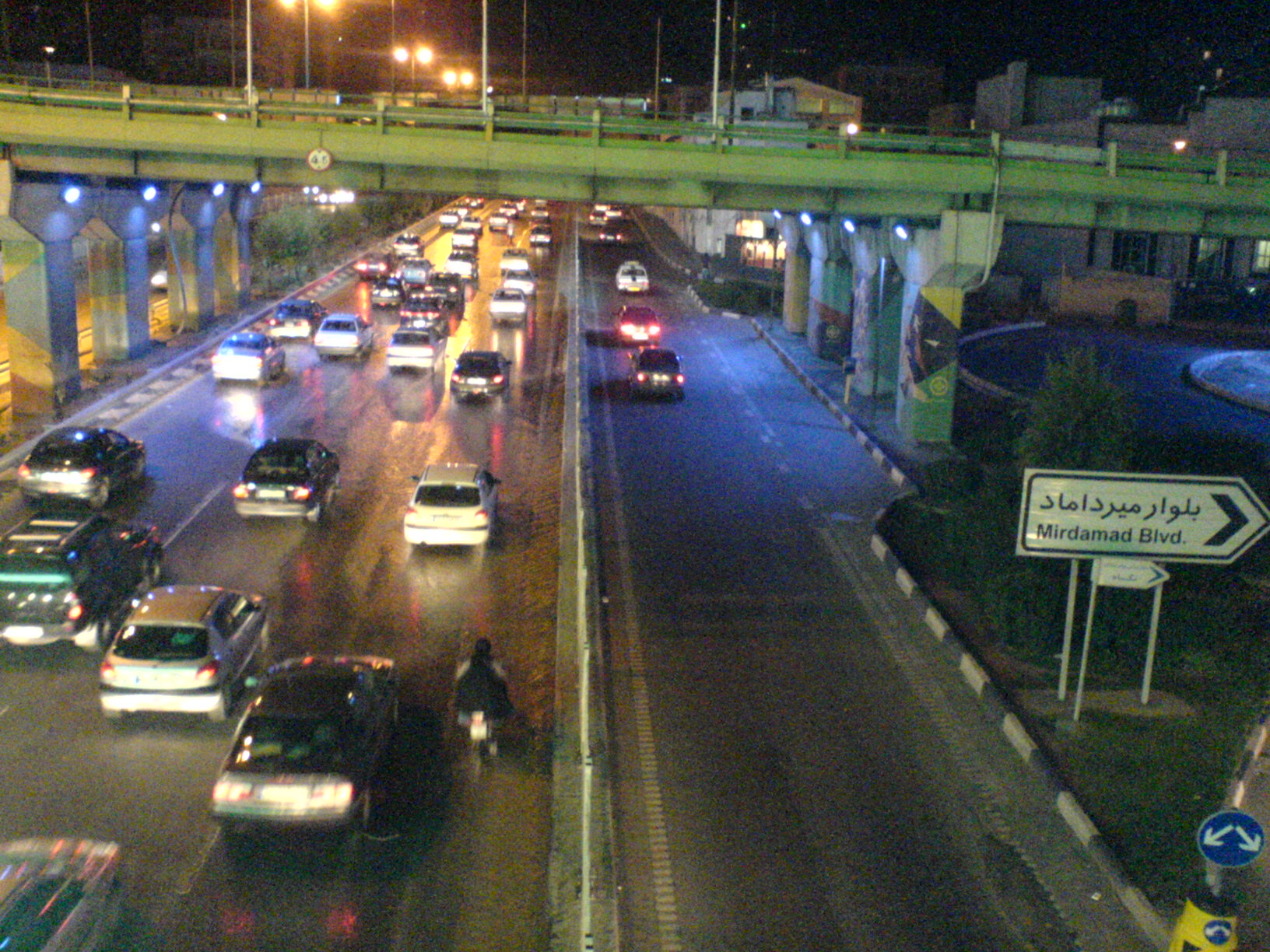
Modarres Expressway at Mirdamad Boulevard

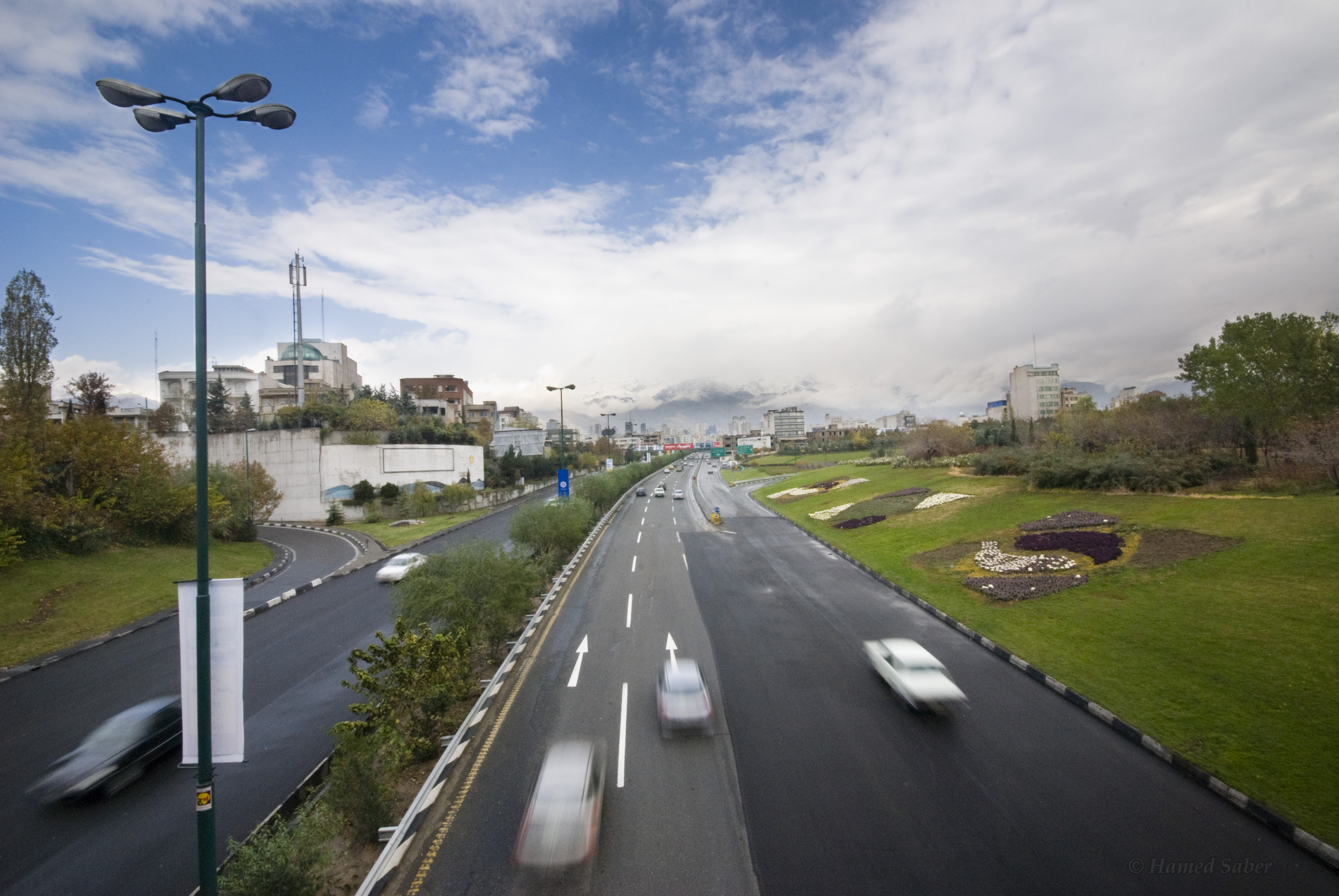

From North to South
	Chamran Expressway; Valiasr Street
	Africa Boulevard
	Sadr Expressway
	Arash Street
	Dastgerdi Street
	Mirdamad Boulevard
	Shahid Haghani Expressway
Fajr Interchange	Hemmat Expressway
	Resalat Expressway
	Aqaqia Street
	Beihaghi Street
	Beheshti Street
	Ostad Motahari Street
Haft-e Tir Square	Karimkhan Zand Boulevard; Dr. Mofatteh Street; Bahar-e Shiraz Street; Qaem Maqam Farahani Street
From South to North
