= Narmak =

Neighbourhood in Tehran, Iran

Coordinates: 35°45′N 51°31′E

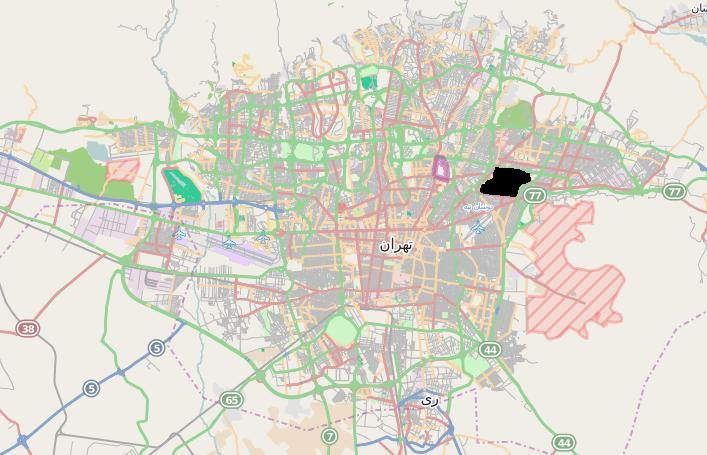
Narmak in Tehran map (black)

Narmak (Persian: نارمک) is a neighbourhood in north-east Tehran, the capital of Iran. It was designed by French consultants in the 1950s as part of a modernization effort introduced by Reza Shah. The name means "new city" in Persian.

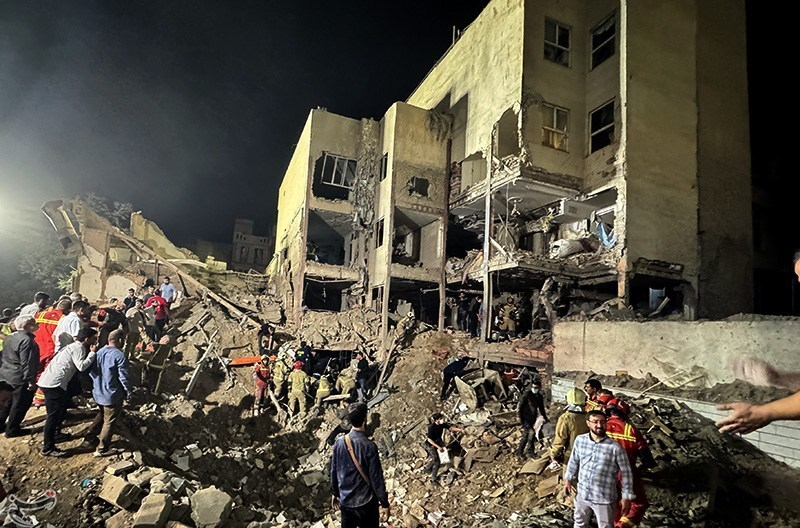
Damage to a residential building in Narmak following an Israeli airstrike, June 2025

Located in the 4th and 8th regions, it has 100 little squares named by numbers like "Meidan 68" (68th Square). Some of these squares, such as Haft Hoz and Resalat, are large squares. The largest square in Narmak is the 73rd square and the smallest is the 99th. Some famous streets like Ayat, Hengam, Farjam, Dardasht, Golbarg, Samangan, Saani, and the Resalat Expressway are located in this neighbourhood.

The Iran University of Science and Technology is based in Narmak. There are four metro stations in Narmak named Elm-o-Sanat University, Sarsabz, Golbarg and Fadak. Narmak borders Shemiran-no to the north, Tehranpars to the east, Shamsabad to the west, and Vahidiyeh and Tehranno to the south.
