= Shahid Bagheri Metro Station =

Station of the Tehran Metro

Shahidan Bagheri Metro Station ایستگاه مترو شهیدان باقری
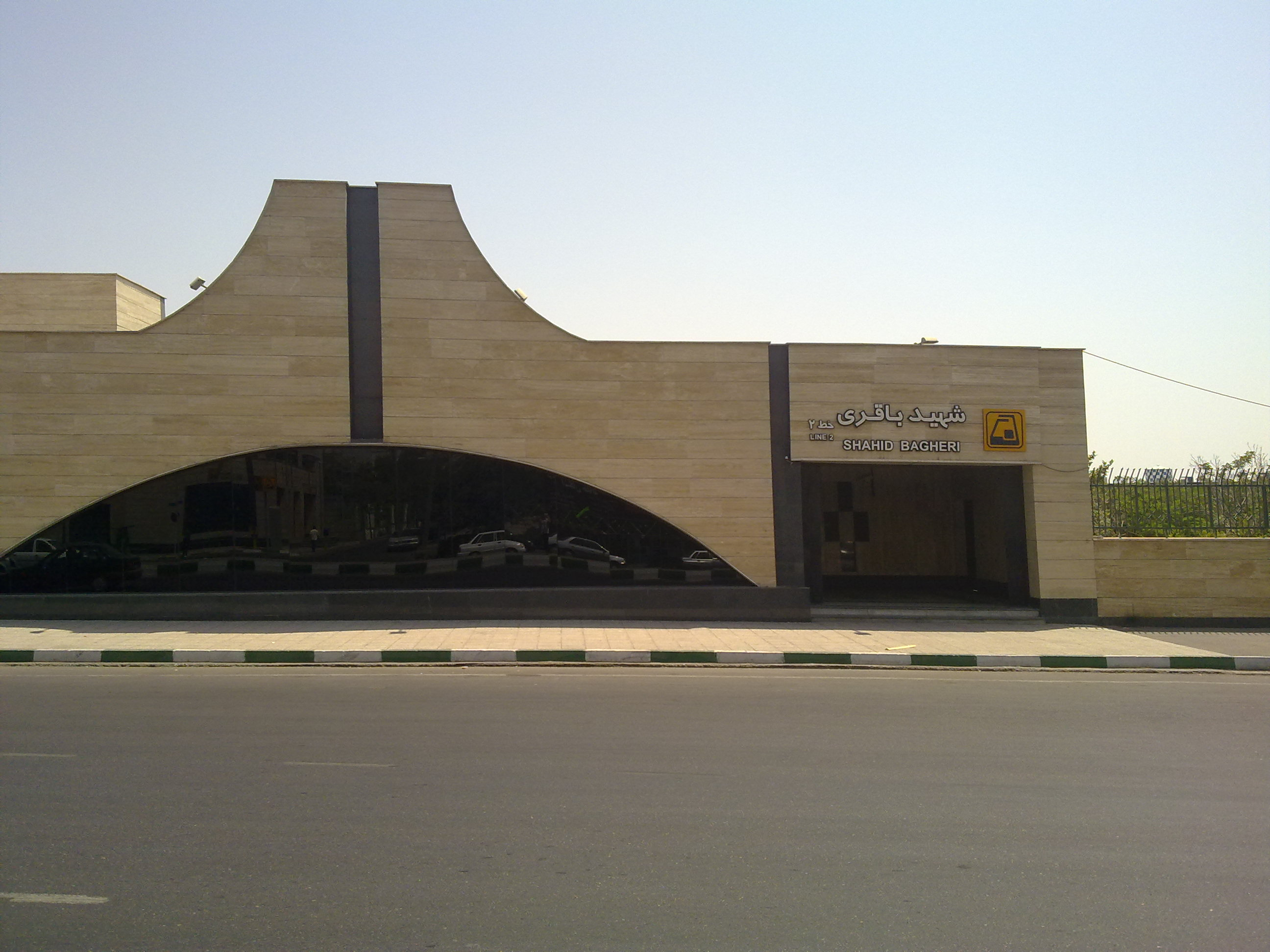

General information
- Location: Resalat Expressway- Bagheri Expressway; Districts 4-8, Tehran, Tehran County; Iran
- Coordinates: 35°43′58″N 51°30′59″E
- System: Tehran Metro Station
- Operator: Tehran Urban and Suburban Railways Organization (Metro)
- Connections: Tehran Buses: 206 Shahid Barari Term. - Elm-o San'at Term.; 224 Ofogh Blvd. - Elm-o San'at Term.; 382 Zeyn od-Din Exp -Elm-o San'at Term.; 399 Elm-o San'at Term. - Shahrak-e Beheshti; 401 Imam Hossein University - Elm-o San'at Term.

History
- Opened: 1387 H-Kh (2008)

Services
| Preceding station | Tehran Metro | Following station |
|---|---|---|
| Elm-o-Sanat University towards Tehran (Sadeghiyeh) | Line 2 | Tehranpars towards Farhangsara |
Location

Shahidan Bagheri Metro Station is a station in Tehran Metro Line 2, in Iran. It is located in the junction of Resalat Expressway and Tehranpars Expressway. It is between Tehranpars Metro Station and Elm-o-Sanat University Metro Station.

This metro station has eight escalators and two elevators
