= Mellat Metro Station =

Metro station in Tehran, Iran

Mellat Metro Station ایستگاه مترو ملت
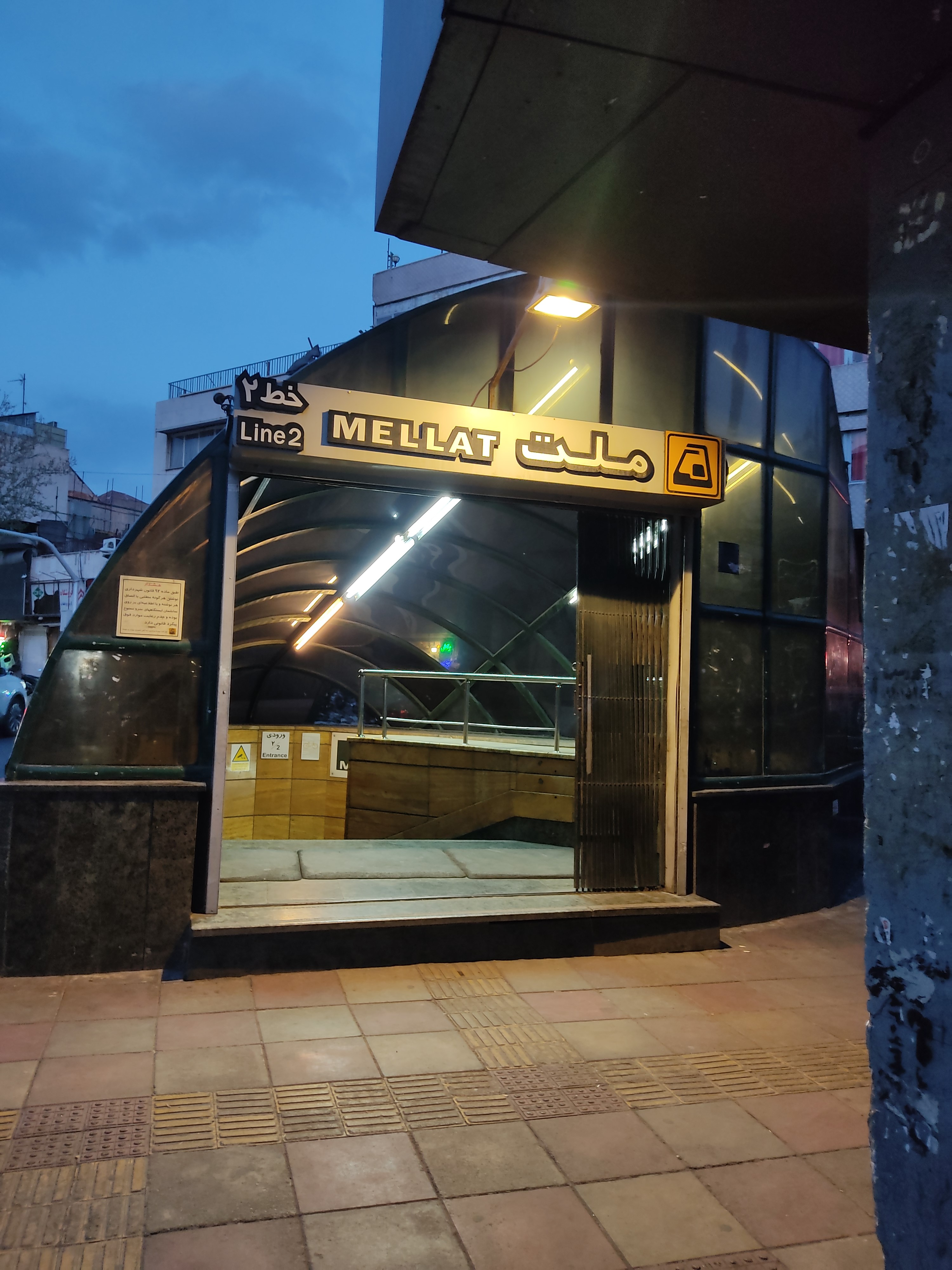

General information
- Location: Ekbatan Street- Mellat Street; District 12, Tehran, Tehran County; Tehran Province, Iran
- Coordinates: 35°41′20″N 51°25′37″E
- System: Tehran Metro Station
- Operator: Tehran Urban and Suburban Railways Organization (Metro)

History
- Opened: 1382 H-Kh (2003)

Services
Preceding station	Tehran Metro	Following station
Imam Khomeini towards Tehran (Sadeghiyeh)	Line 2	Baharestan towards Farhangsara
Location

Mellat Metro Station is a station in Tehran Metro Line 2.

== Location ==
It is located in the junction of Ekbatan Street and Mellat Street. It is between Baharestan Metro Station and Imam Khomeini Metro Station.
