= Janbazan Metro Station =

Station of the Tehran Metro

Janbazan Metro Station ایستگاه مترو جانبازان

General information
- Location: Ayatollah Madani Street; District 8, Tehran, Tehran County; Iran
- Coordinates: 35°43′57″N 51°28′25″E
- System: Tehran Metro Station
- Operator: Tehran Urban and Suburban Railways Organization (Metro)
- Connections: Tehran Buses: 207 Tehranpars Int. - Resalat Sq.; 213 Shahrak-e Mahallati - Resalat Sq.; 312 Qiam Sq. - Resalat Sq.; 362 Resalat Sq. - Pich-e Shemiran; 395 Resalat Sq. - Motahhari St.; 701 Vahidieh St.-Resalat Sq.

History
- Opened: 1385 H-Kh (2006)

Services
Preceding station	Tehran Metro	Following station
Fadak towards Tehran (Sadeghiyeh)	Line 2	Sarsabz towards Farhangsara
Location

Janbazan Metro Station is a station in Tehran Metro Line 2. It is located in the junction of Resalat Expressway and Ayatollah Madani Avenue. It is between Sarsabz Metro Station and Fadak Metro Station.

The station has two elevators and six escalators.

The station was called Golbarg until 2017 when it was renamed to Janbazan.
