= Imam Hossein Metro Station =

Station of the Tehran Metro

Imam Hossein Metro Station ایستگاه مترو امام حسین

General information
- Location: Imam Hossein Square; Districts 7-12, Tehran, Tehran County; Tehran Province, Iran
- Coordinates: 35°42′07″N 51°26′42″E
- System: Tehran Metro Station
- Operator: Tehran Urban and Suburban Railways Organization (Metro)
- Connections: Tehran BRT: BRT 1; Tehran Buses: 211 Baharestan Sq.-Mo'allem St.; 212 Beheshti Term.-Imam Hossein Sq.

History
- Opened: 1385 H-Kh (2006); 1398 H-Kh (28 September 2019)

Services
Preceding station	Tehran Metro	Following station
Darvaze Shemiran towards Tehran (Sadeghiyeh)	Line 2	Shahid Madani towards Farhangsara
Bahar-e Shiraz towards Shahid Arman Aliverdi	Line 6	Meydan-e Shohada towards Dowlat Abad
Location

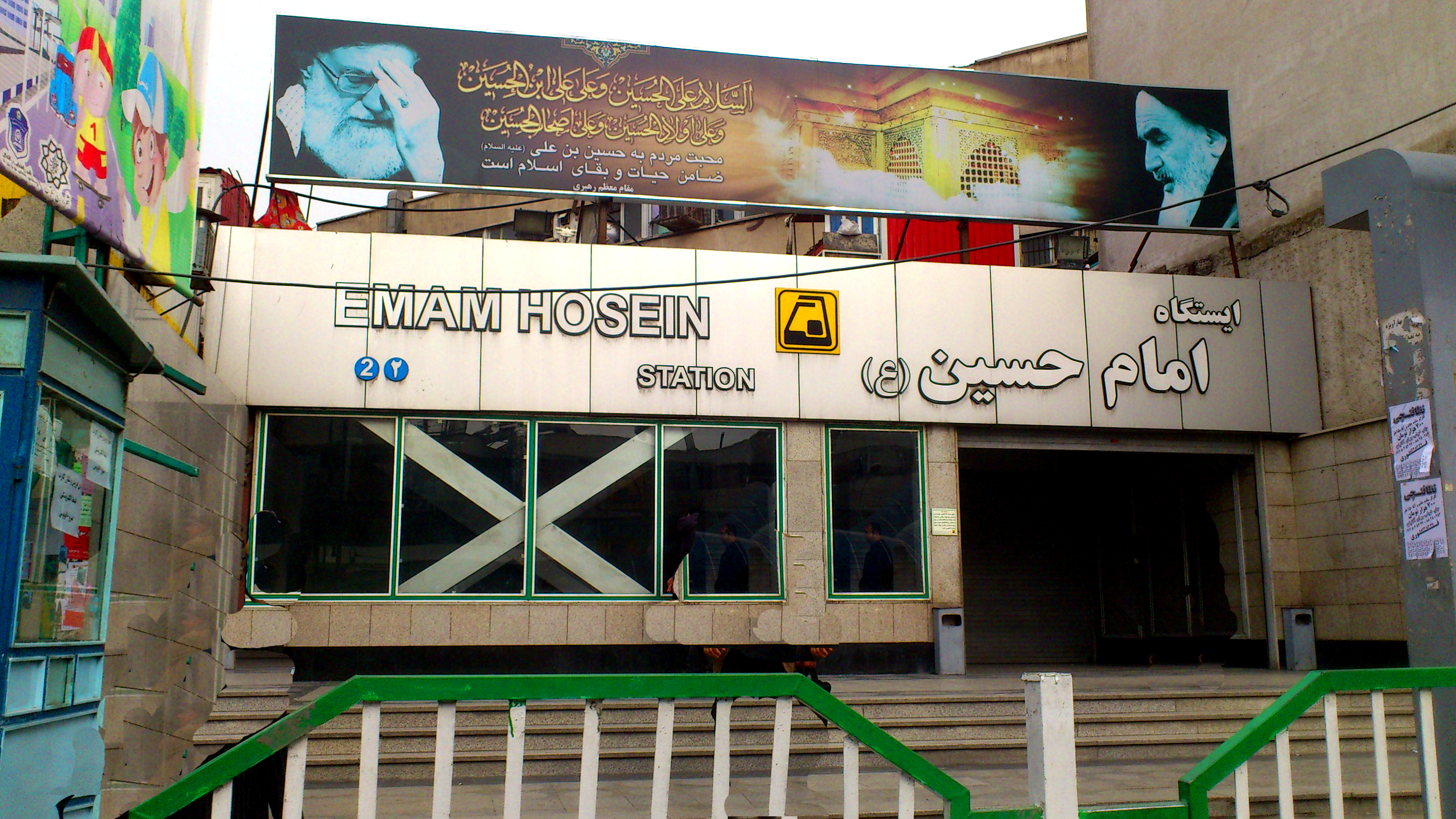
Front of metro station

Imam Hossein Metro Station is a station in Tehran, Metro Line 2. It is located in Imam Hossein Square, the junctions of Ayatollah Madani Avenue and Enghelab Street. It is between Shahid Madani Metro Station and Darvaze Shemiran Metro Station along Line 2. The station is also located along Line 6, north of Meydan-e Shohada Metro Station. This Station is 23 meters underground and it has elevators.
