= Shahid Madani Metro Station =

Station of the Tehran Metro

Shahid Madani Metro Station ایستگاه مترو شهید مدنی
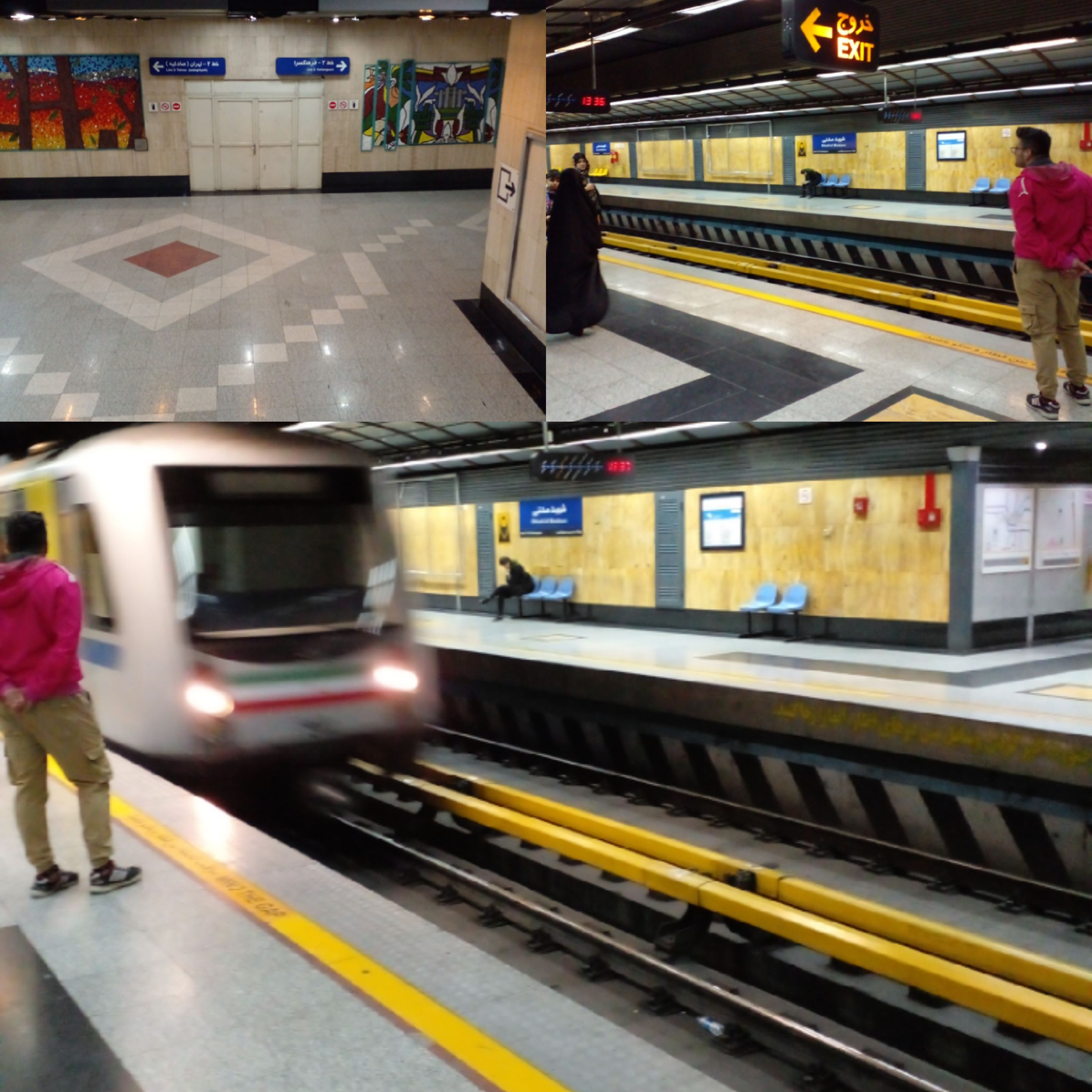

General information
- Location: Ayatollah Madani Street; District 7, Tehran, Tehran County; Iran
- Coordinates: 35°42′33″N 51°27′09″E
- System: Tehran Metro Station
- Operator: Tehran Urban and Suburban Railways Organization (Metro)
- Connections: Tehran Buses: 211 Baharestan Sq.-Mo'allem St.

History
- Opened: 1384 H-Kh (2005)

Services
Preceding station	Tehran Metro	Following station
Imam Hossein towards Tehran (Sadeghiyeh)	Line 2	Sabalan towards Farhangsara
Location

Shahid Madani Metro Station is a station in Tehran Metro Line 2. It is located in Ayatollah Madani Avenue. It is between Sarsabz Metro Station and Imam Hossein Metro Station.
