= Fadak Metro Station =

Station of the Tehran Metro

Fadak Metro Station ایستگاه مترو فدک
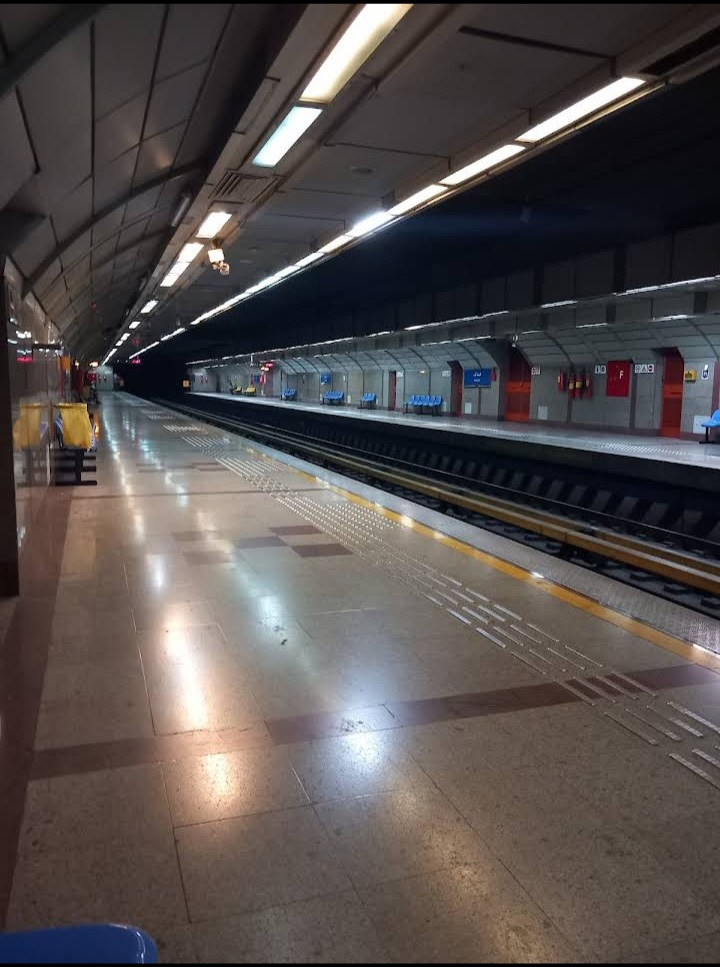
- The intetior of the station

General information
- Location: Ayatollah Madani Street; District 8, Tehran, Tehran County; Iran
- Coordinates: 35°43′35″N 51°28′33″E
- System: Tehran Metro Station
- Operator: Tehran Urban and Suburban Railways Organization (Metro)
- Connections: Tehran Buses: 312 Qiam Sq.-Resalat Sq.

History
- Opened: 1385 H-Kh (2006)

Services
Preceding station	Tehran Metro	Following station
Sabalan towards Tehran (Sadeghiyeh)	Line 2	Janbazan towards Farhangsara
Location

Fadak Metro Station is a station in Tehran Metro Line 2. It is located in Ayatollah Madani Avenue. It is between Janbazan Metro Station and Sabalan Metro Station.
