= Imam Khomeini station =

Station of the Tehran Metro

Emam Khomeini ایستگاه مترو امام خمینی
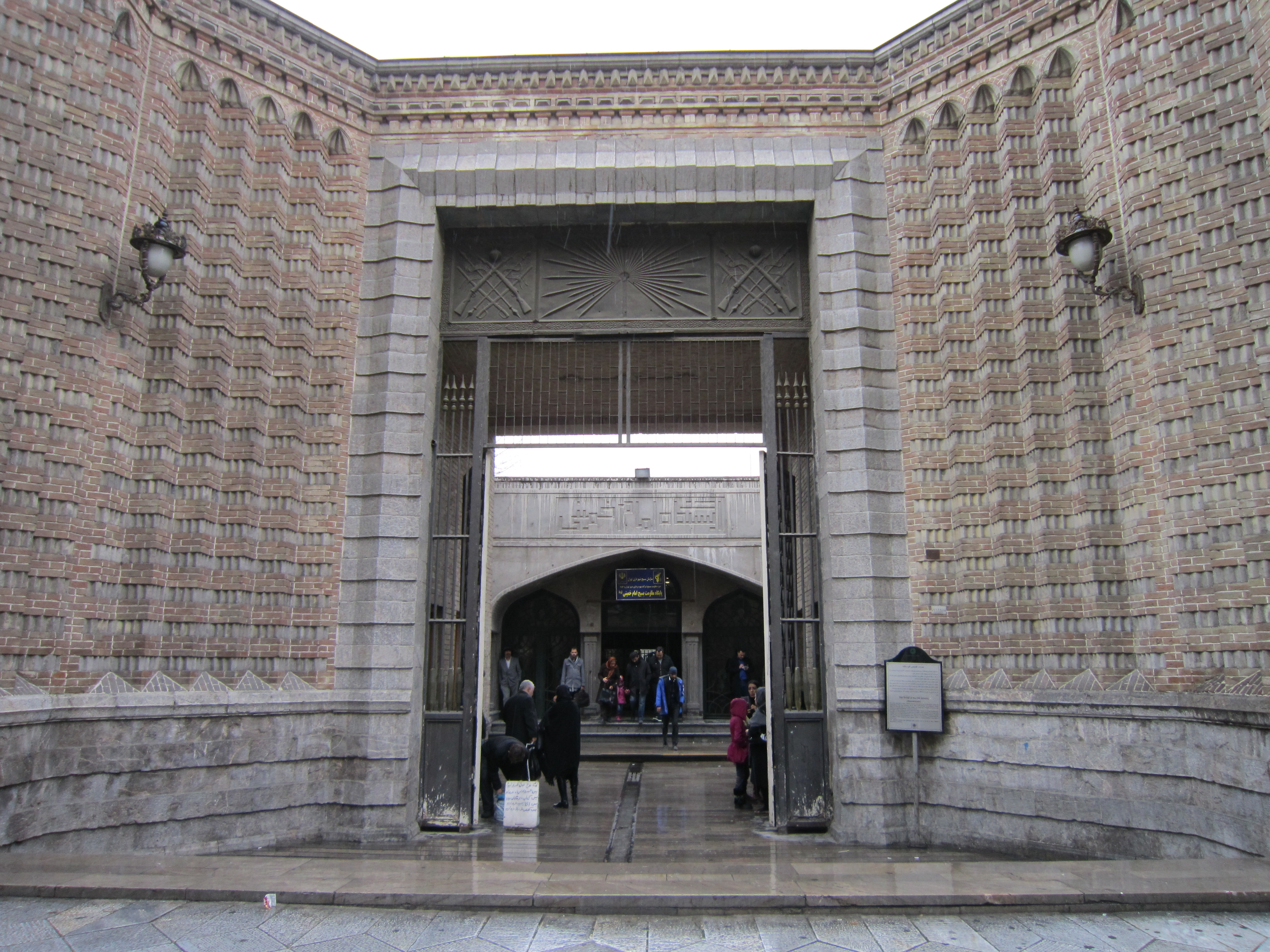

General information
- Location: Toopkhaneh Square; District 12, Tehran, Tehran County; Tehran Province, Iran
- Coordinates: 35°41′09″N 51°25′11″E
- System: Tehran Metro station
- Operator: Tehran Urban and Suburban Railways Organization (Metro)
- Connections: Emam Khomeini Bus Terminal; Fayyazbakhsh Bus Terminal Tehran Buses: 204 South Saadi - Pasdar-e Gomnam; 243 Emam Khomeini Metro-13 Aban; 256 Fayyazbakhsh Term.-17 Shahrivar (Naziabad); 257 Fayyazbakhsh Term.-Abrisham Term.; 258 Fayyazbakhsh Term.-Javadieh; 266 Fayyazbakhsh Term.-Kaveh Term. (Enqelab Sq.); 269 Fayyazbakhsh Term.-Ostad Moein Blvd.; 270 Fayyazbakhsh Term.-Qasrodasht St.; 271 Fayyazbakhsh Term.-Malek-e Astar St.; 304 Emam Khomeini Metro-Seyyed Khandan; 308 Emam Khomeini Metro-Emamat Sq.; 319 South Saadi - South Terminal; 337 Emam Khomeini Metro-Qods Blvd.; 338 Emam Khomeini Metro-Parking Shahr-e Rey; 344 Abuzar Blvd. - Naser Khosrow; 351 Hashemabad - Naser Khosrow; 353 Vali Asr Park - Saadi; 357 Emam Khomeini Metro-Qods Sq.; 358 Beyhaghi Term. - Ferdowsi St.; 359 Rahahan-Haft-e Tir; 364 Fayyazbakhsh Term.-Khaniabad-e Now; 376 Fayyazbakhsh Term.-Shahrak-e Vesal; 381 Emam Khomeini Metro-Mo'allem St.; 403 Fayyazbakhsh Term.-Shamshiri St.; 408 Fayyazhbakhsh Term.-Baharan Sq.; 413 Fayyazbakhsh Term.-Ferdows (Mehrabad); 417 Fayyazbakhsh Term.-Sarvari Term.; 912 Terminal-e Jonub-Ferdowsi Sq.

Construction
- Structure type: Underground
- Depth: 19 metres (62 ft)
- Accessible: yes

History
- Opened: 2 Esfand 1378 H-Kh 21 February 2000; 6 Shahrivar 1380 H-Kh 28 August 2001

Services
Preceding station	Tehran Metro	Following station
Saadi towards Tajrish	Line 1	Panzdah-e-Khordad towards Kahrizak
Hasan Abad towards Tehran (Sadeghiyeh)	Line 2	Mellat towards Farhangsara
Location

The Emam Khomeini Metro Station is the junction of Tehran Metro Line 1 and Line 2. The station was opened on 21 February 2000. It is located in Toopkhaneh Square between Panzdah-e-Khordad Metro Station and Saadi Metro Station in Line 1 and Mellat Metro Station and Hasan Abad Metro Station in Line 2.

This station is 19 meters underground and has elevator access.
