= Sabalan Metro Station =

Station of the Tehran Metro

Sabalan Metro Station ایستگاه مترو سبلان

General information
- Location: Ayatollah Madani Street- Sabalan Street; Districts 7-8, Tehran, Tehran County; Iran
- Coordinates: 35°43′05″N 51°27′52″E
- System: Tehran Metro Station
- Operator: Tehran Urban and Suburban Railways Organization (Metro)
- Connections: Tehran BRT: BRT 9 (180 m away); Tehran Buses: 211 Baharestan Sq.-Mo'allem St.; 212 Beheshti Term.-Imam Hossein Sq.; 312 Qiam Sq.-Resalat Sq.

History
- Opened: 1385 H-Kh (2006)

Services
Preceding station	Tehran Metro	Following station
Shahid Madani towards Tehran (Sadeghiyeh)	Line 2	Fadak towards Farhangsara
Location

Sabalan Metro Station is a station in Tehran Metro Line 2. It is located in the junction of Ayatollah Madani Avenue and Sabalan Street. It is between Fadak Metro Station and Shahid Madani Metro Station.
