= Elm-o-Sanat University Metro Station =

Station of the Tehran Metro

Daneshgah-e Elm-o San'at Metro Station ایستگاه مترو دانشگاه علم و صنعت
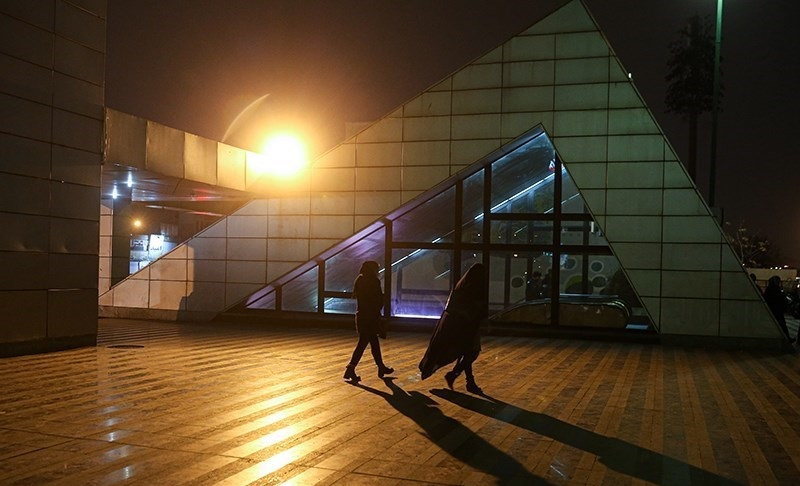

General information
- Location: Resalat Expressway; Districts 4-8, Tehran, Tehran County; Iran
- Coordinates: 35.7345°N 51.5048°E
- System: Tehran Metro Station
- Operator: Tehran Urban and Suburban Railways Organization (Metro)
- Connections: Elm-o San'at Terminal Tehran BRT: BRT 3; BRT 5; Tehran Buses: 206 Shahid Barari Term. - Elm-o San'at Term.; 208 Khaghani Bridge - Seraj; 216 Shahrak-e Mahallati - Elm-o San'at Term.; 224 Ofogh Blvd. - Elm-o San'at Term.; 382 Zeyn od-Din Exp -Elm-o San'at Term.; 399 Elm-o San'at Term. - Shahrak-e Beheshti; 401 Imam Hossein University - Elm-o San'at Term.

History
- Opened: 1384 H-Kh (2005)

Services
Preceding station	Tehran Metro	Following station
Sarsabz towards Tehran (Sadeghiyeh)	Line 2	Shahid Bagheri towards Farhangsara
Location

Elm-o-Sanat University Metro Station transcribed officially as Daneshgah-e Elm-o San'at Metro Station is a station in Tehran Metro Line 2. It is located in the junction of Resalat Expressway and Dordasht Street. It is near Iran University of Science and Technology. It is between Shahid Bagheri Metro Station and Sarsabz Metro Station.

This station has seven escalators and three elevators.
