= Tehranpars Metro Station =

Station of the Tehran Metro

Tehranpars Metro Station ایستگاه مترو تهرانپارس
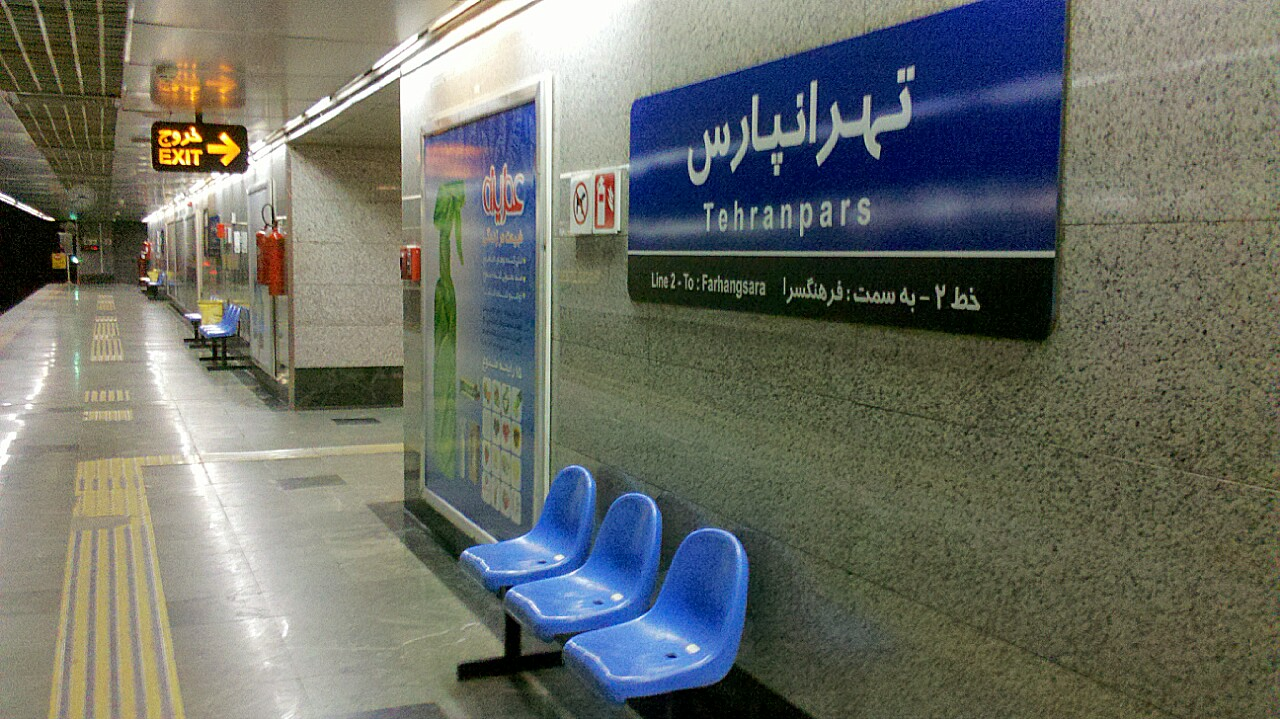

General information
- Location: Resalat Expressway; Districts 4-8, Tehran, Tehran County; Tehran Province, Iran
- Coordinates: 35.7309°N 51.5318°E
- System: Tehran Metro Station
- Operator: Tehran Urban and Suburban Railways Organization (Metro)
- Connections: Tehran Buses: 402 Tehranpars Int.-Shahrak-e Pars

Construction
- Structure type: Underground
- Depth: 12 m (39 ft)

History
- Opened: 1387 H-Kh (2008)

Services
Preceding station	Tehran Metro	Following station
Shahid Bagheri towards Tehran (Sadeghiyeh)	Line 2	Farhangsara Terminus
Location

Tehranpars Metro Station is the eastern end of Tehran Metro Line 2, in Iran. It is located in the junction of Resalat Expressway and Hojar-ibn Ady. It is between Farhangsara Metro Station and Shahid Bagheri Metro Station.

This station has six escalators and two elevators.
