= Sarsabz =

Place in Tehran

Sarsabz is the name of a region in a Narmak of Tehran, Iran, near HaftHoz.
