= Dardasht =

Dardasht (Persian: دردشت) may refer to:

- Dardasht (Tehran)
- Dardasht (Isfahan)
