= Sarsabz Metro Station =

Station of the Tehran Metro

Sarsabz Metro Station ایستگاه مترو سرسبز
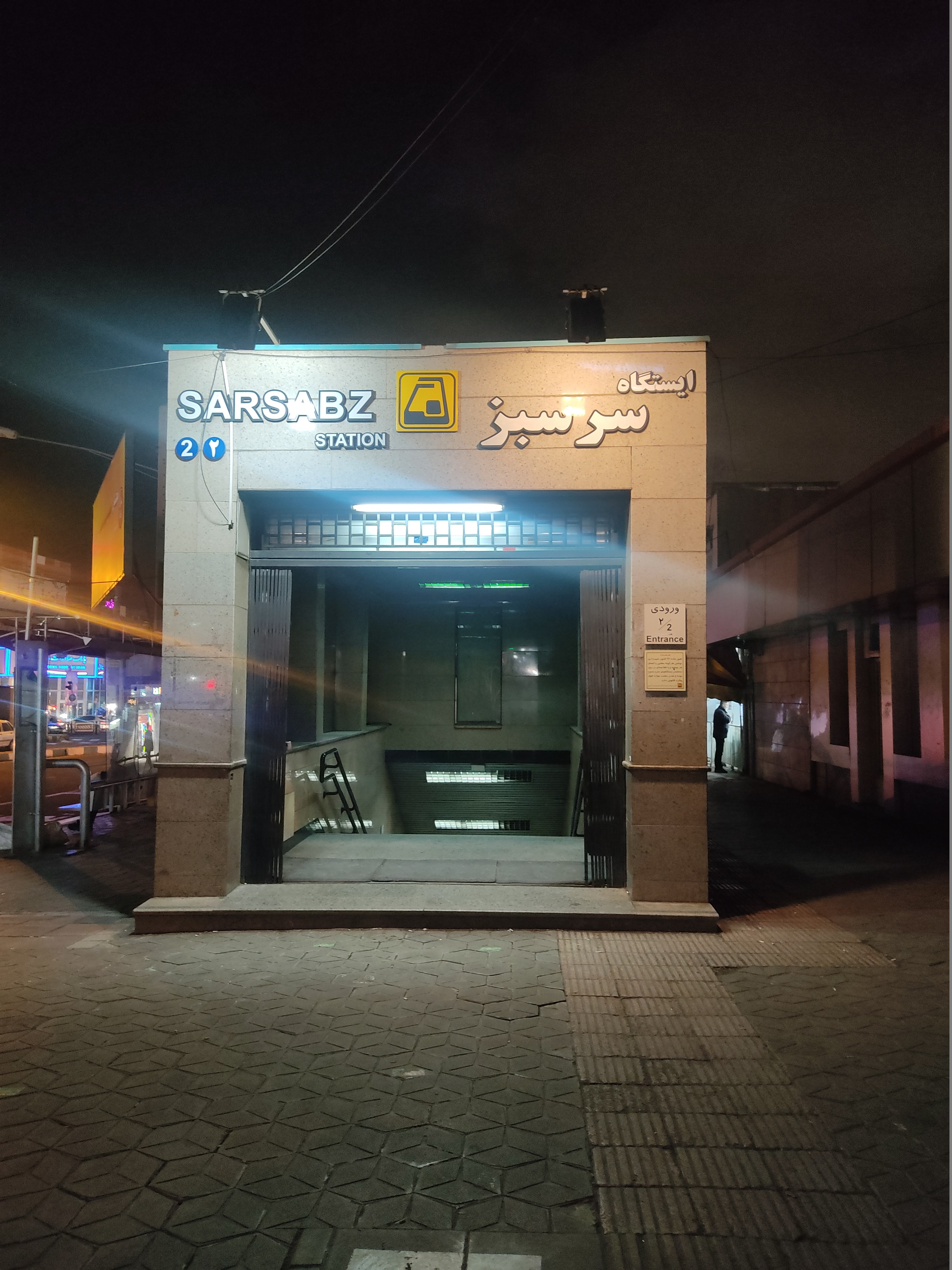

General information
- Location: Resalat Expressway; Districts 4-8, Tehran, Tehran County; Iran
- Coordinates: 35°44′06″N 51°29′42″E
- System: Tehran Metro Station
- Operator: Tehran Urban and Suburban Railways Organization (Metro)
- Bus routes: Line 3
- Connections: Tehran BRT: BRT 3; BRT 5; Tehran Buses: 208 Khaghani Bridge - Seraj; 222 Resalat Sq. - Kuhak; 383 Zeyn od-Din - Resalat Sq.

History
- Opened: 1384 H-Kh (2005)

Services
| Preceding station | Tehran Metro | Following station |
|---|---|---|
| Janbazan towards Tehran (Sadeghiyeh) | Line 2 | Elm-o-Sanat University towards Farhangsara |
Location

Sarsabz Metro Station is a station in Tehran Metro Line 2. It is located near Resalat Square. It is between Elm-o-Sanat University Metro Station and Janbazan Metro Station.
