= Tehran Monorail =

The Tehran Monorail was a project to construct a monorail in the Iranian capital Tehran. The project was cancelled in April 2010, with only 3% completed.

== History and Controversy ==
The concept of constructing a monorail in Iran was first proposed in 1976 before the Iranian Revolution. The then-mayor of Tehran, Javad Shahrestani, eventually scrapped the project after repeated specialist consultations indicated that a monorail network would not ease traffic in the city in a significant fashion. At the time, the general conclusion was that it would create more problems than solutions.

In 2002, Tehran Mayor Mahmoud Ahmadinejad declared his intent to develop a monorail system for the capital, despite numerous warnings by transport and traffic experts. The monorail project was expected to cost 135 million Euros for 12 km and three stations.

The largest criticism of the project lay in its heavy costs on the already cash-strapped Tehran Municipality. Furthermore, a large part of criticism is directed towards the plan's geographical mapping. According to those who have had access to the initial plans, the selected route is less dense then originally intended, making the project, in their view, unjustifiable. Among the opponents of the Monorail plan was Ali-Asghar Ardakanian, a member of the Iranian Association of Rail Transport Engineering, who believed that Iran lacked the pre-requisite skills and knowledge to run and maintain the system. Ardakanian also insisted that the government plan was poorly thought out and failed to take into account the affiliated expenses for maintaining the monorail's underground and surface structures — thus creating funding problems for the future. Additionally, relative to cost, critics point out that the passenger capacity of the monorail is 10 times less than the Tehran Metro.

Supporters of the Tehran Monorail were commonly heard declaring that the development of the project would be significantly faster than other transport project due to its nature.

Despite the overwhelming criticism of the Monorail, a project to build the first phase officially began on March 17, 2004. Phase One comprises a 6 km line with six stations. Sadeghieh Square, Tehran Metro (Green line), Apadana Complex, the Tehran West Bus Depot, Azadi Square, and Mehrabad Airport. Phase Two will include a loop back to Sadeghieh through the Akbatan Apartment complex, and expand the line's length to 12 km.

In 2004, when the project was started by the then-Mayor Ahmadinejad, it had not received the approval of the High Traffic Council; a body in charge of studying and approving transport schemes. This resulted in the monorail being blocked from receiving from any state assistance. In 2007 federal budget, the sum of 82 billion rials was earmarked for the completion for the Monorail by president Mahmoud Ahmadinejad's administration. The Monorail is not supported by the Tehran mayor, Mohammad Bagher Ghalibaf, and the current head of Tehran Metro (TUSRC), Mr. Hashemi, who have asked for the budget allocated to the Monorail to be redistributed for other public transport projects, such as expansion of Metro lines.

In September 2007, Iran Daily reported that the Tehran monorail project will become operational by 2011. This was quoted by the Deputy Interior Minister for development affairs, Mehdi Hashemi. It further added that the monorail lines would extend across the capital, the Persian daily ’Iran’ reported. He continued that the routes for monorail lines in the metropolis have been specified as follows: from Basij Square in the southeast to Tehran Pars in the northeast, from Tehran Pars to Pounak Square in the northwest, from Pounak to Nematabad in the south and from Nematabad to Basij Square again.

== See also ==
- Tehran
- Tehran Metro
- List of monorails
