= Aryashahr =

Aryashahr may refer to:

- Fuladshahr, a city in the Fuladshaht District of Lenjan County, Isfahan Province, Iran, formerly known as Aryashahr
- Aryashahr, also known as Sadeghiyeh, a populated district located in west of Tehran, Iran
