= HaftHoz =

Square in Tehran, Iran

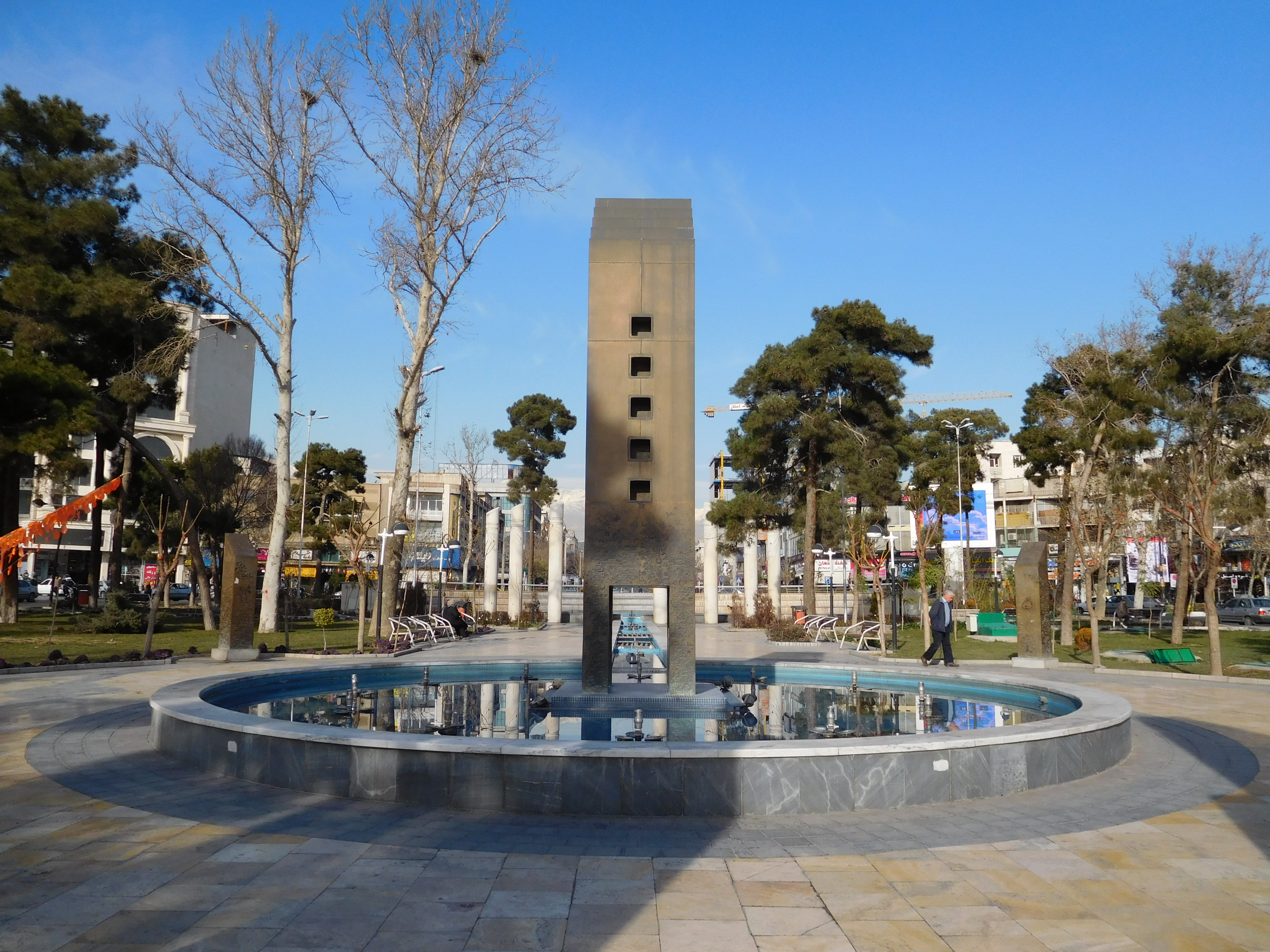
HaftHoz Square, 2016

HaftHoz (Nabovat) square is a shopping center square located in Narmak neighbourhood of Tehran, Iran.

HaftHoz is also the name of a place located in Darakeh, along the path of Palangchal.

It is also the name of the adjacent neighborhood (mahle), in the second region of the 8th district of Tehran.
