= Sadeghiyeh =

Sadeghiyeh صادقیه Aria Shahr
- Neighborhood
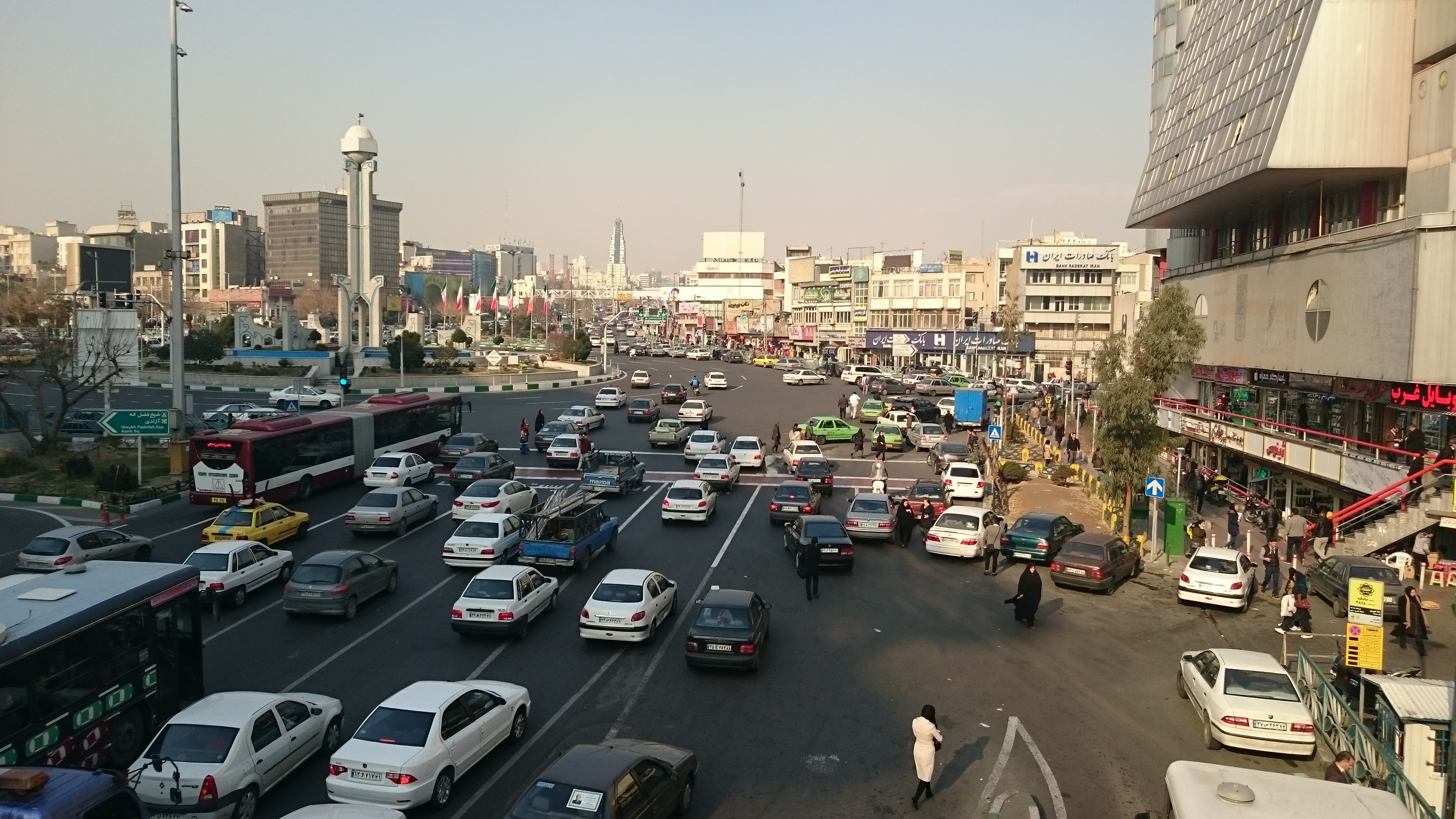

- Location in Tehran Location in Iran
- Country: Iran
- Province: Tehran
- City: Tehran
- District: Districts 2 and 5
- Time zone: UTC+3:30 (IRST)
  - Summer (DST): UTC+4:30 (IRDT)

Sadeghiyeh (also Sadeghieh, Sadeqiyeh) (Persian: صادقیه) is a heavily populated district in the West of Tehran, Iran. Also known as Ariashahr (also Aryashahr) (Persian: آریاشهر), it is one of Tehran's busiest commercial and residential centers.

The Sadighiyeh metro station is one of the busiest stations in Tehran where Tehran Metro lines 2 and 5 (Karaj Intercity Train) intersect.

Sadighiyeh has two main squares called First Sadighiyeh Square and Second Sadighiyeh Square.
