= Dardasht (Tehran) =

Coordinates: 35°43′27″N 51°30′7″E

Dardasht (Persian: دردشت) is an eastern neighbourhood of Tehran, Iran. Dardasht is situated near the large Tehranpars quarter. It is also the name of the Tehran Metro station which is the starting point of Tehran Metro's line 2. The Iran University of Science and Technology is also situated near the Dardasht station.
