= Qasem Soleimani Expressway =

Expressway in Tehran, Iran

Qasem Soleimani Expressway
- بزرگراه شهید سردار قاسم سلیمانی
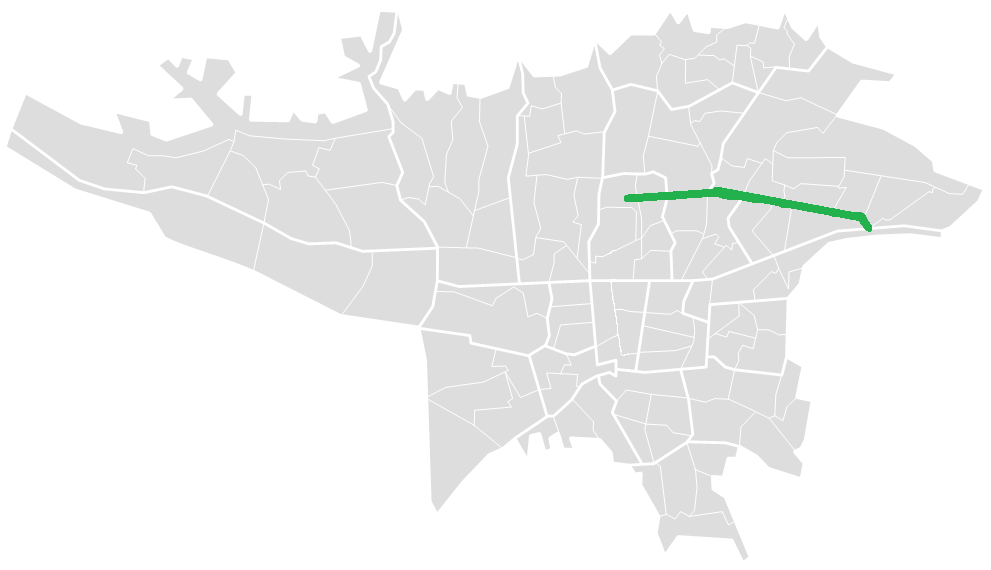

Route information
- Length: 12 km (7.5 mi)

Major junctions
- East end: Yasini Expressway
- West end: Hakim Expressway; Kordestan Expressway

Location
- Country: Iran
- Major cities: Tehran

Highway system
- Highways in Iran; Freeways

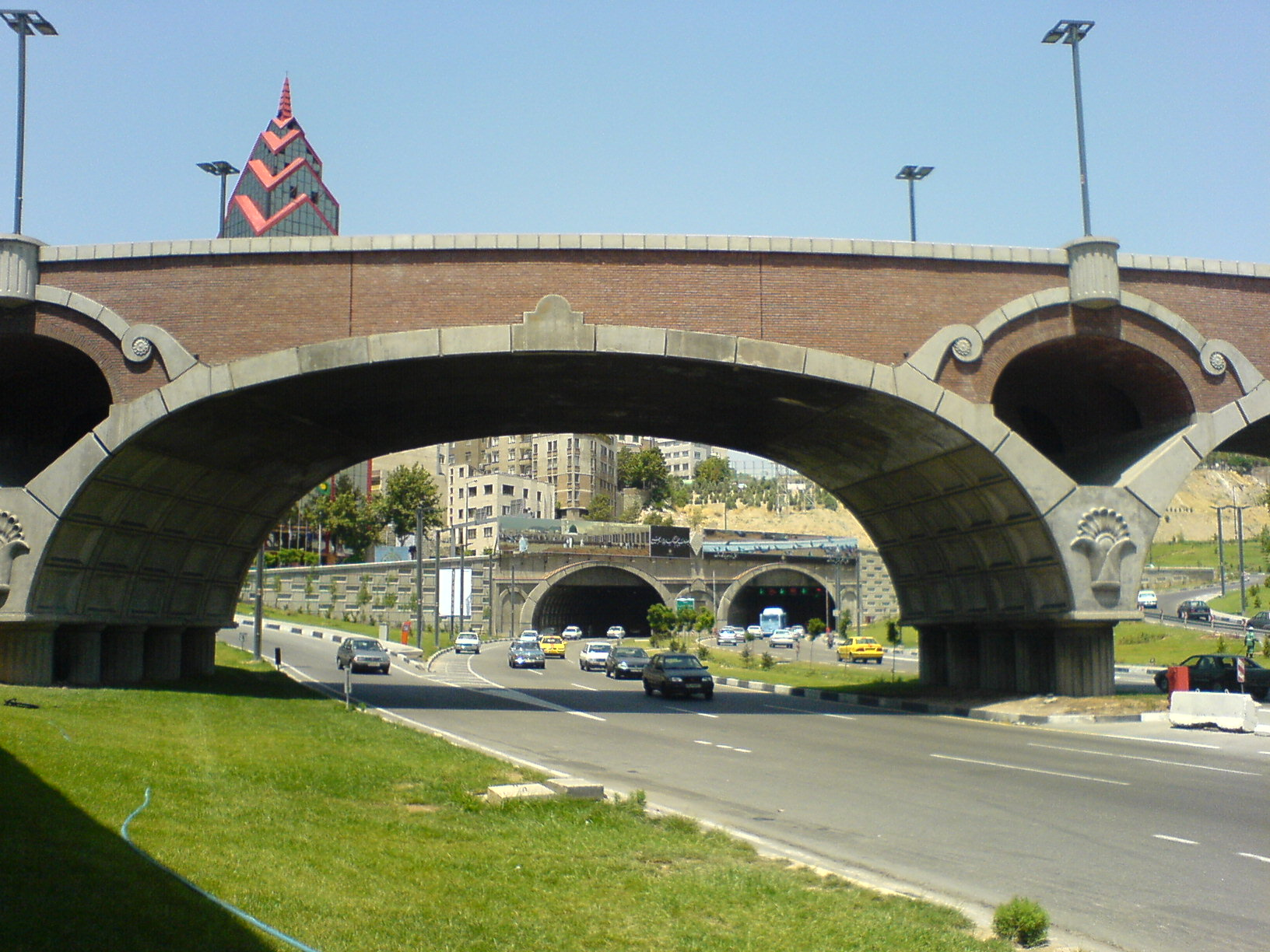
Qasem Soleimani Expressway junction with Africa Boulevard and entrance of Resalat Tunnel.

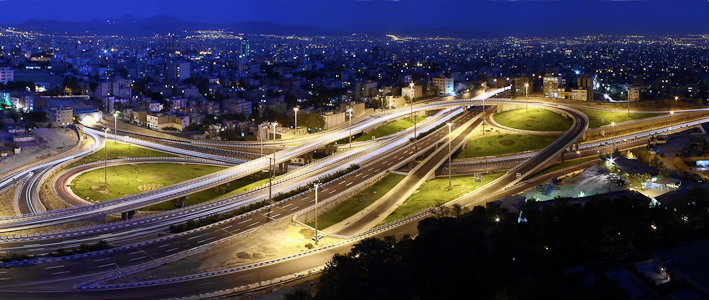
Kordestan Expressway interchange with Qasem Soleimani Expressway and Hakim Expressway.

Lieutenant General Qasem Soleimani Expressway, formerly called Resalat Expressway, is an east-west expressway in Tehran, Iran.

It joins the eastern localities of Tehran metropolis, including Resalat District, to Seyed Khandan in north-central Tehran and further to western parts of the Greater Tehran.

The Resalat Tunnel was opened by Mahmoud Ahmadinejad with newlyweds being the first to drive through it. Upon praying in the tunnel at its re-opening, Rageh Omaar of the BBC prayed on the same prayer mat as Ahmadinejad at the same time.

The expressway was renamed to Shahid Sardar Qasem Soleimani Expressway, following the Assassination of Qasem Soleimani by an American airstrike.

From East to West
	Yasini Expressway
	Damavand Street
	Parvin Boulevard
Tehranpars Metro Station
	Tehranpars Expressway
Shahid Bagheri Metro Station
Elm-o-Sanat University Metro Station
	Ayat Street
Sarsabz Metro Station
Resalat Square	Hengam Street; Ayatollah Madani Boulevard
Golbarg Metro Station
	Imam Ali Expressway
Shahid Sayyad Shirazi Interchange	Niavaran Expressway
	Shariati Street
	Sohravardi Street
	Shahid Haghani Expressway
Mosalla Metro Station
	Modares Expressway
Africa Square	Africa Boulevard
Resalat Tunnel
	Kordestan Expressway
Continues as Hakim Expressway
From West to East
