= Tehran Metro Line 2 =

Metro line in Tehran, Iran

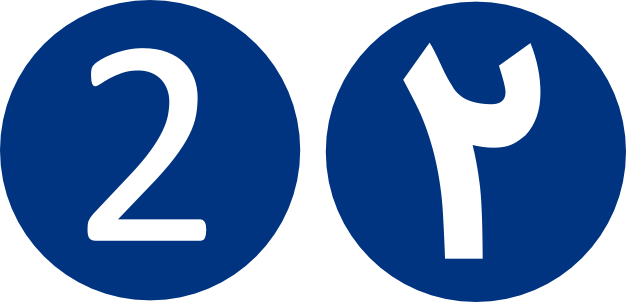

Overview
- Native name: خط ۲ مترو تهران
- Owner: Tehran Urban and Suburban Railways Organization (Metro)
- Line number: 15
- Locale: Tehran, Tehran Province
- Termini: Tehran (Sadeqiyeh) Station; Farhangsara Station
- Stations: 22

Service
- Type: Rapid transit
- System: Tehran Metro
- Operator(s): Tehran Urban and Suburban Railways Organization (Metro)
- Depot(s): Tehran-East Depot; Tehran-West Depot

History
- Opened: 21 February 2000; 26 years ago
- Last extension: 6 October 2010; 15 years ago

Technical
- Line length: 26 km (16 mi)
- Number of tracks: 2
- Track gauge: 1,435 mm (4 ft 8 1/2 in)
- Electrification: Third rail
Route map
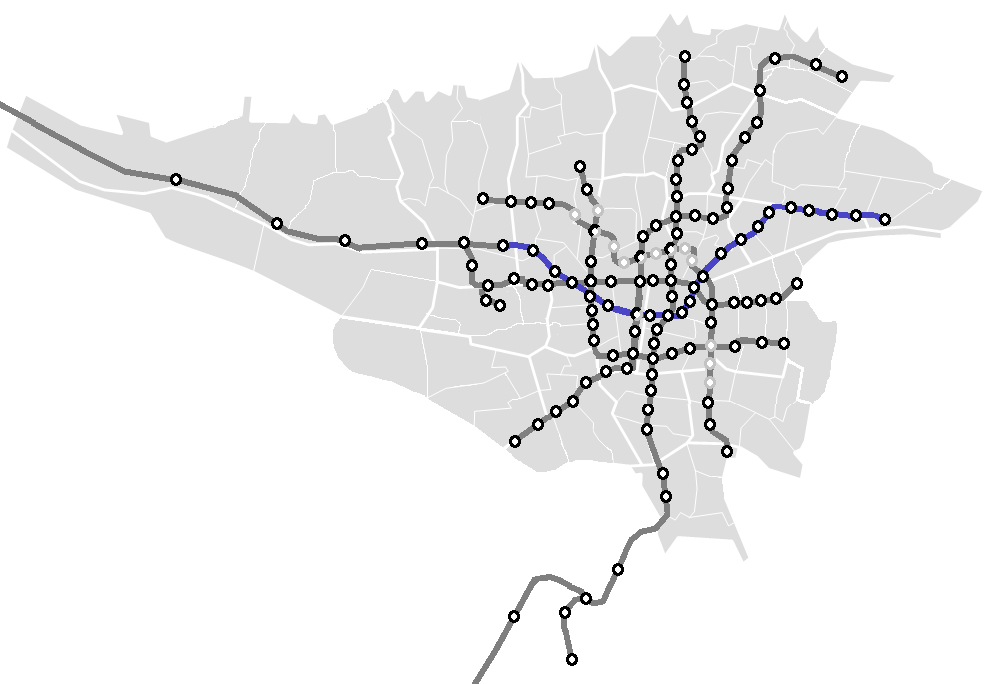

Tehran Metro Line 2, which opened between Sadeghieh and Imam Khomeini in February 2000, is 26 kilometers (16 mi) long, with 23.6 km (14.7 mi) as a subway and 2.4 kilometers (1.5 mi) elevated. At this time, there were 19 stations along the line, of which Imam Khomeini Station was shared by Line 1. Line 2 is coloured blue on system maps and runs mostly east–west through the city.

The line was extended from Imam-Khomeini to Baharestan Metro Station in 2004, and to Shahid Madani, Sarsabz and Elm-o-Sanat University in March 2006 with the intermediate stations, Darvazeh Shemiran and Sabalan, opening in July 2006. It was extended further from Elm-o-Sanat University to Tehran Pars in February 2009, and to Farhangsara in June 2010. The extension phase to new east terminal is under construction.

This line, plus Line 4 are the only lines to intersect with every single one of the other four operational lines. This line also serves three universities across the city: Sharif University of Technology, Imam Ali University for Army Officers, and Iran University of Science and Technology.

== Route ==
The line starts at western Tehran, north of Tehran-Karaj Freeway, going southeast along Teymuri Street, intersecting line 4 at Shademan Station on Azadi Street. It keeps going southeast along Azarbaijan Street. It then turns east and runs along Emam Khomeini Street until it reaches Toopkhaneh, intersecting with line 1 at Imam Khomeini station. It then turns northwest, passing line 4 again at Darvazeh Shemiran, and Imam Hossein Square. It then goes along Ayatollah Madani Street for 5.5 km (3.4 mi), until reaching Resalat Expressway, where it turns east again. It goes eastwards for another 5.7 km (3.5 mi), until reaching Farhangsara station.

== Future ==
A 4.5 km (2.8 mi) long extension going eastwards from Farhangsara station is proposed. The proposed line would reach Tehran Eastern Bus Terminal. It may also be continued towards the city of Pardis.
