= Tehran Metro =

Rapid transit system of Tehran, Iran

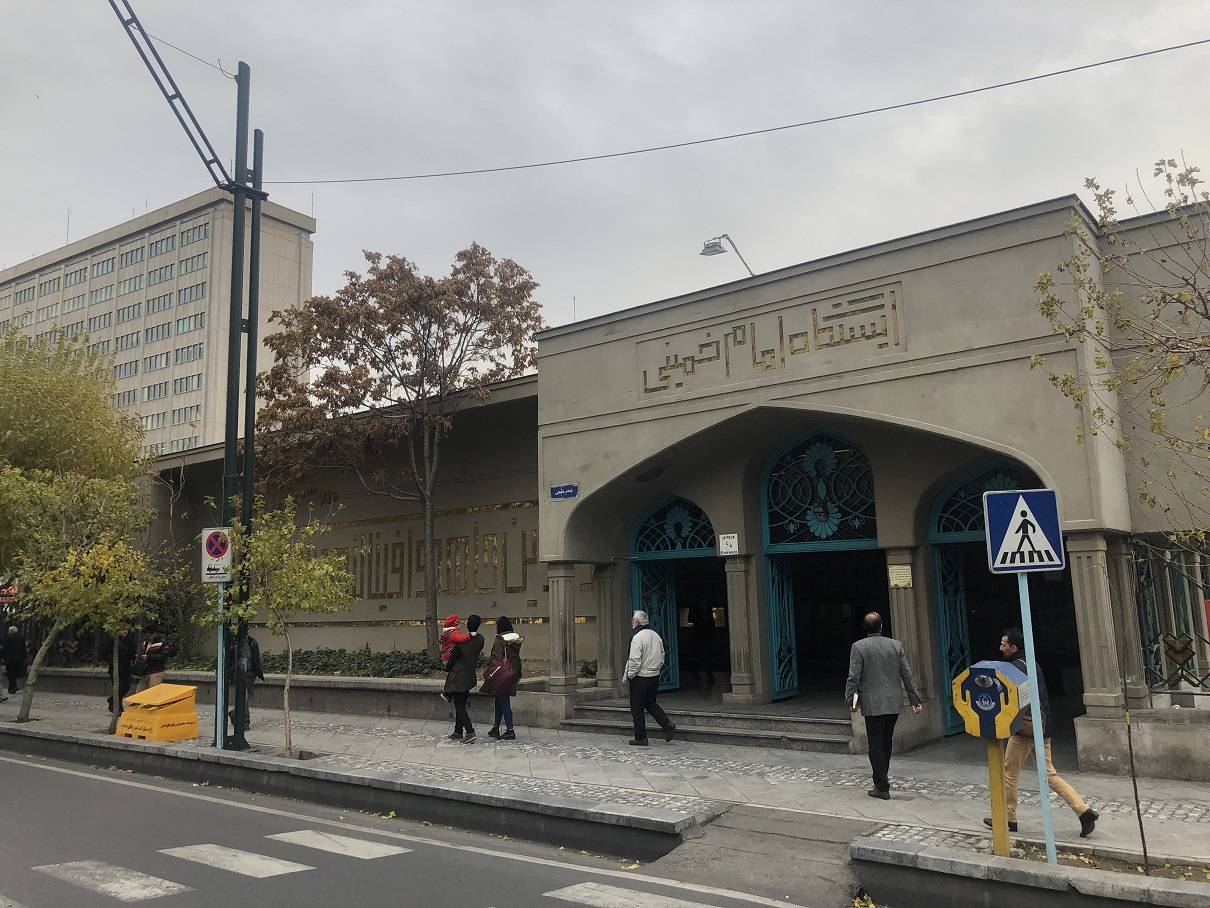

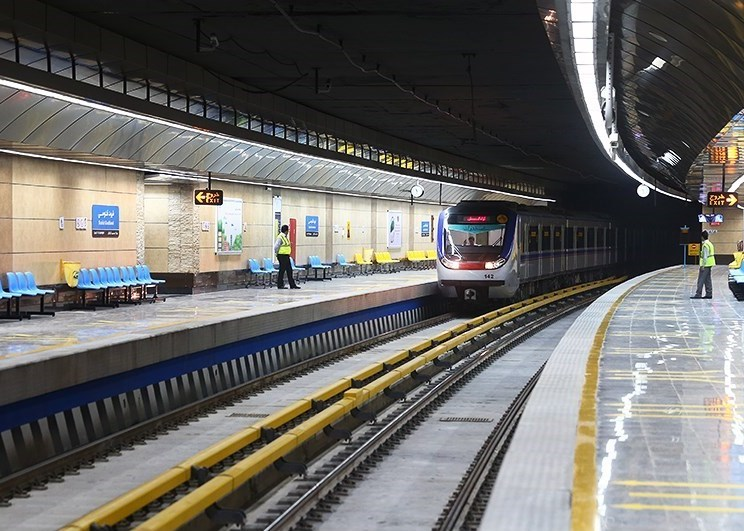
- Top: Outside view of Imam Khomeini station Bottom: A train at the Ghoddoosi Metro Station

Overview
- Native name: متروی تهران
- Locale: Tehran, Iran
- Transit type: Rapid transit/metro (Lines 1–4, 6–7); Commuter rail (Lines 5 and 1)
- Number of lines: 7 active lines
- Number of stations: 163 (total)
- Daily ridership: 2.5 million
- Annual ridership: 820 million (2018)
- Website: metro.tehran.ir

Operation
- Began operation: 7 March 1999; 27 years ago
- Operators: Tehran Urban and Suburban Railway Company (TUSRC)
- Number of vehicles: 1,514

Technical
- System length: 310 km (190 mi) (total)
- Track gauge: 1,435 mm (4 ft 8 1/2 in) standard gauge

Tehran Metro (Persian: متروی تهران, romanized: Metro-ye Tehrān) is a rapid transit system serving Tehran, the capital of Iran. It is the largest metro system in the Middle East. The system is owned and operated by Tehran Urban and Suburban Railway. It consists of six operational metro lines (and an additional commuter rail line), with construction under way on seven lines including northwestern extension of line 4, southeastern extension line 6, northwestern extension line 7, east extension line 2 and Line 10, Line 8, Line 9 and 11.

The Tehran Metro carries more than 3 million passengers a day. In 2018, 820 million trips were made on Tehran Metro. As of 2023, the total system is 310 kilometers (190 mi) long. It is planned to have a length of 500 kilometers (310 mi) with 330 stations in eleven lines once all construction is complete by 2040.

On all days of the week, the Metro service runs from 05:30 to 22:00.

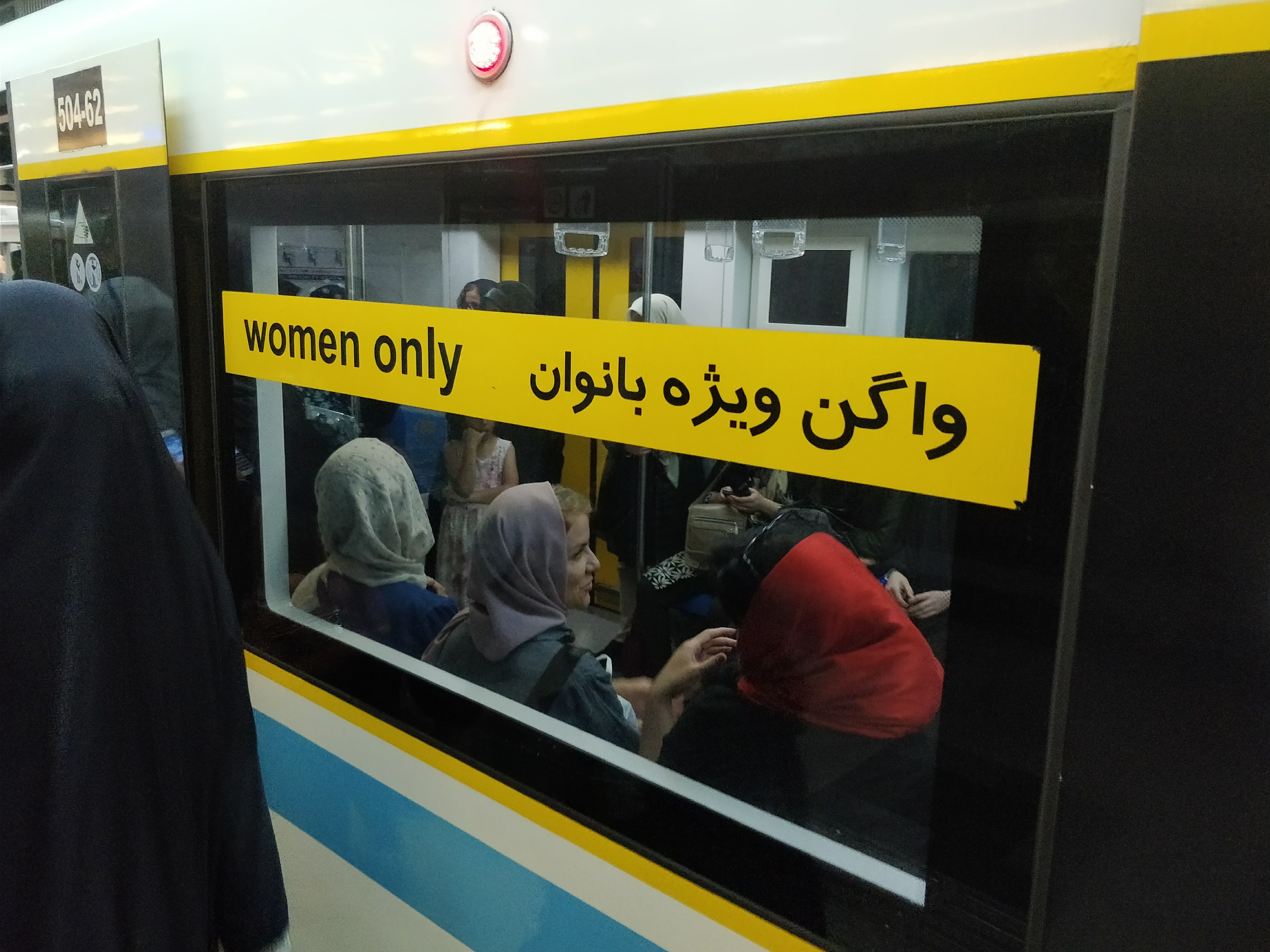
Women-only section

The line uses standard gauge and is mostly underground. Ticket price is 5,300 Iranian Toman for each journey (about US$0.05), regardless of the distance travelled, but using prepaid tickets costs much less. Seniors may travel for free on the metro. On all Tehran metro trains the first and half of the second carriages from each end are reserved for women. Women can still ride other cars freely.

== History ==
During the Qajar era in the late 19th century, an extensive tram network was constructed in Tehran, the Iranian capital's first attempt at a public transit system. However, the tram network was decommissioned during the reign of Reza Shah in the 1930s, without an immediate replacement. This mirrored global trends at the time, to shift attention away from collective public transit systems towards individualist car dependency.

In the 1960s, debate about a need for a public transport system in the city rose to prominence again, with the city's leading newspaper Ayandegan stating in an editorial that "Tehran has no strength left and resembles a patient on the verge of death. ... Within ten years, Tehran will not be able to function without a metro". As a response to this renewed public demand, government plans for the metro system in Tehran were drawn up in the late 1960s but could not be executed until 1982 because of socio-political issues such as the Iranian Revolution and the Iran–Iraq War.

In 1970, the Plan and Budget Organisation and the Municipality of Tehran announced an international tender for construction of a metro in Tehran. The French company SOFRETU, affiliated with the state-owned Paris transportation authority RATP, won the tender and in the same year began to conduct preliminary studies on the project. In 1974, a final report with a so-called "street-metro" proposal was tendered. The street-metro system recommended a road network with a loop express way in the central area and two highways for new urban areas and an 8-line metro network which were complemented by bus network and taxi services.

Geological surveys commenced in 1976. In 1978, construction on the line was started in northern Tehran by the French company, however this development was short-lived with the advent of the Iranian Revolution and the Iran–Iraq War in 1979 and 1980 respectively. SOFRETU ceased operations in Iran in December 1980. On 3 March 1982, the Iranian Cabinet ministers formally announced the stop of Tehran Metro operations by the French company.

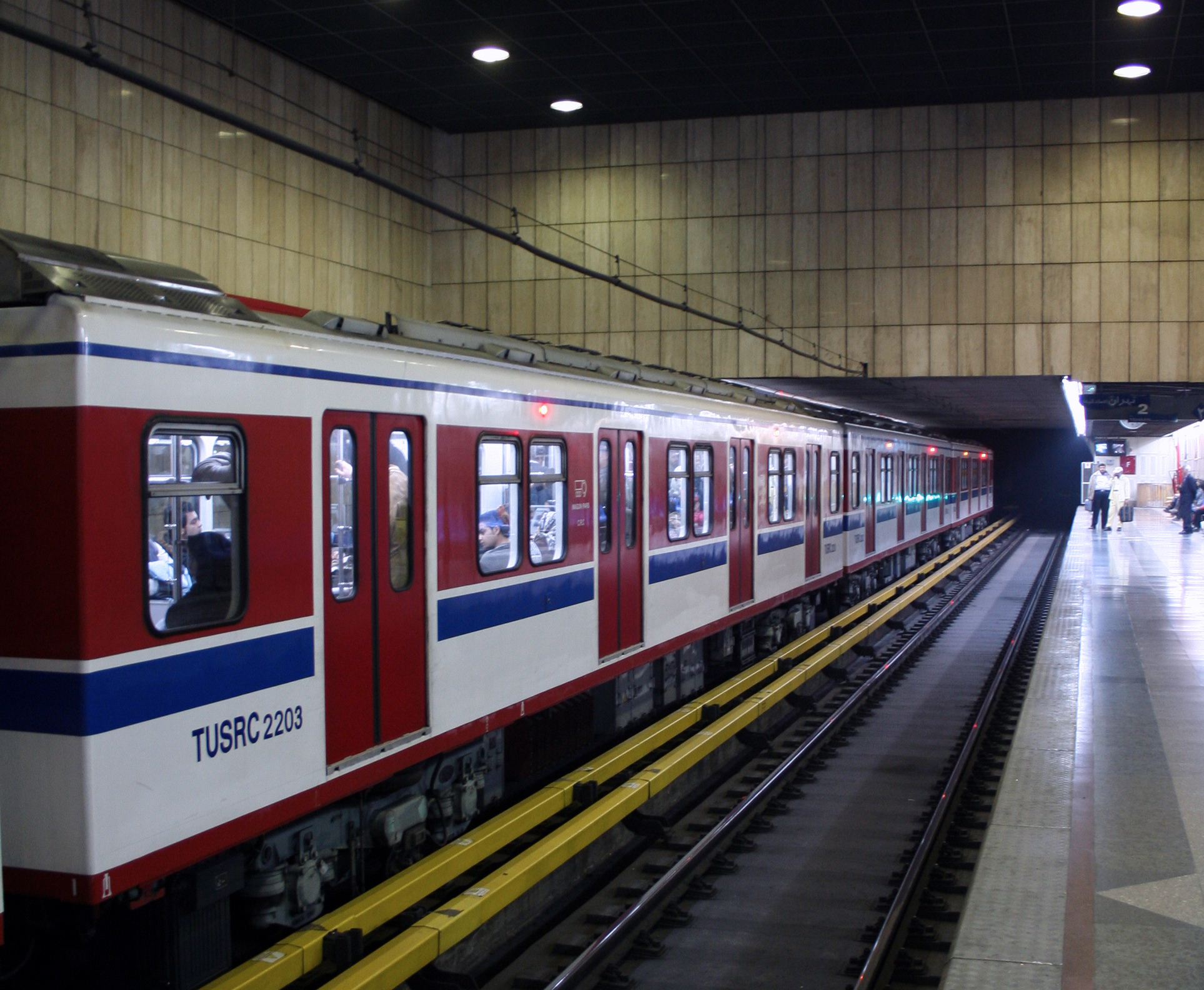
CRV Type DKZ3 Cars in the Tehran Metro

In 1985, the "Tehran Metro Execution Plan" was re-approved by the Majles, the Iranian Parliament, on the basis of legal project of "Amendment of Law of Establishment of Tehran Urban and suburban Railway Company" which had been founded in Farvardin 1364 (April 1985). This was a literal continuation of exactly the same project that had been laid out before the revolution. Work proceeded slowly because of the continuing Iran–Iraq War and often ground to a halt.

By the summer of 1985, urban pressure from the rapidly urbanising population, and lack of developed public transport system prompted the work to be resumed in earnest. "Line 1" (From Blvd. Shahid Ayatollah Haghani to Rey) and its extension to Behesht-e Zahra Cemetery was made a priority. "Line 2" (From Dardasht in Tehran Pars district to Sadeghiyeh Second Square) and an extending towards Karaj and Mehrshahr district was also made a secondary priority. Studies were also made to establish the previously designed Lines 3 & 4. It was decided that an organisation by the name of the Metro Company should be established in order to handle the future development of the system.

The Metro Company then became managed by Asghar Ebrahimi Asl for eleven years. During that time, hundreds of millions of dollars were spent on the system and the Metro Company was given government concessions for the exploitation of iron ore mines in Bandar Abbas (Hormuzgan Province), exploitation and sale of Moghan Diotomite mine in Iranian Azarbaijan, export of refinery residues from Isfahan oil refinery as well as tar from Isfahan steel mill. The year after Asghar Ebrahimi Asl left the management of the Metro Company and Mohsen Hashemi succeeded him, the first line of the Tehran Metro was launched between Tehran and Karaj.

On 7 March 1999, an overland Tehran-Karaj express electric train started a limited service of 31.4 km (19.5 mi) between Azadi Square (Tehran) and Malard (Karaj) that called at one intermediate station at Vardavard.

Line 5 of the Tehran metro began operating in 1999. Iran's first metro system, the line was constructed by the Chinese company NORINCO.

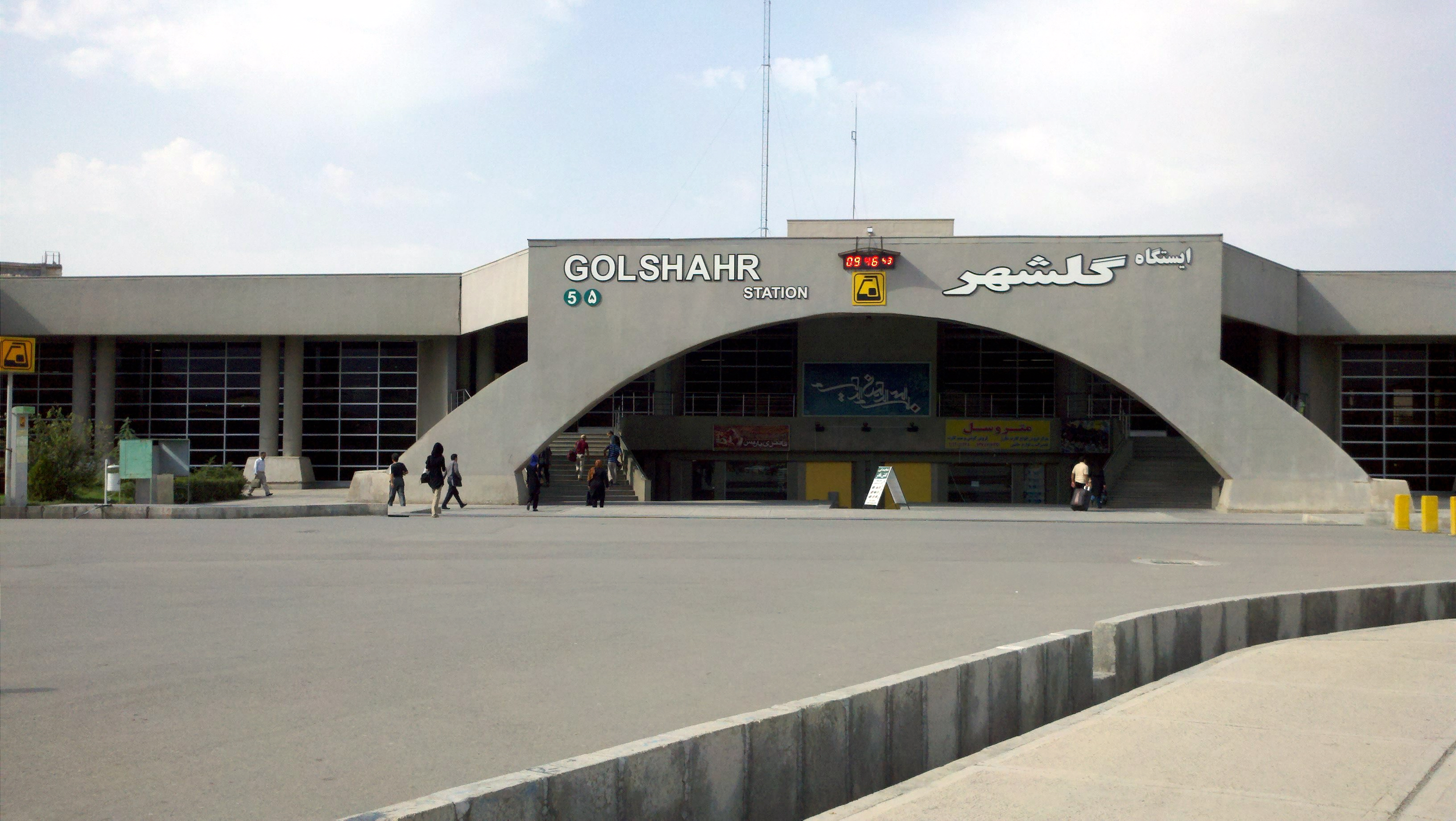
Golshahr (Line 5) commuter rail station

From 2000 onwards, commercial operation began on Lines 1 and 2. The wagons on these lines are provided by CRV via CNTIC. The railway tracks and points on these lines are provided by the Austrian company Voestalpine.

The Metro uses equipment manufactured by a wide range of international companies: double-deck passenger cars for the Tehran-Karaj regional line are supplied by CRV some trains are from SEGC via CNTIC and assembled by the Wagon Pars factory in Arak.

As of 2010, approximately $2 billion had been spent on the Metro project. The Tehran Metro transports about 2.5 million passengers daily through its 7 operational lines (Lines 1, 2, 3, 4, 5, 6, and 7). It also has additional one line under construction (Line 10), and an additional two lines in engineering phase (8 and 9). New 80 wagons have been added to the system in September 2012 to ease transportation and reduce rush-hour congestion. Iran is able to produce its need in wagons and trains independently.

A 2.8-kilometre (1.7 mi) branch line of Line 4 began running to Mehrabad International Airport on 15 March 2016. A 31-kilometre (19 mi) express line to Imam Khomeini International Airport was opened in August 2017.

Amidst the COVID-19 cases increasing in Iran, Tehran Metro made wearing masks a requirement to enter the metro network at any station. Law enforcement located in every station were ordered to prevent passengers from entering without masks and such passengers would be led to purchase masks from mask selling desks located at every metro station.

== Lines ==
Map of Tehran Metro

=== List ===
Line	Opening	Length	Stations	Type
1	2001	92 km (57 mi)	32	Metro and Commuter rail
2	2000	26 km (16 mi)	22	Metro
3	2012	37 km (23 mi)	25	Metro
4	2008	26 km (16 mi)	23	Metro
5	1999	69 km (43 mi)	13	Commuter rail
6	2019	32 km (20 mi)	26	Metro
7	2017	28 km (17 mi)	22	Metro
Metro Subtotal:				
Total:		310 km (193 mi)	163	Metro and Commuter rail

=== Line 1 ===

Line 1, coloured red on system maps, is 92 kilometers (57 mi) long, of which 14.9 km (9.3 mi) are underground (from Tajrish station to Shoush-Khayyam crossing) and the rest runs at surface level. There are 32 stations along this line of which 22 stations are located underground and 10 above ground. As of 2018, the total capacity of line 1 is 650,000 passenger per day, with trains stopping at each station for 20 seconds. The trains are each made up of seven wagons, with a nominal capacity of 1,300 seated and standing passengers. The maximum speed of the trains is 80 km/h (50 mph) which is tempered to an average of 45 km/h (28 mph) due to stoppages at stations along the route.

Line 1 runs mostly north–south. A 4.1 kilometers (2.5 mi), three station extension of the line from Mirdamad station to Qolhak station opened on 20 May 2009. The 4 kilometers (2.5 mi), four stations second phase of this extension from Qolhak station to Tajrish Square was completed in 2011. Construction was to be completed by March 2007 but faced major issues due to large boulders and rock bed in part of the tunnels as well as water drainage issues. It has also faced major financing issues as the government has refused to release funds earmarked for the project to the municipality.

Since August 2017, one of Line 1's stations, Darvazeh Dowlat is open 24 hours a day, in order to accommodate passengers travelling to and from Imam Khomeini Airport via Line 1.

Line 1 connects Tehran to Imam Khomeini International Airport. Its first phase, to Shahr-e-Aftab station, opened in 2016, and the airport station opened in August 2017. It is the only metro line in Tehran that is completely open 24 hours a day (even if the frequency is only 80 minutes), in order to accommodate passengers from late night and early morning flights (Line 1's Darvazeh Dowlat station is the only other metro station outside of Line 1 with that classification). A third phase, completed in 2023, extended Line 1 to the satellite city of Parand and brought the total length of the line to 50 km (31 mi). Its 120 km (75 mi) per hour speeds classify it as an express subway line, the first of its kind on the Tehran Metro.

=== Line 2 ===
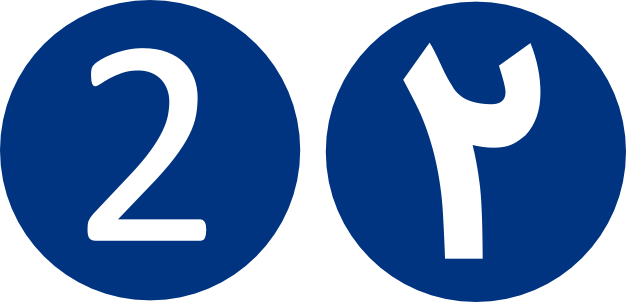

This line opened between Sadeghieh and Imam Khomeini in February 2000. Line 2 is 26 kilometers (16 mi) long, with 23.6 km (14.7 mi) underground and 2.4 kilometers (1.5 mi) elevated. There are 22 stations along the line, of which Imam Khomeini Station was shared by Line 1. Line 2 is coloured blue on system maps and runs mostly east–west through the city.

The line was extended from Imam-Khomeini to Baharestan Metro Station in 2004, and to Shahid Madani, Sarsabz and Elm-o-Sanat University in March 2006 with the intermediate stations, Darvazeh Shemiran and Sabalan, opening in July 2006. It was extended further from Elm-o-Sanat University to Tehran Pars in February 2009, and to Farhangsara in June 2010. The extension phase to new east terminal is under construction.

=== Line 3 ===
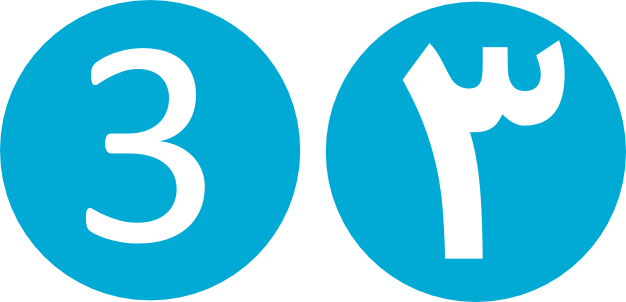

Line 3 travels from northeast to southwest. Line 3 is one of the most important lines as it connects southwest Tehran to northeast, crosses busy parts of the capital city, and can help to alleviate traffic problems. About 7 kilometers (4.3 mi) of Line 3 became operational in December 2012, followed by 12 kilometers (7.5 mi) in April 2014, and finally, the last section of the line which is 18 kilometers (11 mi) opened on 22 September 2015, increasing the length of the line to a total of 37 kilometers (23 mi), and serving 25 stations as of May 2021.

=== Line 4 ===

The line is 26 km (16 mi) long with 23 stations. which connects the western part of Tehran to eastern part. This line initially runs through Ekbatan (western Tehran) to Kolahdooz (eastern Tehran). The construction of a western extension to line 4 has been started in 2012 connecting Ekbatan to Chaharbagh Sq. This extension will include 3 stations. A sub-line of this line connects Bimeh station to Mehrabad Airport. This sub-line has 3 stations at Bimeh, Terminal 1&2 and Terminal 4&6.

Section 1, from Ferdowsi Square to Darvazeh Shemiran, opened in April 2008. Section 2 from Darvazeh shemiran to Shohada Square opened in February 2009. On 24 May 2009, Section 3 from Ferdowsi Square to Enghelab Square opened. On 23 July 2012, two more stations were inaugurated, connecting line 4 with line 5.

Currently there are 23 stations in operation on Line 4, coloured yellow on the system maps.

=== Line 5 ===

Line 5 is coloured green on system maps; it is a 69-kilometer-long (43 mi) commuter rail line and has 13 stations. Entering the area of Karaj with main stations at Karaj and Golshahr and Hashtgerd. It connects with the western end of Line 2 at Tehran (Sadeghiyeh) station, and with the western end of Line 4 at Eram-e Sabz Metro Station.

=== Line 6 ===

Line 6 is pink coloured on system maps. An initial 9-kilometer-long (5.6 mi) section between Shohada Square to Dowlat Abad opened on 7 April 2019. This line is 32 km (20 mi) long with 26 stations right now. When completed, this line will be 42 km (26 mi) long with 32 stations, connecting southeast Tehran to northwest. A tunnel boring machine (TBM) is used to construct the tunnel. TBM is using earth pressure balanced method to pass safely through urban areas without considerable settlement.

=== Line 7 ===

This line, similar to line 6, and in contrast with line 3, goes from northwest to southeast and was constructed with modern TBM machines. Its first phase, consisting of 18 km (11 mi) of line and 7 stations, was opened in June 2017. This line has 28 km (17 mi) with 22 stations right now.

== Future plans ==
There are several plans to expand Tehran's metro network to over 500 km (310 mi) in total. Some plans only concern additional inserted stations, like Vavan on line 1 in the South. Some extensions and completely new lines are under construction, some extensions or new lines are proposals in the moment.

Line	Status	Length	Stations	Type
3	Under construction	15.5 km (9.6 mi)	5 (planned)	Metro
8	Under construction	40 km (25 mi)	35 (planned)	Metro
9	Under construction	52 km (32 mi)	39 (planned)	Metro
10	Under construction	43 km (27 mi)	35 (planned)	Metro
11	Under construction	33 km (21 mi)	21 (planned)	Metro

=== Under construction ===
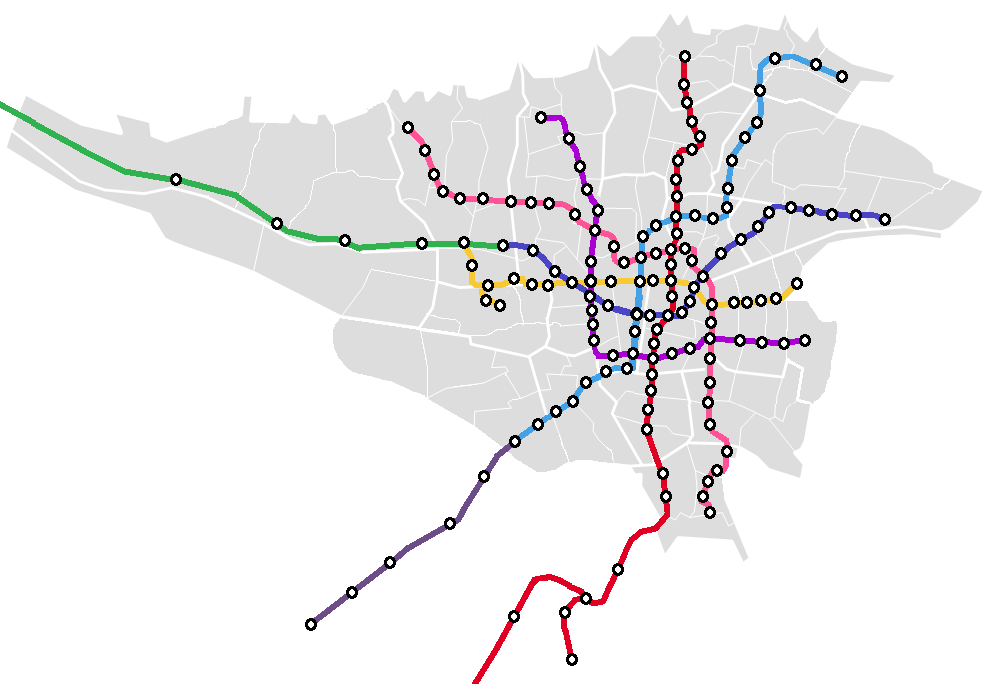
Map of Tehran Metro Extension of Line's 3 under construction plan

==== Line 3 (formerly named Eslamshahr line) ====
In the south, line 3 will continue for 15.5 km (9.6 mi) from the terminus Azadegan with 5 new stations to Eslamshahr. Originally, the plan was to build a commuter rail-link like line 5 with a new interchange platform at Azadegan under the name "Eslamshahr Line". But until construction began in January 2019, the plans were changed into a transfer-free extension of the existing route. The opening is scheduled for 2026.

==== Line 6 ====
Line 6 extension is on the way in the southeastern, where 5 new stations and 10 km (6.2 mi) from the terminus Shohada-ye Dowlat Abad are built is under construction. The opening is scheduled for 2026.

==== Line 7 ====
There is an extension of 2 station from northwestern under construction.

==== Line 4 ====
There is an extension of 2 station from northwestern under construction.

==== Line 2 ====
Line 2 extension is on the way in the east, where 2 new stations are built is under construction.

==== Line 10 ====
The completely rebuilt line 10, coloured dark blue in the system map, stretching 43 kilometres (27 mi) with 35 stations will run along a west–east corridor from Vardavard metro station of line 5 in the west of Tehran towards the area of Kosar aqueduct in the east with an interchange to the extended line 4. Construction started in September 2020.

==== Line 8 ====
Line 8 of Tehran's Metro, coloured brown in the system map, is a planned circular line, surrounding the city center from Fadak station (line 2) in the North, over the West, and ending in the southeastern borough of Shahrak-e-Valfajr. It might have 35 stations, 21 of them newly built, while the others will be expanded existing ones becoming interchange stations to other lines. Construction started in March 2024.

==== Line 9 ====
The planned line 9 of the metro network, coloured golden in the system map, is another circular line, starting further west at line 5 station Chitgar, passing the city center in the North, turning south and ending at line 6 station Dowlat Abad. It might have 39 stations all together, 27 of them new constructed, while the others will be expansions of existing stations to become interchanges to other lines. Construction started in May 2024.

==== Line 11 ====
Line 11, coloured light green in the system map, is another planned tangent line, starting from Chitgar station at line 5, connecting the southern parts of Tehran, and ending in the Southeast in the borough of Eslam Abad. It might have 21 stations, most of them newly built, just five to be expanded existing stations to become interchanges with other lines. Construction started February 2026.

=== Further plans ===
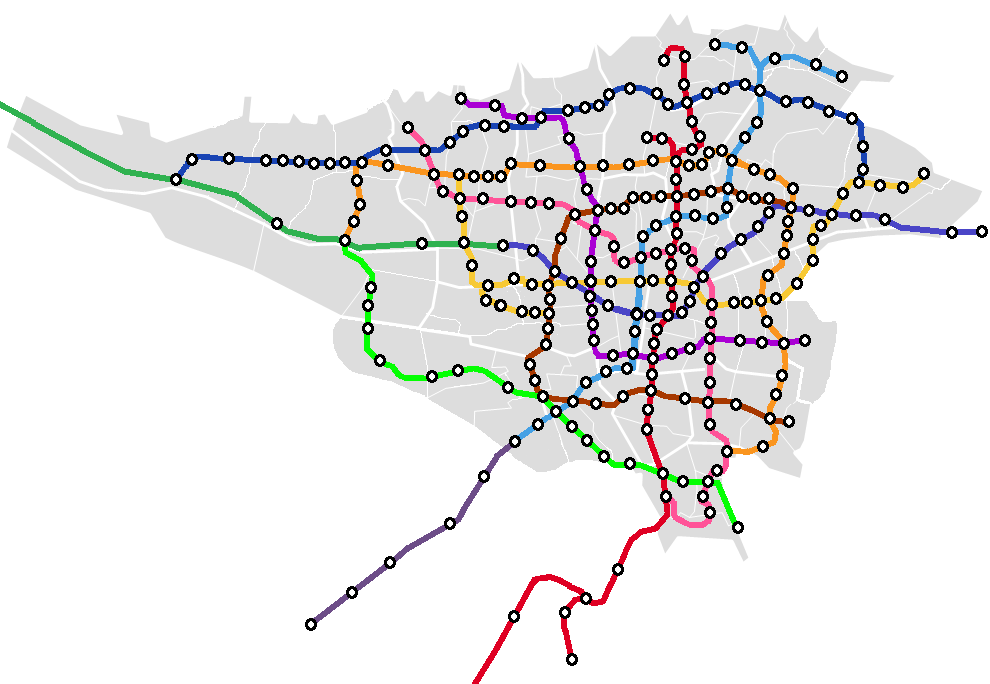
Future network plan (including all recent proposals as of 2023)

==== LRT Lines ====
Three LRT (Tram) lines are proposed along with the Metro lines.

==== Express Commuter Railway ====
Three other commuter Rail lines are planned along with Line 5 (Tehran-Karaj-Hashtgerd Commuter Rail) bringing the total Metro Commuter Rails to 4 Lines .

== Interchange stations ==
- 1 – Darvazeh Shemiran; Lines 2 & 4
- 2 – Shahid Beheshti; Lines 1 & 3
- 3 – Darvazeh Dowlat; Lines 1 & 4
- 4 – Imam Khomeini; Lines 1 & 2
- 5 – Theatr-e Shahr; Lines 3 & 4
- 6 – Shademan; Lines 2 & 4
- 7 – (Tehran) Sadeghiyeh; Lines 2 & 5
- 8 – Eram-e Sabz; Lines 4 & 5
- 9 – Shahid Navvab-e Safavi; Lines 2 & 7
- 10 – Mahdiyeh; Lines 3 & 7
- 11 – Meydan-e Shohada; Lines 4 & 6
- 12 – Meydan-e Mohammadiyeh; Lines 1 & 7
- 13 – Imam Hossein; Lines 2 & 6
- 14 – Daneshgah-e Tarbiat Modares; Lines 6 & 7
- 15 – Towhid; Lines 4 & 7
- 16 – Shohada-ye Haftom-e Tir; Lines 1 & 6
- 17 – Meydan-e Vali Asr; Lines 3 & 6
- 18 – Shohada-ye Hefdah-e Shahrivar; Lines 6 & 7 (under construction on line 6, operational on line 7)
- 19 – Ayatollah Kashani; Lines 4 & 6 (under construction on line 4, operational on line 6)
- 20 – Shahr-e-Rey; Lines 1 & 6 (operational on line 1, under construction on line 6)

== Safety ==
All routes have been equipped with automatic train protection (ATP), automatic train stop (ATS), centralized traffic control (CTC), and SCADA. More and more residents use the metro due to the improvement in the peak-hour headways, the opening of more stations and overall improvement with new escalators, elevators, and air-conditioning in the trains.

On 18 July 2007, a twenty square metres area immediately adjacent to the entrance of the Toupkhaneh metro station caved in. There were no casualties, but the station had to undergo numerous repairs. On 15 April 2012, safety walls of Mianrood River broke due to heavy rain in Tehran, and consequently, 300,000 cubic meters of water entered metro tunnel of Line 4. The two nearest stations were still under construction, so Metro operators had enough time to evacuate other stations from passengers. Nobody was killed, but water depth in the Habib-o-llah station, the deepest station on Line 4, was estimated to be near 18 meters. It took nearly two weeks to reopen the flooded stations which were previously in operation.

== Complaints ==
The Cultural Heritage Organization of Iran has complained that the vibrations caused by the Metro were having a significant and highly adverse effect on the Masoudieh Mansion in the Baharestan neighbourhood of central Tehran. The Cultural Heritage Organisation has also complained about vibrations near other historic sites such as the Golestan Palace and the National Museum of Iran.

== Tickets ==
Regular single table tickets

You can only use the subway once with this ticket. This ticket costs 12,000 Rials. If you plan to take a round trip, you need to get two single tickets.

Suburban single table tickets

This is the ticket from the 5th metro line that reaches Sadeghieh station from Karaj station. This ticket costs 12,000 Rials.

International Airport Single Ticket

This ticket is used for the subway line of Imam Khomeini Airport. This ticket costs 90,000 Rials.

Electronic ticket

You can use the subway as many times as you want by charging it. The cost of each of these e-cards is 30,000 Rials or 50,000 Rials and you can charge up to 500,000 Rials after purchase. You can charge your e-card using various booths and wall-mounted electronic charging devices at the bus and subway stations, either by cash or by bank credit card and with non-attendance methods such as my Tehran app

== Tehran Metro Snapshot ==
	Tehran Metro		
	Stations	Length (km)	Annual Ridership (in millions)
	163 (May 2026)	310 (November 2023)	820 (2018)
Ranking
Iran	1 (2026)	1 (2026)	1 (2026)
Asia	17 (March 2022)	16 (March 2022)	?
World	25 (March 2022)	20 (March 2022)	?

== Gallery ==
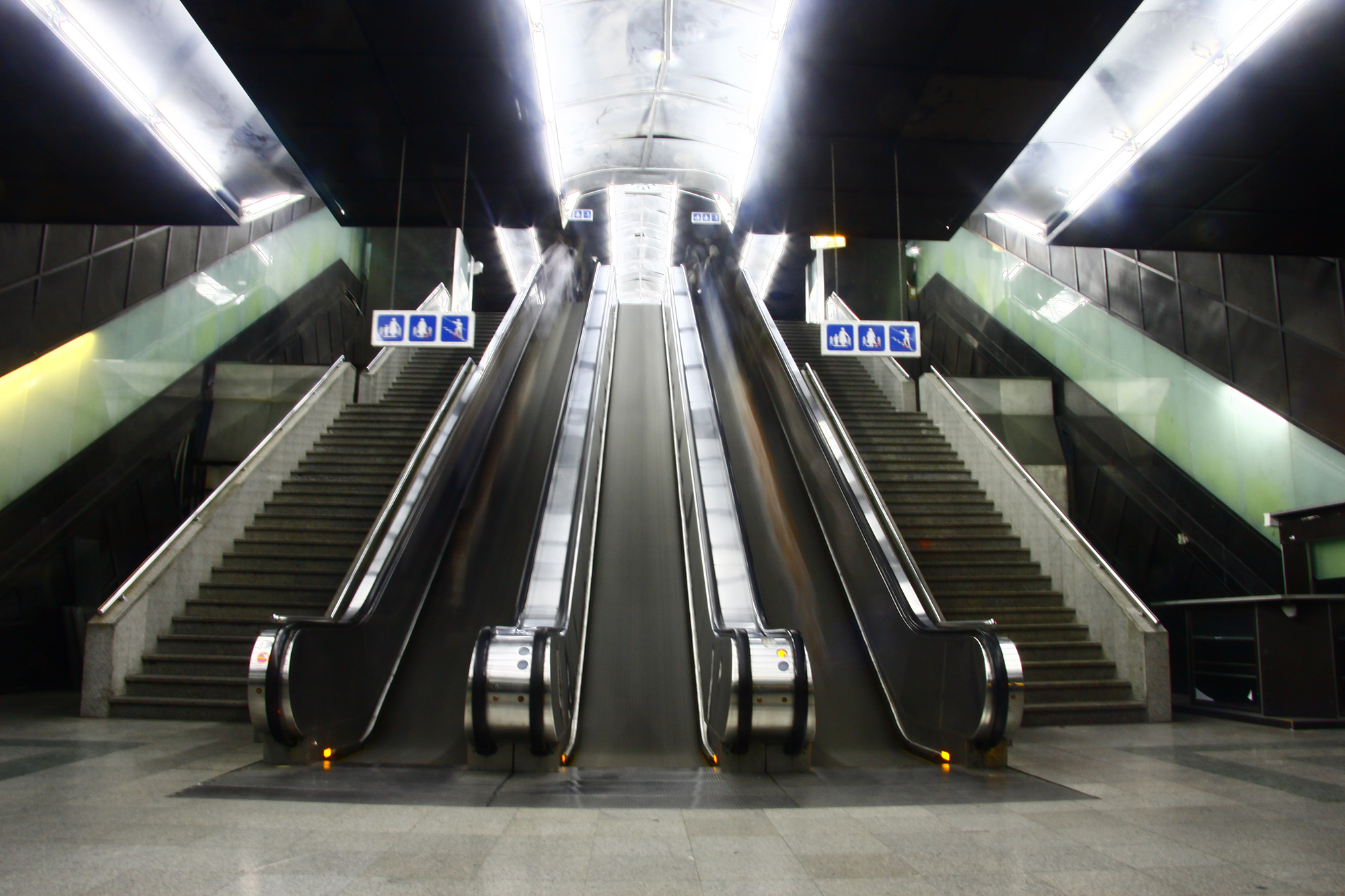
Escalators at Haghani Metro Station

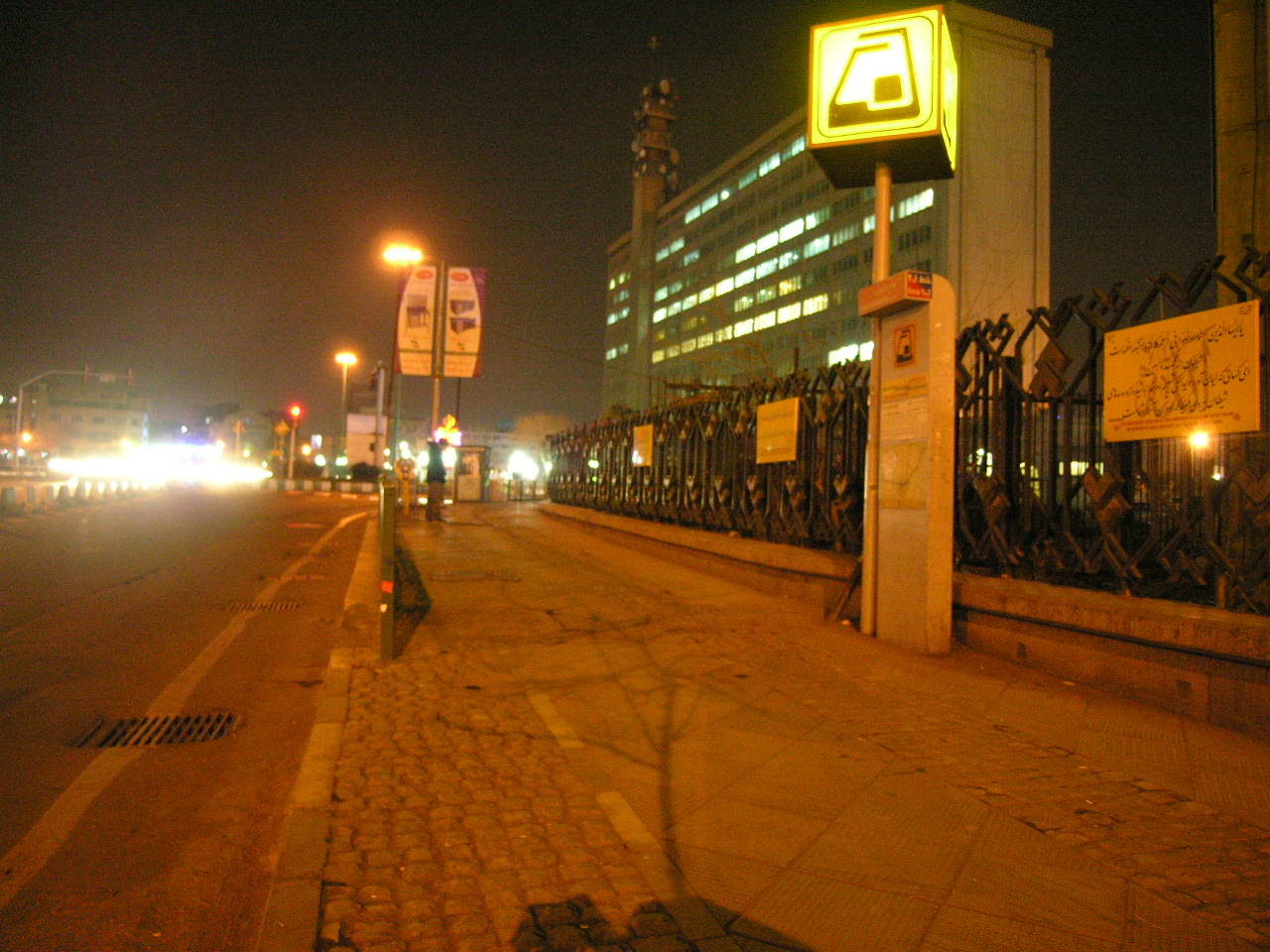
Tehran Metro in 2012

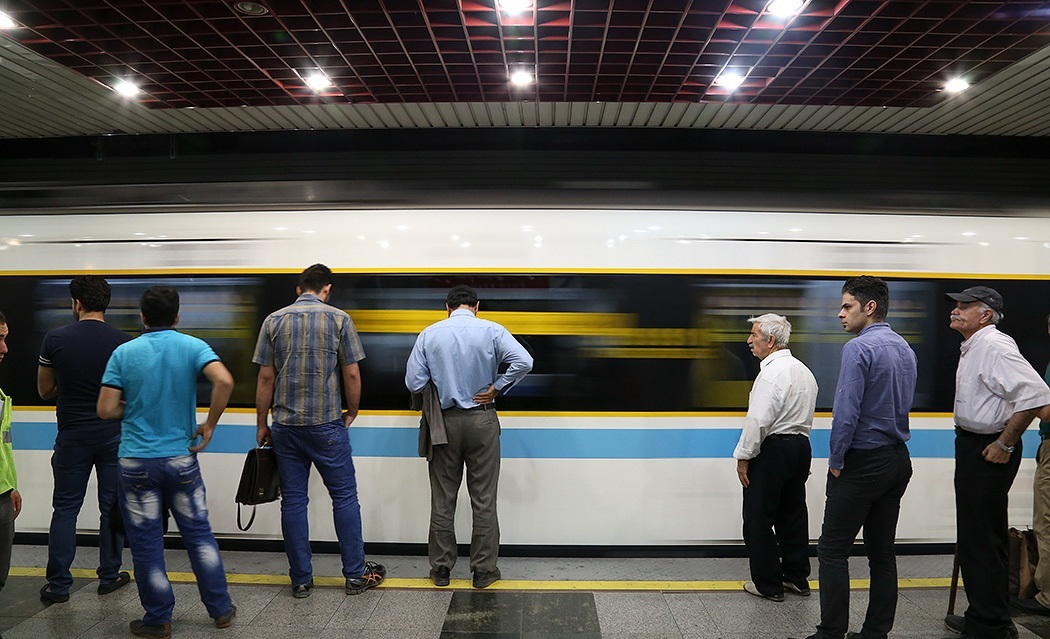
Passengers wait to board a train in 2018

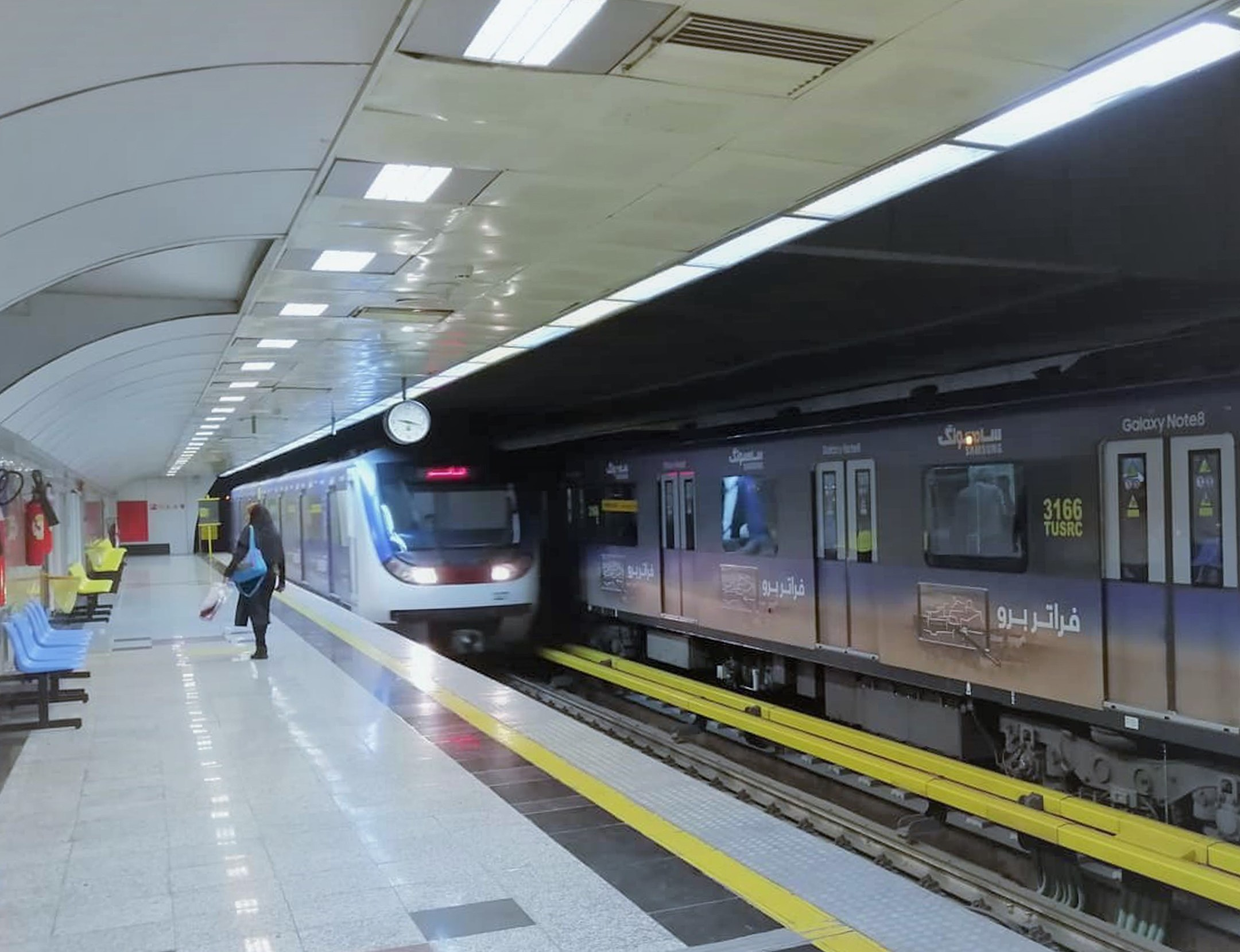
Samsung advertising in Tehran Metro

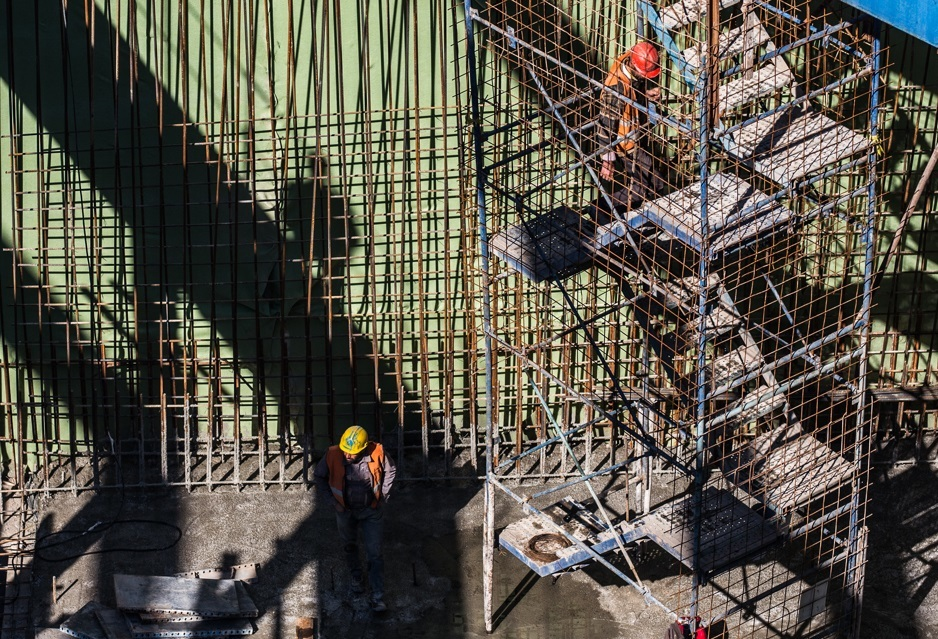
Tehran Metro Line 6

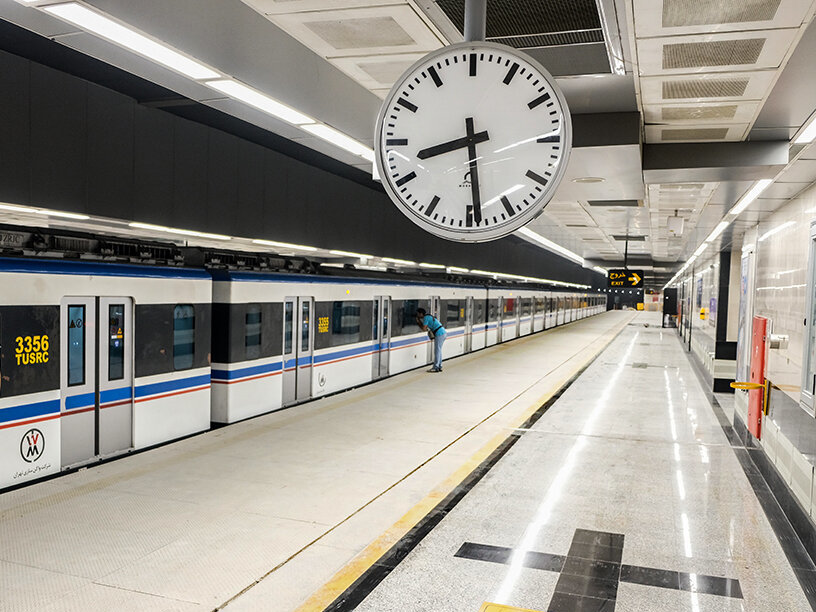
Tehran Metro Line 7

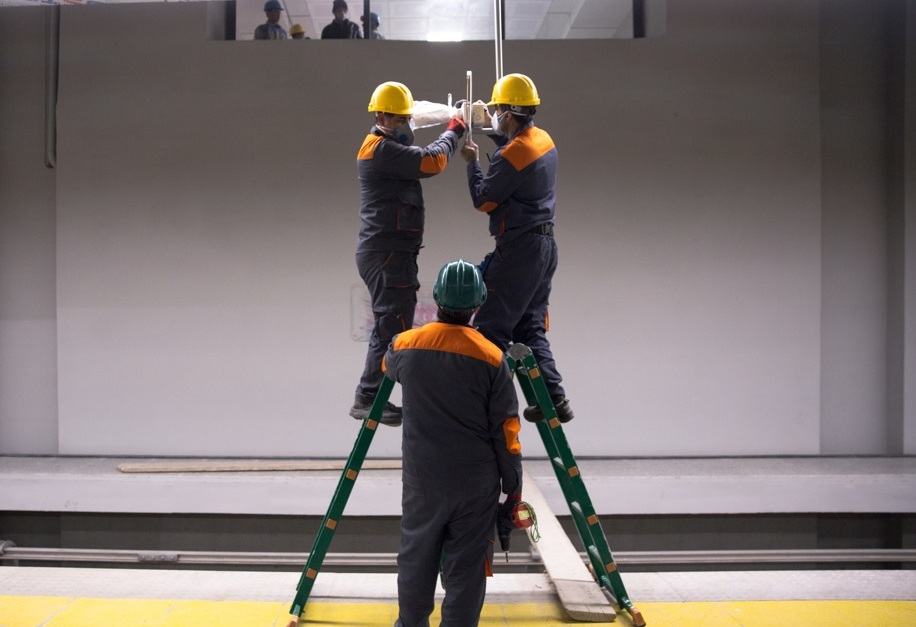
Tehran Metro Line 7

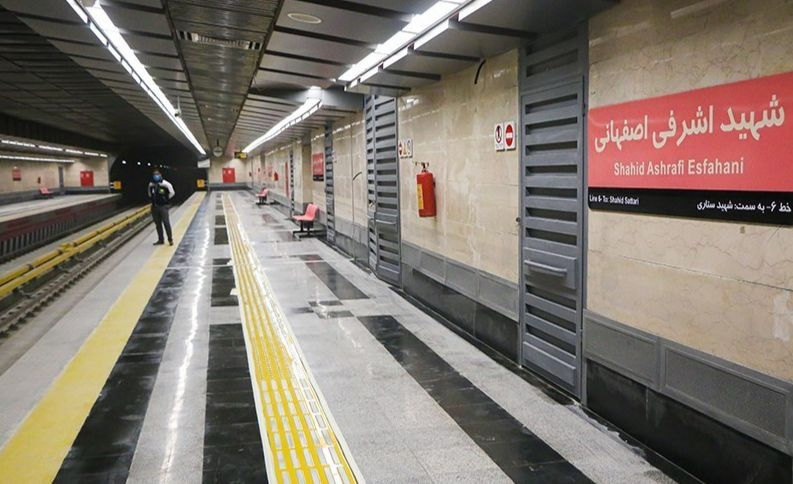
Ashrafi Esfahani Metro Station at Tehran Metro Line 6

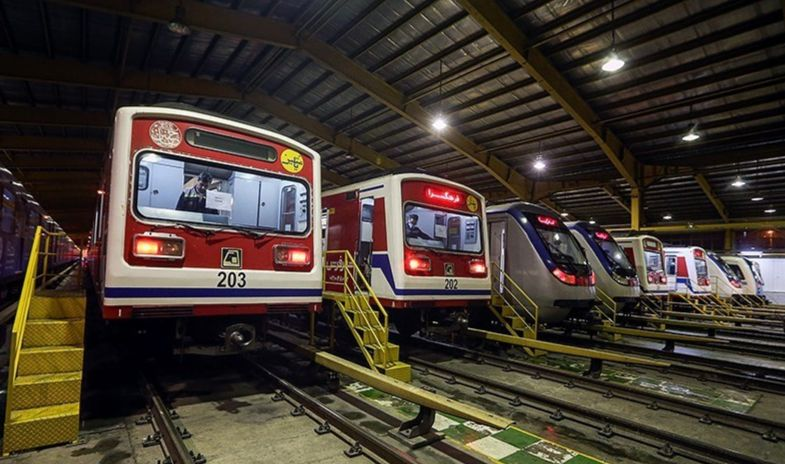
Tehran Metro Depot

Tehran Subway arriving at the Vali-e-asr station

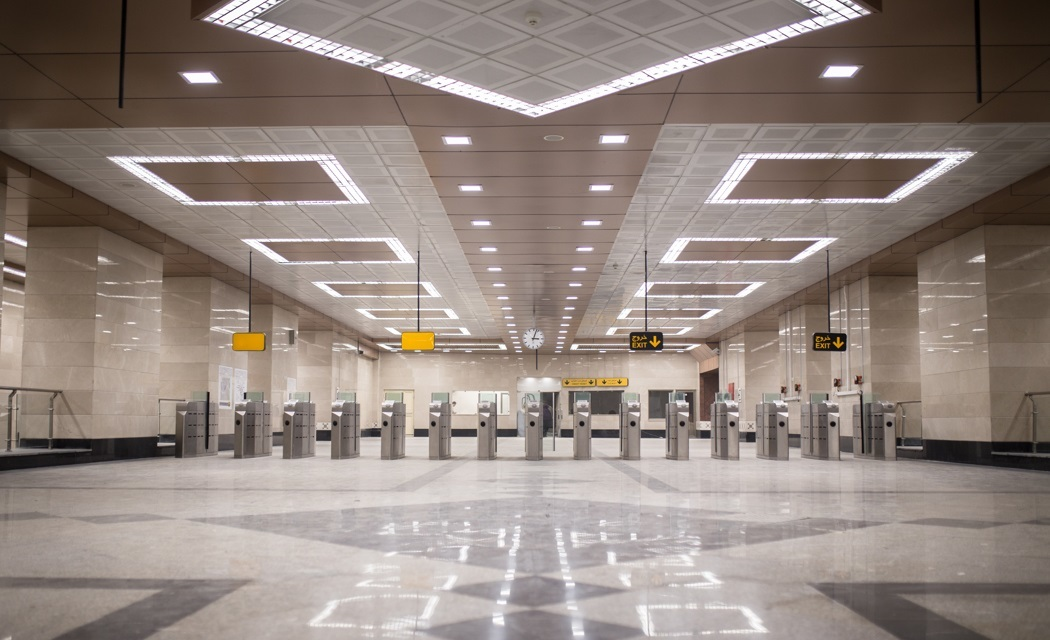
Meydan-e San'at Metro Station (Line 7)

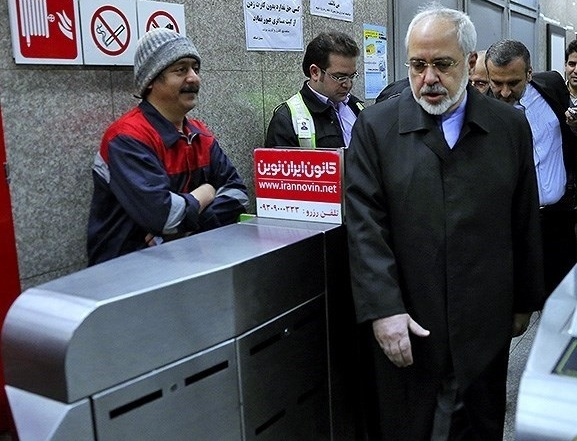
Former foreign Minister Mohammad Javad Zarif, entering the metro

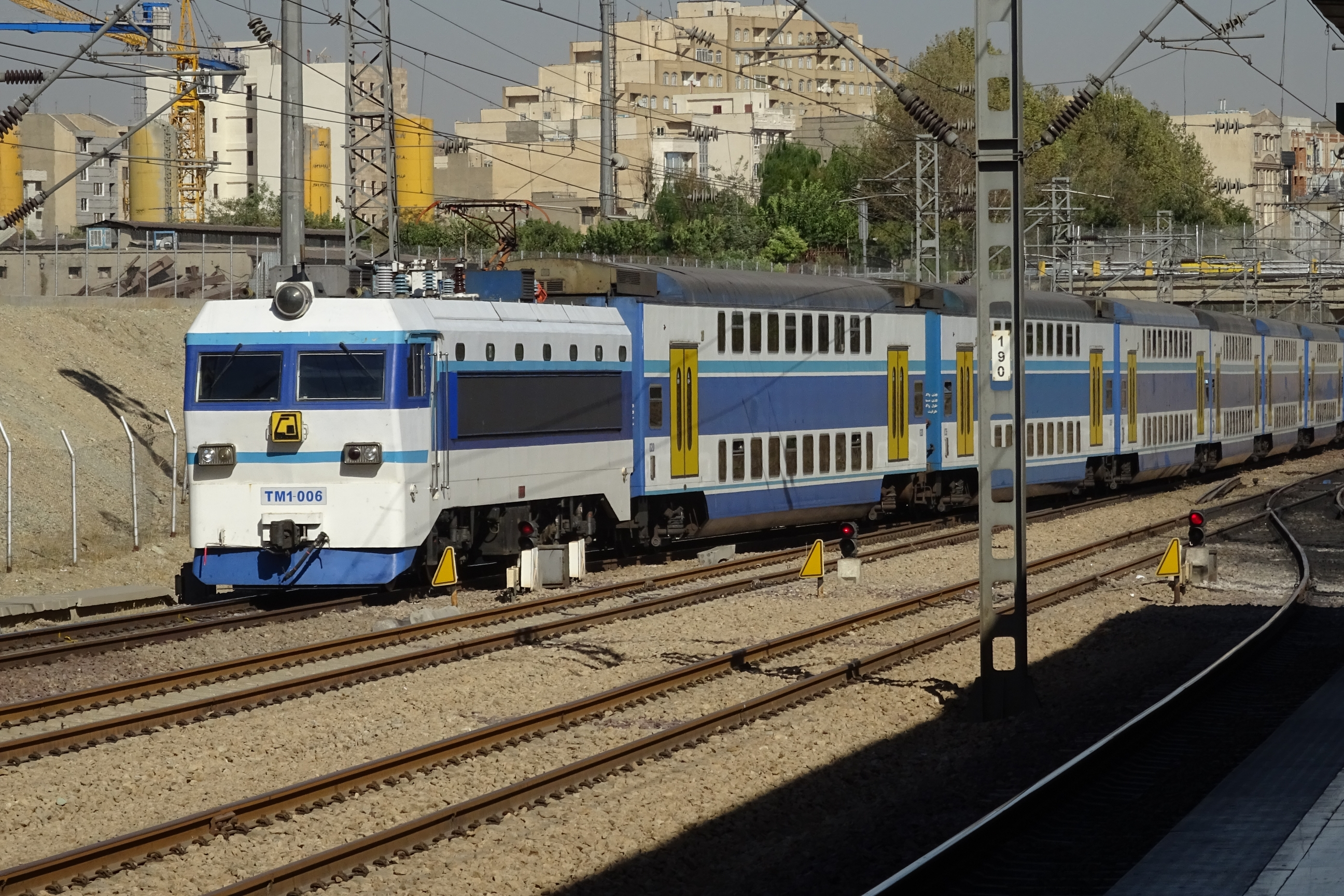
Tehran Suburban Railway train

== See also ==
- List of metro systems
- Tehran Bus Rapid Transit
- Tehran Monorail
- Trolleybuses in Tehran
- Transport in Iran
- List of Tehran Metro stations
