= Farhangsara Metro Station =

Station of the Tehran Metro

Farhangsara Metro Station ایستگاه مترو فرهنگسرا

General information
- Location: Jashnvareh Blvd. District 4, Tehran, Tehran County; Iran
- Coordinates: 35.7298°N 51.5469°E
- System: Tehran Metro Station
- Operator: Tehran Urban and Suburban Railways Organization (Metro)
- Connections: Tehran Buses: 398 Tehranpars Int.-Hakimieh; 401 Elm-o-Sanat Metro-Emam Hossein Univ.; Rudehen Buses: Rudehen-Pardis-Tehran

History
- Opened: 1389 H-Kh (2010)

Services
Preceding station	Tehran Metro	Following station
Tehranpars towards Tehran (Sadeghiyeh)	Line 2	Terminus
Location

Farhangsara Metro Station is the eastern end of Tehran Metro Line 2, in Iran. It was opened in 2010, with Mohammad-Bagher Ghalibaf attending the inauguration. It is located in Jashnvareh Street in Tehranpars neighborhood. The next station is Tehran Pars Metro Station.
