= Tehran (Sadeghiyeh) Metro Station =

Metro station in Tehran, Iran

Tehran (Sadeghiyeh) Metro Station (ایستگاه مترو تهران (صادقیه
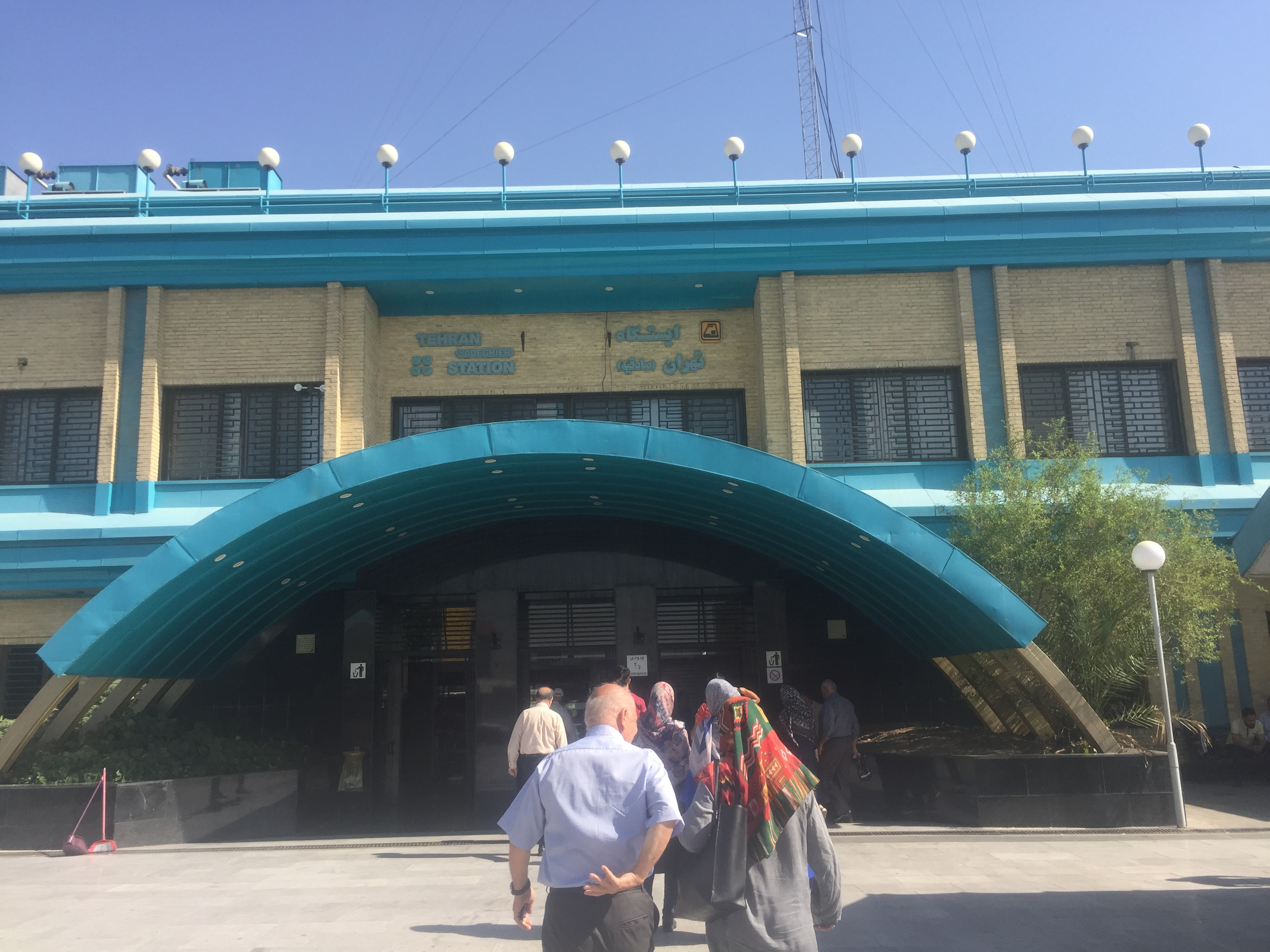
- The main door of Sadeghiyeh Metro Station

General information
- Location: Sadeghiyeh, District 5, Tehran; Tehran Province, Iran
- Coordinates: 35.7178°N 51.3308°E
- System: Tehran Metro Station
- Operator: Tehran Urban and Suburban Railways Organization (Metro)
- Platforms: 2 cross-platform interchange
- Tracks: 4
- Connections: Tehran Buses: 279 Sadeghiyeh Metro-North Jannatabad; 280 Azadi Term.-Kuhsar Term.; 284 Sadeghiyeh Metro-Kan; 285 Sadeghiyeh Metro-Shahran; 286 Sadeghiyeh Metro-South Jannatabad; 288 Azadi Term.-San'at Sq.; 290 Sadeghiyeh Metro-San'at Sq.; 322 Sadeghiyeh Metro-Jozani St.; 324 Sadeghiyeh Metro-Shahrak-e Baqeri; 328 Sadeghiyeh Metro-Dehkade-ye Olympik; 368 Azadi Term.-Seyyed Khandan; 369 Azadi Term.-Vanak Sq.; 372 Sadeghiyeh Metro-Valiasr Sq.; 378 Sadeghiyeh Metro-Sarvari Term.; 391 Sadeghiyeh Metro-Shadabad; 415 Sadeghiyeh Metro-Shahak-e Darya; 416 Sadeghiyeh Metro-East Tehransar

Construction
- Structure type: Surface
- Platform levels: 1
- Accessible: Disabled parking permit; Wheelchair lift

Other information
- Website: http://metro.tehran.ir/Default.aspx?tabid=244&pid=22&iid=7

History
- Opened: 7 March 1999; 21 February 2000

Services
Preceding station	Tehran Metro	Following station
Terminus	Line 2	Tarasht towards Farhangsara
Eram-e Sabz towards Hashtgerd	Line 5	Terminus
Location

Tehran (Sadeghiyeh) Metro Station is the junction of Tehran Metro Line 2 and Tehran Metro Line 5. It is located in Sadeghiye neighborhood near Mohammad Ali Jenah Expressway and Tehran-Karaj Freeway. It is the west end of Line 2 and the east end of Line 5. The next station in Line 2 is Tarasht Metro Station and the next station in Line 5 is Eram-e Sabz Metro Station. It also has a big parking lot and is considered as the most crowded Tehran metro station. It is currently the only above ground station on Tehran Metro Line 2.
