= Tehran and Suburbs Bus Company =

Iranian public transport company

Coordinates: 35°42′5″N 51°26′53″E

- Founded: 1920
- Service area: Tehran- Iran
- Service type: Bus service
- Fleet: 30 trolleybuses
- Operator: Tehran Municipality
- Chief executive: Mahdi Alizadeh (CEO)

Tehran and Suburbs Bus Company is a public transport agency running transit buses in Tehran, Iran, and surrounding cities. It is also the operator of Tehran Bus Rapid Transit.
