= Malard and Suburbs Bus Organization =

Malard and Suburbs Bus Organization سازمان اتوبوسرانی ملارد و حومه
- Founded: October 27, 2003
- Service area: Malard, Malard County, Tehran Province; Iran
- Service type: Bus service
- Routes: 9 Routes
- Fleet: 137
- Daily ridership: 65,000 (2010)
- Annual ridership: 23,717,615
- Operator: Malard Municipality
- Website: سازمان اتوبوسرانی ملارد و حومه

Malard and Suburbs Bus Organization (Persian: سازمان اتوبوسرانی ملارد و حومه) is a public transport agency running transit buses in Malard and surrounding areas in Tehran Province.

== List of routes ==
Colour	Name	Length (km)	Number of Buses	Number of Stations in Malrad urban area	Headway (Min)	Connections
	Malard-Karaj	17.5	18	13	15	Karaj Metro Station; Shahid Soltani Bus Terminal Karaj City Buses: Fardis-Chamran; Soltani-Fardis; Soltani-Bonyad; Soltani-Be'sat; Soltani-Baghestan; Soltani-Hesarak-e Bala; Soltani-Owj; Soltani-Shahrak-e Taleghani; Soltani-Azad University; Chamran-Vahdat; Soltani-Hesarak (Express); Soltani-Hasanabad; Andisheh City Buses: Andisheh-Karaj Metro-Chamran terminal
	Malard-Shahriar	14	15	18	10	Shahriar City Buses: Shahriar-Azadi; Shahriar-Azari; Shahriar-Andisheh; Shahriar-Safadasht; Shahriar-Vahidieh; Shahriar-Ferdowsieh; Shahriar-Karaj; Shahriar-Shahedshahr; Shahriar-Sabashahr; Shahriar-Amirieh; Baghestan City Buses: Dehshad-Shahriar
	Marlik-Azadi	46	21	18	10	Meydan-e Azadi Metro Station; Tehran Western Terminal Tehran Buses: Tehran BRT; BRT 1; BRT 2; BRT 10; Tehran City Buses; 252 Azadi Term.-Shahrak-e Shahrdari; 253 Azadi Term.-Shahrak-e Daneshgah; 280 Azadi Term.-Kuhsar Term.; 288 Azadi Term.-San'at Sq.; 323 Azadi Term.-Shahrak-e Baqeri; 355 Azadi Term.-Haft-e Tir; 368 Azadi Term.-Seyyed Khandan; 369 Azadi Term.-Vanak Sq.; 370 Airport-Vanak Sq.; 374 Azadi Term.-Ebrahimabad Blvd.; 375 Azadi Term.- Yaftabad; 385 Azadi Term.-Shahrak-e Valiasr; 412 Azadi Term.-Khalij-e Fars Blvd.; 414 Azadi Term.-Shahrak-e Darya; 427 Azadi Term.-Shahr-e Aftab; 901 Azadi Term.-Tehranpars Int.; 902 Azadi Term.-Khavaran Term.; 910 Azadi Term.-IUST; Andisheh City Buses: Andisheh-Azadi; Andisheh-Azari; Andisheh-Karaj Metro-Chamran terminal; Baghestan City Buses: Nasirabad-Azadi; Nasirabad-Azari; Eslamshahr City Buses: Eslamshahr-Azadi; Ahmadabad-e Mostowfi-Azadi; Firuz Bahram-Azadi; Vavan-Azadi (Special); Shahrak-e Emam Hosein-Azadi (Special); Shahriar City Buses: Shahriar-Azadi
	Sarasiab-Azadi	42	37	10	15	Meydan-e Azadi Metro Station; Tehran Western Terminal Tehran Buses: Tehran BRT; BRT 1; BRT 2; BRT 10; Tehran City Buses; 252 Azadi Term.-Shahrak-e Shahrdari; 253 Azadi Term.-Shahrak-e Daneshgah; 280 Azadi Term.-Kuhsar Term.; 288 Azadi Term.-San'at Sq.; 323 Azadi Term.-Shahrak-e Baqeri; 355 Azadi Term.-Haft-e Tir; 368 Azadi Term.-Seyyed Khandan; 369 Azadi Term.-Vanak Sq.; 370 Airport-Vanak Sq.; 374 Azadi Term.-Ebrahimabad Blvd.; 375 Azadi Term.- Yaftabad; 385 Azadi Term.-Shahrak-e Valiasr; 412 Azadi Term.-Khalij-e Fars Blvd.; 414 Azadi Term.-Shahrak-e Darya; 427 Azadi Term.-Shahr-e Aftab; 901 Azadi Term.-Tehranpars Int.; 902 Azadi Term.-Khavaran Term.; 910 Azadi Term.-IUST; Andisheh City Buses: Andisheh-Azadi; Andisheh-Azari; Andisheh-Karaj Metro-Chamran terminal; Baghestan City Buses: Nasirabad-Azadi; Nasirabad-Azari; Eslamshahr City Buses: Eslamshahr-Azadi; Ahmadabad-e Mostowfi-Azadi; Firuz Bahram-Azadi; Vavan-Azadi (Special); Shahrak-e Emam Hosein-Azadi (Special); Shahriar City Buses: Shahriar-Azadi
	Marlik-Karaj	20.5	18	18	15	Karaj Metro Station; Shahid Soltani Bus Terminal Karaj City Buses: Fardis-Chamran; Soltani-Fardis; Soltani-Bonyad; Soltani-Be'sat; Soltani-Baghestan; Soltani-Hesarak-e Bala; Soltani-Owj; Soltani-Shahrak-e Taleghani; Soltani-Azad University; Chamran-Vahdat; Soltani-Hesarak (Express); Soltani-Hasanabad; Andisheh City Buses: Andisheh-Karaj Metro-Chamran terminal
	Sarasiab-Qods	22.5	9	28	10	Andisheh City Buses: Andisheh-Azadi; Andisheh-Azari; Andisheh-Karaj Metro-Chamran terminal; Qods City Buses: Vardavard Metro-Qods Sq.
	Shahrak-e Golha-Fardis 5th Sq.	12	8	18	15	Karaj City Buses: Fardis-Shahrak-e Naz
	Malard-Bidganeh	8	4	15	10	Shahriar City Buses: Sahhriar-Safadasht
	Malard-Qeshlaq	6	2	10	20	Shahriar City Buses: Sahhriar-Safadasht
