= Eslamshahr and Suburbs Bus Organization =

Eslamshahr and Suburbs Bus Organization سازمان اتوبوسرانی اسلامشهر و حومه
- Founded: 1991
- Headquarters: Eslamshahr, Saeidi Exp'way, Sayyad Blvd., Ta'avon St.
- Service area: Eslamshahr-Chahardangeh-Ahmadabad-e Mostowfi-Firuzbahram-Chichaklu, Eslamshahr County, Aderan, Baharestan County; Tehran Province; Iran
- Service type: Bus service
- Routes: 12 Routes
- Fleet: ~200
- Daily ridership: ~100,000
- Operator: Eslamshahr Municipality
- Chief executive: Mohammad Hosein Zare' Fard
- Website: سازمان اتوبوسرانی اسلامشهر و حومه

Eslamshahr and Suburbs Bus Organization (Persian: سازمان اتوبوسرانی اسلامشهر و حومه) is a public transport agency running Transit buses in Eslamshahr County's localities and connects them to Tehran and its Metro System.

There are 3 special routes in the system (Persian: فوق العاده), these routes only have stops in the neighbourhood they start their route from.

== List of routes ==
Colour	Name	Length (km)	Fare(Rials)	Connections
	Eslamshahr (Qa'em Sq.)-Azadi	27	4250	Azadegan Metro Station; Meydan-e Azadi Metro Station; Tehran Western Terminal Tehran BRT: BRT 1; BRT 2; BRT 10; Tehran Buses: 252 Azadi Term.-Shahrak-e Shahrdari; 253 Azadi Term.-Shahrak-e Daneshgah; 280 Azadi Term.-Kuhsar Term.; 288 Azadi Term.-San'at Sq.; 323 Azadi Term.-Shahrak-e Baqeri; 355 Azadi Term.-Haft-e Tir; 368 Azadi Term.-Seyyed Khandan; 369 Azadi Term.-Vanak Sq.; 374 Azadi Term.-Ebrahimabad Blvd.; 375 Azadi Term.- Yaftabad; 385 Azadi Term.-Shahrak-e Valiasr; 412 Azadi Term.-Khalij-e Fars Blvd.; 414 Azadi Term.-Shahrak-e Darya; 427 Azadi Term.-Shahr-e Aftab; 901 Azadi Term.-Tehranpars Int.; 902 Azadi Term.-Khavaran Term.; 910 Azadi Term.-IUST; Andisheh City Buses: Andisheh-Azadi; Andisheh-Azari; Andisheh-Karaj Metro-Chamran terminal; Baghestan City Buses: Nasirabad-Azadi; Nasirabad-Azari; Malard City Buses: Marlik-Azadi; Malard-Azadi; Shahriar City Buses: Shahriar-Azadi
	Eslamshahr (Namaz Sq.)-Shahed	27	4250	Shahed - Bagher Shahr Metro Station
	Mahdieh-Azari	22	3750	Azadegan Metro Station Tehran BRT: BRT 2; Tehran Buses: List not completed; Andisheh City Buses: Andisheh-Azari; Baghestan City Buses: Baghestan(Nasirabad)-Azari; Shahriar City Buses: Shahriar-Azari
	Qa'emieh-Azari	24.5	3750	Azadegan Metro Station Tehran BRT: BRT 2; Tehran Buses: List not completed; Andisheh City Buses: Andisheh-Azari; Baghestan City Buses: Baghestan(Nasirabad)-Azari; Shahriar City Buses: Shahriar-Azari
	Ahamadabad-e Mostowfi-Azadi	24.5	4000	Meydan-e Azadi Metro Station; Tehran Western Terminal Tehran BRT: BRT 1; BRT 2; BRT 10; Tehran Buses: 252 Azadi Term.-Shahrak-e Shahrdari; 253 Azadi Term.-Shahrak-e Daneshgah; 280 Azadi Term.-Kuhsar Term.; 288 Azadi Term.-San'at Sq.; 323 Azadi Term.-Shahrak-e Baqeri; 355 Azadi Term.-Haft-e Tir; 368 Azadi Term.-Seyyed Khandan; 369 Azadi Term.-Vanak Sq.; 374 Azadi Term.-Ebrahimabad Blvd.; 375 Azadi Term.- Yaftabad; 385 Azadi Term.-Shahrak-e Valiasr; 412 Azadi Term.-Khalij-e Fars Blvd.; 414 Azadi Term.-Shahrak-e Darya; 427 Azadi Term.-Shahr-e Aftab; 901 Azadi Term.-Tehranpars Int.; 902 Azadi Term.-Khavaran Term.; 910 Azadi Term.-IUST; Andisheh City Buses: Andisheh-Azadi; Andisheh-Azari; Andisheh-Karaj Metro-Chamran terminal; Baghestan City Buses: Nasirabad-Azadi; Nasirabad-Azari; Malard City Buses: Marlik-Azadi; Malard-Azadi; Shahriar City Buses: Shahriar-Azadi
	Firuz Bahram-Azadi	24	3500	Azadegan Metro Station; Meydan-e Azadi Metro Station; Tehran Western Terminal Tehran BRT: BRT 1; BRT 2; BRT 10; Tehran Buses: 252 Azadi Term.-Shahrak-e Shahrdari; 253 Azadi Term.-Shahrak-e Daneshgah; 280 Azadi Term.-Kuhsar Term.; 288 Azadi Term.-San'at Sq.; 323 Azadi Term.-Shahrak-e Baqeri; 355 Azadi Term.-Haft-e Tir; 368 Azadi Term.-Seyyed Khandan; 369 Azadi Term.-Vanak Sq.; 374 Azadi Term.-Ebrahimabad Blvd.; 375 Azadi Term.- Yaftabad; 385 Azadi Term.-Shahrak-e Valiasr; 412 Azadi Term.-Khalij-e Fars Blvd.; 414 Azadi Term.-Shahrak-e Darya; 427 Azadi Term.-Shahr-e Aftab; 901 Azadi Term.-Tehranpars Int.; 902 Azadi Term.-Khavaran Term.; 910 Azadi Term.-IUST; Andisheh City Buses: Andisheh-Azadi; Andisheh-Azari; Andisheh-Karaj Metro-Chamran terminal; Baghestan City Buses: Nasirabad-Azadi; Nasirabad-Azari; Malard City Buses: Marlik-Azadi; Malard-Azadi; Shahriar City Buses: Shahriar-Azadi
	Eslamshahr (Namaz Sq.)-Aderan	16.5	3500	
	Eslamshahr Azad Uni. (Namaz Sq.)- Chichaklu Azad Uni.	8	3000	
	Vavan-Azadi (Special)	31.5	5000	Azadegan Metro Station; Meydan-e Azadi Metro Station; Tehran Western Terminal Tehran BRT: BRT 1; BRT 2; BRT 10; Tehran Buses: 252 Azadi Term.-Shahrak-e Shahrdari; 253 Azadi Term.-Shahrak-e Daneshgah; 280 Azadi Term.-Kuhsar Term.; 288 Azadi Term.-San'at Sq.; 323 Azadi Term.-Shahrak-e Baqeri; 355 Azadi Term.-Haft-e Tir; 368 Azadi Term.-Seyyed Khandan; 369 Azadi Term.-Vanak Sq.; 374 Azadi Term.-Ebrahimabad Blvd.; 375 Azadi Term.- Yaftabad; 385 Azadi Term.-Shahrak-e Valiasr; 412 Azadi Term.-Khalij-e Fars Blvd.; 414 Azadi Term.-Shahrak-e Darya; 427 Azadi Term.-Shahr-e Aftab; 901 Azadi Term.-Tehranpars Int.; 902 Azadi Term.-Khavaran Term.; 910 Azadi Term.-IUST; Andisheh City Buses: Andisheh-Azadi; Andisheh-Azari; Andisheh-Karaj Metro-Chamran terminal; Baghestan City Buses: Nasirabad-Azadi; Nasirabad-Azari; Malard City Buses: Marlik-Azadi; Malard-Azadi; Shahriar City Buses: Shahriar-Azadi
	Vavan-Shahed (Special)	21.5	5000	Shahed - Bagher Shahr Metro Station Tehran Buses: List not completed
	Shahrak-e Emam Hosein-Azadi (Special)	25	4500	Azadegan Metro Station; Meydan-e Azadi Metro Station; Tehran Western Terminal Tehran BRT: BRT 1; BRT 2; BRT 10; Tehran Buses: 252 Azadi Term.-Shahrak-e Shahrdari; 253 Azadi Term.-Shahrak-e Daneshgah; 280 Azadi Term.-Kuhsar Term.; 288 Azadi Term.-San'at Sq.; 323 Azadi Term.-Shahrak-e Baqeri; 355 Azadi Term.-Haft-e Tir; 368 Azadi Term.-Seyyed Khandan; 369 Azadi Term.-Vanak Sq.; 374 Azadi Term.-Ebrahimabad Blvd.; 375 Azadi Term.- Yaftabad; 385 Azadi Term.-Shahrak-e Valiasr; 412 Azadi Term.-Khalij-e Fars Blvd.; 414 Azadi Term.-Shahrak-e Darya; 427 Azadi Term.-Shahr-e Aftab; 901 Azadi Term.-Tehranpars Int.; 902 Azadi Term.-Khavaran Term.; 910 Azadi Term.-IUST; Andisheh City Buses: Andisheh-Azadi; Andisheh-Azari; Andisheh-Karaj Metro-Chamran terminal; Baghestan City Buses: Nasirabad-Azadi; Nasirabad-Azari; Malard City Buses: Marlik-Azadi; Malard-Azadi; Shahriar City Buses: Shahriar-Azadi
