= Karaj Metro Station =

Station of the Tehran Metro

Karaj Metro Station ایستگاه مترو کرج
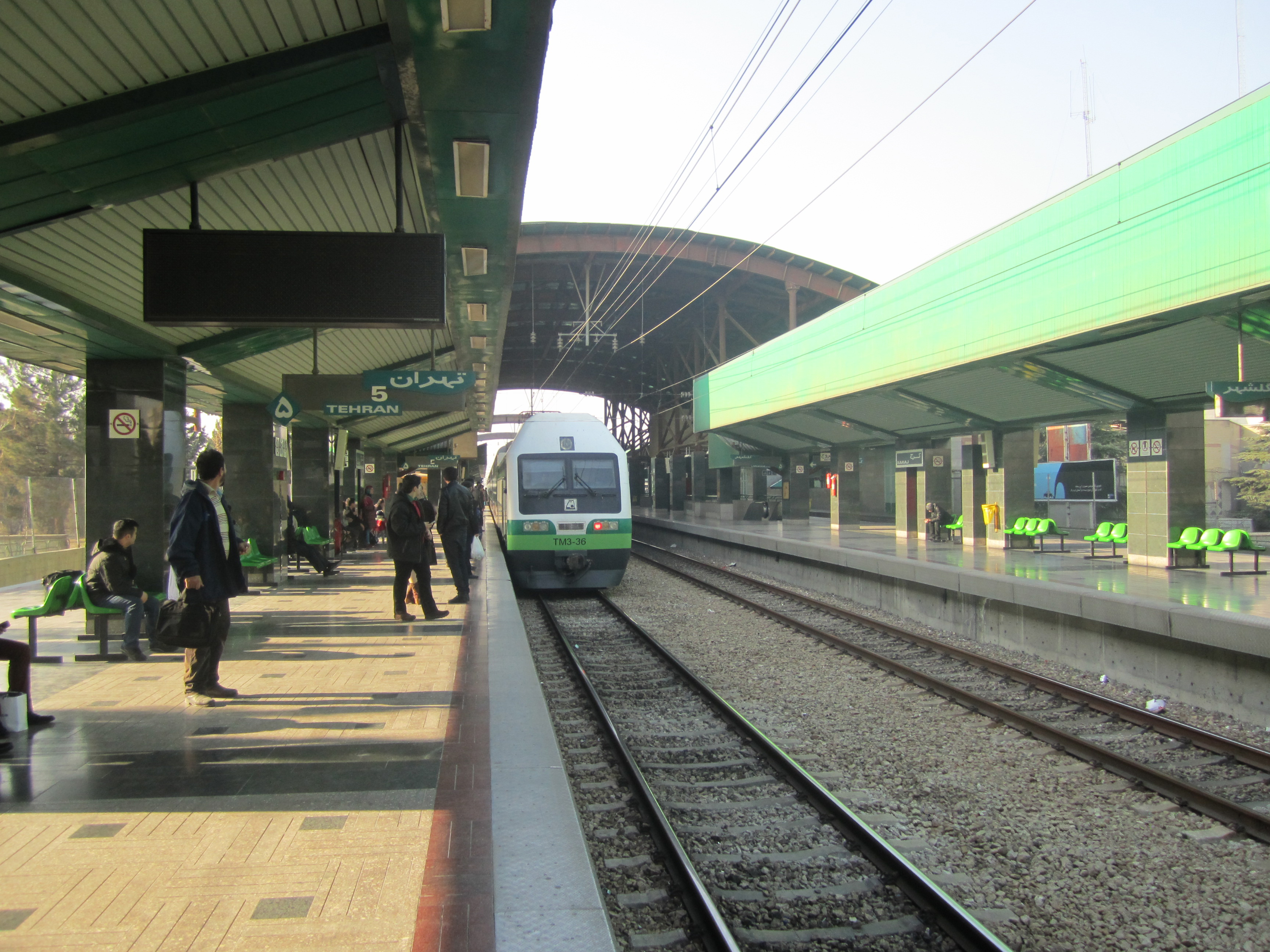

General information
- Location: Bahar-e Azadi Boulevard, District 2, Karaj, Karaj County; Alborz Province, Iran
- Coordinates: 35°47′12.86″N 51°0′10.79″E
- System: Karaj Metro Station
- Operator: Tehran Urban and Suburban Railways Organization (Metro)
- Platforms: Side Platform
- Connections: Shahid Soltani Bus Terminal Karaj City Buses: Fardis-Chamran; Soltani-Fardis; Soltani-Bonyad; Soltani-Be'sat; Soltani-Baghestan; Soltani-Hesarak-e Bala; Soltani-Owj; Soltani-Shahrak-e Taleghani; Soltani-Azad University; Chamran-Vahdat; Soltani-Hesarak (Express); Soltani-Hasanabad; Andisheh City Buses: Andisheh-Karaj Metro-Chamran; Malard City Buses: Malard-Karaj; Marlik-Karaj; Shahriar City Buses: Shahriar-Karaj

Construction
- Depth: Surface

History
- Opened: 1999 2025 (Karaj Metro Line 2)

Services
Preceding station	Tehran Metro	Following station
Mohammad Shahr (Mahdasht) towards Hashtgerd	Line 5	Atmosfer towards Tehran (Sadeghiyeh)
Location

Karaj (Shahid Soltani) Metro Station is a station in Tehran Metro Line 5. It is located in southeastern Karaj near Tehran-Qazvin Freeway. It is between Atmosfer Metro Station and Mahdasht Metro Station. The station is 1.8 km (1.1 mi) north of Karaj railway Station, which serves Tehran Commuter Railway.
