= Shahriar Municipality and Suburbs Bus Organization =

Shahriar Municipality and Suburbs Bus Organization سازمان اتوبوسرانی شهرداری شهریار و حومه
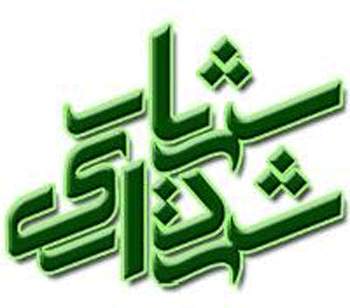
- Founded: 2002 (1381 H-SH)
- Headquarters: Shahriar 22 Bahman Bus Terminal
- Service area: Shahriar-Ferdowsieh-Sabashahr-Shahedshahr-Vahidieh, Shahriar County, Tehran Province; Iran
- Service type: Bus service
- Routes: 10 Routes
- Fleet: 146 (95 Active)
- Operator: Shahriar Municipality
- Chief executive: Faramarz Yusefi
- Website: سازمان اتوبوسرانی شهرداری شهریار و حومه

Shahriar Municipality and Suburbs Bus Organization (Persian: سازمان اتوبوسرانی شهرداری شهریار و حومه) is a public transport agency running Transit buses in Shahriar City and surrounding cities in Shahriar County in Tehran Province. The transit agency has one major bus terminal called Shahriar 22 Bahman Bus Terminal.

== List of routes ==
Colour	Name	Length (km)	Connections
	Shahriar-Azari	28.5	Tehran BRT: BRT 2; Tehran Buses: List not completed; Andisheh City Buses: Andisheh-Azari; Baghestan City Buses: Baghestan(Nasirabad)-Azari; Dehshahd-Shahriar; Eslamshahr City Buses: Mahdieh-Azari; Qa'emieh-Azari; Malard City Buses: Malard-Shahriar
	Shariar-Azadi	28	Meydan-e Azadi Metro Station; Tehran Western Terminal Tehran BRT: BRT 1; BRT 2; BRT 10; Tehran Buses: 252 Azadi Term.-Shahrak-e Shahrdari; 253 Azadi Term.-Shahrak-e Daneshgah; 280 Azadi Term.-Kuhsar Term.; 288 Azadi Term.-San'at Sq.; 323 Azadi Term.-Shahrak-e Baqeri; 355 Azadi Term.-Haft-e Tir; 368 Azadi Term.-Seyyed Khandan; 369 Azadi Term.-Vanak Sq.; 374 Azadi Term.-Ebrahimabad Blvd.; 375 Azadi Term.- Yaftabad; 385 Azadi Term.-Shahrak-e Valiasr; 412 Azadi Term.-Khalij-e Fars Blvd.; 414 Azadi Term.-Shahrak-e Darya; 427 Azadi Term.-Shahr-e Aftab; 901 Azadi Term.-Tehranpars Int.; 902 Azadi Term.-Khavaran Term.; 910 Azadi Term.-IUST; Andisheh City Buses: Andisheh-Azadi; Andisheh-Azari; Andisheh-Karaj Metro-Chamran terminal; Baghestan City Buses: Baghestan(Nasirabad)-Azadi; Dehshahd-Shahriar; Eslamshahr City Buses: Eslamshahr-Azadi; Ahmadabad-e Mostowfi-Azadi; Firuz Bahram-Azadi; Vavan-Azadi (Special); Shahrak-e Emam Hosein-Azadi (Special); Malard City Buses: Marlik-Azadi; Malard-Azadi; Malard-Shahriar
	Shahriar-Karaj	18	Karaj Metro Station; Shahid Soltani Bus Terminal Karaj City Buses: Fardis-Chamran; Soltani-Fardis; Soltani-Bonyad; Soltani-Be'sat; Soltani-Baghestan; Soltani-Hesarak-e Bala; Soltani-Owj; Soltani-Shahrak-e Taleghani; Soltani-Azad University; Chamran-Vahdat; Soltani-Hesarak (Express); Soltani-Hasanabad; Andisheh City Buses: Andisheh-Karaj Metro-Chamran terminal; Andisheh-Azadi; Andisheh-Azari; Baghestan City Buses: Dehshahd-Shahriar; Malard City Buses: Malard-Karaj; Marlik-Karaj; Malard-Shahriar; Marlik-Azadi; Sarasiab-Azadi; Sarasiab-Qods
	Shahriar-Andisheh	7	Andisheh City Buses: Andisheh-Karaj Metro-Chamran terminal; Andisheh-Azadi; Andisheh-Azari; Baghestan City Buses: Dehshahd-Shahriar; Malard City Buses: Malard-Karaj; Marlik-Karaj; Malard-Shahriar; Marlik-Azadi; Sarasiab-Azadi; Sarasiab-Qods
	Shahriar-Safadasht	22	Baghestan City Buses: Dehshahd-Shahriar; Malard City Buses: Malard-Karaj; Malard-Bidganeh; Malard-Qeshlaq
	Shahriar-Amirieh	6	Baghestan City Buses: Dehshahd-Shahriar; Malard City Buses: Malard-Shahriar
	Shahriar-Vahidieh	8	Baghestan City Buses: Dehshahd-Shahriar; Malard City Buses: Malard-Shahriar
	Shahriar-Ferdowsieh	8	Baghestan City Buses: Dehshahd-Shahriar; Malard City Buses: Malard-Shahriar
	Shahriar-Shahedshahr	12	Baghestan City Buses: Dehshahd-Shahriar; Malard City Buses: Malard-Shahriar
	Shahriar-Sabashahr	12	Baghestan City Buses: Dehshahd-Shahriar; Malard City Buses: Malard-Shahriar
