= Golshahr Metro Station =

Station of the Tehran Metro

Golshahr Metro Station ایستگاه مترو گلشهر
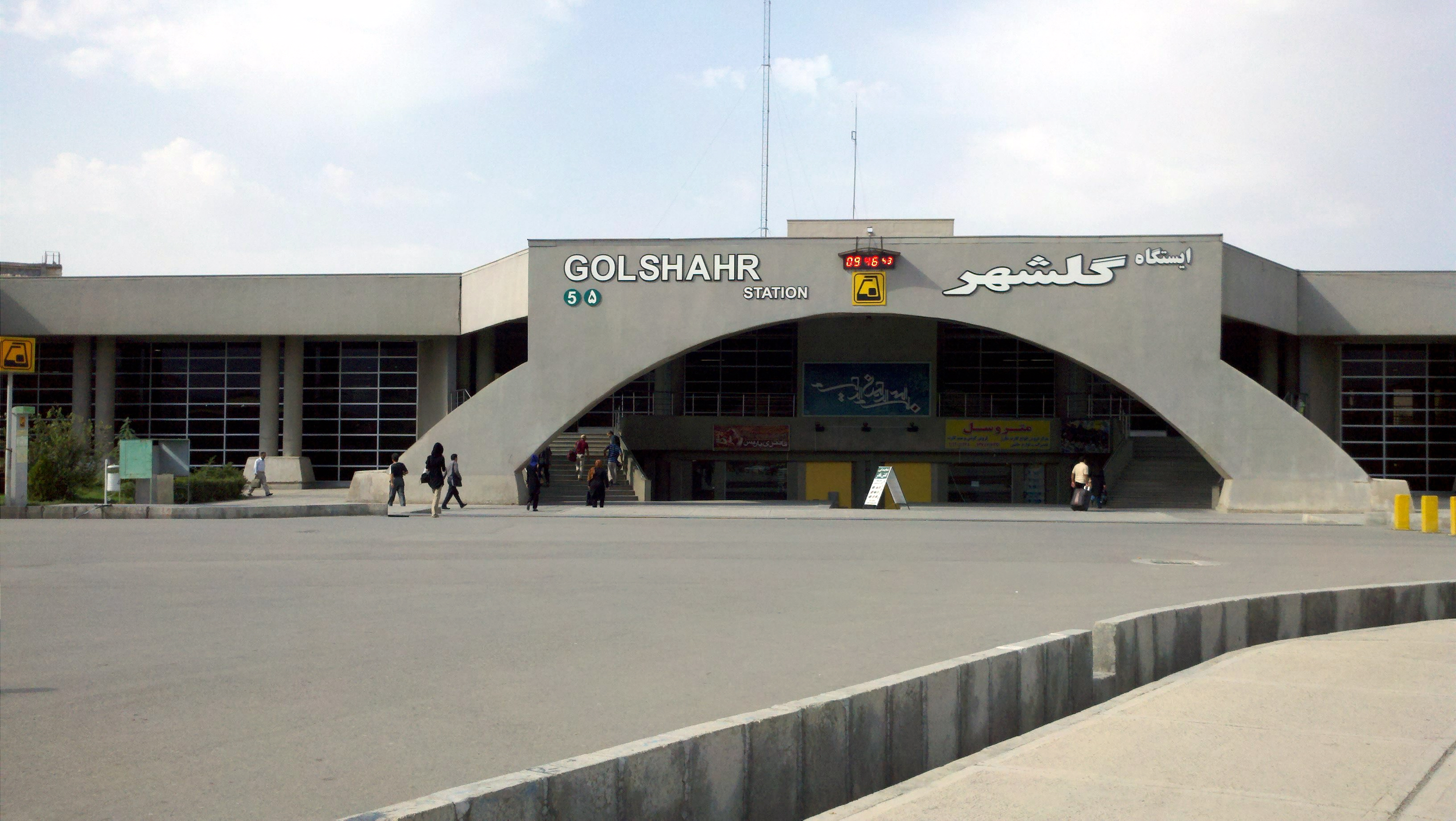

General information
- Location: Golzar Boulevard, District 5, Karaj, Karaj County; Alborz province, Iran
- Coordinates: 35.8250°N 50.9329°E
- System: Tehran Metro Station; Karaj Metro Station
- Operator: Tehran Urban and Suburban Railways Organization (Metro)
- Connections: Karaj City Buses: Emam Intersection-Phase 4; Golshahr-Kamalshahr; Golshahr-Baghestan; Golshahr-Rajaeishahr; Golshahr-Hashtgerd-e Jadid; Golshahr-Hashtgerd-e Qadim

Construction
- Depth: Surface

History
- Opened: 2004

Services
Preceding station	Tehran Metro	Following station
Shahid Fakhrizadeh (Mammut) towards Hashtgerd	Line 5	Mohammad Shahr (Mahdasht) towards Tehran (Sadeghiyeh)
Location

Golshahr Metro Station is the former western end of Tehran Metro Line 5. It is located in Mehrshahr in southwest of Karaj. In December 2019, Line 5 was extended further west beyond this station to Hashtgerd.

== List of services ==
- ATM bank
- Taxi station
- Supermarket
- Shrine
- Parking lot
- Bus terminal
- Escalator
- Payphone
- Toilet
- Snack bar
