= Meydan-e Azadi Metro Station =

Station of the Tehran Metro

Coordinates: 35.7008°N 51.3785°E

Meydan-e Azadi Metro Station ایستگاه مترو میدان آزادی
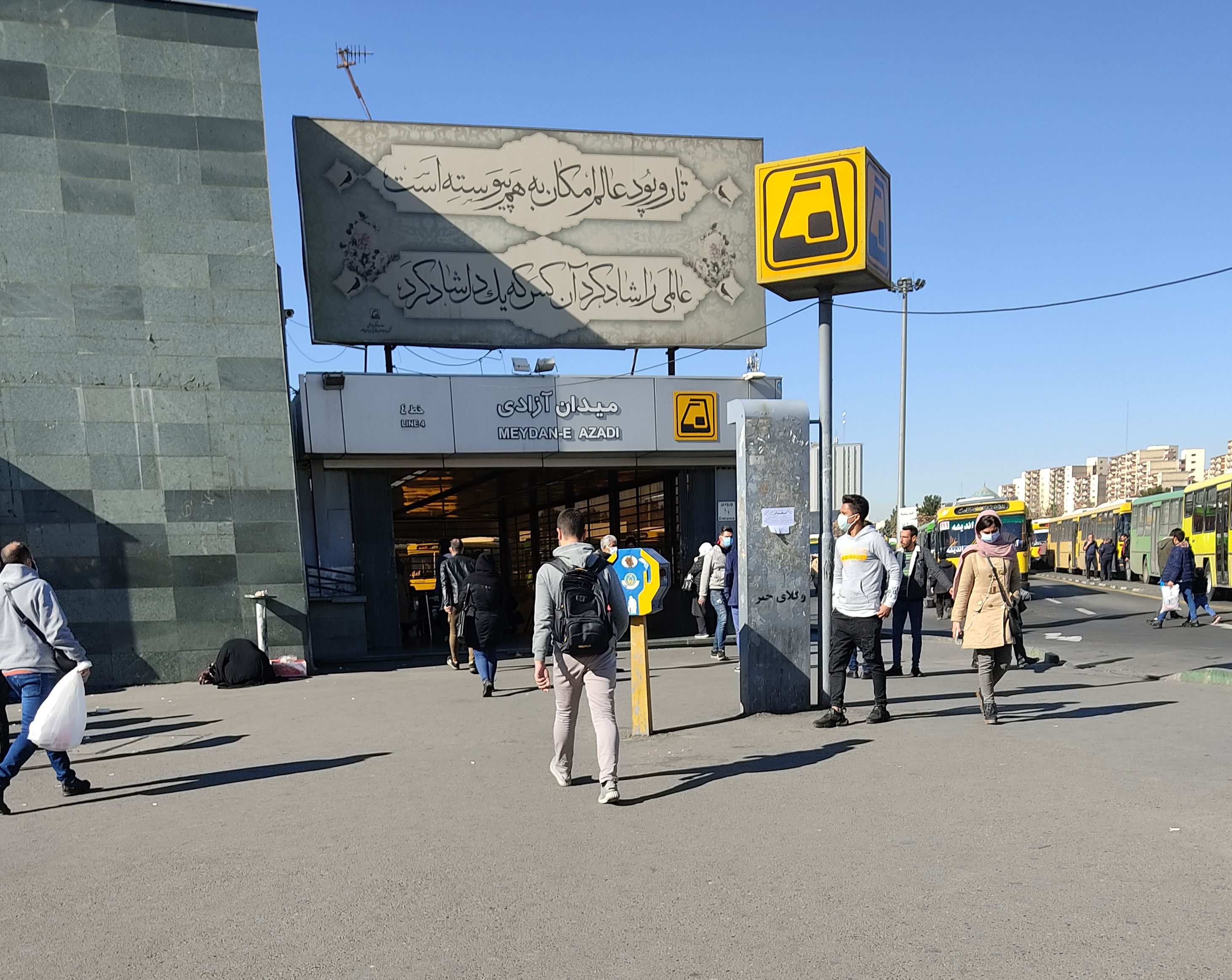
- Meydan-e Azadi Metro Station entrance - 2021

General information
- Location: Azadi Square, Districts 2-5-9, Tehran; Tehran Province, Iran
- System: Tehran Metro Station
- Operator: Tehran Urban and Suburban Railways Organization (Metro)
- Platforms: Side Platform
- Connections: Azadi Bus Terminal Tehran Buses: Tehran BRT; BRT 1; BRT 2; BRT 10; Tehran City Buses; 252 Azadi Term.-Shahrak-e Shahrdari; 253 Azadi Term.-Shahrak-e Daneshgah; 280 Azadi Term.-Kuhsar Term.; 288 Azadi Term.-San'at Sq.; 323 Azadi Term.-Shahrak-e Baqeri; 355 Azadi Term.-Haft-e Tir; 368 Azadi Term.-Seyyed Khandan; 369 Azadi Term.-Vanak Sq.; 370 Airport-Vanak Sq.; 374 Azadi Term.-Ebrahimabad Blvd.; 375 Azadi Term.- Yaftabad; 385 Azadi Term.-Shahrak-e Valiasr; 412 Azadi Term.-Khalij-e Fars Blvd.; 414 Azadi Term.-Shahrak-e Darya; 427 Azadi Term.-Shahr-e Aftab; 901 Azadi Term.-Tehranpars Int.; 902 Azadi Term.-Khavaran Term.; 910 Azadi Term.-IUST; Andisheh City Buses: Andisheh-Azadi; Andisheh-Azari; Baghestan City Buses: Nasirabad-Azadi; Nasirabad-Azari; Eslamshahr City Buses: Eslamshahr-Azadi; Ahmadabad-e Mostowfi-Azadi; Firuz Bahram-Azadi; Vavan-Azadi (Special); Shahrak-e Emam Hosein-Azadi (Special); Malard City Buses: Marlik-Azadi; Malard-Azadi; Shahriar City Buses: Shahriar-Azadi

History
- Opened: 1389 H-Kh (2010)

Services
Preceding station	Tehran Metro	Following station
Bimeh towards Allameh Jafari	Line 4	Ostad Moein towards Shahid Kolahdooz
Location

Meydan-e Azadi Metro Station is the sixteenth station of the Tehran Metro Line 4 and is located in Azadi Square, Shaheed Baradaran Rahmani Highway, between Ostad Moein and before Bimeh.

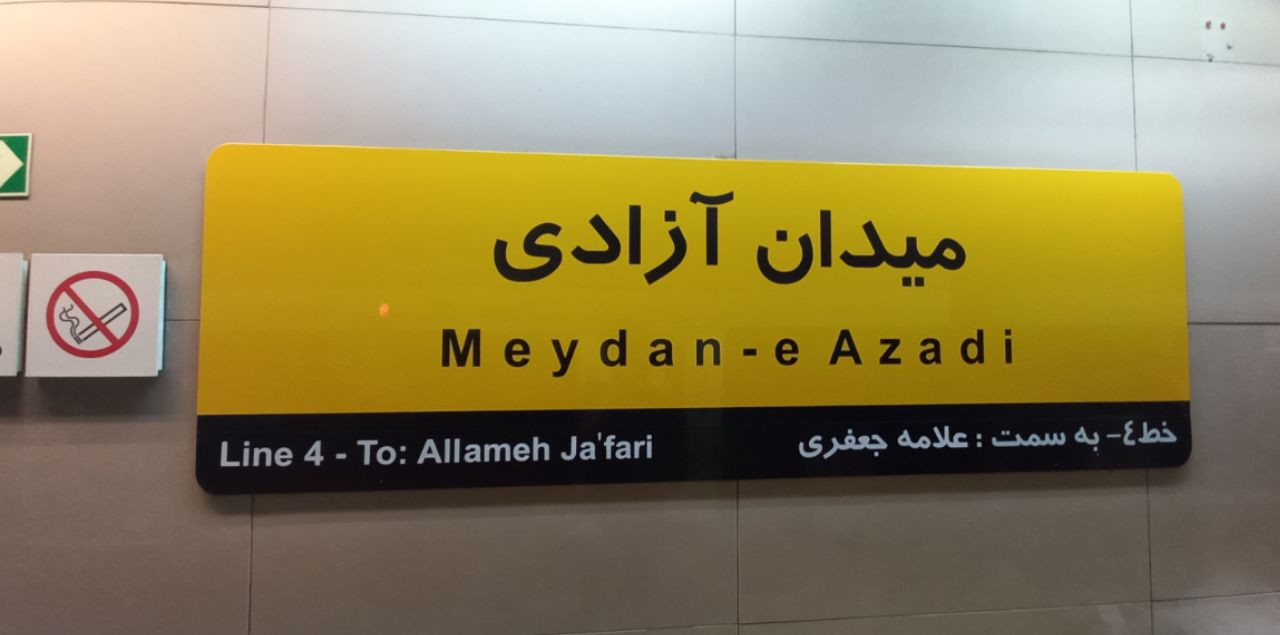
