= Mohammad Shahr (Mahdasht) Metro Station =

Station of the Tehran Metro

Mohammad Shahr Metro Station ایستگاه مترو محمدشهر
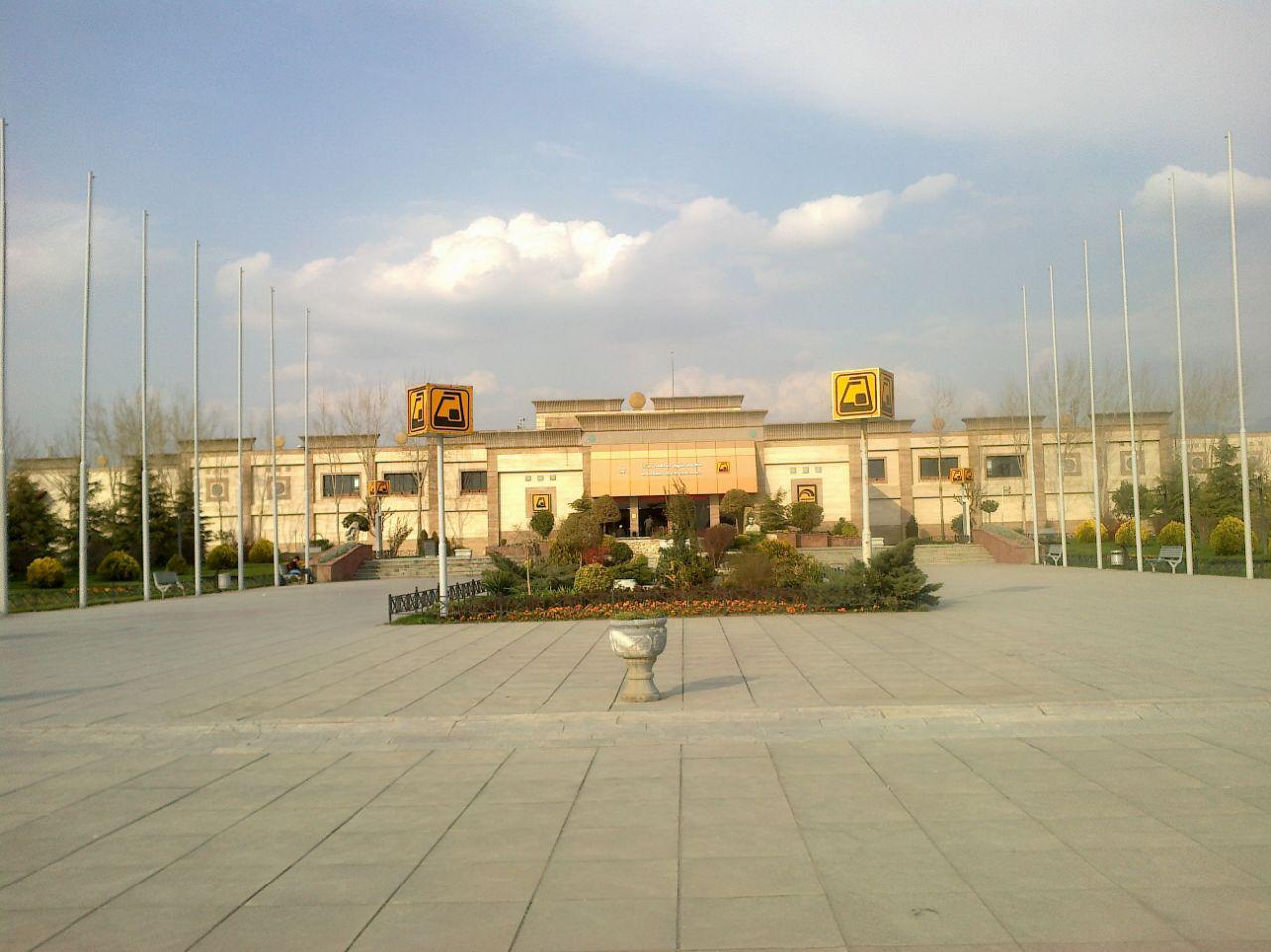
- Mahdasht Metro Station, March 2015

General information
- Location: Mahdasht Road, District 2, Karaj, Karaj County; Alborz Province, Iran
- Coordinates: 35.8022°N 50.9649°E
- System: Tehran Metro Station; Karaj Metro Station
- Operator: Tehran Urban and Suburban Railways Organization (Metro)
- Connections: Alborz Bus Terminal Karaj City Buses: Alborz-Mahdasht; Alborz-Valadabad; Alborz-Abbasabad-Safadasht; Alborz-Eshtehard; Alborz-Mohammadshahr

Construction
- Parking: There is parking lot for personnel.

Other information
- Website: http://metro.tehran.ir/

History
- Opened: 2010

Services
| Preceding station | Tehran Metro | Following station |
|---|---|---|
| Golshahr towards Hashtgerd | Line 5 | Karaj towards Tehran (Sadeghiyeh) |

Other services
Location

Mohammad Shahr Metro Station, formerly known as Mahdasht Metro Station is a station in Tehran Metro Line 5. It is located in southern Karaj. It is between Karaj Metro Station and Golshahr Metro Station.
