= Atmosfer Metro Station =

Station of the Tehran Metro

Atmosfer Metro Station ایستگاه مترو اتمسفر

General information
- Location: Lashkari Expressway, Garmdarreh RD, Karaj County; Alborz Province, Iran
- Coordinates: 35.7516°N 51.0817°E
- System: Tehran Metro Station; Karaj Metro Station
- Operator: Tehran Urban and Suburban Railways Organization (Metro)
- Connections: Karaj City Buses: Golkar Terminal-Garmdarreh

Construction
- Structure type: Surface

History
- Opened: 2006

Services
Preceding station	Tehran Metro	Following station
Karaj towards Hashtgerd	Line 5	Garmdarreh towards Tehran (Sadeghiyeh)
Location

Atmosfer (Atmosphere) Metro Station, formerly called Alborz Metro Station is a station in Tehran Metro Line 5. It is located north of Lashkari Expressway and near Atmosfer Factory. It is between Garmdarreh Metro Station and Karaj Metro Station.
