= Garmdarreh Metro Station =

Station of the Tehran Metro

Garmdarreh Metro Station ایستگاه مترو گرمدره

General information
- Location: Garmdarreh, Karaj County; Alborz Province, Iran
- Coordinates: 35.7516°N 51.0817°E
- System: Tehran Metro Station; Karaj Metro Station
- Operator: Tehran Urban and Suburban Railways Organization (Metro)

History
- Opened: 2017

Services
Preceding station	Tehran Metro	Following station
Atmosfer towards Hashtgerd	Line 5	Vardavard towards Tehran (Sadeghiyeh)
Location

Garmdarreh Metro Station is a station in Tehran Metro Line 5. It is located north of Tehran-Karaj Freeway and near Garmdare Park. It is between Vardavard Metro Station and Atmosfer Metro Station. For a long time the station was not operational due to the pending construction of access-road. It began operation on February 18, 2017.
