= Khadamabad =

Khadamabad (Persian: خادم اباد) may refer to:

- Khadamabad, Iran
- Khadamabad, Kohgiluyeh and Boyer-Ahmad, Iran
- Khadamabad, Pakistan
