= Karaj Metro =

Rapid transit system in Karaj, Iran

Karaj Metro متروی کرج

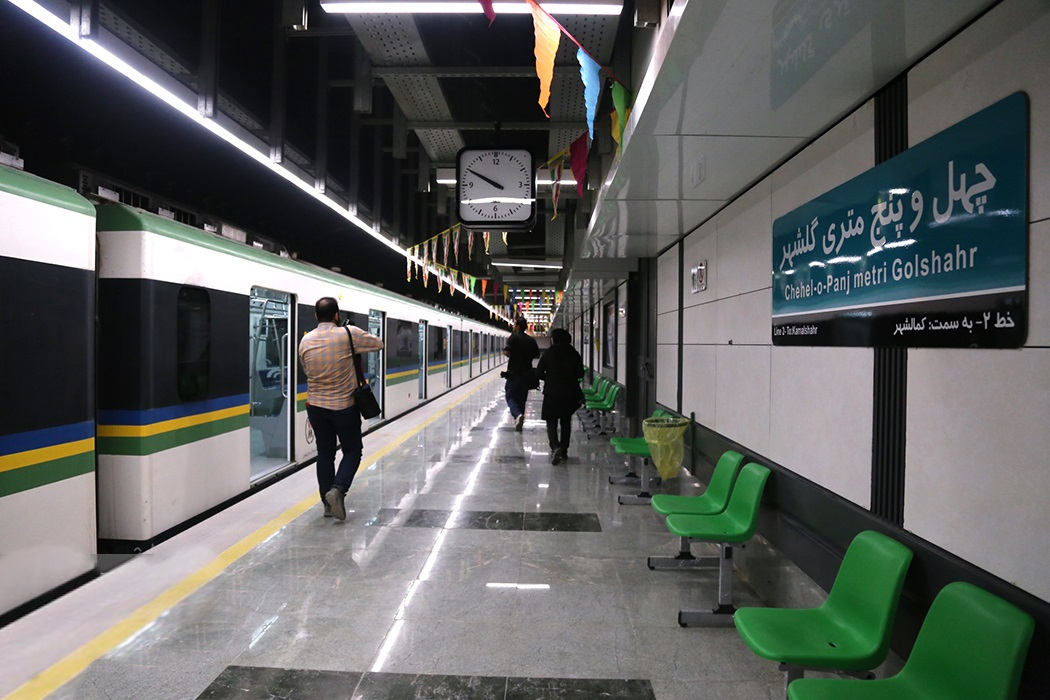

Overview
- Owner: Karaj Municipality
- Locale: Karaj, Iran
- Transit type: Rapid transit
- Number of lines: 2 (6 planned)
- Number of stations: 11
- Website: metro.karaj.ir

Operation
- Began operation: March 7, 1999 (line 1); February 27, 2023; 3 years ago (line 2)
- Operators: Karaj Urban and Suburban Railway Organization

Technical
- System length: 55 km (34.2 mi)
- Track gauge: 1,435 mm (4 ft 8 1/2 in) standard gauge
System map
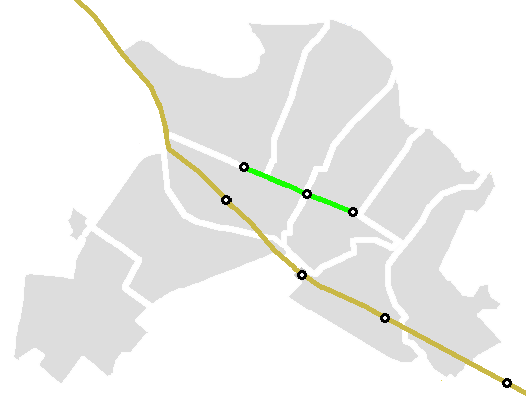

Karaj Metro is a rapid transit system serving the city of Karaj, Iran. This system has 2 operating lines with 11 working stations. The planned system will include 6 lines and 85 stations.

Line 1 with 7 stations is an extension and a part of Tehran Metro Line 5 with 7 operating stations in 43 km (26.7 mi), connecting Hashtgerd to Garmdarreh. Line 2 opened partially on 27 February 2023 with 2 stations in 6.5 km (4.0 mi), later that year another station was added, making the total stations of this line, 3. This line currently connects Golshahr boulevard to Taleghani boulevard, but is planned to connect Kamalshahr to Malard.

== Lines ==
Karaj 6 lines information
Line	Line Route	Length	Stations
1	Germdareh – new city of Mehestan	43 km (26.7 mi)	7
2	Kamalshahr–Mallard	27 km (16 mi)	24
3	Karaj–Azimiyeh	14 km (9 mi)	13
4	Baghestan – Karaj (Payam) Airport	18 km (11.1 mi)	19
5	Shahid Moazen Boulevard – Mohamadshahr	12 km (7.5 mi)	10
6	Esteghlal Boulevard – Shahid Soltani Square	9 km (6 mi)	12
Total:		97 km (60 mi)	85

=== Line 1 ===
Line 1 is a suburban rail line that consists of 7 stations.

Station	Connections	Condition	Began operation
Garmdarreh		Active	2017
Atmosfer		Active	2006
Karaj (Shahid Soltani)		Active	1999
Mohammad Shahr		Active	2010
Golshahr		Active	2004
Shahid Fakhrizadeh (Mammut)		Active	2023
Shahid Sepahbod Qasem Soleimani		Active	2019

=== Line 2 ===
Line 2 consists of 24 (4 active) stations.

Station	Connections	Condition	Began operation
Kamalshahr		Under construction	
Khorramdasht		Under construction	
Daneshgah-e Kharazmi		Under construction	
Khiaban-e Azadi		Under construction	
Moasseseh Seromsazi		Under construction	
Chehel-o-Panj metri Golshahr		Active	2023
Mianjaddeh		Under construction	
Dehghan vila		Under construction	
Rajaei Shahr		Active	2023
Meydan-e Ajorloo		Under construction	
Ayatollah Taleghani		Active	2023
Chaharrah-e Haft-e Tir		Under construction	
Chaharrah-e Mesbah		Under construction	
Meydan-e Emam Hossein		Under construction	
Karaj (Shahid Soltani)		Active	2025
Sarhadabad		Under construction	
Anbar-e Naft		Under construction	
Manzarieh		Under construction	
Niroogah-e Montazer Ghaem		Under construction	
Bazar-e Khodro		Under construction	
Kanal		Under construction	
13-e Sharghi		Under construction	
Serah-e Andisheh		Under construction	
Shahr-e Malard		Under construction	

== See also ==
- Transport in Karaj
