= Ostad Moein Metro Station =

Station of the Tehran Metro

Coordinates: 35.7008°N 51.3785°E

Ostad Moein Metro Station ایستگاه مترو استاد معین
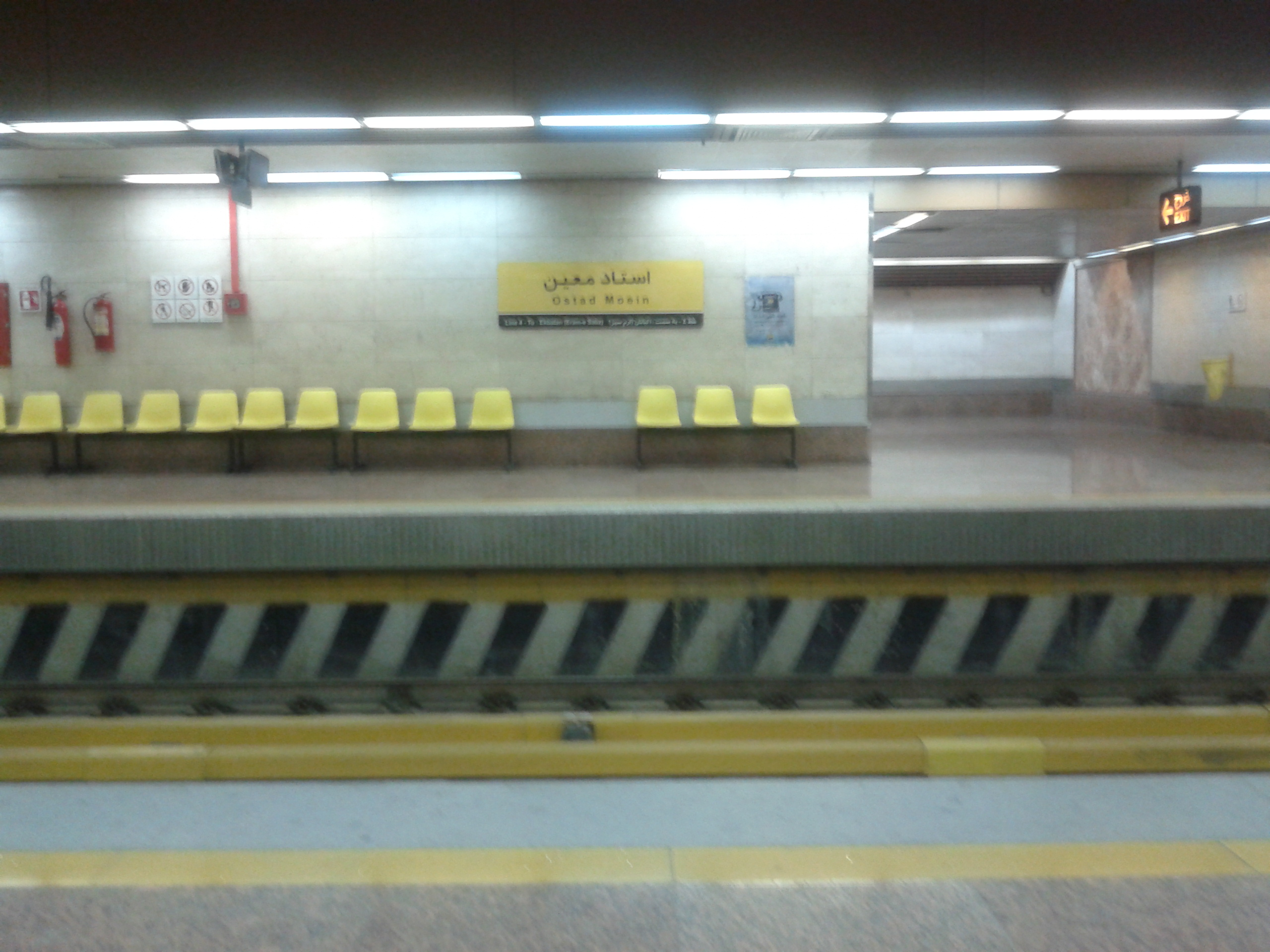

General information
- Location: Azadi Street, Districts 2-9, Tehran; Tehran Province, Iran
- System: Tehran Metro Station
- Operator: Tehran Urban and Suburban Railways Organization (Metro)
- Platforms: Side Platform

History
- Opened: 1390 H-Kh (2011)

Services
Preceding station	Tehran Metro	Following station
Meydan-e Azadi towards Allameh Jafari	Line 4	Doctor Habib-o-llah towards Shahid Kolahdooz
Location

Ostad Moein Station is a station of Tehran Metro Line 4. It is located in Azadi street before Azadi square on junction with Nourbaksh street.
