= Andisheh =

City in Tehran province, Iran

Andisheh Persian: اندیشه
- City
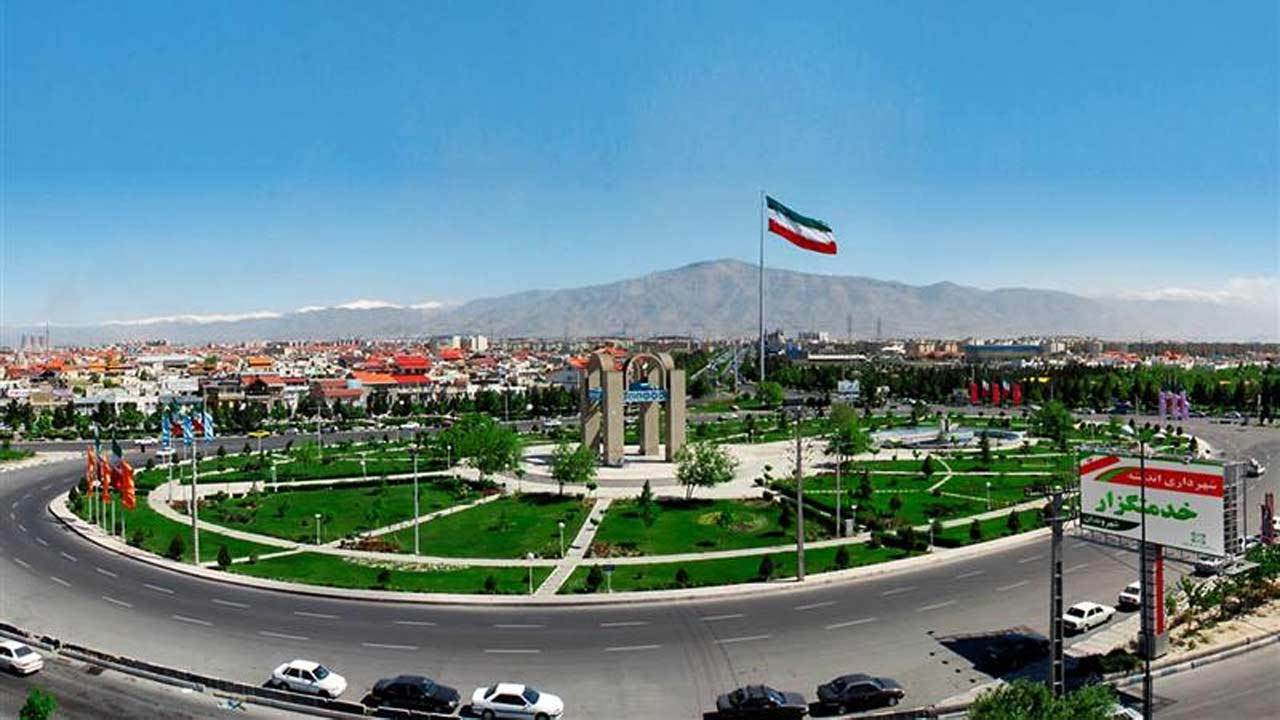
- Andisheh's Freedom Square

- Location within Iran
- Coordinates: 35°42′16″N 51°01′32″E
- Country: Iran
- Province: Tehran
- County: Shahriar
- District: Central

Population (2016)
  - Total: 116,062
- Time zone: UTC+3:30 (IRST)

Andisheh (Persian: اندیشه) (Note: Also romanized as Andīsheh) is a city in the Central District of Shahriar County, Tehran province, Iran. It is a new, planned city, located 30 kilometres (19 mi) from Tehran, northwest of Shahriar, and southeast of Karaj.

== Demographics ==
=== Population ===
The number of people who settled in this new settlement city in 2000 was 31,650, and the number is expected to reach 50,000 by the end of the "Third Plan". Andisheh has a full capacity of 150,000 residents.

At the time of the 2006 National Census, the city's population was 75,596 in 19,945 households. The following census in 2011 counted 96,807 people in 28,035 households. The 2016 census measured the population of the city as 116,062 people in 35,572 households.

== Overview ==
Shahr Andisheh consists of 6 phases starting from phase 1 to phase 6. Phase 1 is in the south of Andisheh area and phase 6 is in the north of Andisheh city. Phases 2 and 3 are opposite each other and phases 4 and 5 are adjacent to each other.

It can be said that phase 6 is Uptown Andishe, but this area is not yet completed.

Phase 3 is also one of the special neighborhoods in Andisheh city. The houses of this phase are mostly villas and the atmosphere is much calmer than the other phases.

The Iranian-Islamic market of Andisheh, which is built in the style of Naqsh Jahan square of Isfahan, is one of its biggest commercial and entertainment places.

== Transportation ==
The city is served by buses from the municipal-run Andisheh Municipality and Suburbs Bus Organization, connecting the city to Tehran and Karaj.

== Gallery ==
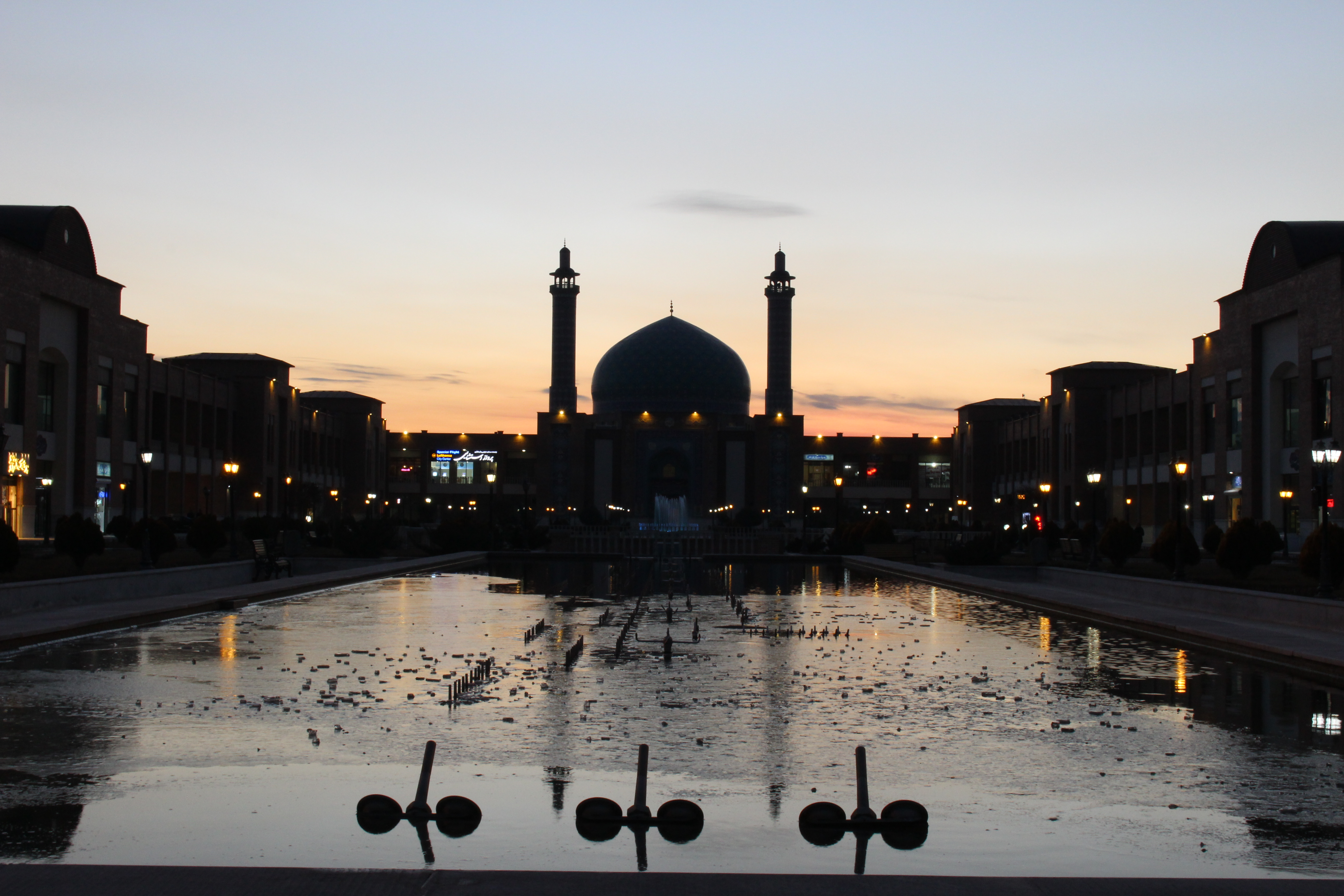

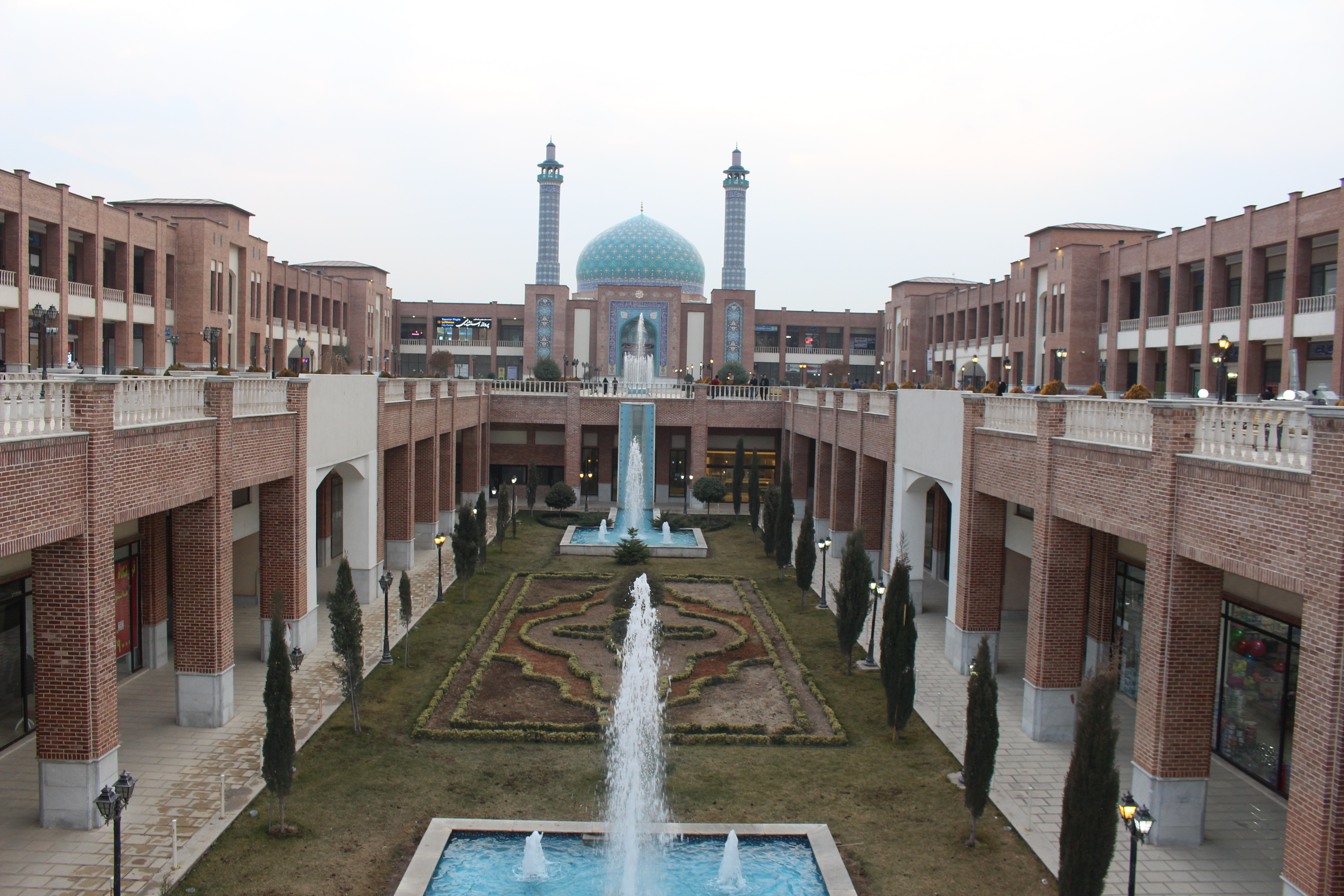

== See also ==
Media related to Andisheh at Wikimedia Commons
