= Baghestan =

City in Tehran province, Iran

Baghestan Persian: باغستان
- City
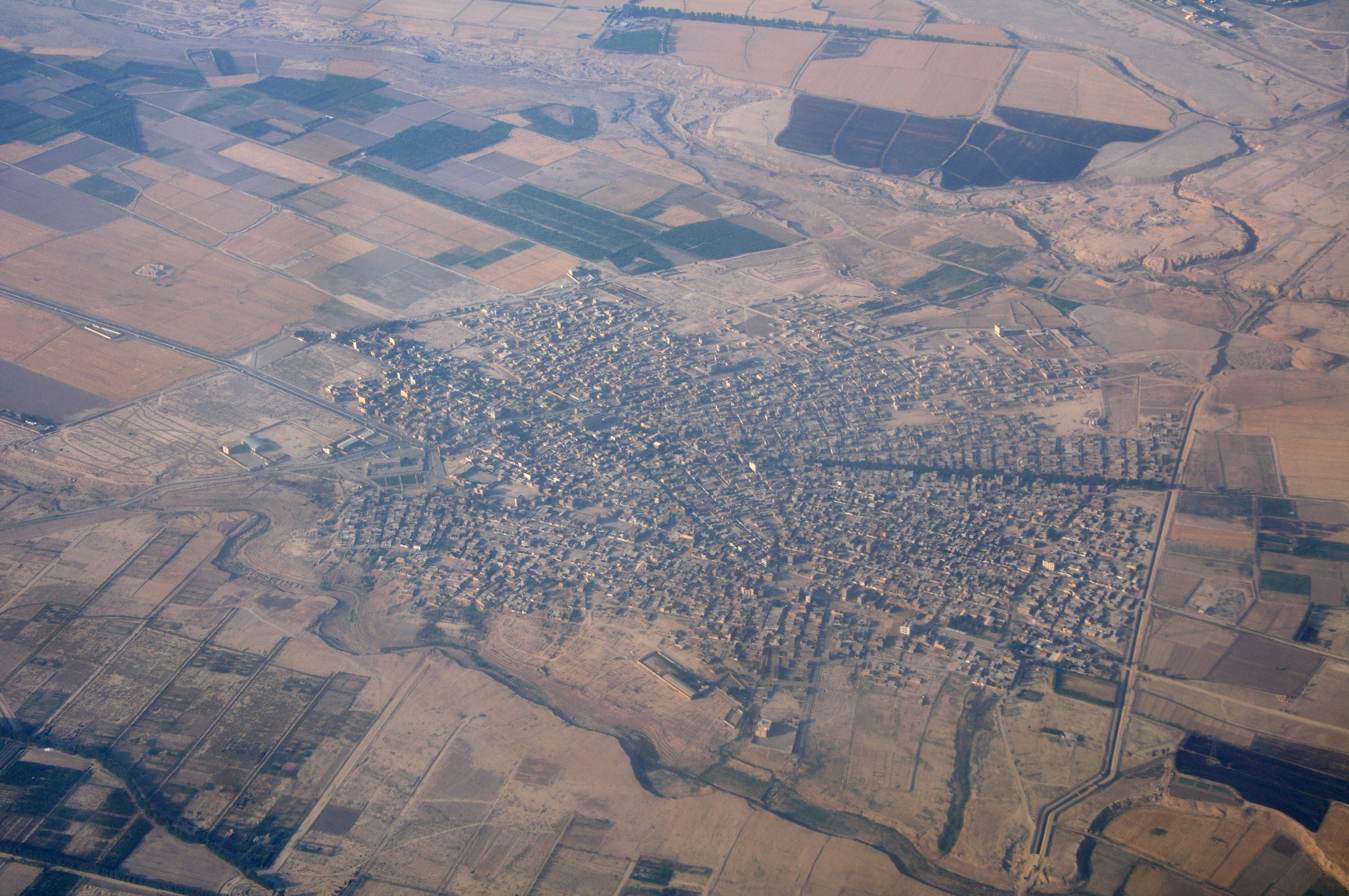
- Nasirabad Shahriar, District 1, Baghestan

- Location within Iran
- Coordinates: 35°38′07″N 51°08′10″E
- Country: Iran
- Province: Tehran
- County: Shahriar
- District: Central
- Established as a city: 2004

Population (2016)
  - Total: 83,934
- Time zone: UTC+3:30 (IRST)

Baghestan (Persian: باغستان) (Note: Formerly Khademabad (خادم آباد), also romanized as Khādamābād and Khādemābād; also known as Khādemābād-e Qods and Muslemabad) is a city in the Central District of Shahriar County, Tehran province, Iran. In 2004, the village of Khademabad-e Qods (خادم‌آباد قدس) merged with the villages of Deh-e Mavizeh (ده مویزه), Sadeqiyeh (صادقیه‌), Nasirabad (نصیرآباد), and Shahrak-e Motahari (شهرک مطهری) (Kavasiyeh [کاوسیه‌]) to form the city of Baghestan. After the 2016 National Census, the village of Baba Salman was annexed by the city.

== Demographics ==
=== Population ===
At the time of the 2006 census, the city's population was 52,330 in 12,810 households. The following census in 2011 counted 71,861 people in 19,306 households. The 2016 census measured the population of the city as 83,934 people in 23,787 households.

== Transportation ==
The city is served by buses from the municipal-run Baghestan City and Suburbs Bus Organization, connecting the city to Shahriar and Tehran.
