= Saidi Expressway =

Expressway in Tehran, Iran

Ayatollah Sa'idi Expressway
- بزرگراه آیت الله سعیدی
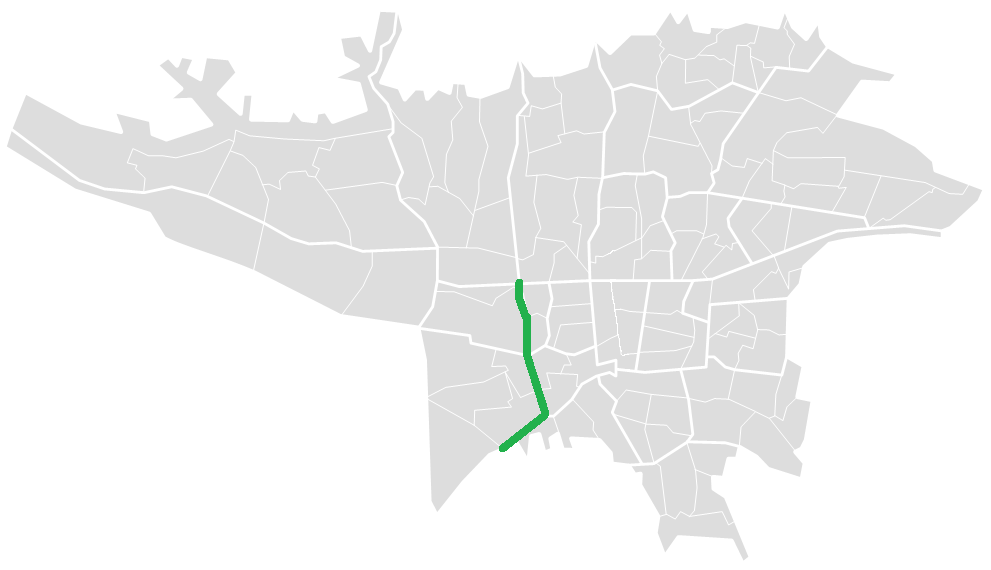

Route information
- Length: 10.5 km (6.5 mi)

Major junctions
- North end: Azadi Square
- South end: Saveh Road; Azadegan Expressway

Location
- Country: Iran
- Major cities: Tehran

Highway system
- Highways in Iran; Freeways

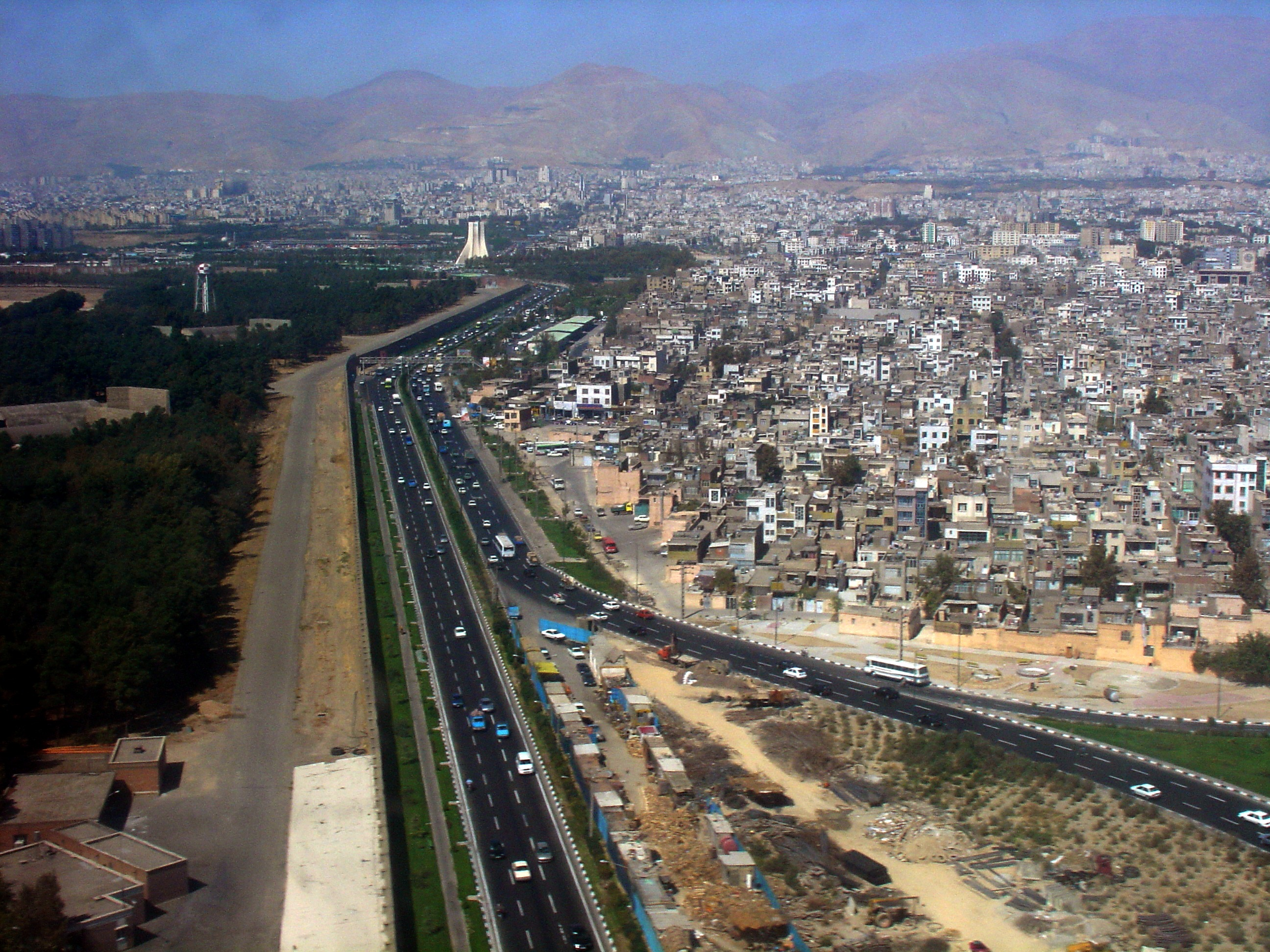

Saidi Expressway is an expressway in western Tehran. It starts from Azadi Square and passes Fath Square, Qazvin Street, Yaftabad Street and Zam-zam Square. Then it goes to southwest towards Azadegan Expressway and Saveh Road.

From North to South
Azadi Square	Mohammad Ali Jenah Expressway; Karaj special Road; Azadi Street
Tehran BRT Line Azadi Square Station
	Dampezeshki Street
	Hashemi Street
Tehran BRT Line Hashemi Street Station
Fath Square	Fath Expressway
Tehran BRT Line 30 Metri Jey Street Station
	30 Metri Jey Street
	Jorjani Street
Tehran BRT Line Jorjani Street Station
	Qazvin Street
	45 metri Zarand Boulevard
	Yaftabad Street; Moallem Boulevard
	Peyghambari Street
	Baradaran-e Bahrami Street
Zam-zam Square	Niruye Havaei Expressway; Kazemi Expressway
U-Turn
	Saveh Road; Azadegan Expressway
From South to North

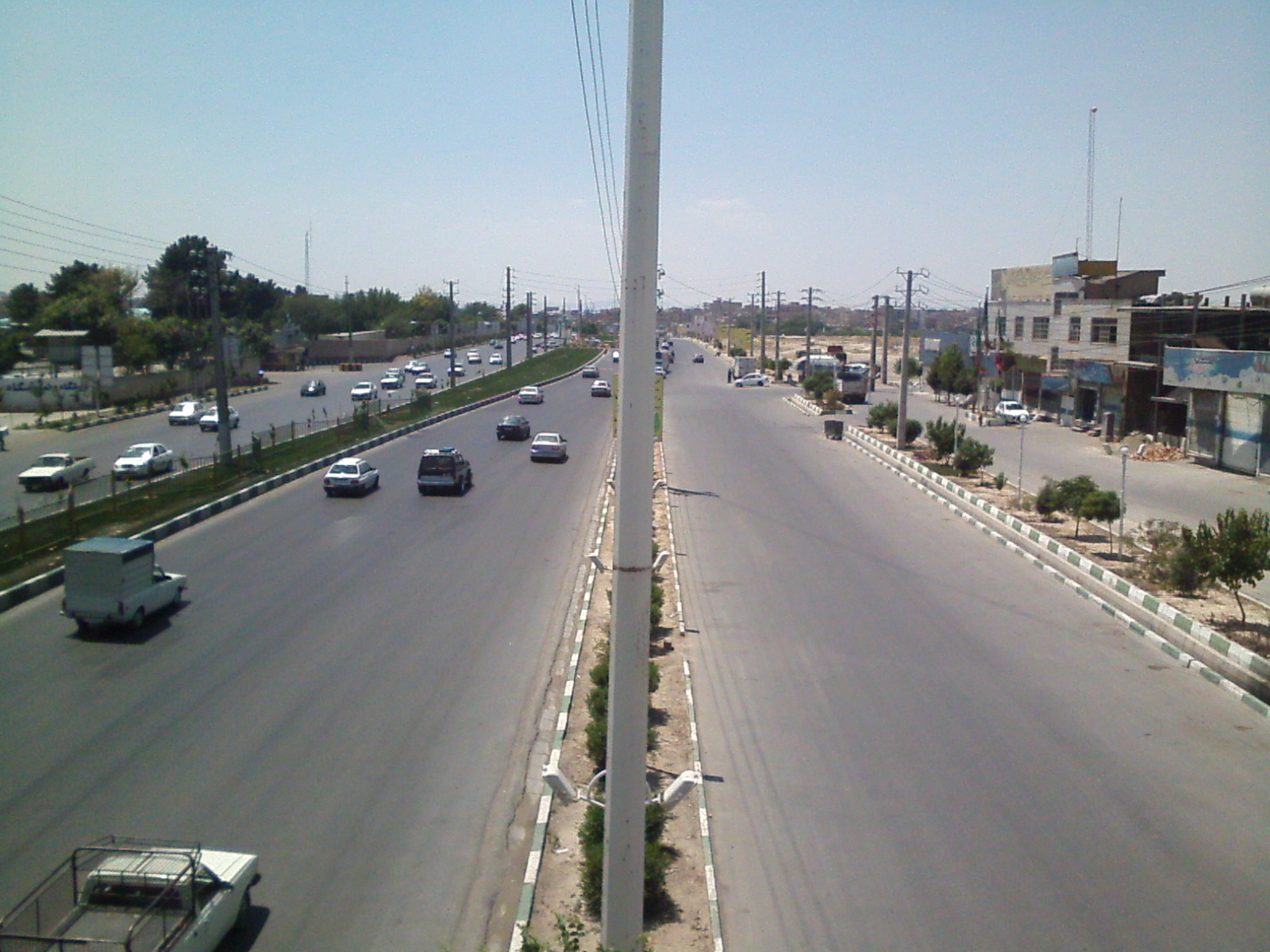

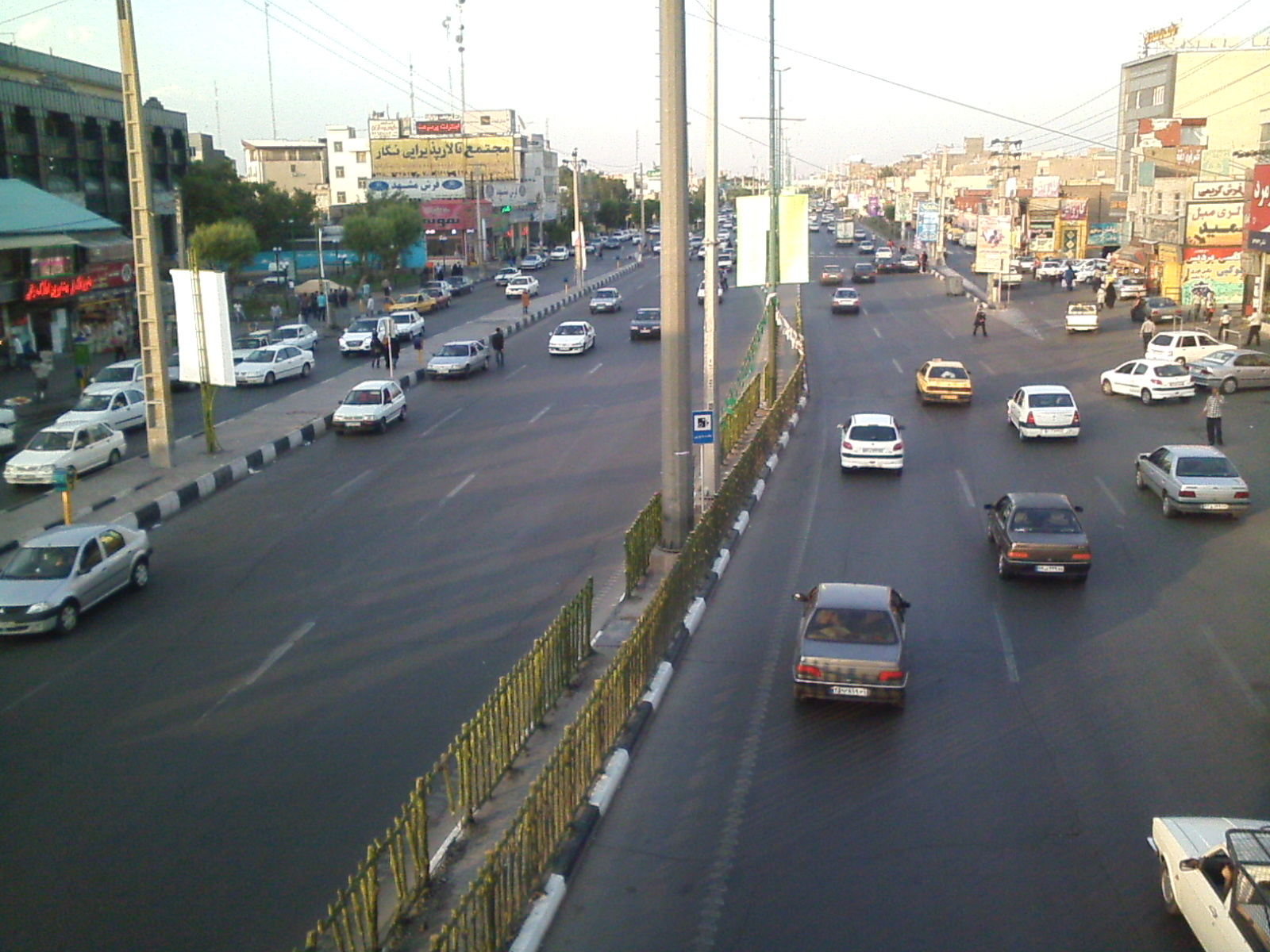
