= Baba Salman =

Neighborhood in Tehran province, Iran

Baba Salman Persian: باباسلمان
- Neighborhood
- Location within Iran
- Coordinates: 35°39′50″N 51°06′53″E
- Country: Iran
- Province: Tehran
- County: Shahriar
- District: Central
- City: Baghestan

Population (2016)
  - Total: 4,859
- Time zone: UTC+3:30 (IRST)

Baba Salman (Persian: باباسلمان) (Note: Also romanized as Bā Bā Salmān and Bābā Salmān; also known as ‘Eşmatābād) is a neighborhood in the city of Baghestan in the Central District of Shahriar County, Tehran province, Iran.

== Demographics ==
=== Population ===
At the time of the 2006 National Census, Baba Salman's population was 5,057 in 1,204 households, when it was a village in Maviz Rural District. The following census in 2011 counted 5,194 people in 1,323 households. The 2016 census measured the population of the village as 4,859 people in 1,310 households. It was the most populous village in its rural district.

After the census, Baba Salman merged with the city of Baghestan.
