= Shahriar, Tehran province =

City in Tehran province, Iran

Shahriar Persian: شهريار
- City
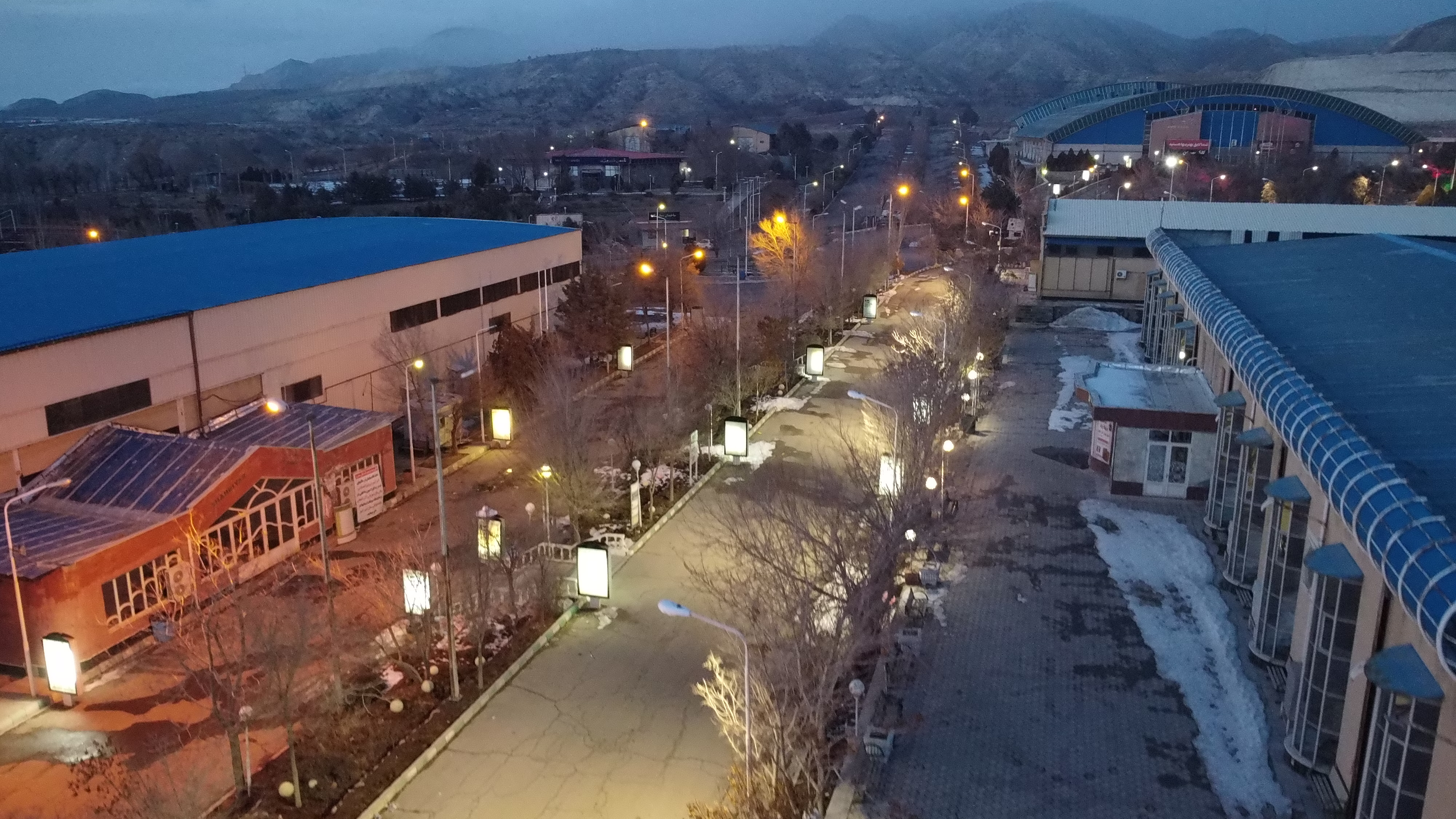
- Shahriar Hall in the city of Shahriar

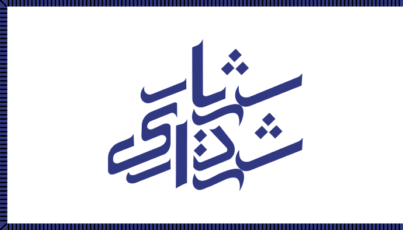
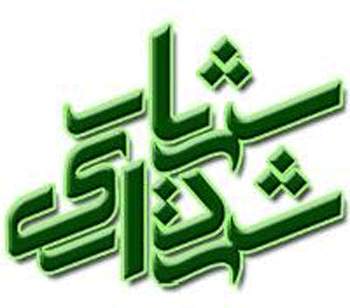
- Flag Seal

- Location within Iran
- Coordinates: 35°39′11″N 51°03′36″E
- Country: Iran
- Province: Tehran
- County: Shahriar
- District: Central

Population (2016)
  - Total: 309,607
- Time zone: UTC+3:30 (IRST)

Shahriar (Persian: شهريار; Persian pronunciation) (Note: Also romanized as Shahriār and Shahriyār) is a city in the Central District of Shahriar County, Tehran province, Iran, serving as capital of both the county and the district.

== History ==
The Municipality of Shahriar was established in 1953, in which the population of the city was 5,000.

On 8 January 2020, Ukraine International Airlines Flight 752 was shot down near the city, killing all 176 people on board.

== Demographics ==
=== Population ===
At the time of the 2006 National Census, the city's population was 189,120 in 24,039 households. The following census in 2011 counted 249,473 people in 75,014 households. The 2016 census measured the population of the city as 309,607 people in 97,570 households.

== Transportation ==
The city is served by buses from the municipal-run Shahriar Municipality and Suburbs Bus Organization, connecting the city to Tehran and Karaj, while also serving a group of smaller surrounding towns.

== See also ==
Media related to Shahriar at Wikimedia Commons
