= Baghestan City and Suburbs Bus Organization =

Iranian bus transit agency

Baghestan City and Suburbs Bus Organization سازمان اتوبوسرانی شهر باغستان و حومه
- Service area: Baghestan, Shahriar County, Tehran Province; Iran
- Service type: Bus service
- Routes: 3 Routes
- Operator: Baghestan Municipality
- Website: سازمان اتوبوسرانی شهر باغستان و حومه

Baghestan City and Suburbs Bus Organization (Persian: سازمان اتوبوسرانی شهر باغستان و حومه) is a public transport agency running Transit buses in Baghestan and surrounding areas in Tehran Province.

== List of routes ==
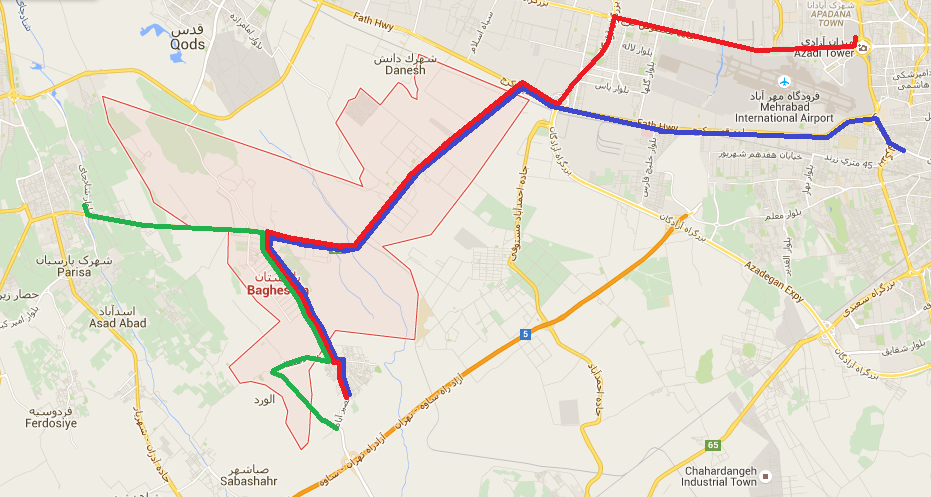

Colour	Name
	Baghestan (Nasirabad)-Azadi
	Baghestan (Nasirabad)-Azari
	Dehshad-Shahriar
