= Azadi Square =

City square in Tehran, Iran

- Freedom Square
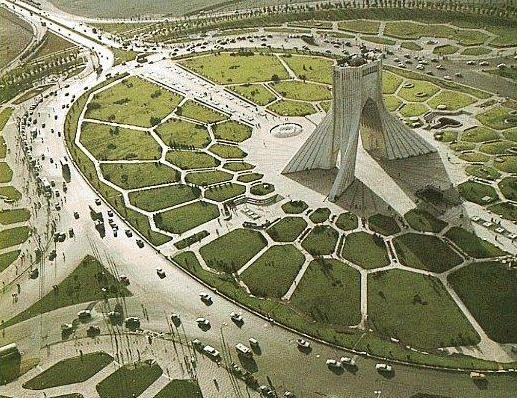
- Interactive map of Azadi Square
- Native name: Meydāne Āzādi (Persian)
- Former name: Shahyad Square
- Area: 6.8 ha (17 acres)
- Location: Tehran, Iran
- Coordinates: 35°41′59″N 51°20′14″E
- North: Mohammad Ali Jenah Expressway
- East: Azadi Street
- South: Saidi Expressway
- West: Karaj Makhsus (Special) Road

Other
- Designer: Hossein Amanat

Azadi Square (Persian: میدان آزادی, romanized: Meydān-e Āzādi, lit. 'Freedom Square'), formerly known as Shahyad Square (Persian: میدان شهیاد, romanized: Meydān-e Šahyād, lit. 'Shah's Memorial Square'), is a mainly green city square in Tehran, Iran. It hosts as its centerpiece the Azadi Tower. The tower and square were commissioned by Mohammad Reza Pahlavi, the last Shah of Iran, to mark the 2,500-year celebration of the Persian Empire.

== Design and architecture ==
It has an area of about 50,000 m^{2}, plus adjacent areas and has a very large roundabout within its main confines.

Located in the center of the Azadi Square is the Azadi Tower which has a height of 45 m. The design of the tower and the surrounding area is an archetype of Iranian-Islamic architecture and aesthetic geometry.

According to Hossein Amanat: "The designs in the square that form the gardens and flower beds are inspired by the interior design of the dome of the Sheikh Lotfollah Mosque in Isfahan; However, the geometry of the dome has become oval. "There are interesting logarithmic relationships in the geometry and dimensions of the dome of Sheikh Lotfollah Mosque, which show the deep mathematical knowledge of Iranian architects in previous periods."

"The design of water fountains and fountains is also inspired by Iranian gardens. Also, the slope of the square is carefully designed for a specific purpose, the height of the Freedom Tower is 45 meters; Because it is located near Mehrabad airport and can not be built taller than this; But I wanted to go up when you approached the building, when it was not possible to raise the building. In order to solve the problem of height, we created a slope in the field; This means that when you enter the square from the airport, you approach the tower in a downhill manner and reach that circular fountain, and when you approach the building, you go up again. The ground under the tower is perfectly flat. "This smoothness and that slope of the field, when combined, create interesting arc lines."

Before the Iranian Revolution in 1979, it was called the Shahyad Square (میدان شهیاد Meydāne Ŝahyād), meaning "Shah's Memorial Square", and was the site of many of the Revolution's demonstrations leading up to 12 December 1979. Annually many Iranians celebrate the revolution in Shahyad Square.

== Roads ==
- From north: Mohammad Ali Jenah Expressway
- From west: Karaj Makhsus (Special) Road
- From southwest: Mehrabad Airport entrance road
- From south: Saidi Expressway
- From east: Azadi Street

=== Public transportation ===
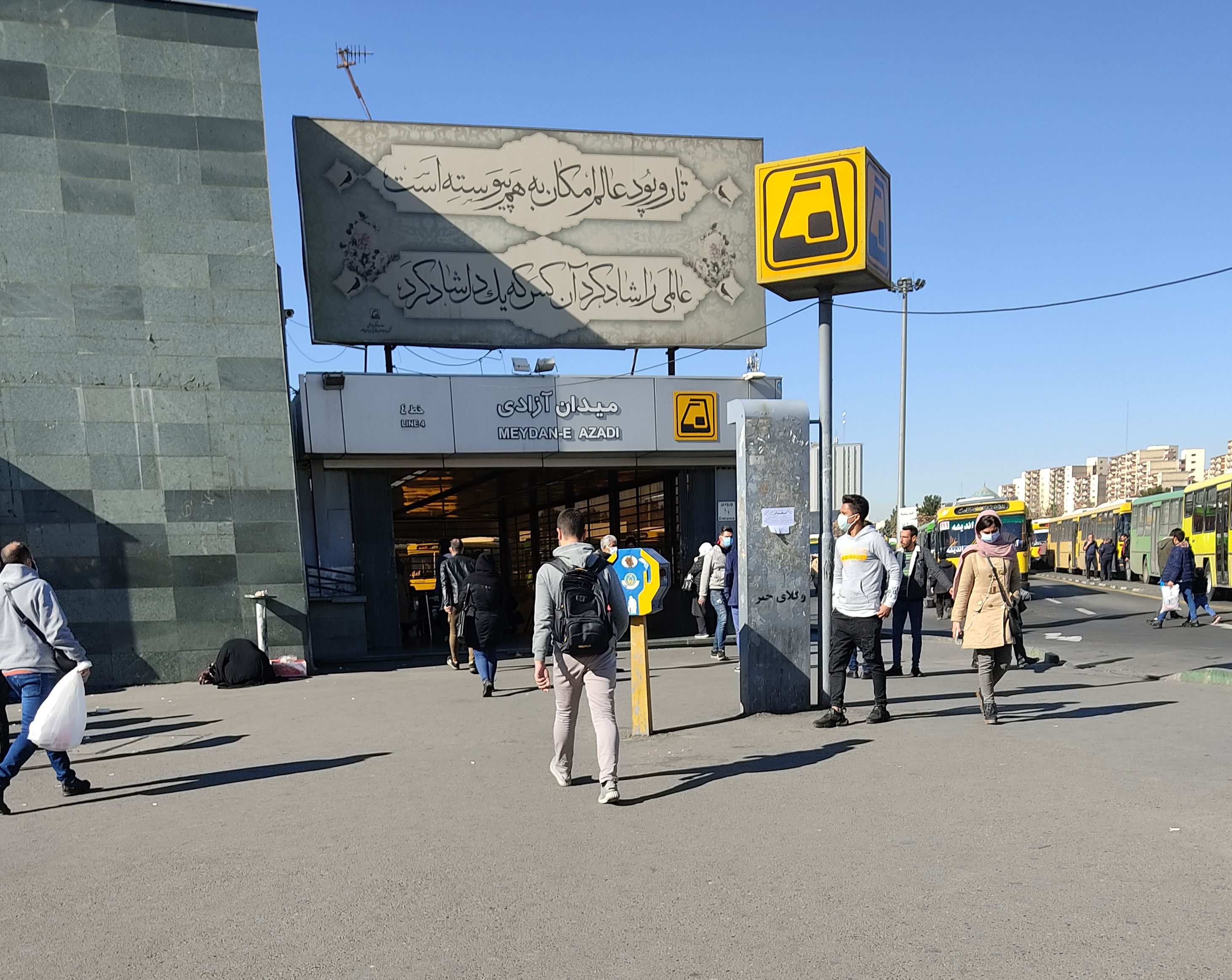
Meydan-e Azadi Metro Station entrance - 2021

- Tehran BRT Line 1, 2, 10
- Meydan-e Azadi Metro Station

== See also ==
- List of city squares by size
- Azadi Tower
