= Andisheh Municipality and Suburbs Bus Organization =

Andisheh Municipality and Suburbs Bus Organization سازمان اتوبوسرانی شهرداری اندیشه و حومه
- Founded: August 6, 2005
- Service area: Andisheh, Shahriar County, Tehran Province; Iran
- Service type: Bus service
- Routes: 3 Routes
- Fleet: 103 buses
- Daily ridership: 26,000
- Annual ridership: 9,490,000
- Operator: Andisheh Municipality
- Website: سازمان اتوبوسرانی شهرداری اندیشه و حومه

Andisheh Municipality and Suburbs Bus Organization (Persian: سازمان اتوبوسرانی شهرداری اندیشه و حومه) is a public transport agency running Transit buses in Andisheh and surrounding areas in Tehran Province.

== List of routes ==
Colour	Name
	Andisheh-Azadi
	Andisheh-Karaj-Chamran
	Andisheh-Azari
