= Tehran Metro Line 5 =

Metro line in Tehran, Iran

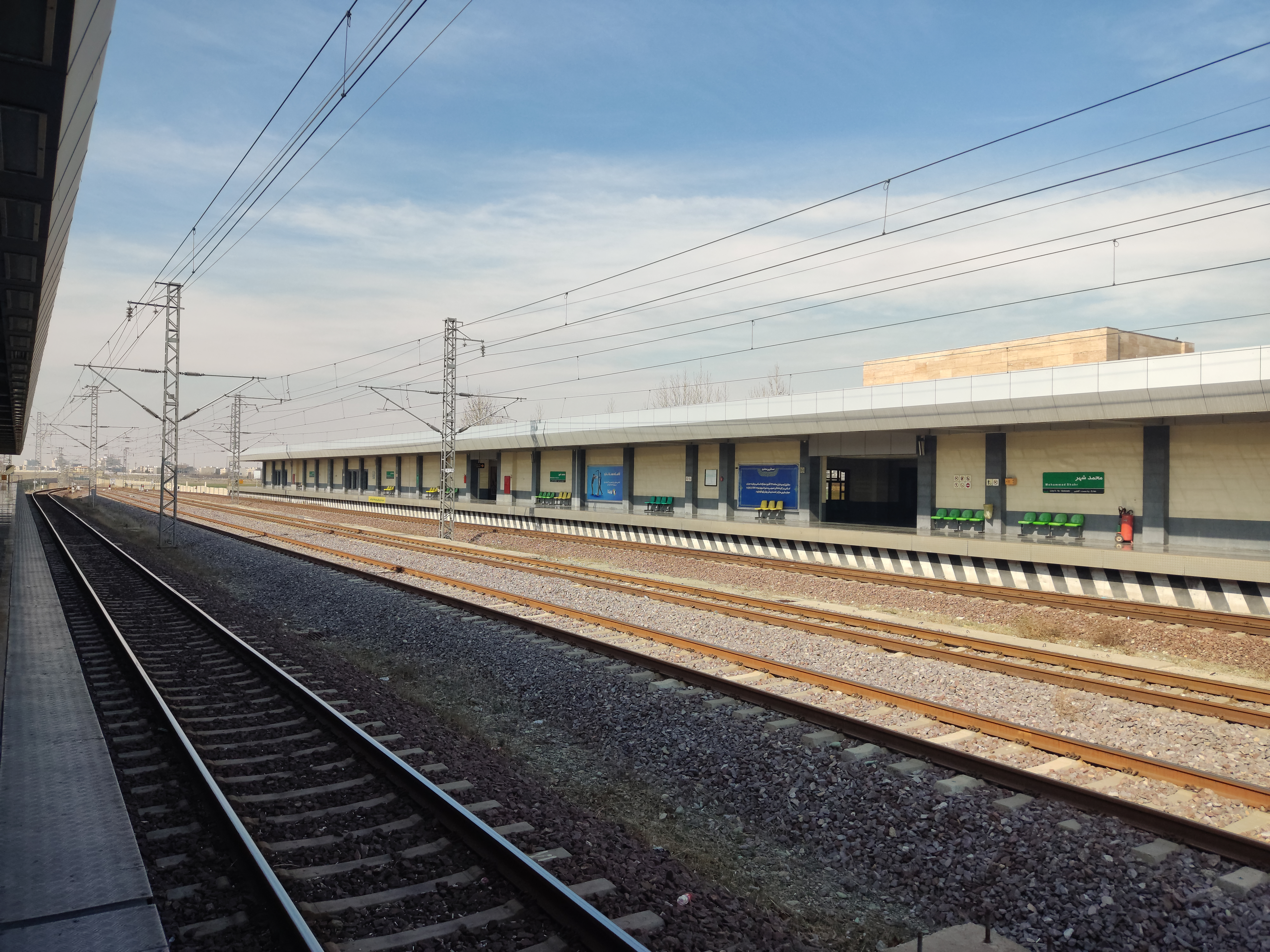
- Tehran metro line 5 (mohammadshahr station)

Overview
- Other name: Karaj Metro Line 1 (Persian: خط ۱ مترو کرج)
- Native name: خط ۵ مترو تهران
- Owner: Tehran Urban and Suburban Railways Organization (Metro)
- Locale: Tehran, Tehran Province
- Termini: Hashtgerd Station; Tehran (Sadeghiyeh) Station
- Stations: 13

Service
- Type: Commuter rail
- System: Tehran Metro
- Operator(s): Tehran Urban and Suburban Railways Organization (Metro)
- Depot(s): Tehran-West Depot

History
- Opened: 7 March 1999; 27 years ago
- Last extension: 31 December 2019

Technical
- Line length: 69 km (43 mi)
- Track gauge: 1,435 mm (4 ft 8 1/2 in)
- Electrification: 25 kV AC overhead catenary
Route map
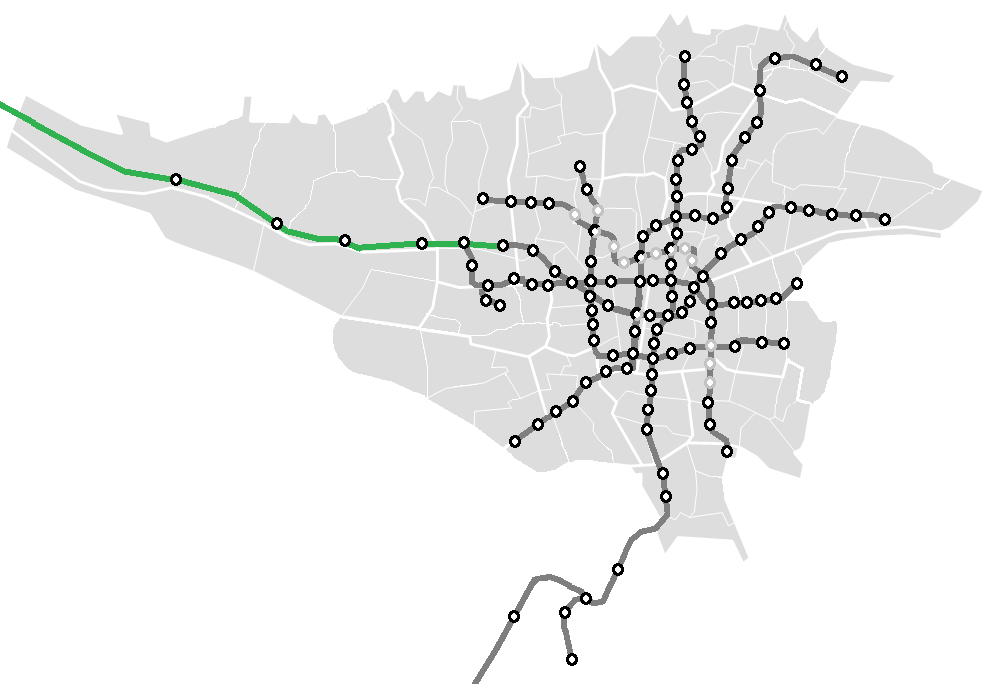
Tehran
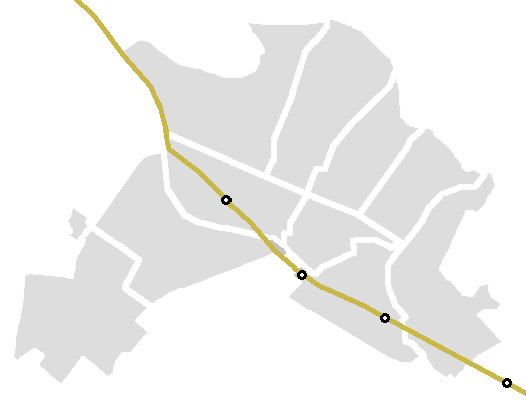
Karaj

Line 5 is coloured green on system maps; it is a 69-kilometer-long (43 mi) regional rail line and has thirteen stations. Entering the area of Karaj with main stations at Karaj and Golshahr. It connects with the western end of Line 2 at Tehran (Sadeghiyeh) station. A western extension towards Hashtgerd has been inaugurated in December 2019

The line is also assigned to be Karaj Metro Line 1 in Karaj's 6-line Metro expansion master plan.
