= Tehran Bus Rapid Transit =

Bus service in Tehran, Iran

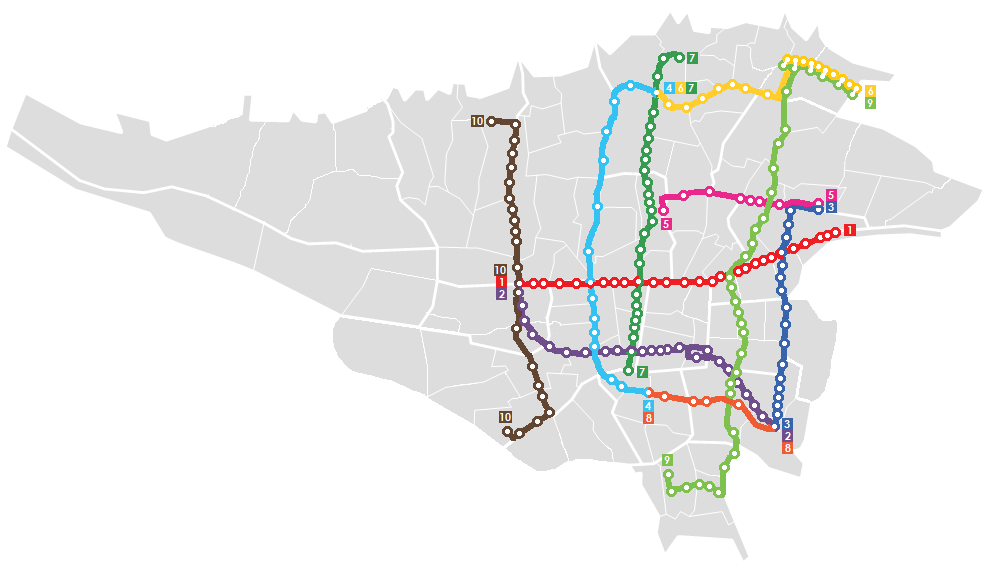
System map

Tehran's transit map, with the BRT as a part of it

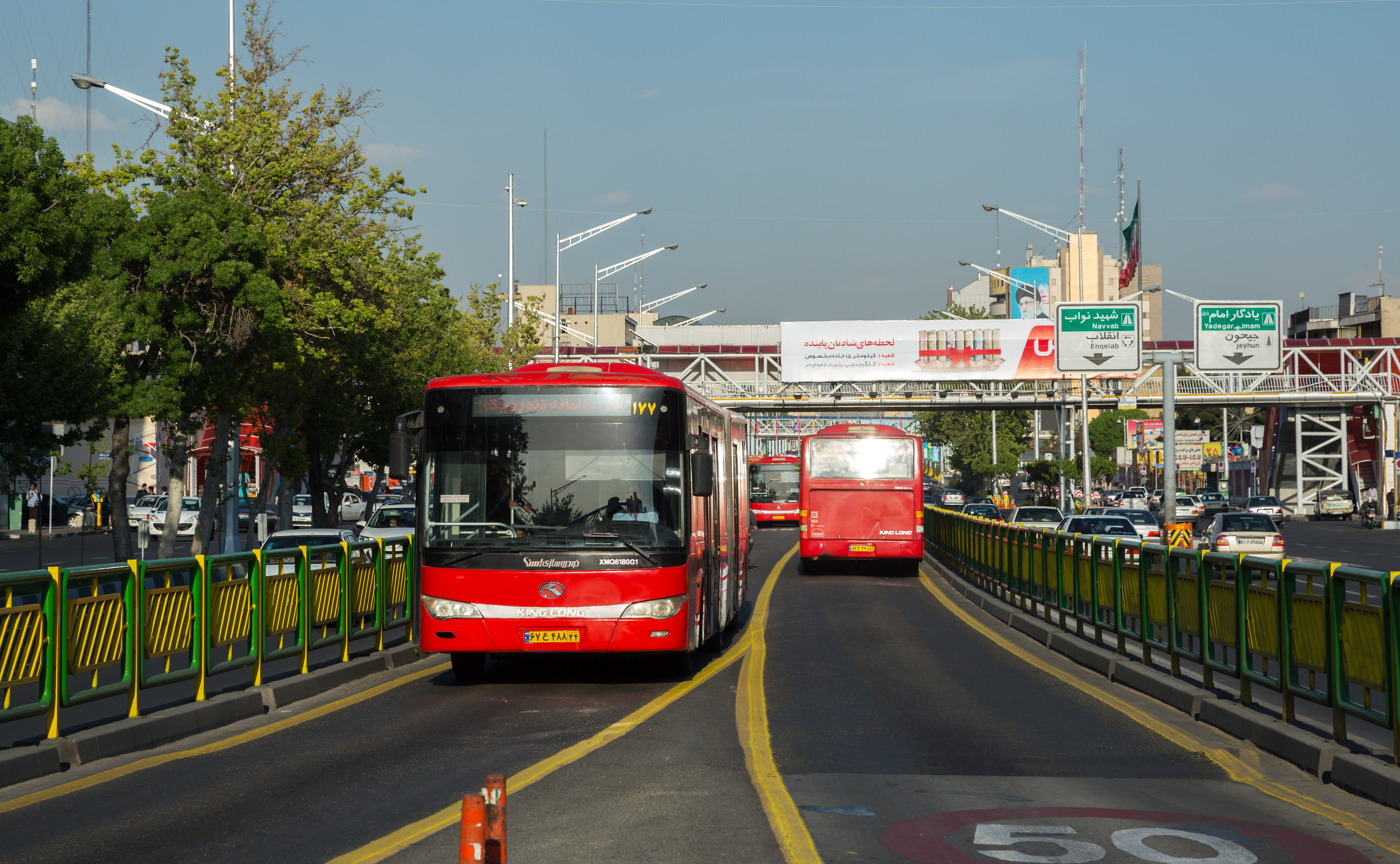
Tehran Bus Rapid Transit

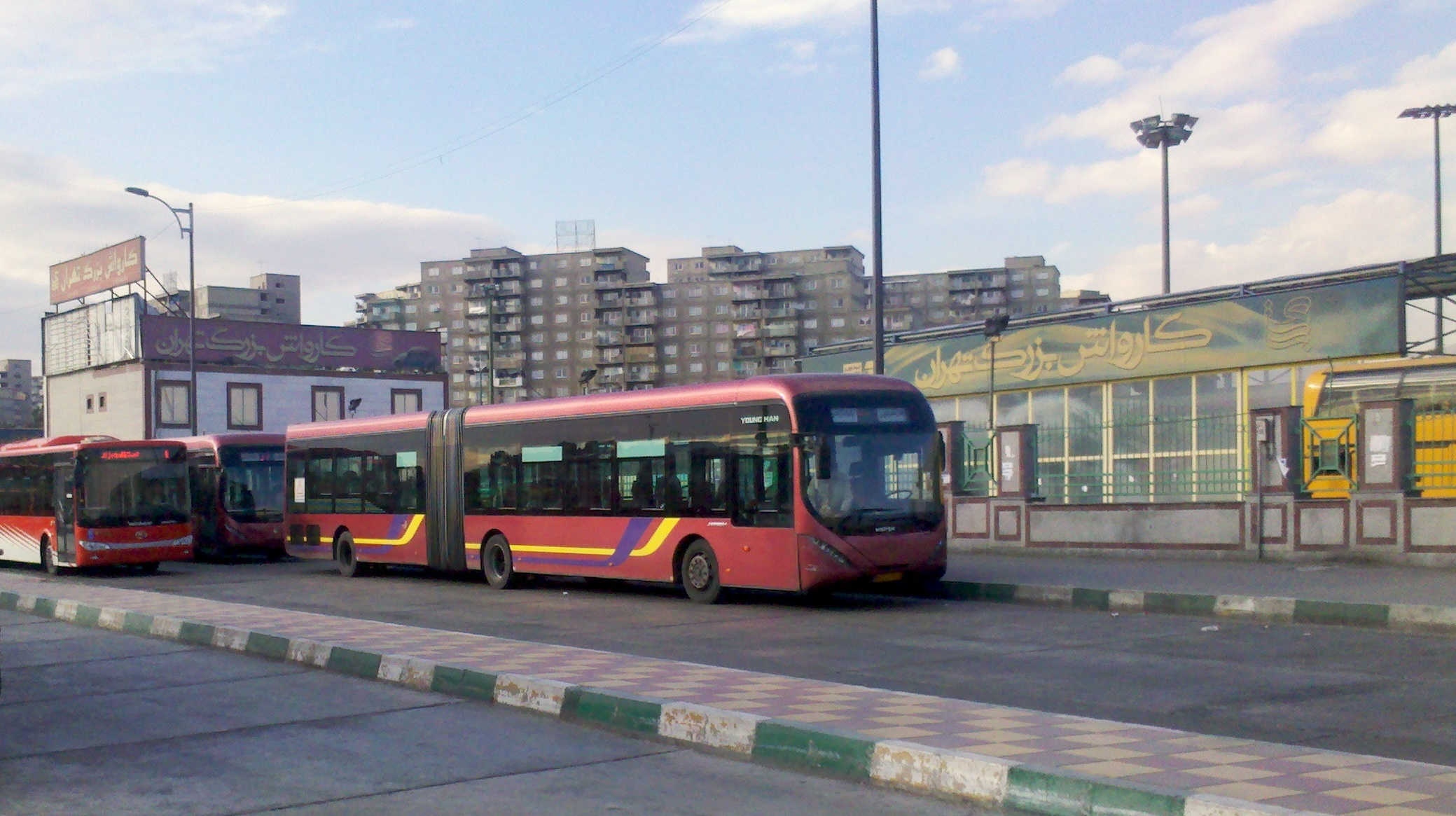
Tehran Rapid Transit Renault and Youngman buses at the Azadi passenger terminal

Tehran Bus Rapid Transit was officially inaugurated in 2008 in order to facilitate the motor traffic in Tehran. As of 2015, the bus rapid transit (BRT) system had a network of about 150 kilometres (90 mi), and transported an average of two million passengers daily.

== Routes ==
As of 2023, Tehran had 10 BRT lines.

- Line 1: Azadi Terminal to Tehranpars crossroad; 27 stops; 18.5 km (11.5 mi)
- Line 2: Azadi Terminal to Khavaran Terminal; 28 stops; 18.5 km (11.5 mi)
- Line 3: Science & Tech Terminal to Khavaran Terminal; 24 stops; 13.5 km (8.4 mi)
- Line 4: Tehran South Terminal to Afshar Terminal; 24 stops; 21.5 km (13.4 mi)
- Line 5: Science & Tech (Elm-o-san'at Terminal to Argentina Sq. - (Beihaghi Terminal); 10 stops; 9.5 km (5.9 mi)
- Line 6: Chamran Highway - Afshar Terminal to Sohanak (Laleh Terminal); 17 stops; 14.5 km (9.0 mi)
- Line 7: Railway (southern part of Tehran) to Tajrish (northern part of Tehran) (Valiasr Ave.); 36 stops; 18 km (11 mi)
- Line 8: Tehran South Terminal to Khavaran Terminal; 6 stops; 7 km (4.3 mi)
- Line 9: Laleh Terminal to Javanmard Ghassab Metro Station; 34 stops; 34 km (21 mi)
- Line 10: Jannat Abad Terminal to Azadegan Terminal; 25 stops; 23.5 km (14.6 mi)

== See also ==
- Transport in Iran
- Trolleybuses in Tehran
