= Karaj and Suburbs Bus Organization =

Karaj and Suburbs Bus Organization سازمان اتوبوسرانی کرج و حومه
- Founded: September 22, 1991
- Service area: Karaj-Kamalshahr, Alborz Province; Iran
- Service type: Bus service
- Routes: 65 Routes
- Fleet: ~800 Buses
- Operator: Karaj City Municipality
- Chief executive: Mehrdad Kiani
- Website: سازمان اتوبوسرانی کرج و حومه

Karaj and Suburbs Bus Organization (Persian: سازمان اتوبوسرانی کرج و حومه) is a public transport agency running Transit buses in Karaj and surrounding cities in Alborz Province, Iran.
