= Hashtgerd Metro Station =

Station of the Tehran Metro

Shahid Sepahbod Qasem Soleimani station ایستگاه متروی شهید سپهبد قاسم سلیمانی
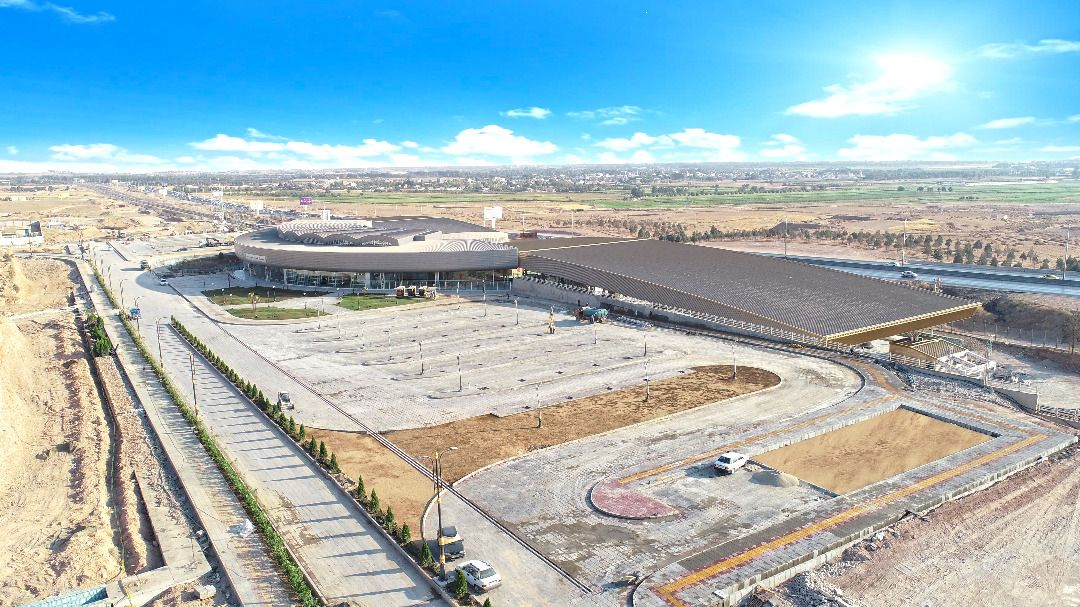

General information
- Location: Mehestan; Alborz province, Iran
- Coordinates: 35.8250°N 50.9329°E
- System: Tehran Metro Station
- Operator: Tehran Urban and Suburban Railways Organization (Metro)

Construction
- Depth: Surface

History
- Opened: 2019

Services
Preceding station	Tehran Metro	Following station
Terminus	Line 5	Shahid Fakhrizadeh (Mammut) towards Tehran (Sadeghiyeh)
Location

Shahid Sepahbod Qasem Soleimani Metro Station is the western terminus of Tehran Metro Line 5. It is located east of Hashtgerd towards the Mehestan New Town development. The next station is Shahid Fakhrizadeh (Mammut) Metro Station.
