= List of expressways in Tehran =

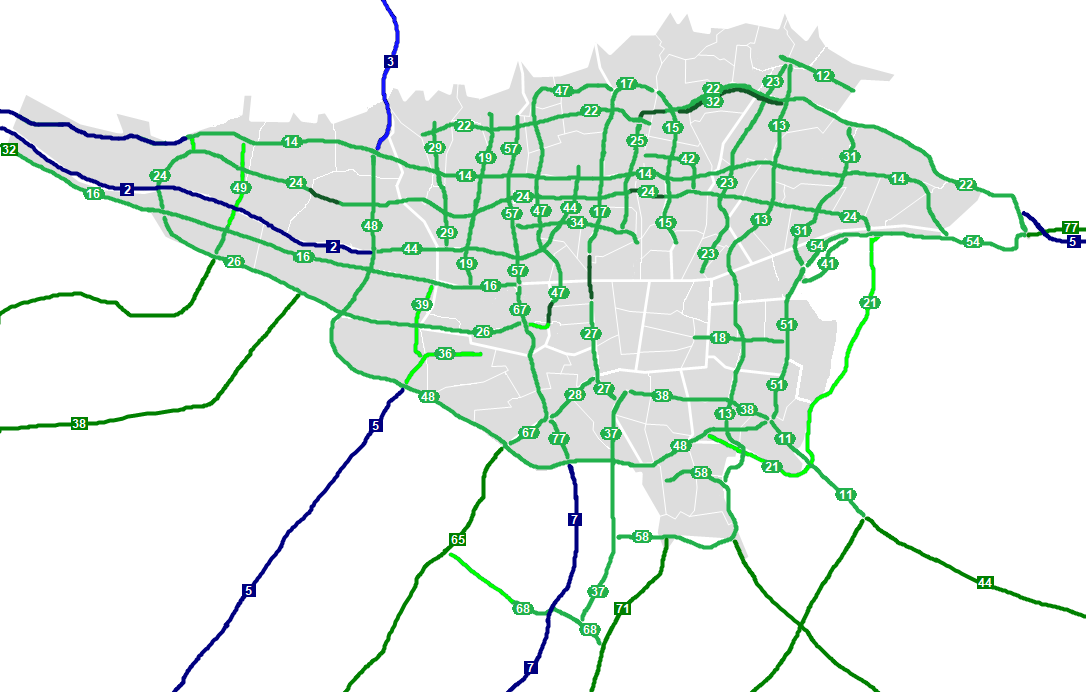
Expressways in Tehran (2019)

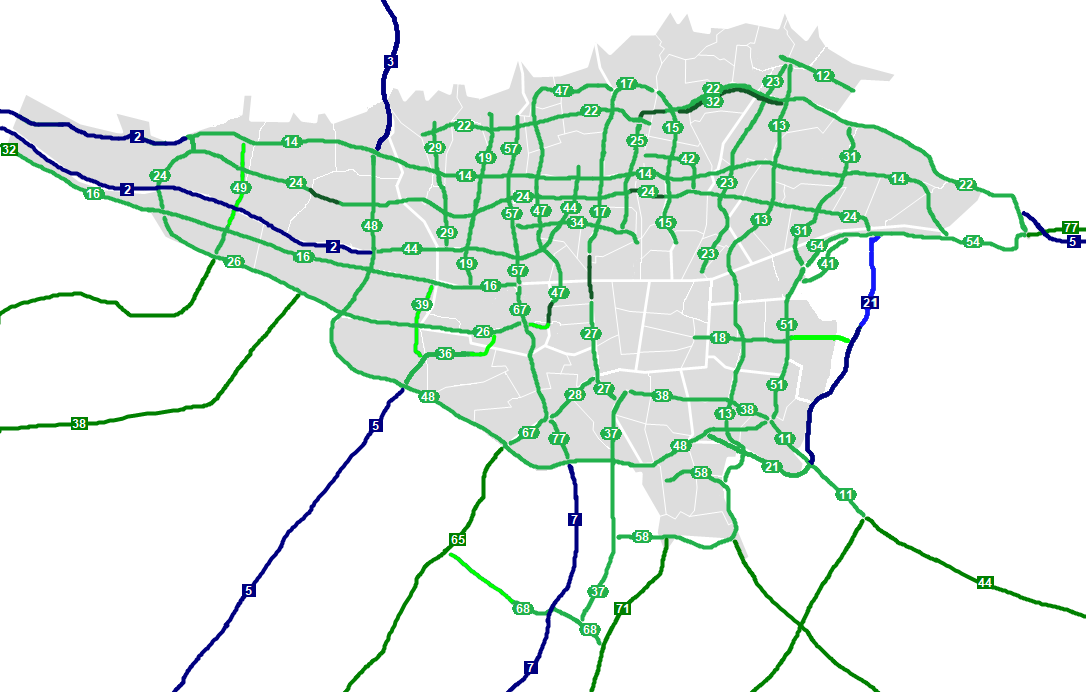
Expressways in Tehran (2026)

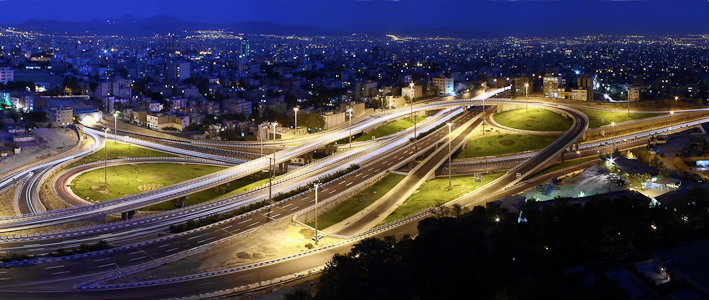
Kordestan Expressway interchange with Resalat and Hakim expressways

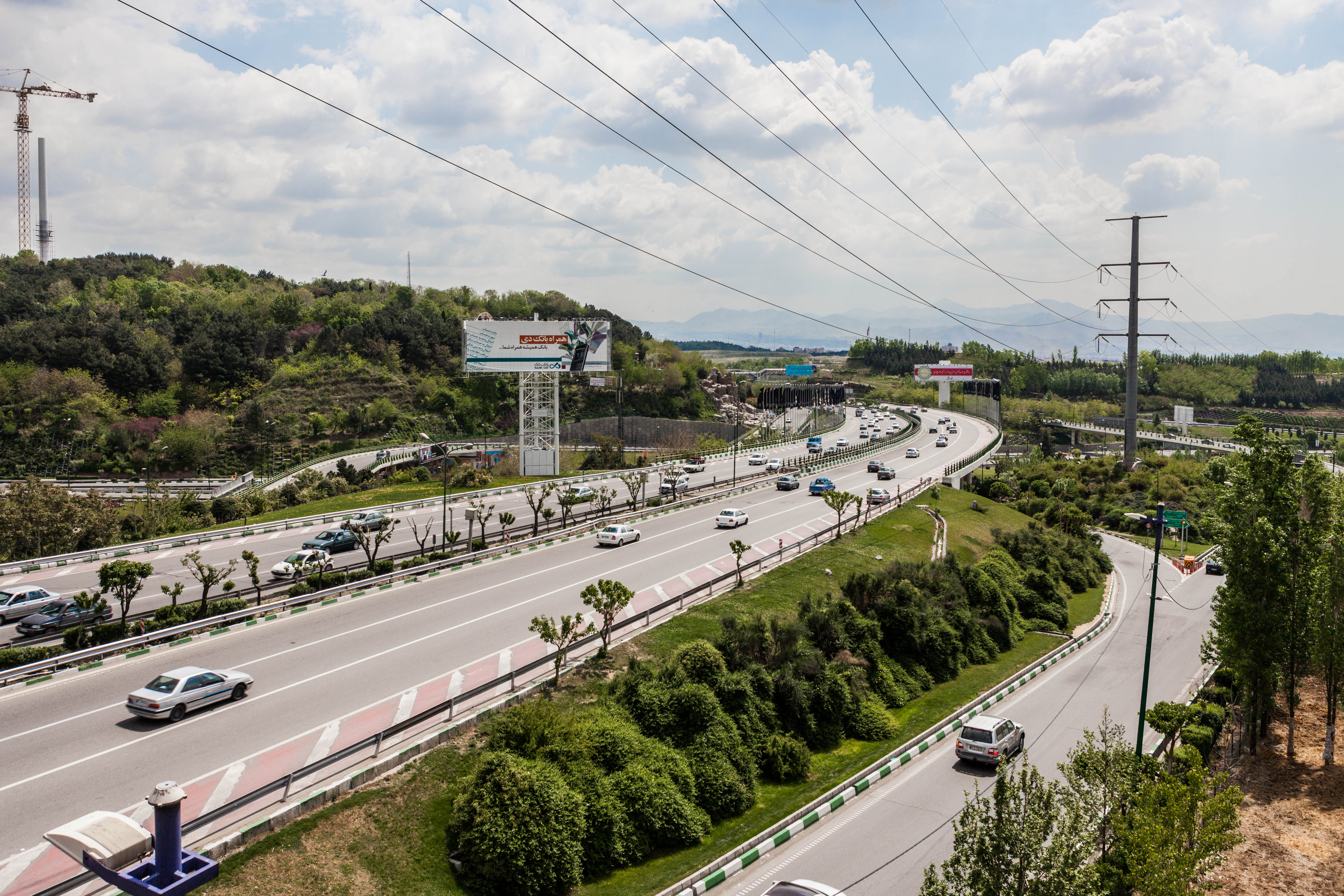
Hemmat Expressway, Tehran

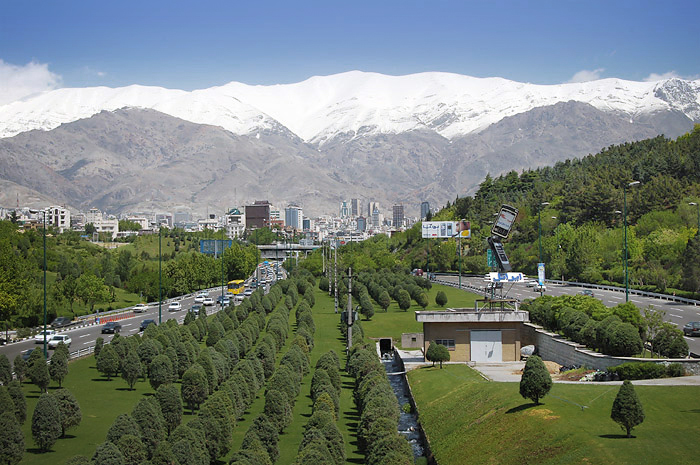
Modarres Expressway, Tehran

Expressway sign in Iran

The list of expressways in Tehran as of the middle of 2013.

== East–west ==
- Ahang Expressway
- Allameh Jafari Expressway
- Babayi Expressway
- Besat Expressway
- Fath Expressway
- Hakim Expressway
- Hemmat Expressway
- Iranpars Expressway
- Jalal-e-Ale Ahmad Expressway
- Mahallati Expressway
- Hashemi Rafsanjani Expressway
- Qasem Soleimani Expressway
- Sadr Expressway
- Zeinoddin Expressway

== North–south ==
- Ashrafi Esfahani Expressway
- Bagheri Expressway
- Bakeri Expressway
- Basij Expressway
- Chamran Expressway
- Imam Ali Expressway
- Kordestan Expressway
- Modares Expressway
- Mohammad Ali Jenah Expressway
- Navvab Expressway
- Saidi Expressway
- Sayyad Expressway
- Shahid Sattari Expressway
- Tondguyan Expressway
- Yadegar-e-Emam Expressway

== Other ==
- Azadegan Expressway
- Ayatollah Kashani Expressway
- Behesht-e Zahra Expressway
- Doran Expressway
- Kazemi Expressway
- Northern Behesht-e Zahra Expressway
- Javaneh Expressway
- Qale Morghi Expressway
- Shahid Gomnam Expressway
- Shahid Haghani Expressway
- Sheikh Fazl-allah Nouri Expressway
- Yasini Expressway
