= Shahrak-e Gharb =

Complex of luxury apartments in Tehran, Iran

Shahrak-e Gharb شهرک غرب
- Neighbourhood
- Shahrak-e Ghods
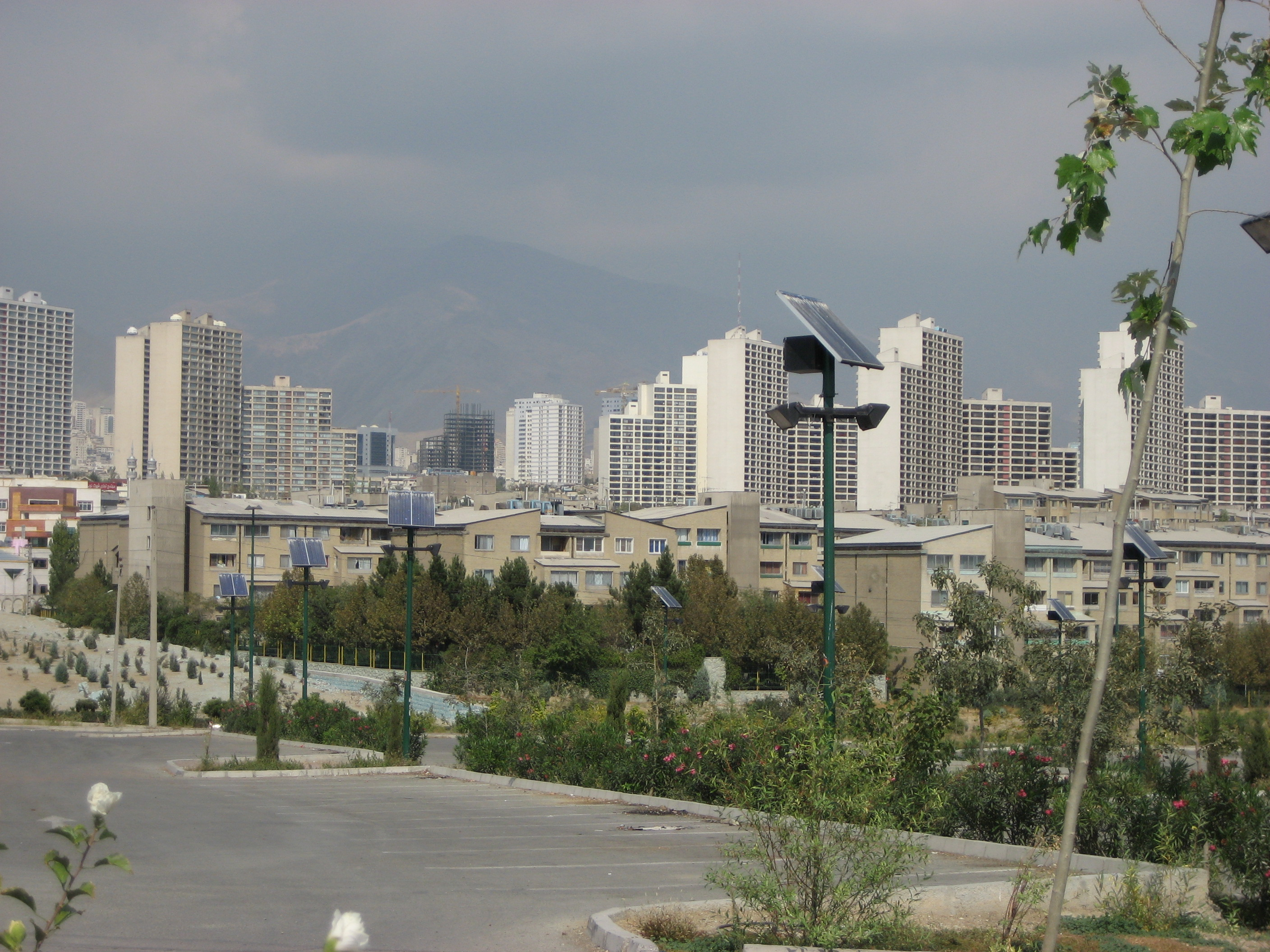
- Part of Shahrak-e Gharb in 2008
- Interactive map of Shahrak-e Gharb
- Coordinates: 35.75904°N 51.37603°E
- Built: 1960s

Government
  - Type: Municipality
  - Body: District 2 (Tehran)

Area
  - Total: 398 ha (980 acres)
  - Rank: 31 out of 353

Population (2016)
  - Total: 29,774
  - Density: 7,480/km^{2} (19,400/sq mi)
- Time zone: UTC+03:30
- Website: region2.tehran.ir (only accessible in Iran)

Shahrak-e Gharb or Gharb Town (Persian: شهرک غرب, romanized: Šahrak-e Gharb, lit. 'West Town'), officially Qods Town (Persian: شهرک قدس, romanized: Šahrak-e Qods, lit. 'Quds (Jerusalem) Town'), is a planned town built as a massive project of modern, luxury apartment buildings and villas in the north-western part of Tehran, Iran.

== History ==
Originally built based on the model of upscale American suburbs in 1961 by French architects, today it is considered one of the most affluent neighborhoods of Tehran. The town was built in seven "phases" (Persian: فاز), which now delineate its districts. Only Phase 1 was built before the 1979 Iranian Revolution, the rest was built by the new Islamic government. It is one of the largest districts of Tehran, including easy access to expressways including Chamran Expressway, Hemmat Expressway, Niayesh Expressway, Sheikh Fazl-allah Nouri Expressway, and Yadegar-e-Emam Expressway, proximity to four major hospitals, as well as three large and famous shopping centers, numerous parks, cinema and cultural centers, police and fire stations, and post offices.

Government hostility towards the West following the Islamic revolution of 1979 led to the neighbourhood being renamed to "Sharak-e Qods", literally "Jerusalem Town". The original name continues to be widely used. The area has a history of resistance to the Iranian regime; social anthropologist Shahram Khosravi calls it "a dissident neighborhood". In 1996 a teenager, Alireza Farzaneh-Far, died at his birthday party after falling from an 18th floor balcony after it was raided by the local Basij following a tip-off. Whilst the official version of events claimed that he fell when attempting to abscond, his family and foreign broadcasters charged that he had been pushed by a basiji. The death caused much discussion within Tehran, "underlin[ing] the reputation of Shahrak-e Gharb".

Around the 1980s, there was only one central shopping center there, named Bāzārče ("mini-bazaar"). Construction of the Golestan Shopping Center began a few years after the Iran–Iraq War. It was designed by Jordan Gruzen Architects in 1978 and built by another American company by the name Starrett, although some sections were never completed. Today, several modern shopping centers including Golestan, Iran Zamin, and Milad-e-Noor are located in this area. Phase 7 was built by the Iranian government in 1989, involving the confiscation and re-allocation of much of the land in the area.

The tallest tower in Iran, Milad Tower, which stands 435m high from base to tip of the antenna, is located just outside the district.

An international school is located nearby, within the town, and a second is minutes away in Sa'adat Abad. Because of the eastward current of the air in Tehran and its constant purification by the adjacent mountains, this town is less polluted compared to other northern parts of the city. These and many more advantages have made this area a prime and pleasant location for living, attracting many foreign temporary residents, diplomats and expatriates.

== Education ==
The Americans, who at that time constituted the majority of the community living in this neighborhood, used their influence to create and expand a school, a gymnasium, and extensive recreational facilities in the West Town with the help of the Pahlavi government. For example, the Iranzamin School, known as the American School, founded by Mr. Richard Irvine from the United States, was so large in this area that after the Islamic Revolution, although it was converted into two separate schools for girls and boys in all grades, a gymnasium, a circus and theater venue, a cinema hall, etc., there were still many unused spaces inside the American buildings, which made it difficult for the confiscators to maintain these buildings. Some of these buildings have also been handed over to the Islamic Azad University .

The Islamic Azad University, West Tehran Branch (WTBIAU) is a private university in Shahrak-e Gharb, Tehran, Iran. Founded in 1994

== Gallery ==
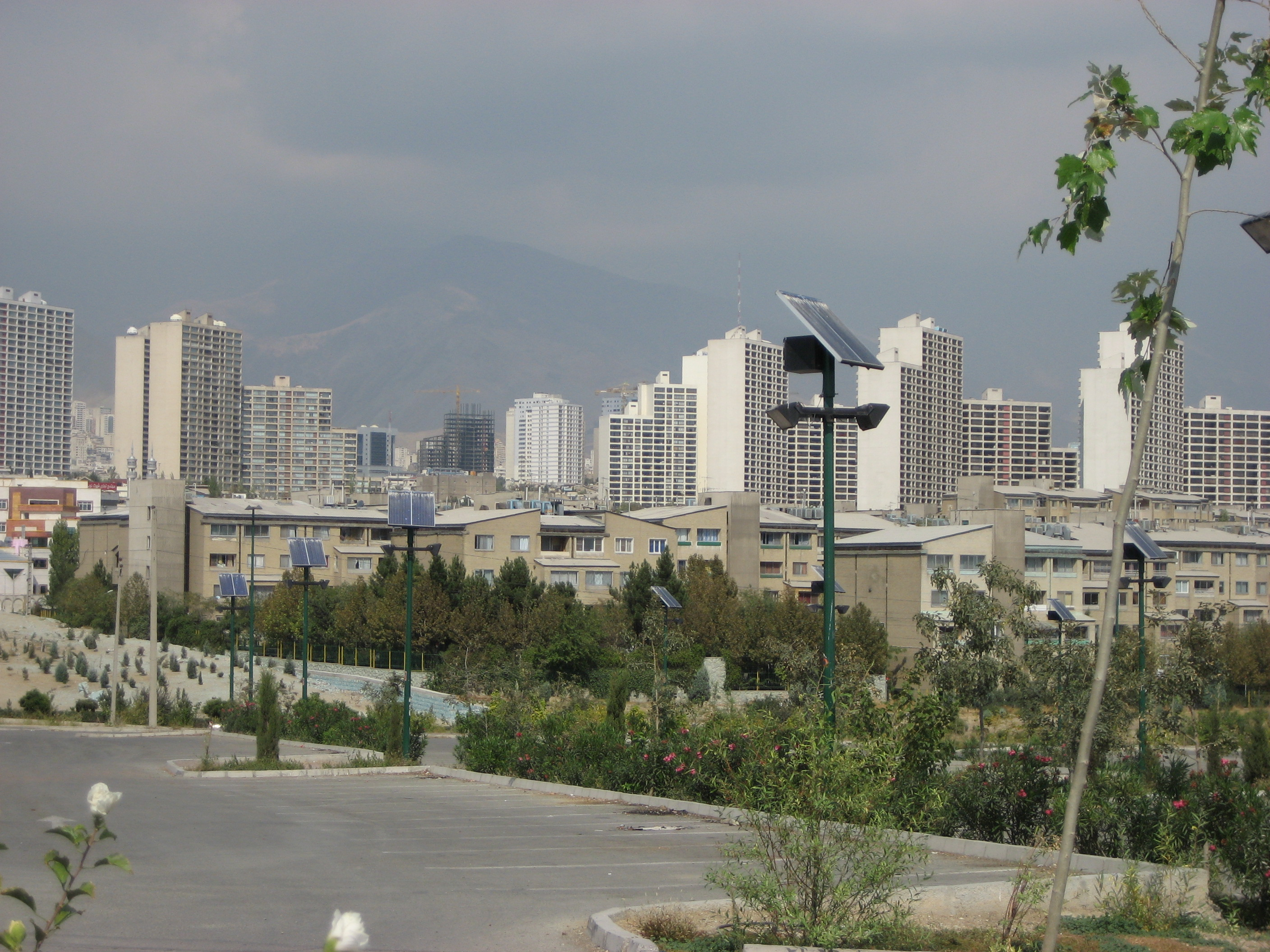
Shahrah-e Gharb Towers

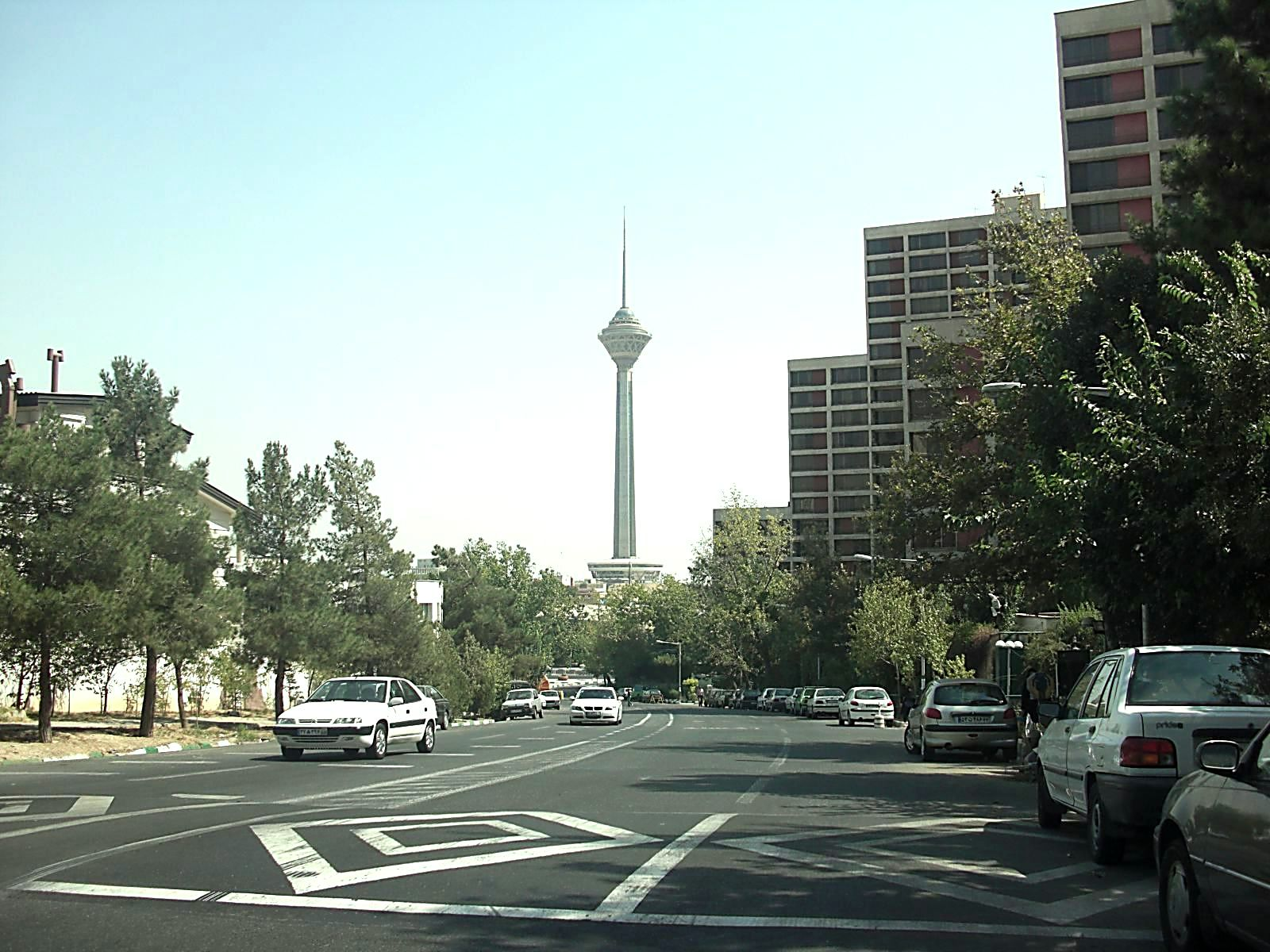
Milad Tower seen from Hormozan street

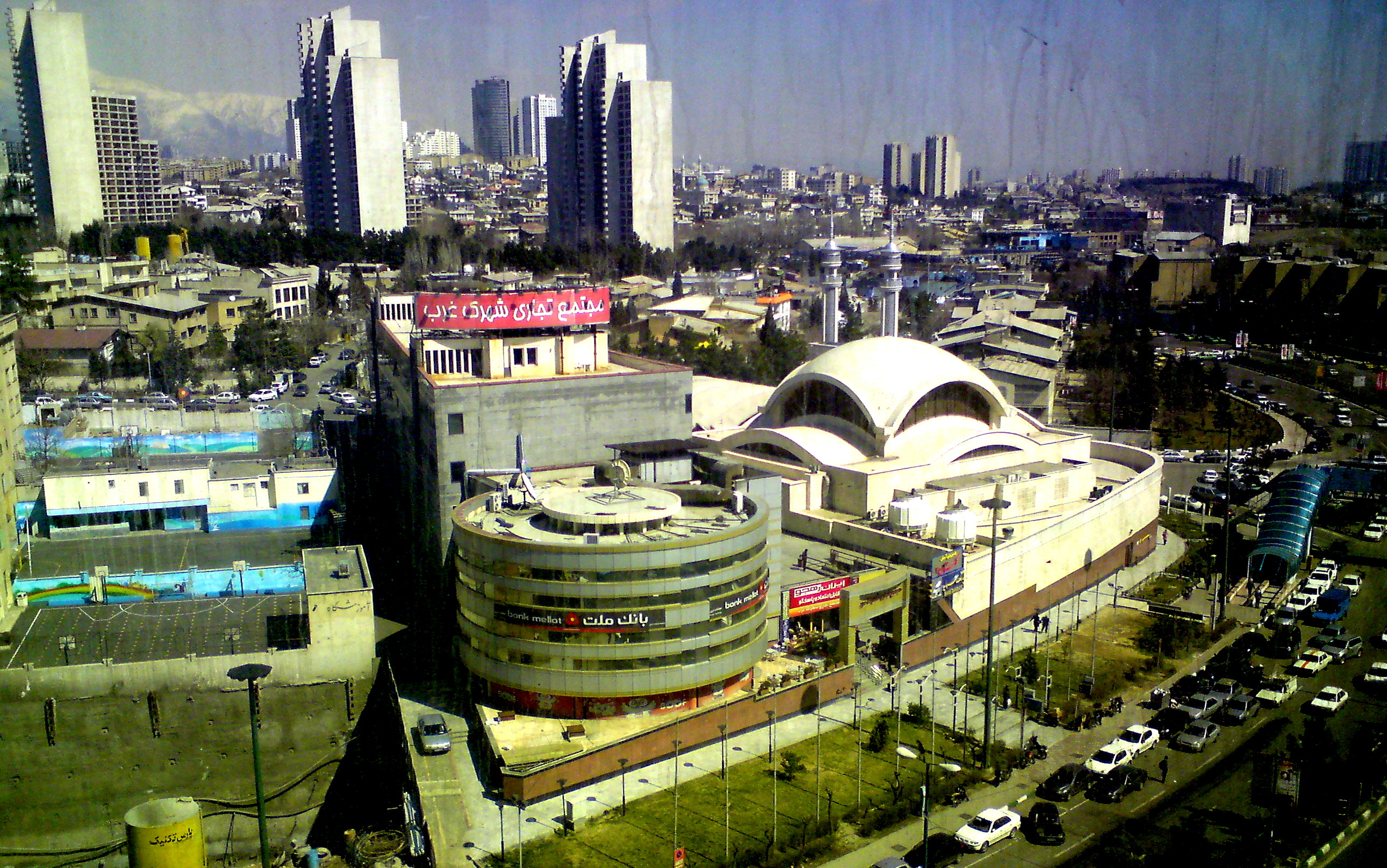
Milad Noor

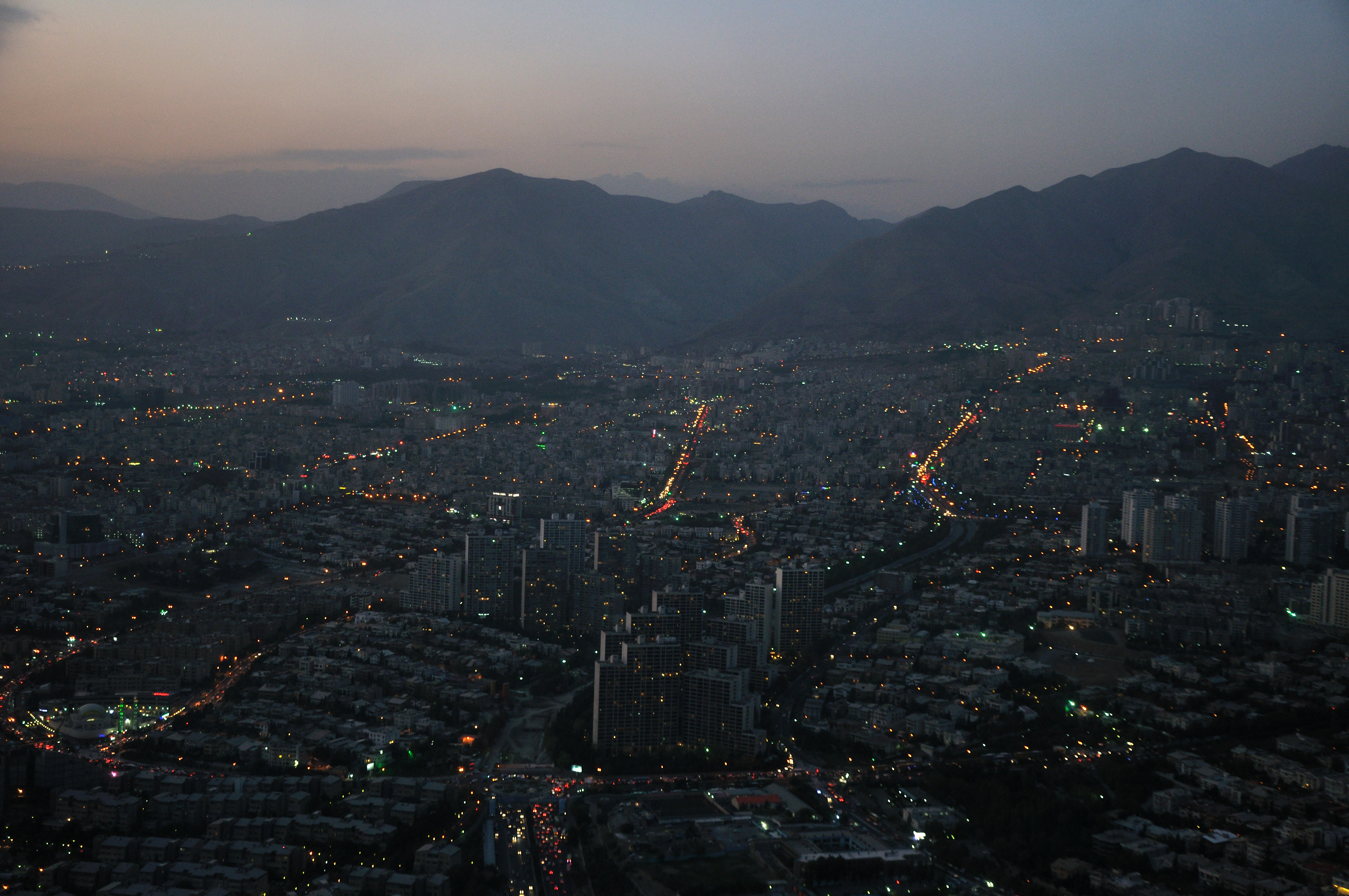
Shahrak Gharb seen from Milad Tower

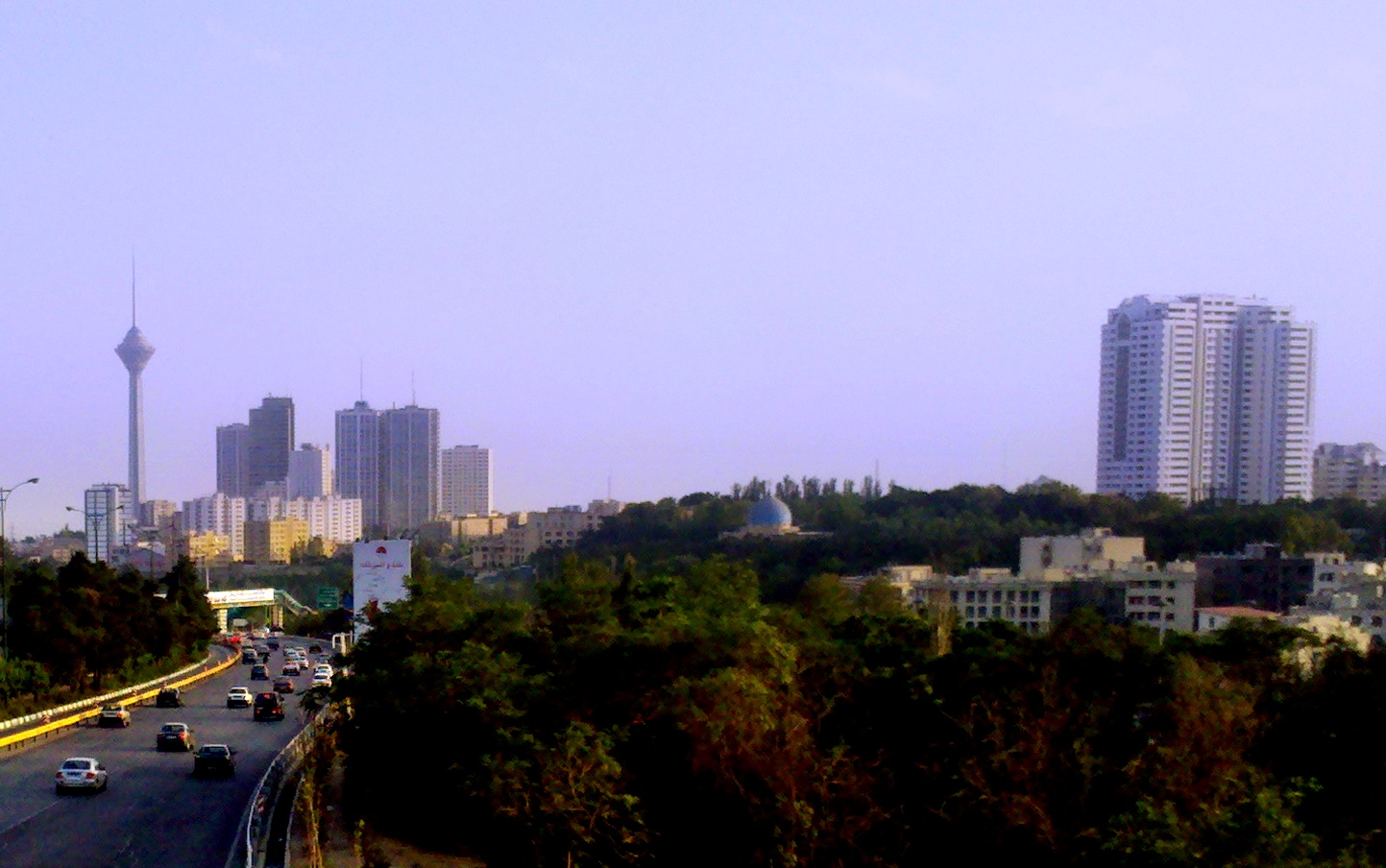
Shahrak Gharb view from Chamran Expressway

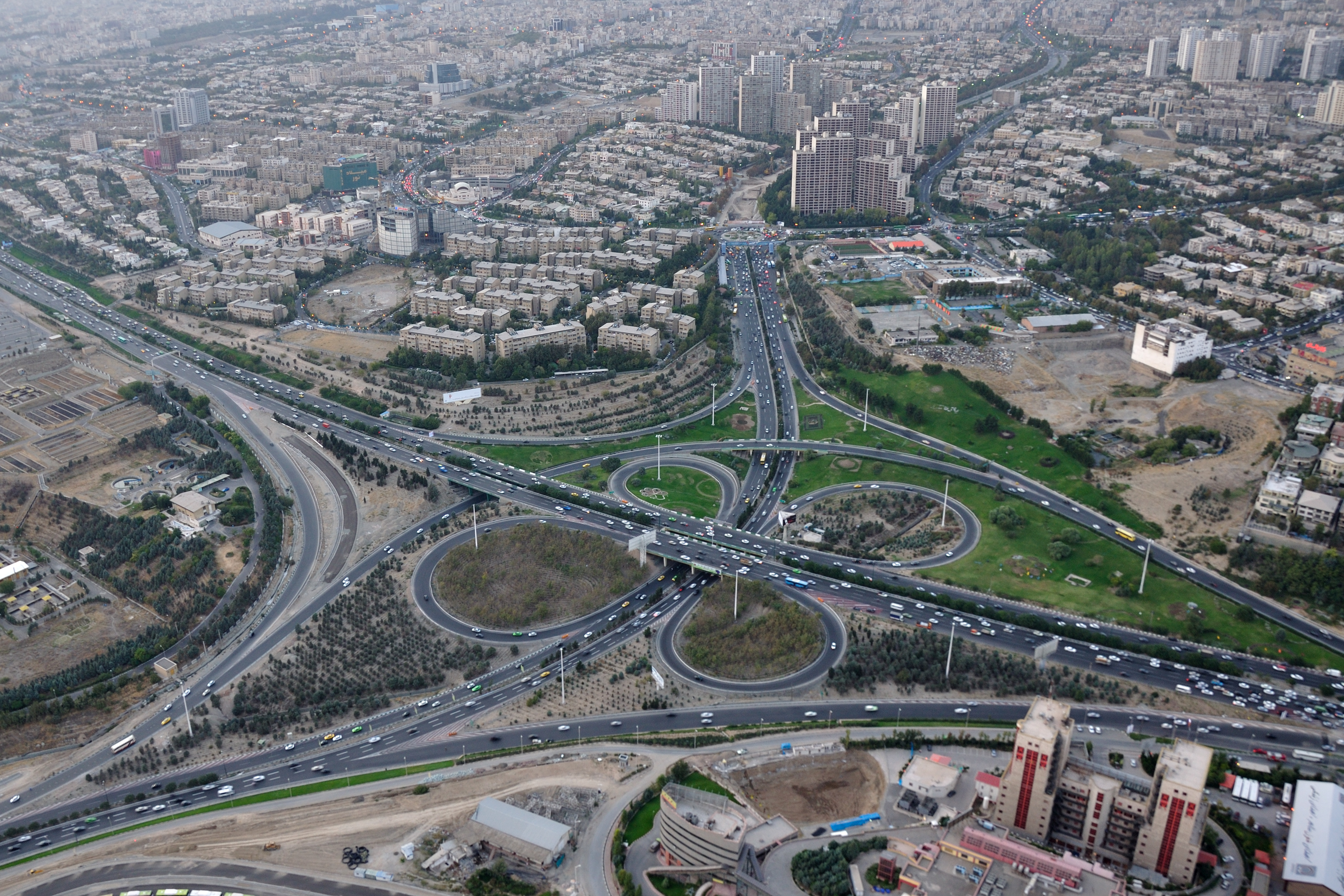
Shahrak Gharb entrance from Hemmat Expressway

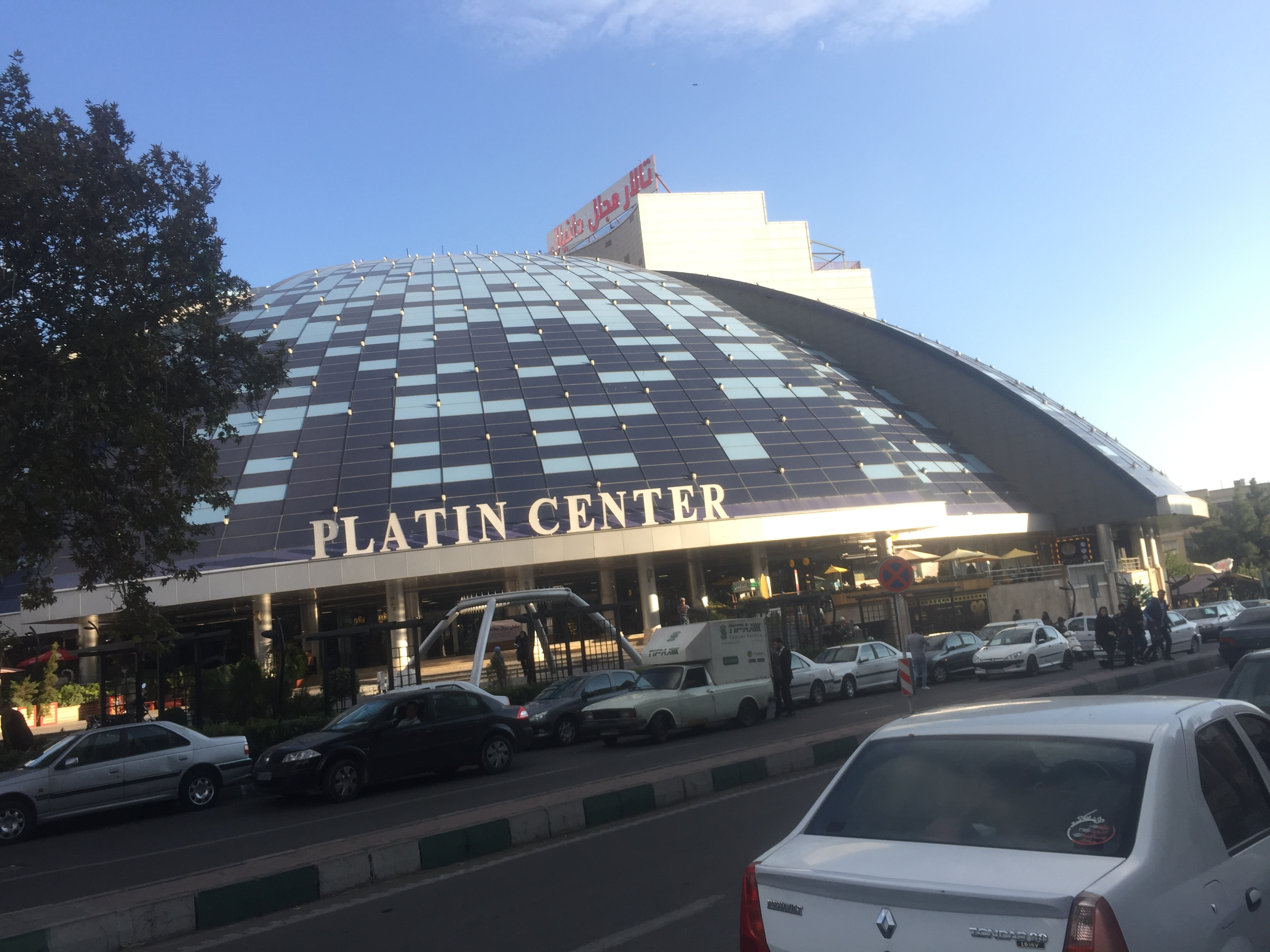
Platin Shopping Center

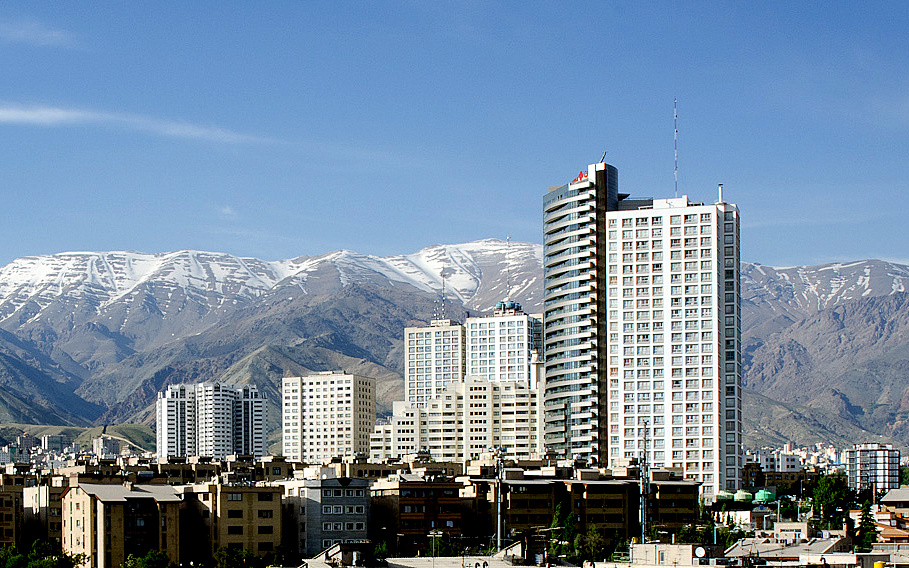
Mahestan Residential Complex
