= Sheikh Fazl-allah Nouri Expressway =

Expressway in Tehran, Iran

Sheikh Fazl-ollah Nouri Expressway
- شیخ فضل الله نوری بزرگراه
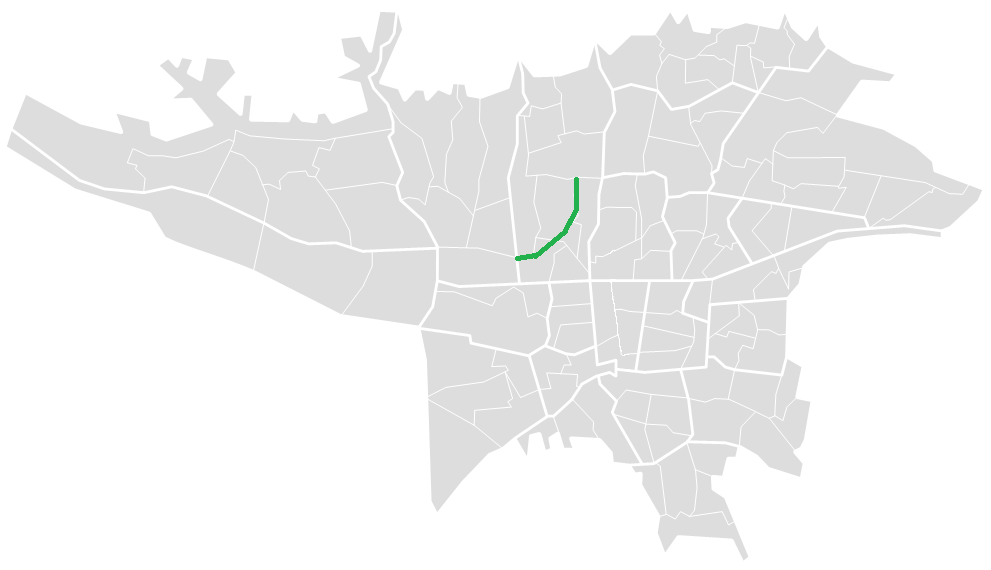

Route information
- Length: 14.2 km (8.8 mi)

Major junctions
- North end: Sanat Square
- West end: Freeway 2 Azadegan Expressway

Location
- Country: Iran
- Major cities: Tehran

Highway system
- Highways in Iran; Freeways

Sheikh Fazlollah Nouri Expressway starts from the end of Tehran-Karaj Freeway. It passes Bakeri Expressway, Shahid Sattari Expressway, Mohammad Ali Jenah Expressway, Yadegar-e-Emam Expressway, Jalal-e-Ale Ahmad Expressway, Resalat Expressway and Hemmat Expressway and reaches Sanat Square in West Town.

From North to South
Sanat Square	Shahid Paknejad Boulevard; Khourdin Boulevard; Shahid Farahzadi Boulevard
	Hemmat Expressway
	Hakim Expressway
	Marzdaran Boulevard
	Jalal-e-Ale Ahmad Expressway
	Sazman-e Ab Street
	Sattar Khan Street
	Yadegar-e-Emam Expressway
	Sohravard Street
	Mohammad Ali Jenah Expressway
	Tehran Western Bus Terminal; Sadeghieh (Tehran) Metro Station
	Sattari Expressway; Ekbatan
	Bakeri Expressway
	Shisheh Mina Boulevard Azadi Stadium Azadi Stadium Metro Station
	Azadi Stadium Western Boulevard Azadi Stadium
	Tehran-Karaj Freeway; Azadegan Expressway
Continues as: Tehran-Karaj Freeway
From South to North
