= IranOpen =

Iranian teams have been active participants of RoboCup events since 1998. The number of Iranian teams has been largely increasing over the past years. Thereby, the need to have a regional event seemed rather necessary. Furthermore, since the overall number world interested teams in RoboCup has increased; regional events may and can be a proper field for RoboCup leagues Technical Committees to see teams qualities for RoboCup World Competitions. IranOpen is a place for teams willing to take part in RoboCup World Competitions in order to show their qualities and standards. It is also a place for fresh teams to gain experience and become ready to join the world teams.

== RoboCup ==
RoboCup is an international joint project to promote AI, robotics, and related field. It is an attempt to foster AI and intelligent robotics research by providing a standard problem where a wide range of technologies can be integrated and examined. RoboCup chose to use soccer games as a central topic of research, aiming at innovations to be applied for socially significant problems and industries. The ultimate goal of the RoboCup project is by 2050, develop a team of fully autonomous humanoid robots that can win against the human world champion team in soccer. In order for a robot team to actually perform a soccer game, various technologies must be incorporated including: design principles of autonomous agents, multi-agent collaboration, strategy acquisition, real-time reasoning, robotics, and sensor-fusion. RoboCup is a task for a team of multiple fast-moving robots under a dynamic environment. RoboCup also offers a software platform for research on the software aspects of RoboCup. One of the major applications of RoboCup technologies is a search and rescue in large scale disaster. RoboCup initiated RoboCupRescue project to specifically promote research in socially significant issues.

== IranOpen 2006 ==
Azad University of Qazvin as the pioneer in organizing a RoboCup event in Iran prepared a strong proposal for the RoboCup Federation which was then approved by the Federation to organize RoboCup IranOpen2006. RoboCup IranOpen2006 took place at Tehran International Fair from April 7 to April 9. It was the first but successful experience of organizing a RoboCup event in Iran. About 100 teams competed in 7 leagues and over 3000 visitors enjoined watching the games.

== IranOpen 2007 ==
Azad University of Qazvin having the successful experience of organizing RoboCup IranOpen2006 decided to organize RoboCup IranOpen2007 in a more broad range. The proposal of the Azad University was approved by Iranian RoboCup National Committee and sent to the RoboCup Federation for final approval. It was then finally approved by the Federation. Therefore, RoboCup IranOpen2007 took place in Tehran International Fair from 5–7 April 2007. About 260 teams competed in 15 leagues and over 5000 visitors enjoyed watching the games.

== IranOpen 2008 ==
Azad University of Qazvin for the third consequent year was approved by Iranian RoboCup National Committee to organize RoboCup IranOpen2008. This has also been approved by the RoboCup Federation. This year for the first time the event will take place in Azad University of Qazvin main campus from 3–5 April 2008. RoboCup IranOpen2008 welcomes all interested teams to join the event and compete in 16 leagues.

== IranOpen 2009 ==
RoboCup IranOpen 2009 being the fourth annual RoboCup IranOpen competitions will be held on April 4–6, 2009. Iranian RoboCup National Committee and Azad University of Qazvin as organizers of this event wish all the participants luck and success. We will try to make the 2009 competitions even more enthusiastic and put all the efforts in our power to make the competitions environment as much comfortable as possible for the participants.

== IranOpen 2011 ==
RoboCup IranOpen 2011 was held at Tehran International Fair from 5 - 9 April 2011. RoboCup IranOpen 2011 hosted about 350 teams from 14 countries within 22 leagues.

== IranOpen 2012 ==
RoboCup IranOpen 2012 was held at Tehran International Fair from 3 - 7 April, 2012. RoboCup IranOpen 2012 hosted 330 teams from 13 countries competing in 24 leagues.

Arian team which is led by Arash Poori participated in the competition.
