= Ayatollah Kashani Expressway =

Expressway in Tehran, Iran

Ayatollah Kashani Expressway
- بزرگراه آیت الله کاشانی
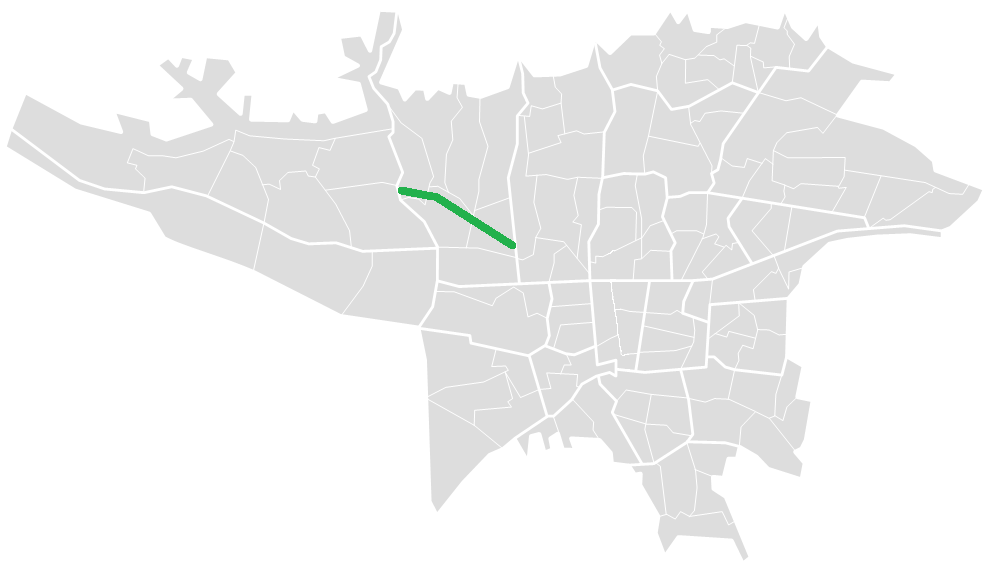

Route information
- Length: 5.3 km (3.3 mi)

Major junctions
- East end: Second Sadeghiye Square
- West end: Taavon Boulevard

Location
- Country: Iran
- Major cities: Tehran

Highway system
- Highways in Iran; Freeways

Kashani Expressway (Persian: بزرگراه کاشانی) is an expressway in eastern Tehran.

From East to West
Second Sadeghiye Square	Ashrafi Esfahani Expressway; Mohammad Ali Jenah Expressway; Sattarkhan Avenue
	Ferdows Boulevard
	Abuzar Street
Allame Jafari (Nour) Square	Hakim Expressway; Allameh Jafari Expressway; Shahid Sattari Expressway
	Shahin Boulevard South; Shaghayegh Boulevard
	Jannat Abad Boulevard
	Bakeri Expressway
	Taavon Boulevard
From West to East
