= Abshenasan Expressway =

Expressway in Tehran, Iran

Abshenasan Expressway
- بزرگراه آبشناسان
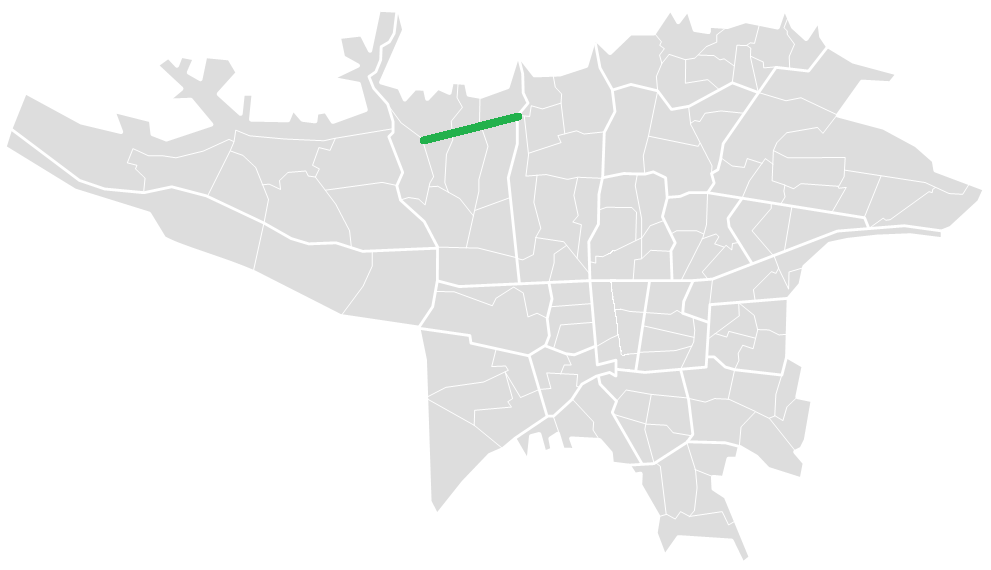

Route information
- Length: 5 km (3.1 mi)

Major junctions
- East end: Ayatollah Hashemi Rafsanjani Expressway; Ashrafi Esfahani Expressway
- West end: Sangan-Suleqan Road

Location
- Country: Iran
- Major cities: Tehran

Highway system
- Highways in Iran; Freeways

Abshenasan Expressway (Persian: بزرگراه آبشناسان), also known as Iranpars Expressway, is an expressway in northern Tehran.

It is named after Hassan Abshenasan, former commander of the 23rd Commando Division, who was killed during Iran–Iraq War.

From East to West
	Niayesh Expressway; Ashrafi Esfahani Expressway
	Sardar Jangal Boulevard
	Sattari Expressway
	Shahin Bouleverd North
	Jannat Abad Boulevard
	Bakeri Expressway
1st Shahran Square	Shahran Street
Under Construction
	Sangan-Suleqan Road
From West to East
