= Seoul Street =

Street in Tehran, Iran

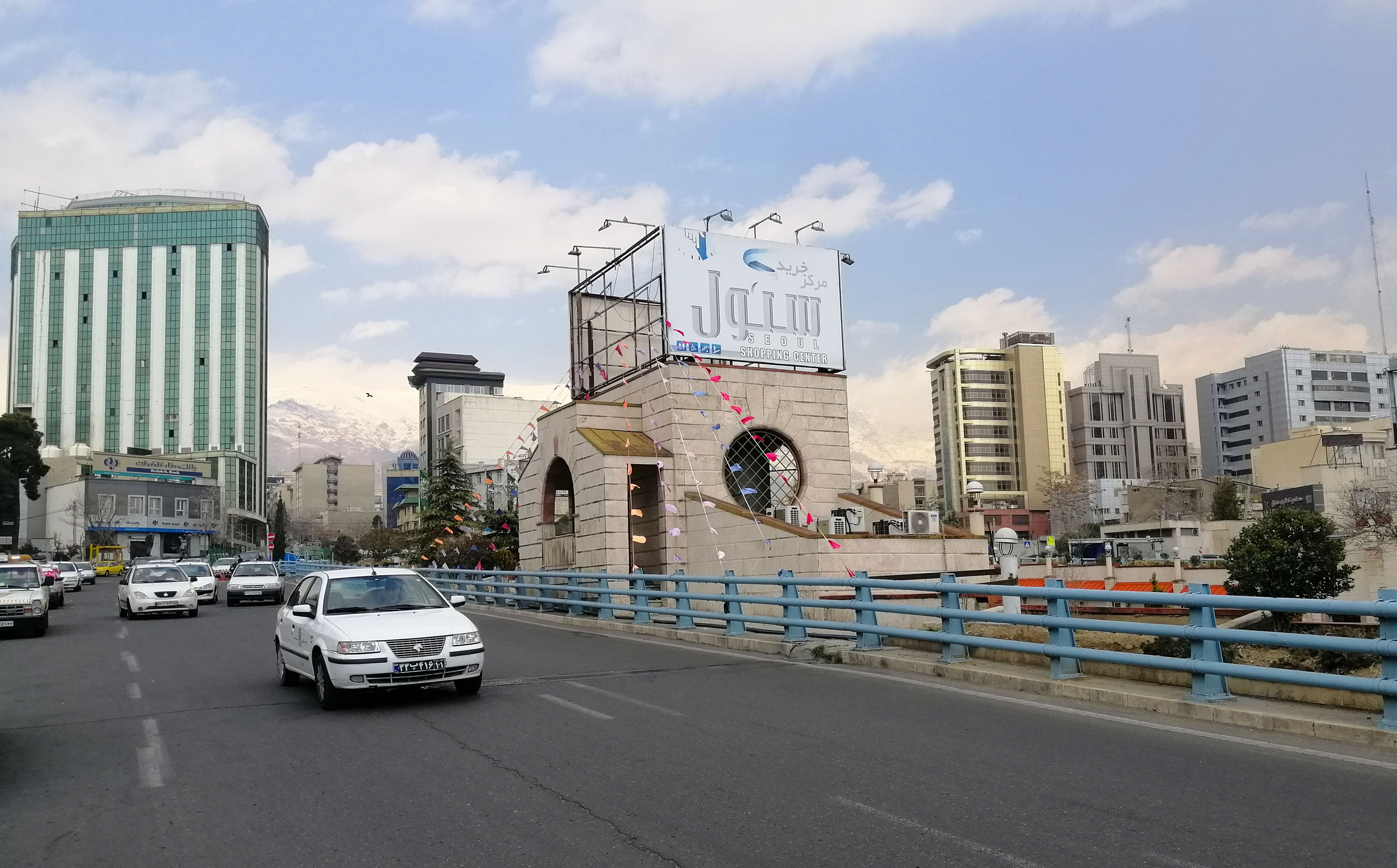
- Interactive map of Seoul Street
- Length: 3,830 m (12,570 ft)
- Width: 45 m (148 ft)
- Coordinates: 35°46′37″N 51°23′42″E
- From: Parkway Highway
- To: Vanak Street

Seoul Street (Persian: خیابان سئول) is a street that runs in the north of Tehran, Iran, close to the city's Evin district.

== Name ==
On 27 June 1977, the Seoul Metropolitan Government suggested that the cities of Seoul (the capital of South Korea) and Tehran (the capital of Iran) exchange the names of streets on the occasion of the visit to South Korea of Gholamreza Nikpey, the Mayor of Tehran. The following year, "Samneungno" street was renamed Teheran-ro (translation: Tehran Boulevard). Seoul Street's Korean counterpart then ran through a relatively underdeveloped area that had been annexed into Seoul in 1963, which then experienced phenomenal growth and waves of construction. Today, Tehran Boulevard is colloquially known as "Teheran Valley" (after Silicon Valley) due to the number of internet-related companies operating there, with Teheran-ro becoming one of the busiest streets in South Korea.

== Buildings around the street ==
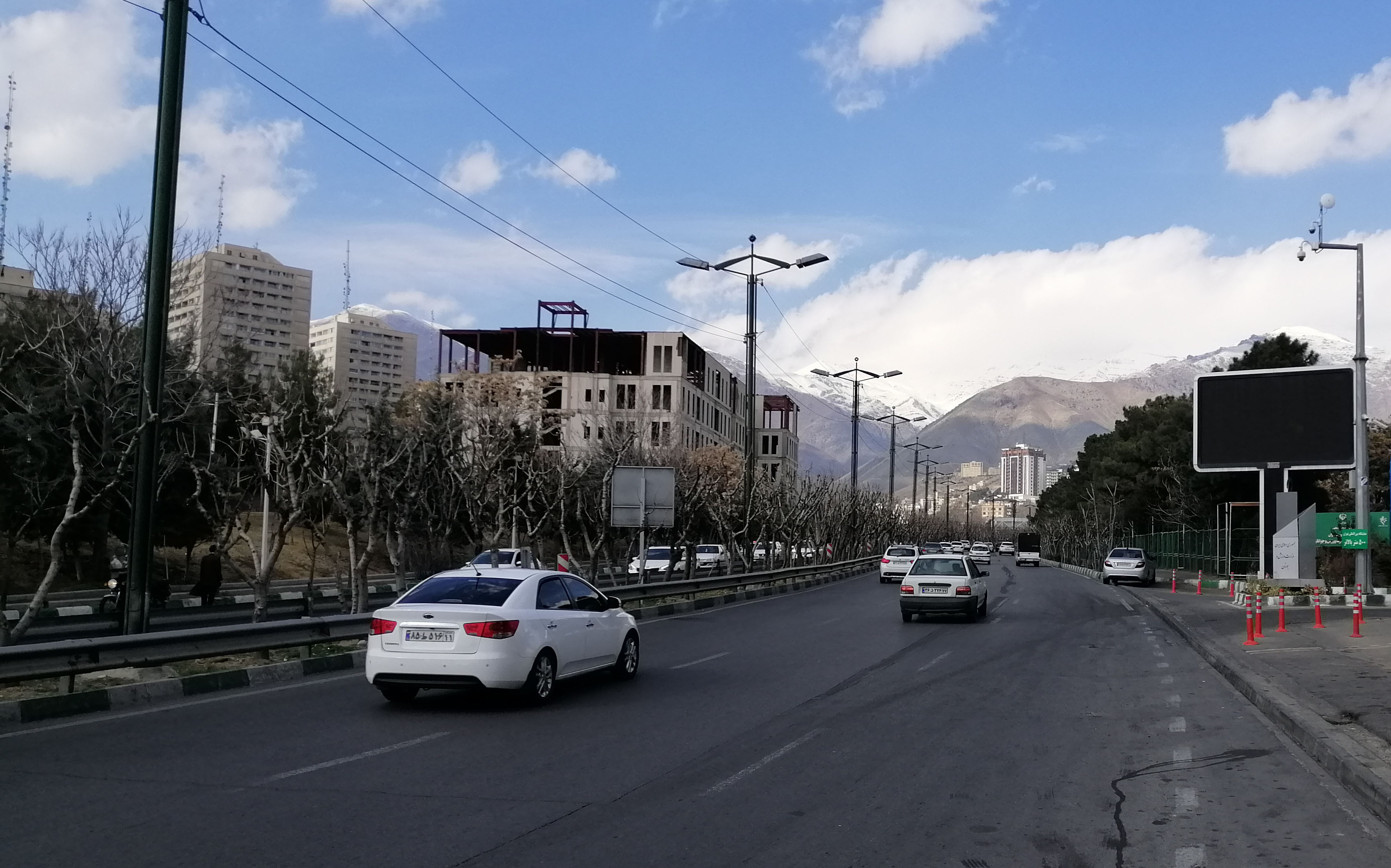

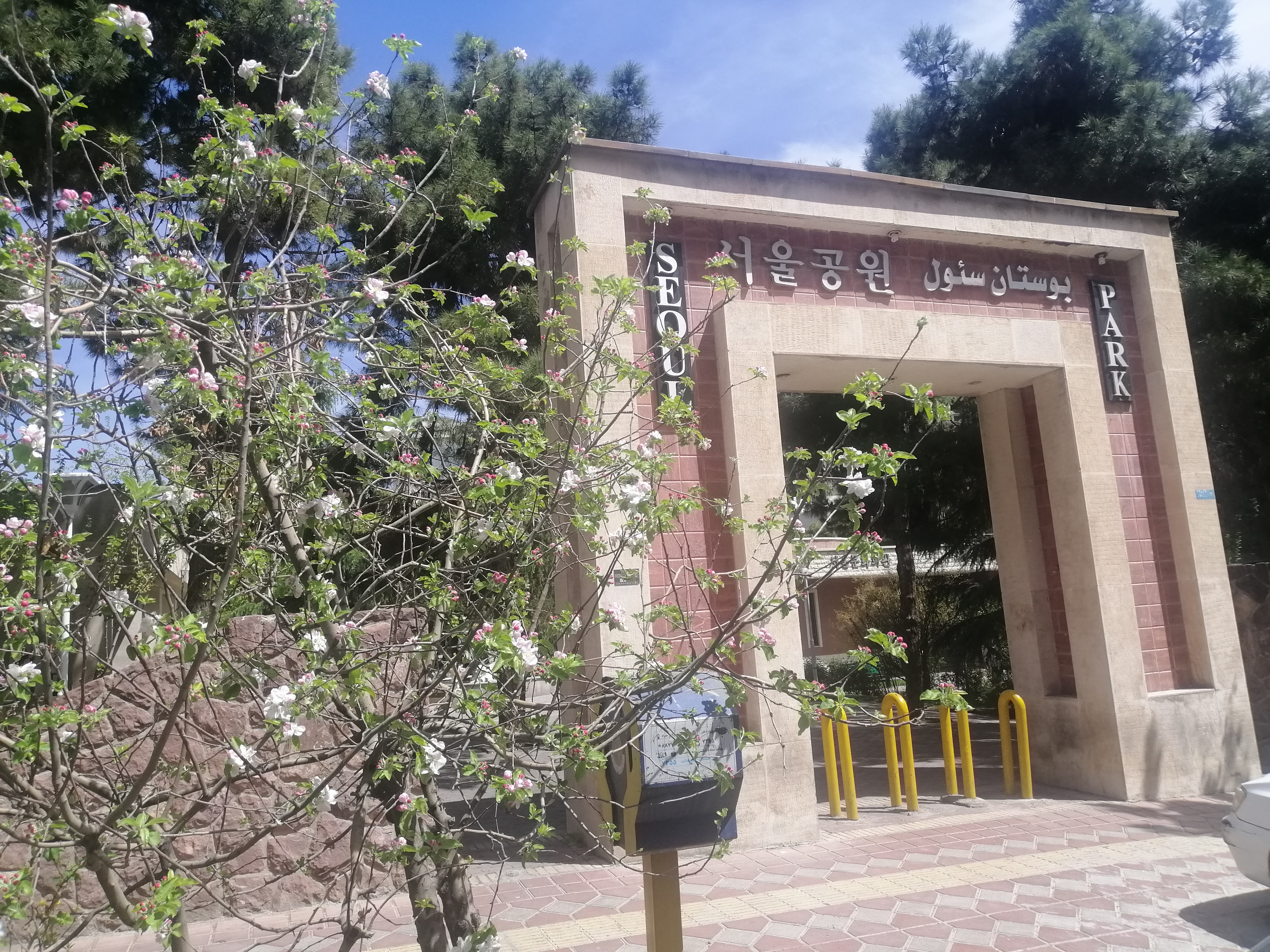
Seoul Park, near the street.

- Tehran International Exhibition
- Enghelab Sport Complex
- National Olympic Committee of the Islamic Republic of Iran
- Sheikh Bahaei Square
- ٍExploration Directorate of NIOC

== See also ==
- Teheran-ro
