= Allameh Jafari Expressway =

Expressway in Tehran, Iran

Allameh Jafari Expressway
- بزرگراه علامه جعفری
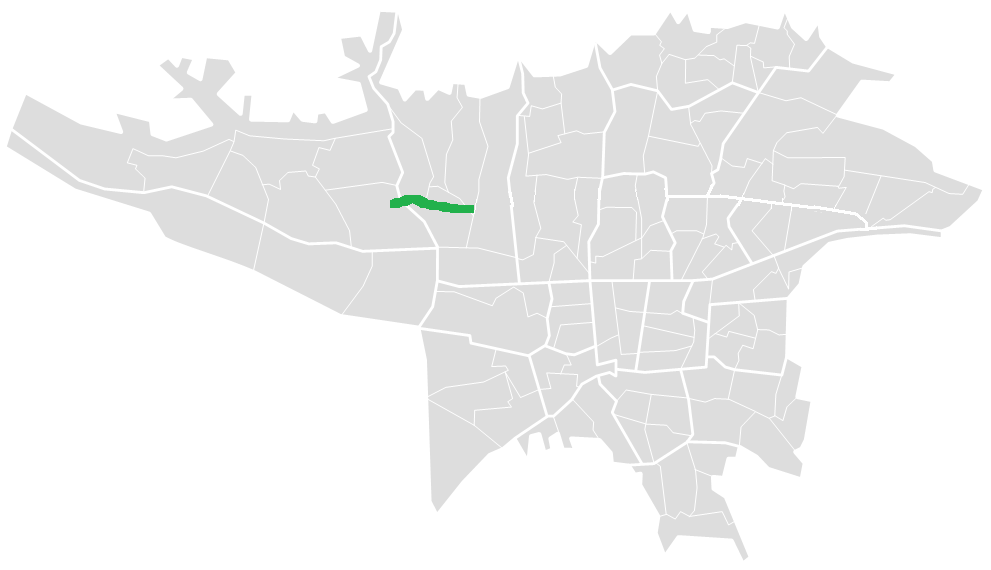

Route information
- Length: 8.5 km (5.3 mi)

Major junctions
- East end: Hakim Expressway; Shahid Sattari Expressway; Ayatollah Kashani Expressway
- West end: Azadegan Expressway

Location
- Country: Iran
- Major cities: Tehran

Highway system
- Highways in Iran; Freeways

Allameh Jafari Expressway (Persian: بزرگراه علامه جعفری) is an expressway in western Tehran. It connects the western end of Hakim Expressway to Azadi Stadium.

From East to West
Continues as Hakim Expressway
Allame Jafari (Nour) Square	Shahid Sattari Expressway; Ayatollah Kashani Expressway
	Shaghayegh Boulevard
	Bakeri Expressway
	Taavon Boulevard; Elham Boulevard
	Azadi StadiumEastern Entrance Boulevard; Olympic Village Boulevard
	Azadegan Expressway
Continues as Hamedani Expressway
From West to East
