= Kordestan Expressway =

Expressway in Tehran, Iran

Kordestan Expressway
- بزرگراه کردستان
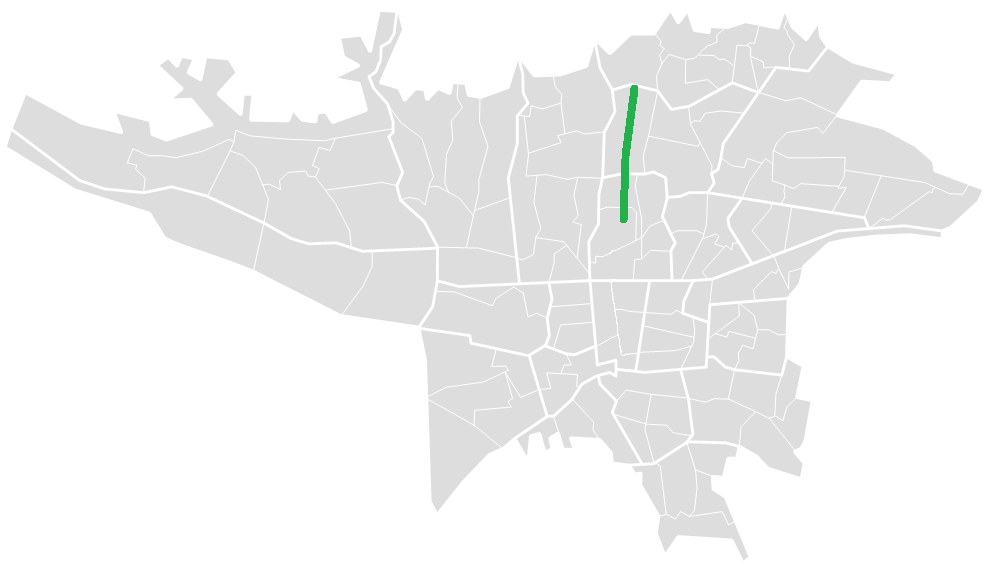

Route information
- Length: 6.5 km (4.0 mi)

Major junctions
- North end: Niayesh Expressway
- South end: Jalal-e-Ale Ahmad Expressway; Shahid Gomnam Expressway

Location
- Country: Iran
- Major cities: Tehran

Highway system
- Highways in Iran; Freeways

Kurdistan Expressway (Highway) is a North-South expressway in Tehran, Iran. It starts from Niayesh Expressway and passes Hemmat Expressway and Resalat Expressway, reaching Jala-e-Ale Ahamd Expressway and Shahid Gomnam Expressway.

From North to South
Under Construction
Niayesh Expressway
Ararat Street
Shahid Khoddami
Vanak Street
Mollasadra Street
Berezil Street
Hemmat Expressway
64th Street; Shiraz Street
Resalat Expressway; Hakim Expressway
Jalal-e-Ale Ahmad Expressway; Shahid Gomnam Expressway
From South to North

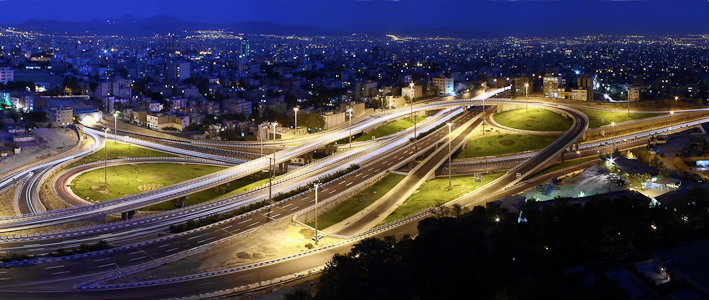
Kordestan Expressway interchange with Resalat Expressway and Hakim Expressway.

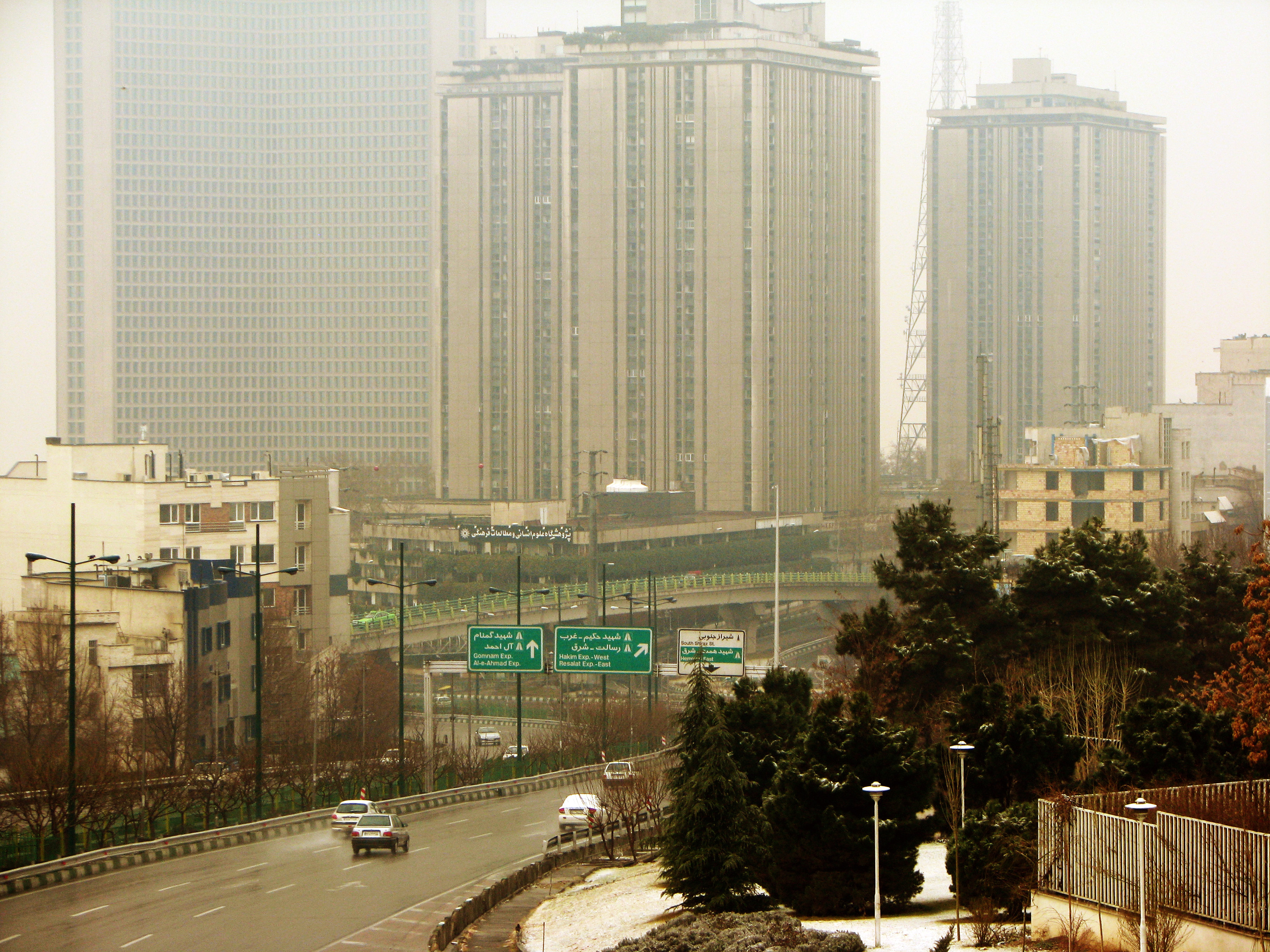
Kordestan South.

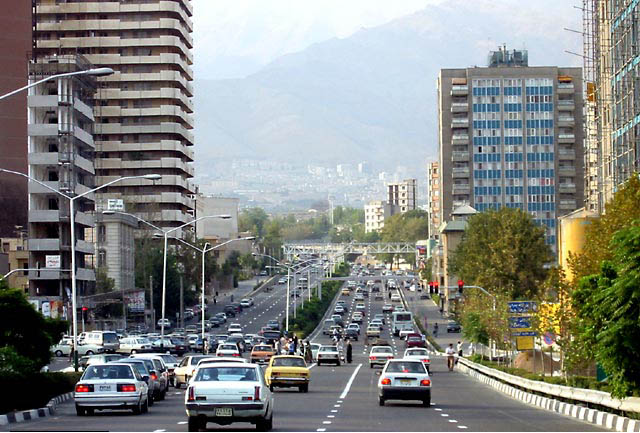
Kordestan North.
