= Iran International Exhibitions Company =

Tehran International Exhibitions
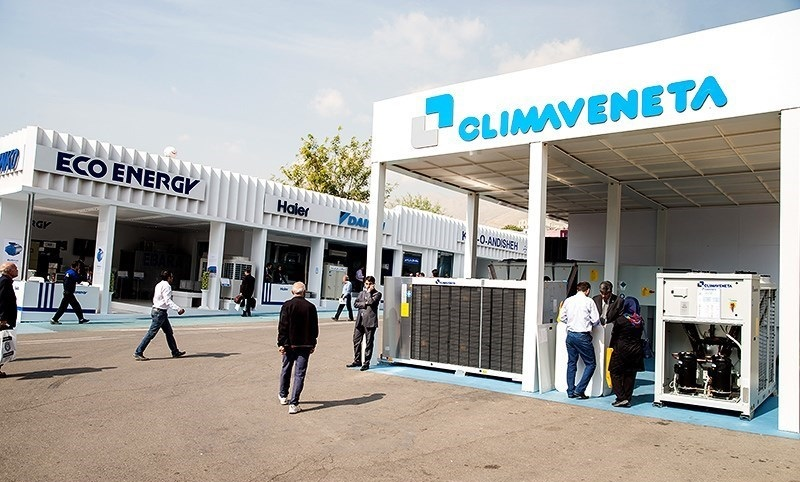
- Interactive map of Tehran International Exhibitions
- Location: Seoul Street, Chamran Expressway, Tehran; Iran
- Coordinates: 35°47′27″N 51°24′12″E
- Owner: Iran International Exhibitions Company

Construction
- Opened: 1959; 67 years ago

Website
- www.iranfair.com

The Iran International Exhibitions Company (IIEC) oversees and operates all international and specialized exhibitions held in Iran. Site features exhibitions calendar and provides trade laws and regulations. IIEC is affiliated with the Ministry of Industry, Mine and Trade. IIEC is located at the Tehran permanent fairground.

== See also ==
- IBTour.ir
- Tehran International Book Fair
- Economy of Iran
- Tourism in Iran
- List of convention and exhibition centers in Iran
