= Mohammad Ali Jenah Expressway =

Expressway in Tehran, Iran

Mohammad Ali Jenah Expressway
- بزرگراه محمدعلی جناح
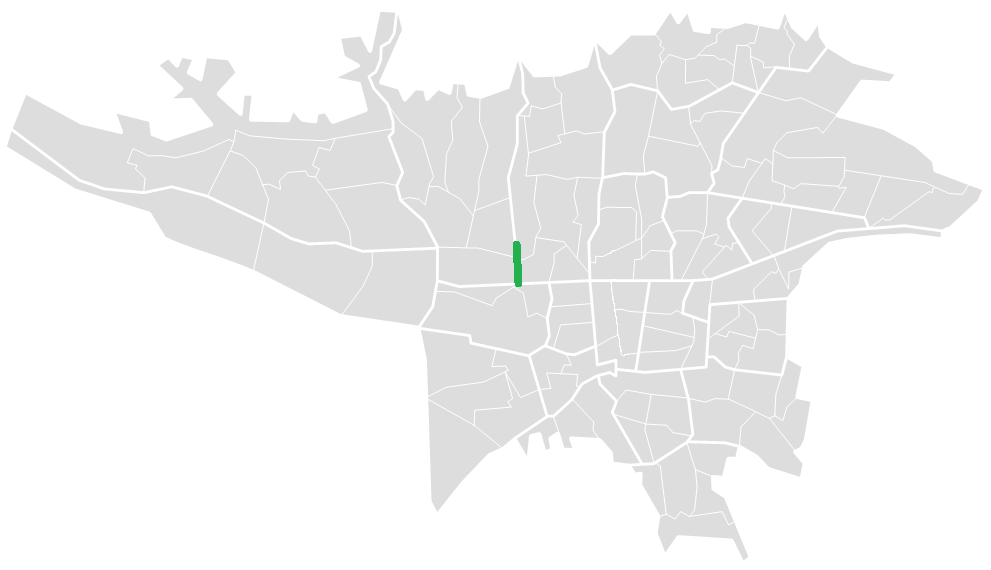

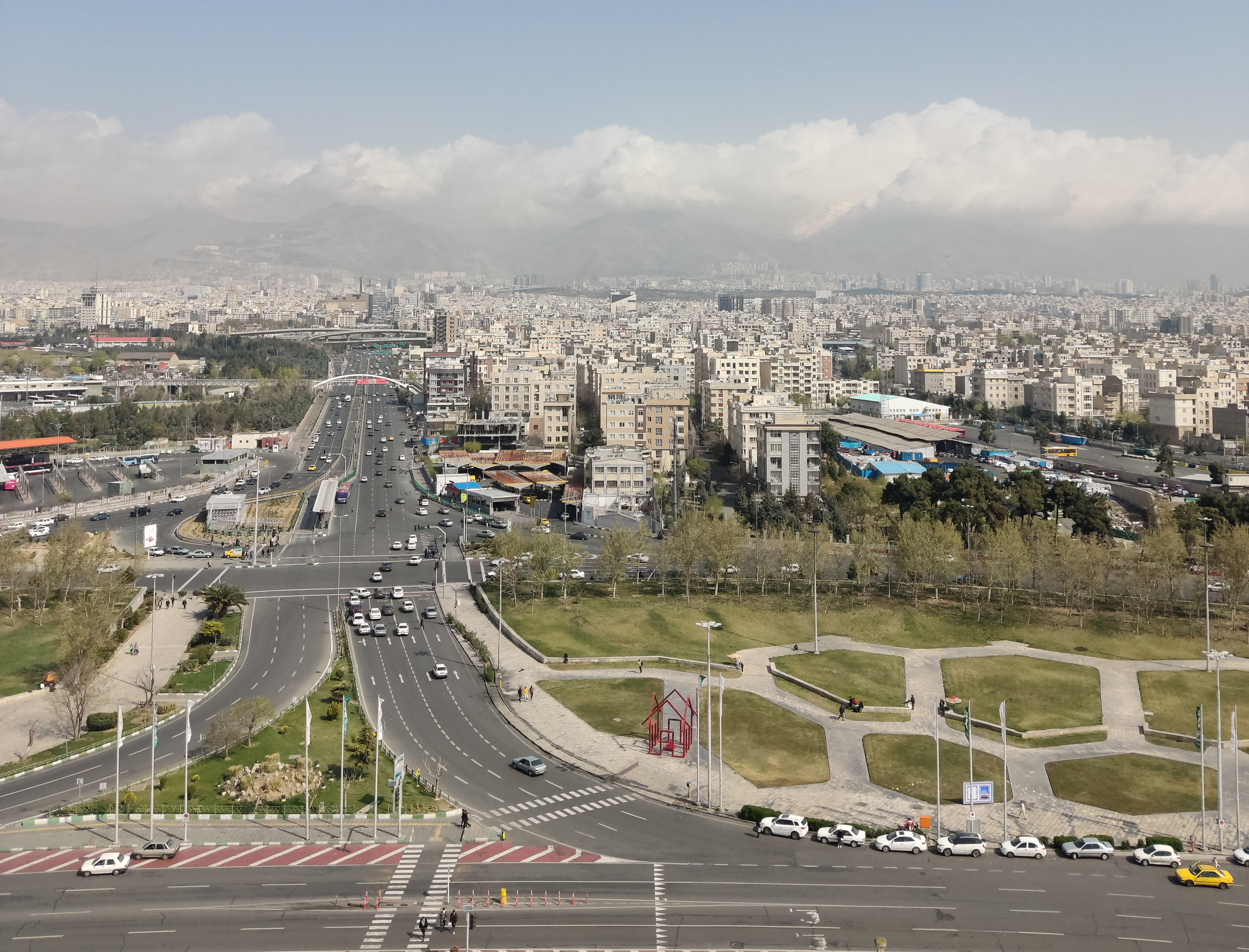
- The Expressway in 2022

Route information
- Length: 2.5 km (1.6 mi)

Major junctions
- North end: Second Sadeghiye Square
- South end: Azadi Square

Location
- Country: Iran
- Major cities: Tehran

Highway system
- Highways in Iran; Freeways

Mohammad Ali Jenah Expressway is a short expressway in Tehran, Iran. It connects Second Sadeghiye Square to Azadi Square. The expressway is named after the founder and first Governor General of Pakistan Muhammad Ali Jinnah.

From North to South
Second Sadeghiye Square	Ashrafi Esfahani Expressway; Ayatollah Kashani Expressway; Sattarkhan Boulevard
	Shahid Golabi Street
	Sadeghieh (Tehran) Metro Station
	Tehran-Karaj Freeway; Sheikh Fazl-allah Nouri Expressway
	Salehi Street
	Tehran Western Bus Terminal
	Tehran BRT Line Azadi Square Station
Azadi Square	Saidi Expressway; Karaj special Road; Azadi Street
From South to North
