= Sheikh Bahaei Square =

Square in Tehran, Iran

Coordinates: 35°45′56.93″N 51°23′43.56″E

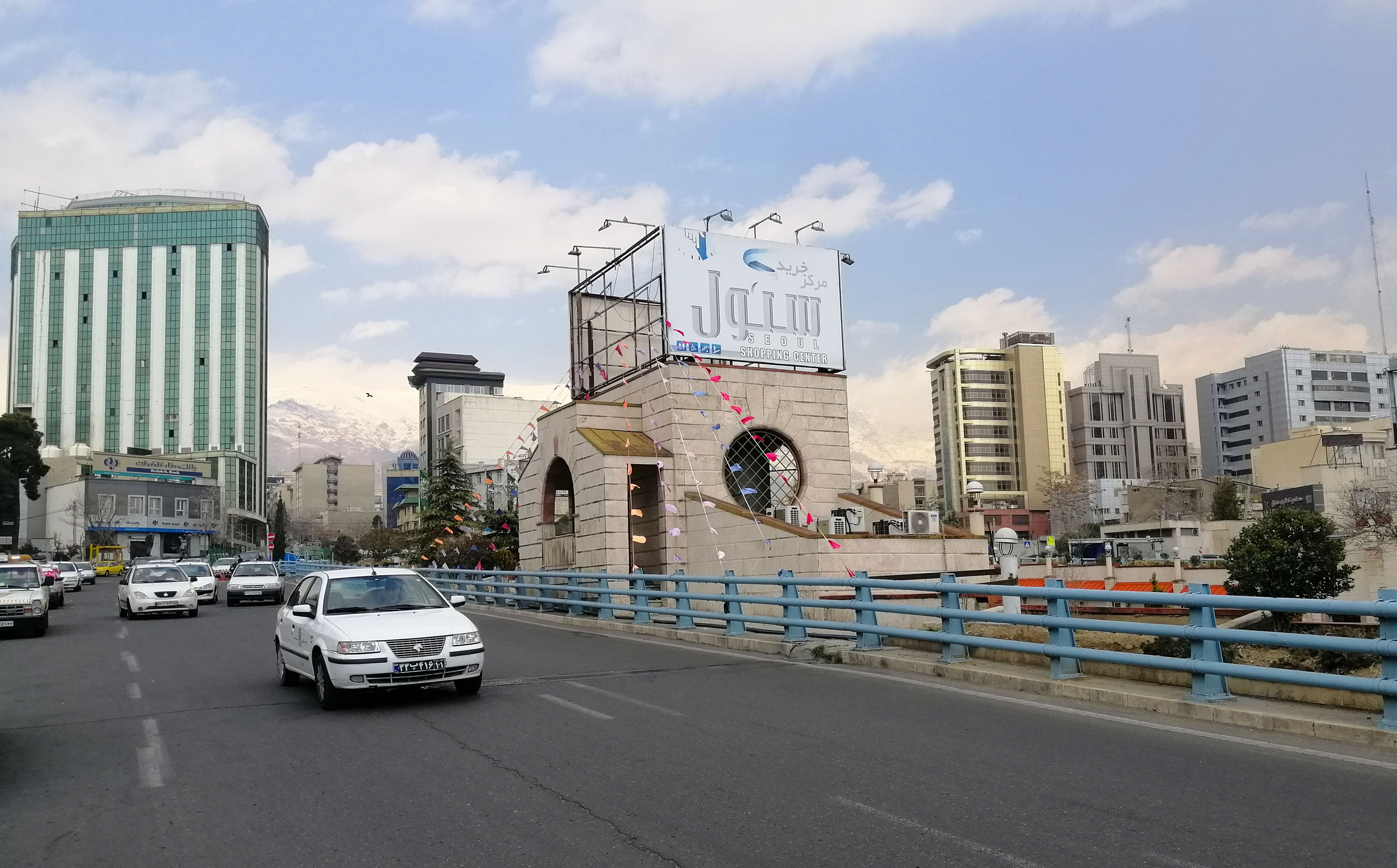

Sheikh Bahaei Square is in the Vanak area of the Iranian capital, Tehran.

== Notable places ==
Iran's National Oil and Gas company has two of its headquarters around the square.
