= Ashrafi Esfahani Expressway =

Expressway in Tehran, Iran

Ashrafi Esfahani Expressway
- بزرگراه اشرفی اصفهانی
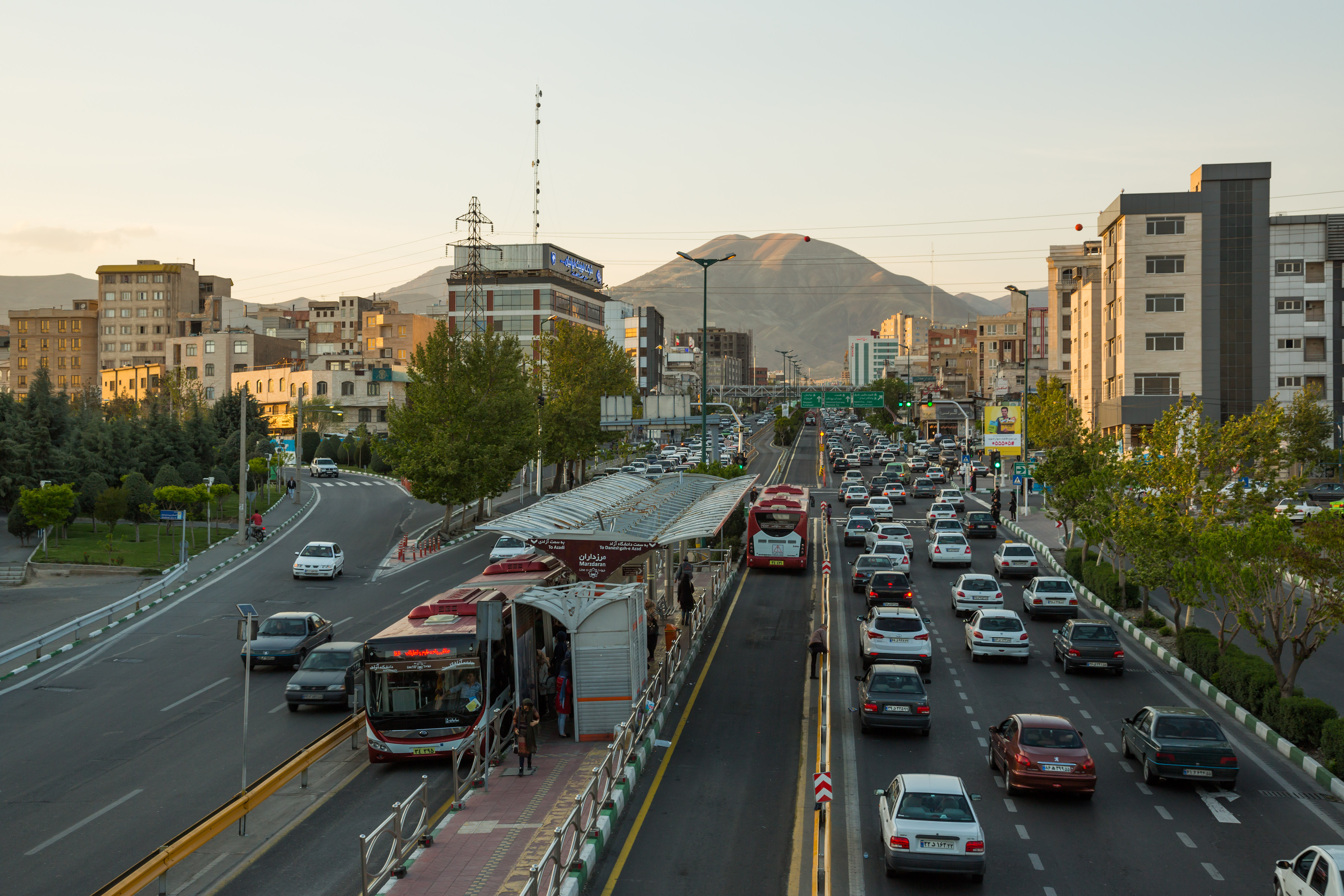

Route information
- Length: 6.3 km (3.9 mi)

Major junctions
- North end: Simon Bolivar Boulevard
- South end: Second Sadeghiye Square

Location
- Country: Iran
- Major cities: Tehran

Highway system
- Highways in Iran; Freeways

Ashrafi Esfahani Expressway (Highway) is an expressway in Tehran which runs North-South from Hesarak Road to Second Sadeghiye Square. It passes Punak, Hemmat, Qasem Soleimani and Jalale Ale Ahmad.

From North to South
	Simon Bolivar Boulevard
	Taleqani Street
	Niayesh Expressway; Abshenasan Expressway
Punak Square	Mirza Babaei Street; Hamila Street
	Mokhberi Street
	Hemmat Expressway
U-Turn
	Hakim Expressway
	Marzdaran Boulevard
	Jalal-e-Ale Ahmad Expressway
	Sazman-e-Ab Street; Ferdows Boulevard
Second Sadeghiye Square	Mohammad Ali Jenah Expressway; Ayatollah Kashani Expressway; Sattarkhan Avenue
From South to North
