= Yadegar-e-Emam Expressway =

Road in western Tehran

Yadegaran Expressway

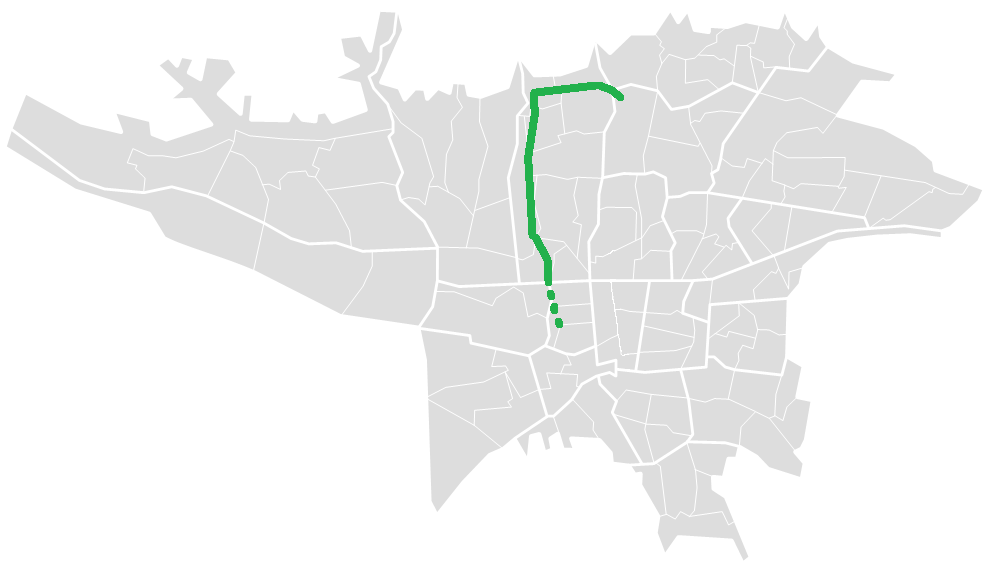

Route information
- Length: 15.1 km (9.4 mi)

Major junctions
- North end: Seoul Street; Chamran Expressway
- South end: U-Turn

Location
- Country: Iran
- Major cities: Tehran

Highway system
- Highways in Iran; Freeways

Yadegar-e-Emam Expressway is in western Tehran. Yadegar-e-Emam means Memorial of Imam in Persian. It starts from Evin and goes a few kilometers to the west, then turns south and ends in Azadi Avenue.

From North to South
	Seoul Street; Chamran Expressway
	Shohada-ye-Sherkat-e-Barq Street
	Saadat Abad Boulevard
	Payam Boulevard
	Farahzadi Boulevard
Filling Station
	Kuhestan Street
	Niayesh Expressway
	Punak Boulevard
	Eyvanak Boulevard
	Hemmat Expressway
	Hakim Expressway
	Marzdaran Boulevard
	Isar Boulevard
	Jalal-e-Ale Ahmad Expressway
	Sazman-e-Ab Street
	Sattarkhan Avenue
	Sheikh Fazl-allah Nouri Expressway
	Sohravard Street
	Azadi Street
U-Turn
(Local lane only)	Shahidan Street
(Local lane only)	Dampzeshki Street
(Local lane only)	Hashemi Street
	Imam Khomeini Street
(Local lane only)	Dastgheib Street
Under Construction
From West to East
