= Jalal-e-Ale Ahmad Expressway =

Expressway in Tehran, Iran

Jalal-e-Al-e-Ahmad Expressway
- بزرگراه جلال آل احمد
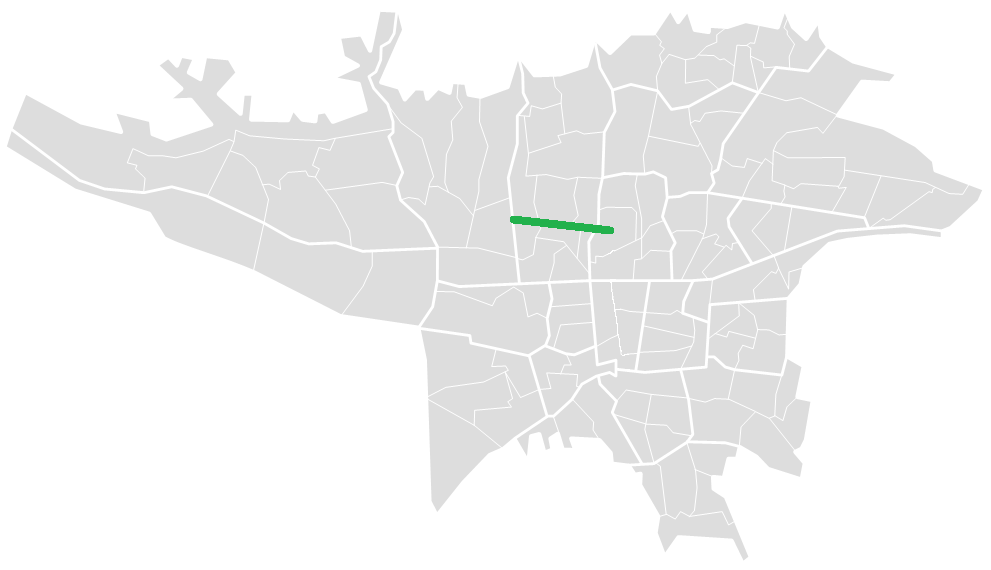

Route information
- Length: 5.5 km (3.4 mi)

Major junctions
- East end: Shahid Gomnam Expressway; Kordestan Expressway
- West end: Ashrafi Esfahani Expressway

Location
- Country: Iran
- Major cities: Tehran

Highway system
- Highways in Iran; Freeways

Jalal-e-Al-e-Ahmad Expressway is an expressway in Tehran. It starts from the end of Kordestan Expressway and Shahid Gomnam Expressway. It passes Chamran Expressway, Sheikh Fazl-allah Nouri Expressway and Yadegar Expressway and reaches Ashrafi Esfahani Expressway.

From East to West
| Shahid Gomnam Expressway; Kordestan Expressway |
| Kargar Street |
| Chamran Expressway |
| Nasr Boulevard |
| Sheikh Fazl-allah Nouri Expressway |
| Janbazan Street |
| Danesh Street |
| Yadegar-e-Emam Expressway |
| Ashrafi Esfahani Expressway |
From West to East
