= Shahid Gomnam Expressway =

Expressway in Tehran, Iran

Shahid-e-Gomnam Expressway
- بزرگراه شهید گمنام
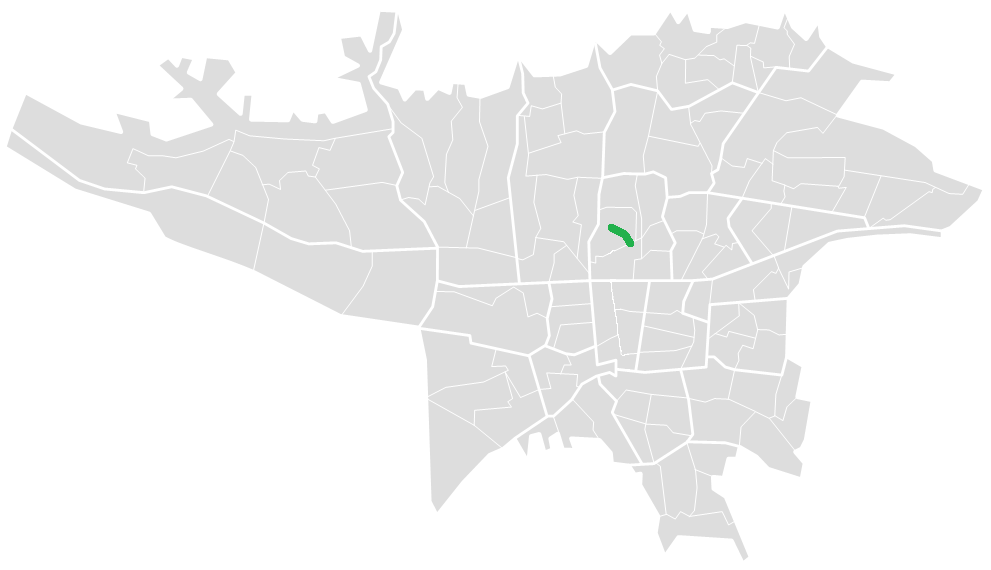

Route information
- Length: 1 km (0.62 mi)

Major junctions
- North end: Kordestan Expressway; Jalal-e-Ale Ahmad Expressway
- South end: Fatemi Square

Location
- Country: Iran
- Major cities: Tehran

Highway system
- Highways in Iran; Freeways

Shahid Gomnam Expressway is an expressway in central Tehran. It connects the Jalal-e-Ale Ahmad Expressway to Fatemi Square.

From North to South
	Kordestan Expressway; Jalal-e-Ale Ahmad Expressway
	Kaj Street
No Entry from North to South
Fatemi Square	Fatemi Street; Felestin Street
From South to North
