= Hashemi Rafsanjani Expressway =

Expressway in Tehran, Iran

Hashemi Rafsanjani Expressway
- بزرگراه آیت الله هاشمی رفسنجانی
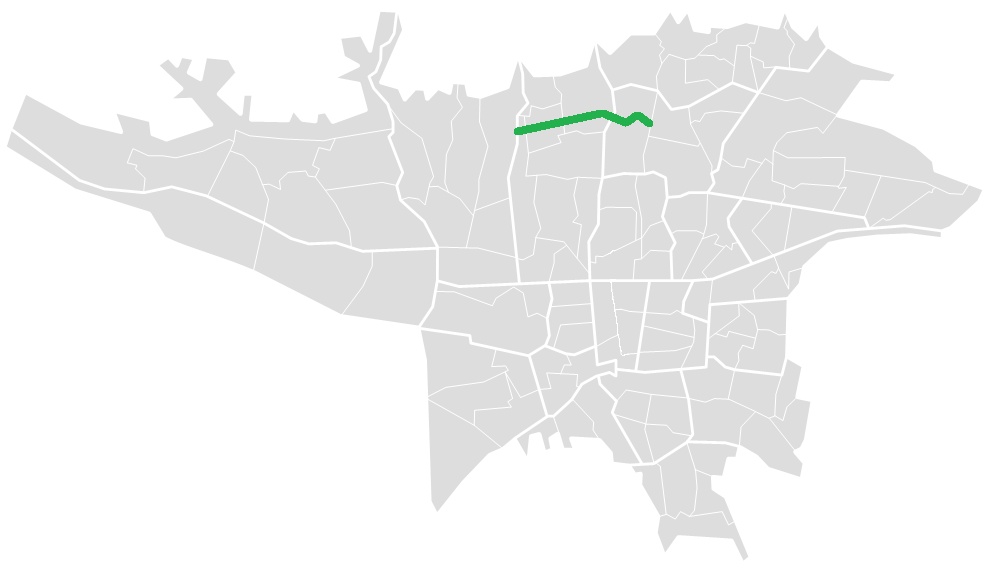

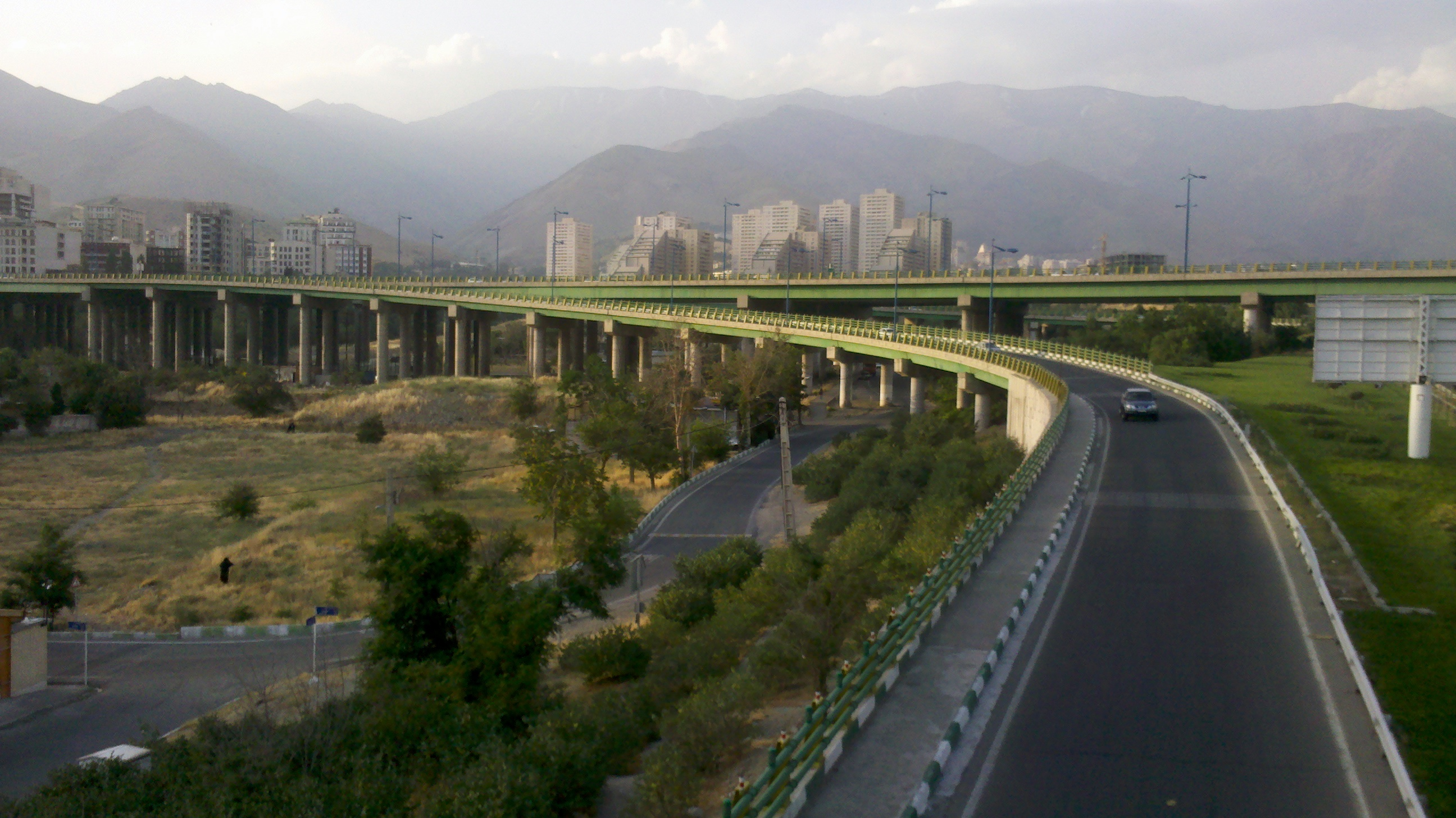

Route information
- Length: 7.3 km (4.5 mi)

Major junctions
- East end: Valiasr Street
- West end: Abshenasan Expressway; Ashrafi Esfahani Expressway

Location
- Country: Iran

Highway system
- Highways in Iran; Freeways

Hashemi Rafsanjani Expressway (Persian: بزرگراه هاشمی رفسنجانی), Also known as Niyayesh Expressway (Persian: بزرگراه نیایش) is an expressway is northern central Tehran, Iran. It starts from Valiasr Street and becomes Abshenasan Expressway after the interchange with Ashrafi Esfahani Expressway. On its way, Hashemi Rafsanjani Expressway passes Kordestan Expressway, Chamran Expressway and Yadegar-e-Emam Expressway. The eastern terminus of this expressway is connected to Sadr Expressway by a tunnel.

From East to West
Valiasr Street
Arash Tunnel (One-way)
Kordestan Expressway
Niayesh Tunnel
Seoul Street
Chamran Expressway
Farhang Street
Saadat Abad Street
Shahid Paknejad Boulevard
Shahid Farahzadi Street
Yadegar-e-Emam Expressway
Ashrafi Esfahani Expressway; Abshenasan Expressway
From West to East
