= Hakim Expressway =

Road in Tehran, Iran

Ayatollah Hakim Expressway
- بزرگراه آیت الله حکیم
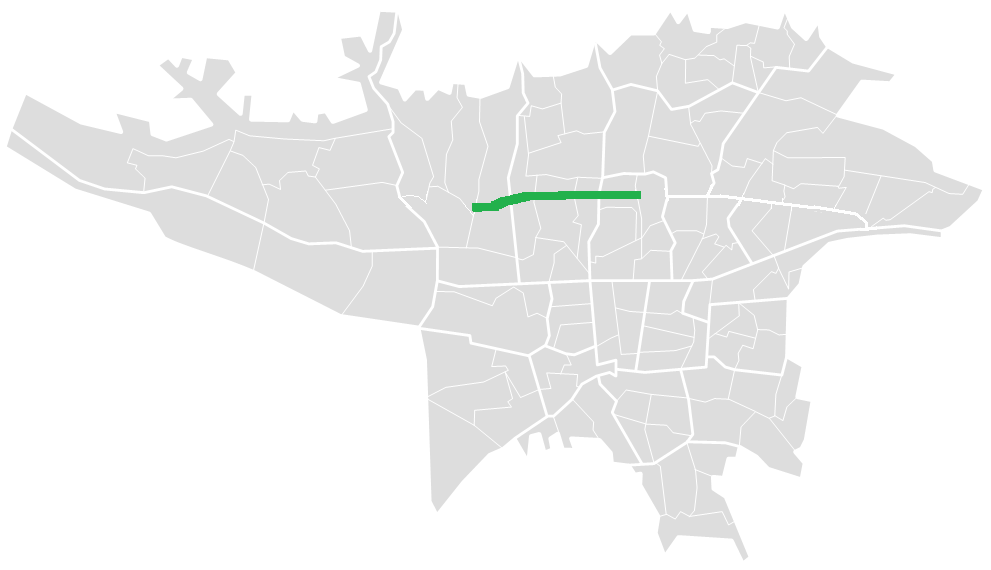

Route information
- Length: 8.5 km (5.3 mi)

Major junctions
- East end: Resalat Expressway; Kordestan Expressway
- West end: Allameh Jafari Expressway; Shahid Sattari Expressway; Ayatollah Kashani Expressway

Location
- Country: Iran
- Major cities: Tehran

Highway system
- Highways in Iran; Freeways

Hakim Expressway starts from the junction of Resalat Expressway and Kordestan Expressway after Resalat Tunnel and ends in Allame Jafari (Nour) Square. It is part of Resalat Expressway before renaming some parts to Hakim and Allameh Jafari.

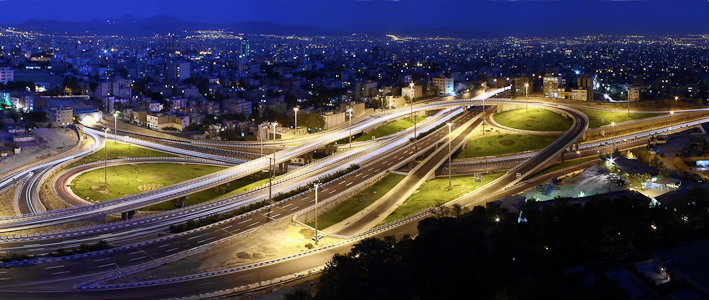
Kordestan Expressway interchange with Resalat Expressway and Hakim Expressway

From East to West
Continues as Resalat Expressway
	Kordestan Expressway
	Sheikh Bahai Avenue
	Kargar Street
	Chamran Expressway
	Sheikh Fazl-allah Nouri Expressway
	Yadegar-e-Emam Expressway
	Laleh Street
	Ashrafi Esfahani Expressway
Allame Jafari (Nour) Square	Ayatollah Kashani Expressway; Shahid Sattari Expressway
Continues as Allameh Jafari Expressway
From West to East
