= Hemmat Expressway =

Expressway in Tehran, Iran

Shahid Hemmat Expressway

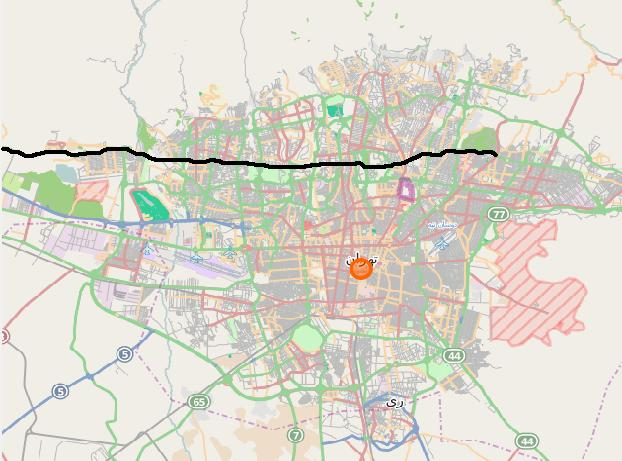

Route information
- Length: 18 km (11 mi)

Major junctions
- East end: Zeinoddin Expressway; Pasdaran Street; Shariati Street
- West end: Kharrazi Expressway

Location
- Country: Iran
- Major cities: Tehran

Highway system
- Highways in Iran; Freeways

Hemmat Expressway is a route in Tehran, Iran. It starts from Pasdaran Avenue junction and goes west. It passes Haghani Expressway, Kordestan Expressway, Milad Tower, Ashrafi Esfahani Expressway and Ziba Shahr in Western Tehran and ends into an intersection with Azadegan Expressway and Tehran-Shomal Freeway.

It is named after Iran-Iraq war hero Mohammad Ebrahim Hemmat.

From East to West
Continues as Zeinoddin Expressway
	Pasdaran Street; Shariati Street
	Shahid Haghani Expressway (Note: Westbound exit limited to Northbound Haghani only)
Shahid Hemmat Metro Station
Fajr Interchange	Modares Expressway
	Africa Boulevard (Note: Westbound Entrance from Northbound Africa, Eastboud exit to Northbound Africa)
	Gandhi Street (Note: Eastbound exit only)
	Kordestan Expressway; Shahid Abbaspoor(Tavanir) Street
Sheikh Bahaei Interchange	Sheikh Bahaei Street
	Chamran Expressway
	Sheikh Fazl-allah Nouri Expressway
	Yadegar-e-Emam Expressway
	Ashrafi Esfahani Expressway
	Sardar Jangal Boulevard
	Shahid Sattari Expressway
	Shahin Boulevard North-South
	Jannat Abad Boulevard
	Bakeri Expressway
	Shahran Avenue
	Olympic Village Boulevard
	Azadegan Expressway; Tehran-Shomal Freeway
Continues as Kharazzi Expressway
From West to East

Source:|OpenStreetMap Contributions

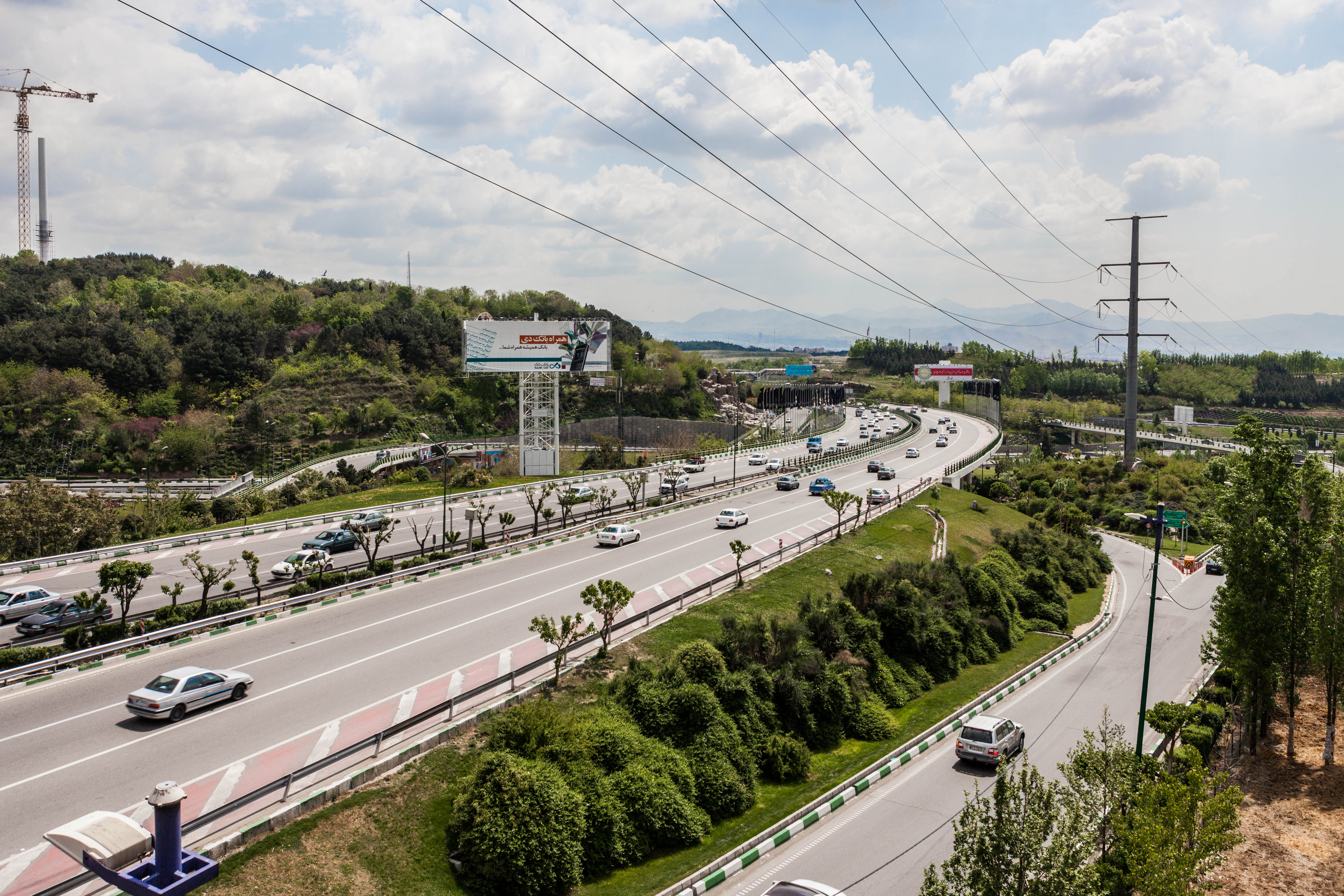
Hemmat Expressway, Abbas Abad.

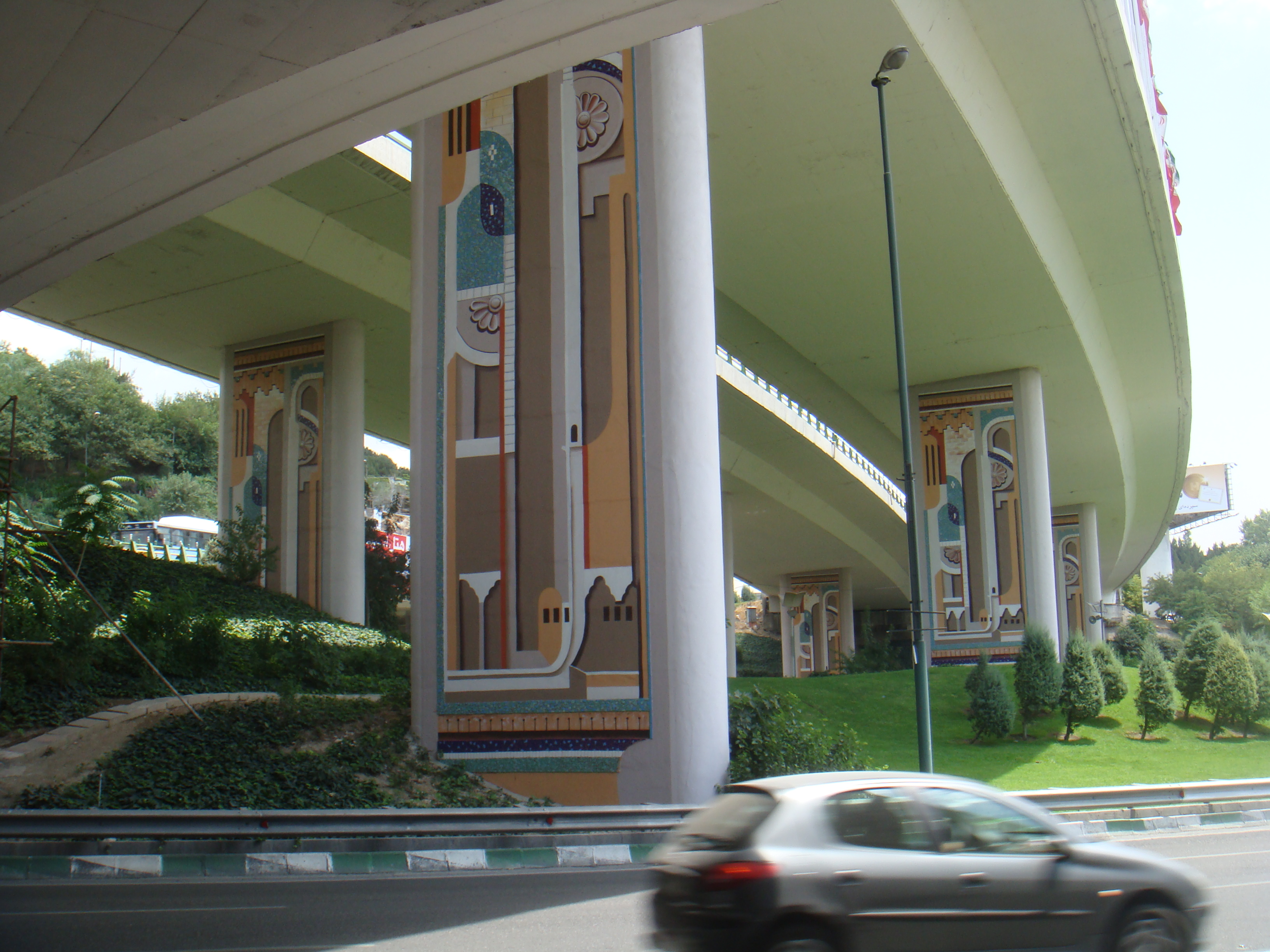
Hemmat Underpass.
