= Shahid Sattari Expressway =

Expressway in Tehran, Iran

Shahid Sattari Expressway
- بزرگراه شهید ستّاری
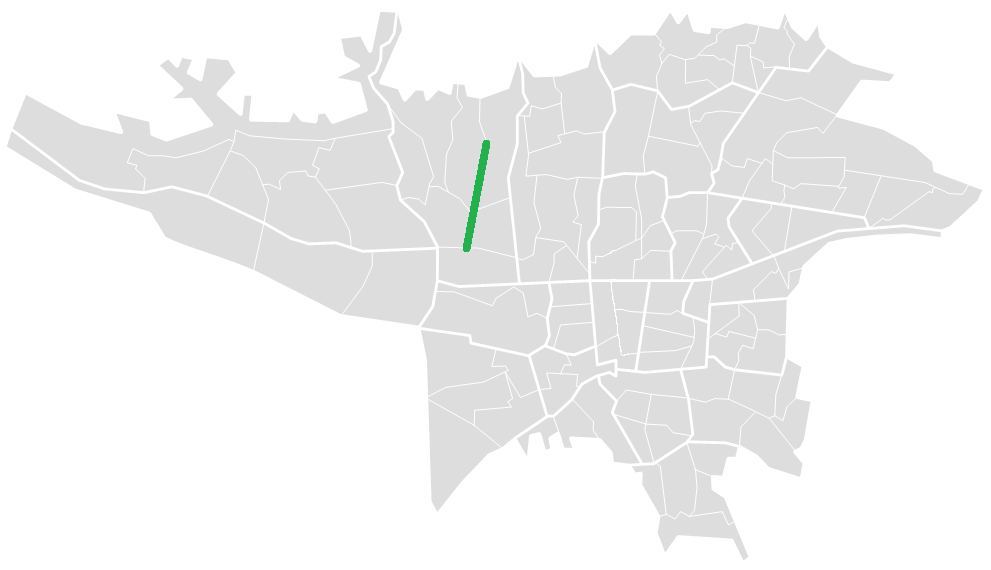

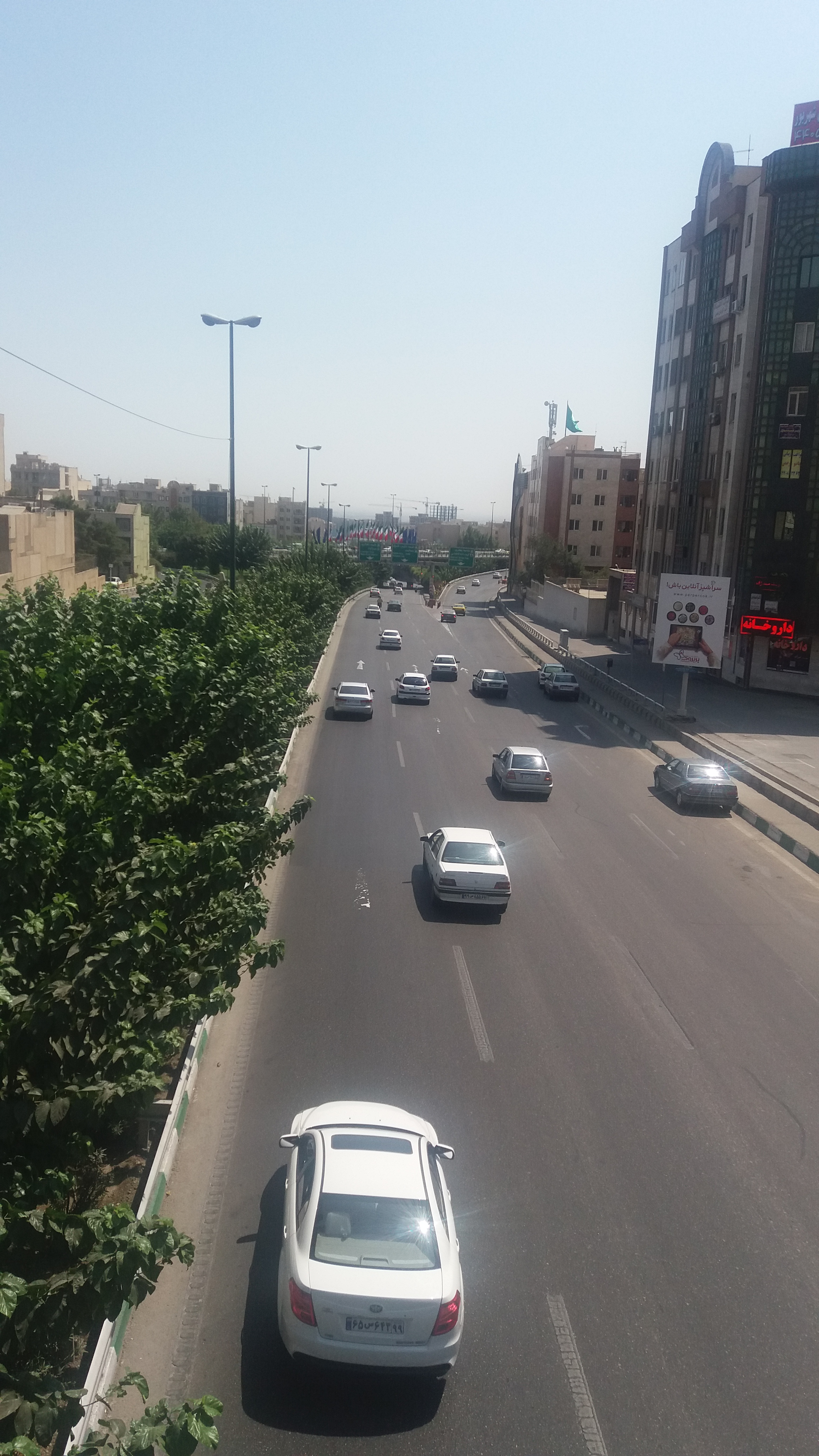

Route information
- Length: 6.5 km (4.0 mi)

Major junctions
- North end: Abshenasan Expressway
- South end: Tehran-Karaj Freeway; Ekbatan Entrance Boulevard

Location
- Country: Iran
- Major cities: Tehran

Highway system
- Highways in Iran; Freeways

Shahid Sattari Expressway (Nur) (Persian: بزرگراه شهید ستّاری (نور)) is from Iranpars Expressway to Tehran-Karaj Freeway.

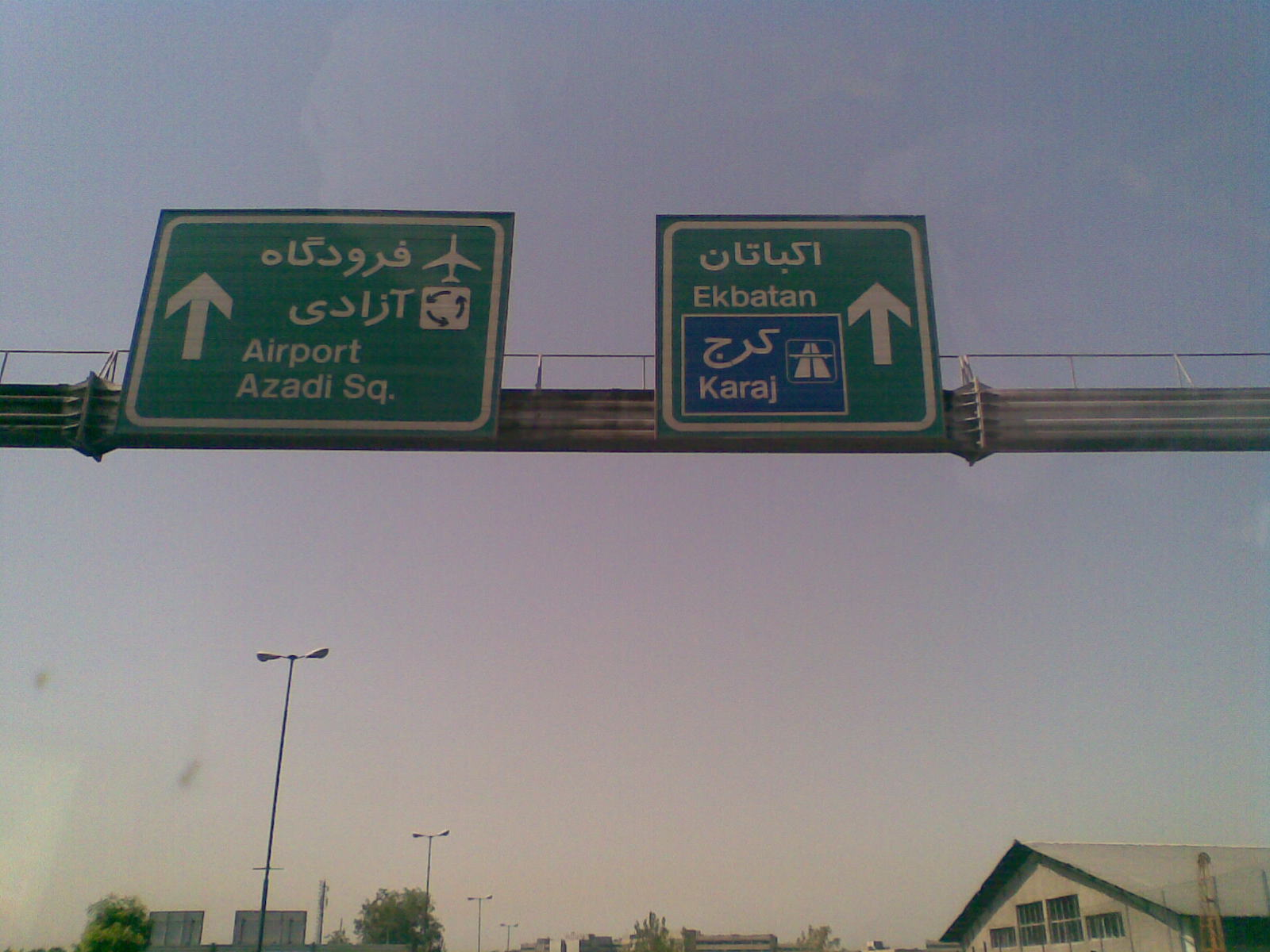
Sattari South directions

From North to south
Daneshgah-e Azad Square	Simon Bolivar Boulvard; Shohada-ye Hesarak Boulvard
	Abshenasan Expressway
	Mirza Babaei Street
	Mokhberi Street
	Hemmat Expressway
	Laleh Boulevard
Allame Jafari (Nour) Square	Hakim Expressway; Allameh Jafari Expressway; Ayatollah Kashani Expressway
U-Turn
	Ferdows Boulevard
U-Turn
	Tehran-Karaj Freeway
	1st Hegmataneh Street
	2nd Hegmataneh Street
	Lashghari Expressway
From South to North
