= Chamran Expressway =

Expressway in Tehran, Iran

Chamran Expressway
- بزرگراه چمران
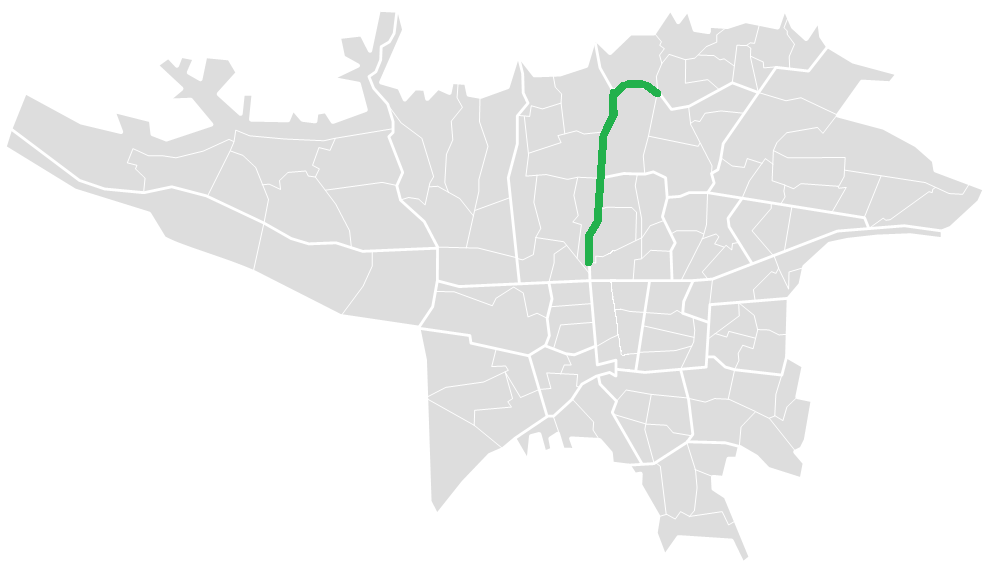

Route information
- Length: 11.5 km (7.1 mi)

Major junctions
- North end: Modares Expressway; Valiasr Street
- South end: Tohid Tunnel

Location
- Country: Iran
- Major cities: Tehran

Highway system
- Highways in Iran; Freeways

Shahid Chamran Expressway (Persian: بزرگراه شهید چمران), Also known as Parkway Expressway (Persian: بزرگراه پارک‌وی) is an expressway in Tehran, Iran, leading from Tohid Square to Parkway Junction. Chamran is the oldest expressway in Tehran, and is unofficially called Parkway Expressway or just Parkway for short. The expressway is named after Mostafa Chamran.

As of August 2007, main intersections of Chamran Expressway, from south to north, include dissecting Bagher Khan Street, passing under Jalal-e-Ale Ahmad Expressway at Nasr Bridge, passing under Resalat Expressway and then Hemmat Expressway, and passing under Niayesh Expressway at Velayat Bridge. It changes its direction to west-east near Seoul Street.

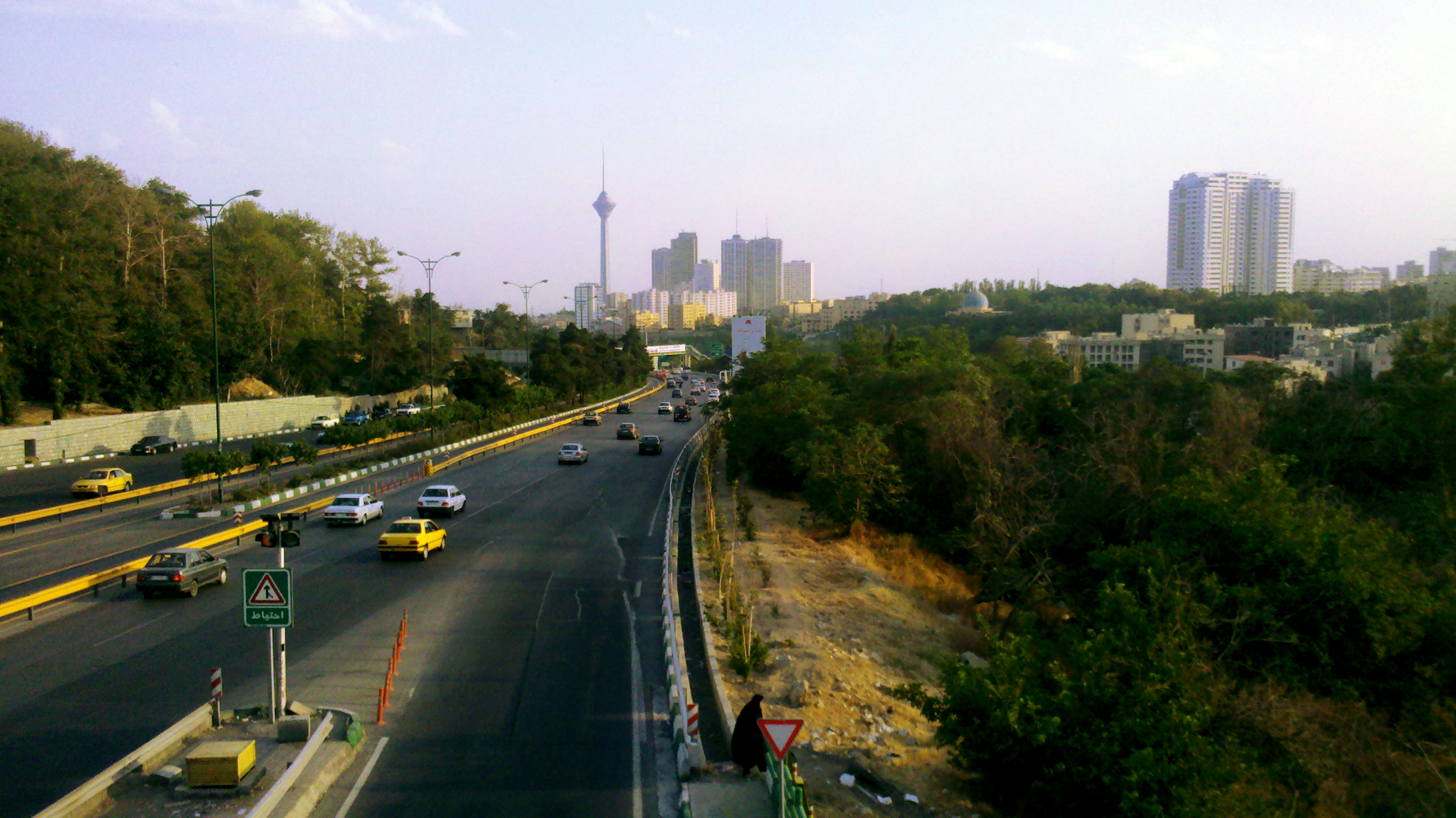
South face view of Chamran Expressway

From North to South
	Modares Expressway; Valiasr Street
Tehran BRT Line Afsharian Terminus Station
U-Turn
	Tehran International Fair
	Tabnak Street
Tehran BRT Line Tabnak Station
U-Turn
Tehran BRT Line International Fair Station
	Yadegar-e-Emam Expressway
Tehran BRT Line Ati Saz Station
Velayat Interchange	Ayatollah Hashemi Rafsanjani Expressway
Tehran BRT Line Modiriat Station
	Modiriyat Street
Tehran BRT Line Molla Sadra Station
Mollasadra-Chamran; Interchange	Mollasadra Street
	Hemmat Expressway
	Hakim Expressway
U-Turn
Tehran BRT Line Jalal-e Ale Ahmad Station
	Jalal-e-Ale Ahmad Expressway
	Tohid Tunnel
U-Turn
	Bagherkhan Street
Tohid Square	Sattarkhan Street Tohid Street; Nosrat Street
From South to North

== Pictures ==
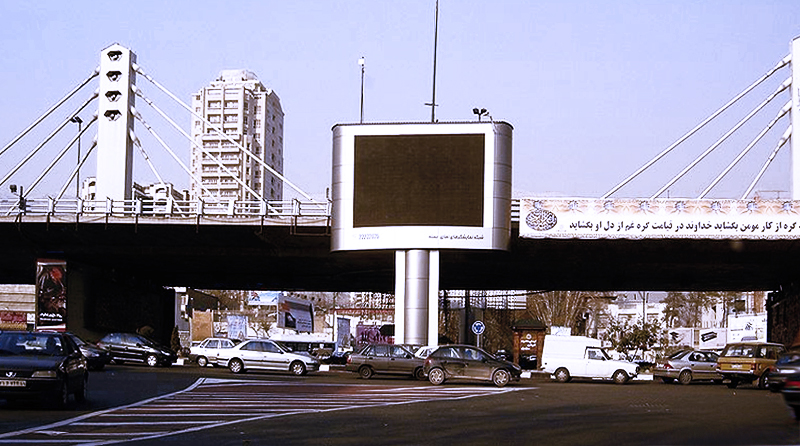
Chamran Expressway intersection with Valiasr Street at Parkway Junction
