= Bakeri Expressway =

Expressway in Tehran, Iran

Coordinates: 35°44′45.1″N 51°17′45.5″E

Bakeri Expressway (formerly known as Asia Boulevard) is a north–south highway in the west of Tehran, Iran. It begins from the Hesarak in the north and passes other major highways like Niyayesh, Hemmat and Hakim ending in Tehran–Karaj Expressway. Bakeri is one of the main Expressways of Tehran.

The length of this highway is 7 kilometers.
