= Trolleybus usage by country =

As of 2025 there are around 260 cities or metropolitan areas where trolleybuses are operated, and more than 550 additional trolleybus systems have existed in the past. For complete lists of trolleybus systems by location, with dates of opening and (where applicable) closure, see List of trolleybus systems and the related lists indexed there.

The following are summary notes about current and past trolleybus operation, by country, for every country in which trolleybuses have operated (aside from temporary, experimental operations).

== Africa ==
=== Morocco ===
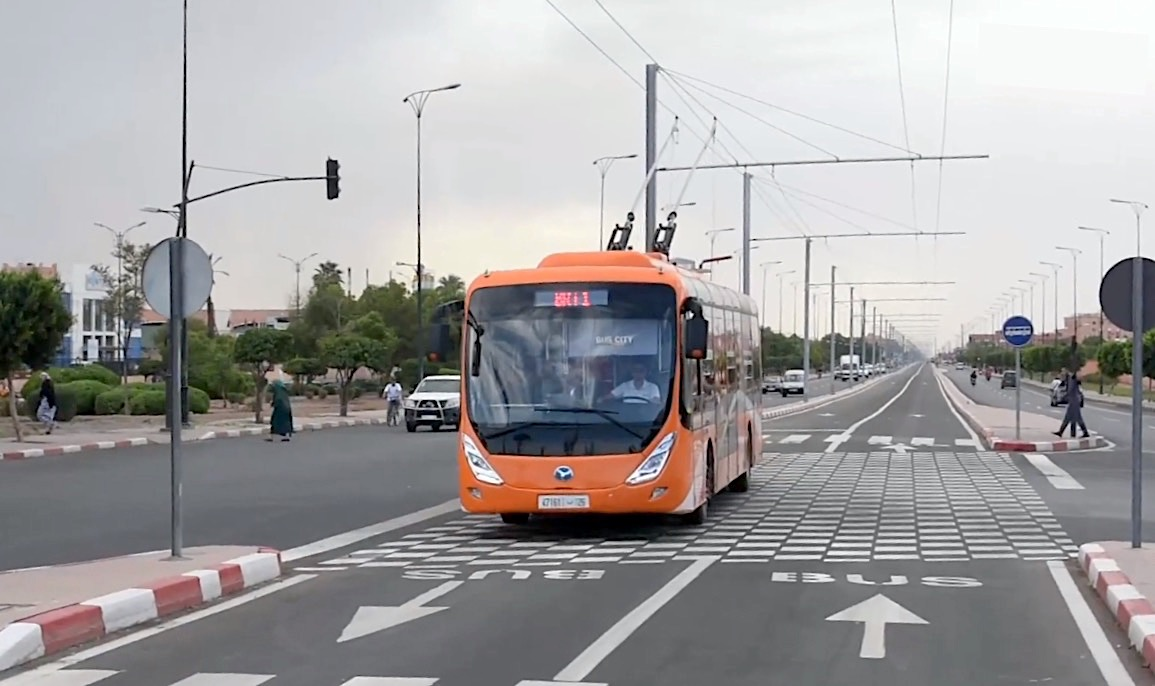
A trolleybus on the new system in Marrakesh, 2017

A new trolleybus system in Marrakesh, Morocco, opened in September 2017. It is the first trolleybus system to operate in any African country since 1986. In the past, trolleybuses provided service in several South African cities, as well as two cities in Algeria, three in Morocco (of which Marrakesh was not one), one in Tunisia and one in Egypt.

=== South Africa ===
Until 2017, the last city on the continent to be served by trolleybuses had been Johannesburg, whose trolleybus system closed in 1986.

== Asia ==
In addition to the countries listed below, the following countries in Asia once possessed trolleybus systems, but in just a single city or metropolitan area each, and all of these had ceased operation by 1999: Ceylon (now Sri Lanka), Malaysia, Myanmar, Philippines, Singapore, and Vietnam.

=== Afghanistan ===
The country had only one trolleybus system, in Kabul. It was constructed from the mid-1970s and opened in 1979, in the Democratic Republic of Afghanistan. Damage received during the civil war caused operation to be suspended indefinitely in 1993, and the system never reopened.

=== China ===
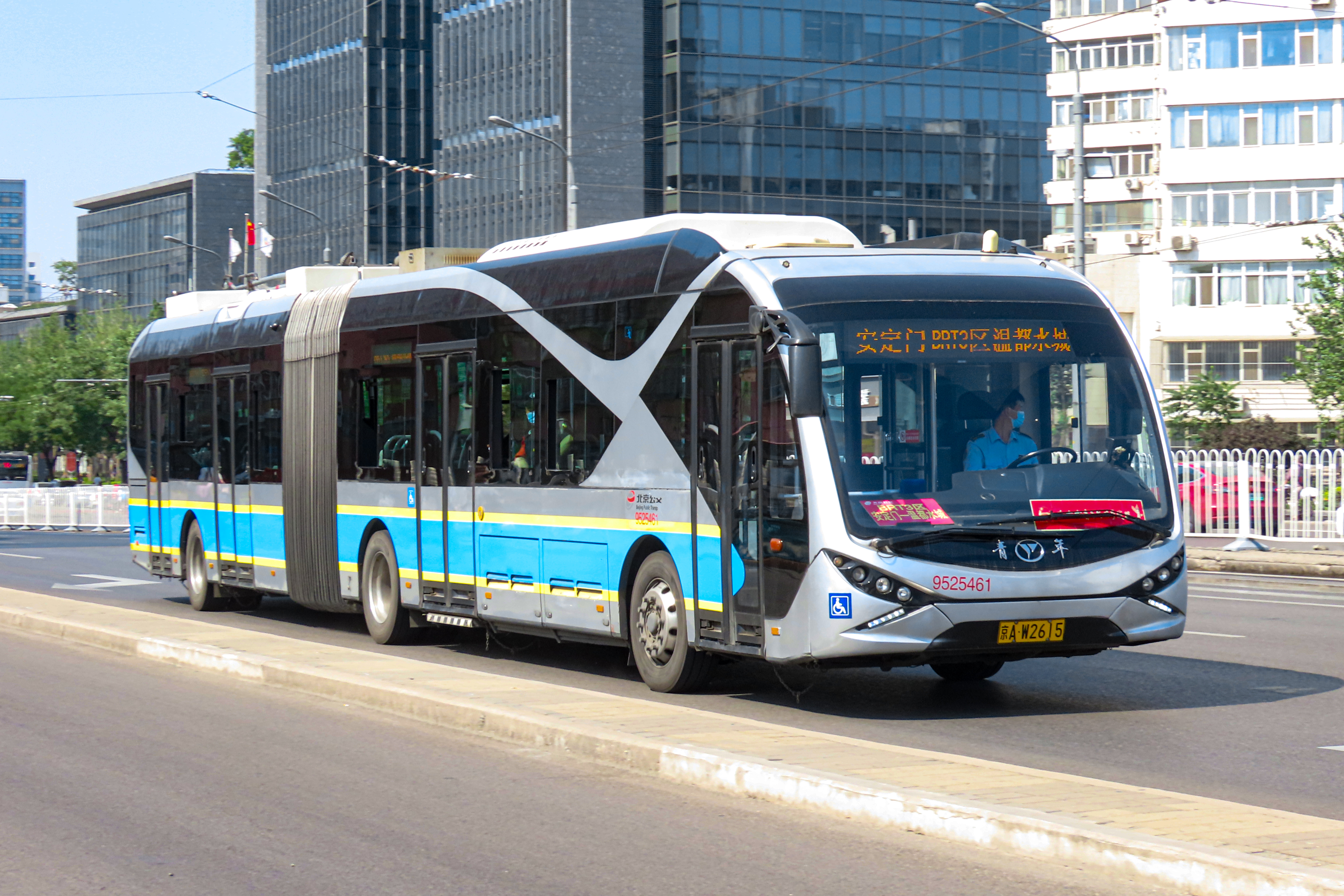
Trolleybus in Beijing

Trolleybuses have provided regular public transport service in 27 different cities in China at one time or another. Currently, 11 urban systems are in operation, and they include Beijing, Shanghai, Guangzhou, Wuhan, Qingdao and Jinan, among other locations. Beijing's trolleybus system, the most extensive in China and one of the largest in the world, has 31 routes and served by a fleet of over 1,250 dual-mode single and articulated trolleybuses. Asia's first eBRT trolleybus system is in Beijing. Shanghai's system is the world's oldest continuously operating trolleybus system, having been in operation since November 1914. China also has a few very small trolleybus systems located away from urban areas, at coal mines, with trolleybuses used for transporting of workers between the mines and the workers' housing areas. One such line is at the Wuyang Coal Mine, located near Changzhi, in Shanxi province, which opened in 1985 and, as of 2010, had a fleet of 10 articulated trolleybuses.

=== India ===
A small trolleybus system operated in Delhi from 1935 until about 1962. The Brihanmumbai Electric Supply and Transport of Mumbai operated trolleybuses from 1962 to 1971.

=== Iran ===
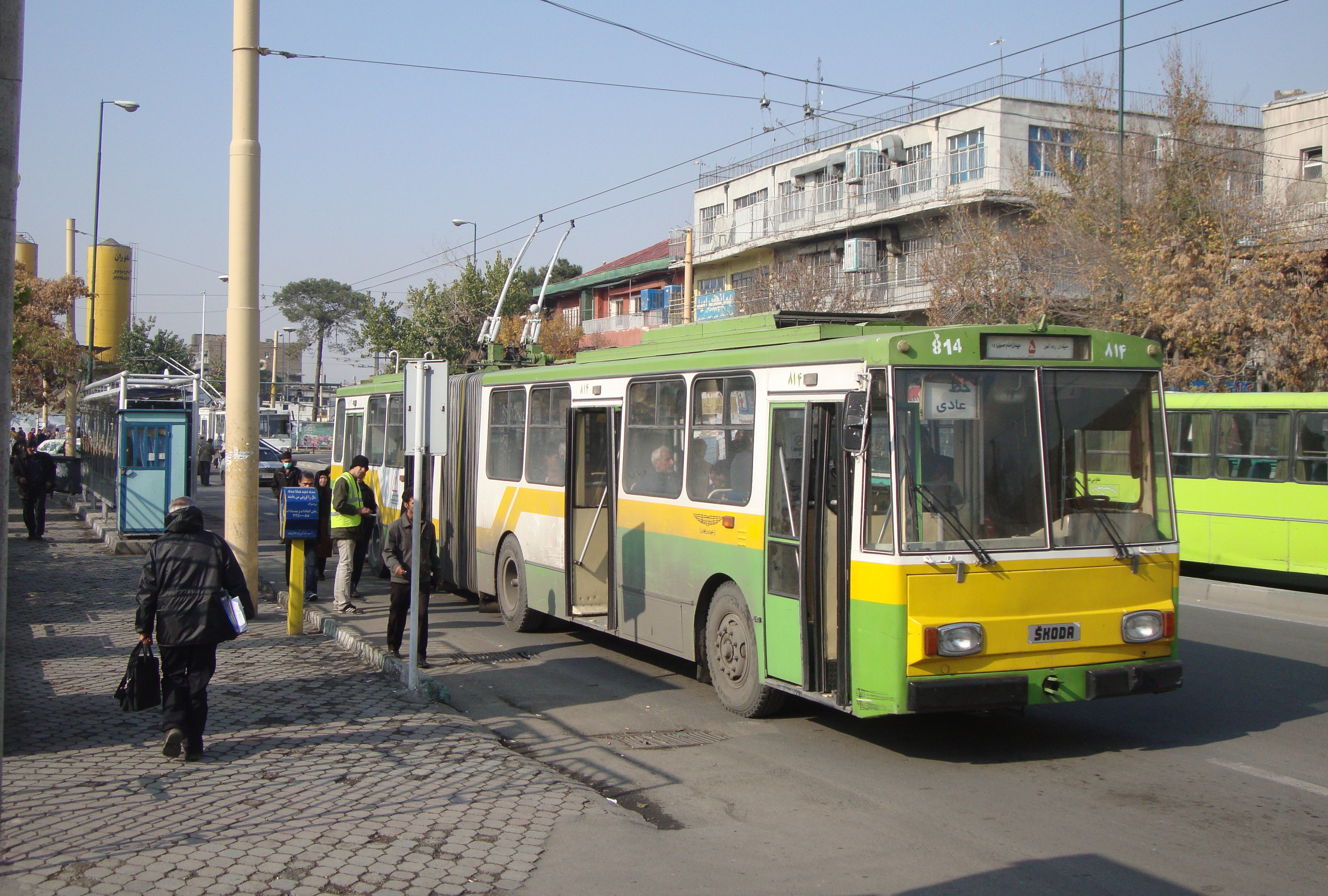
A Tehran trolleybus at Rahahan Square, on a route section opened in 2010

The only trolleybus system to have existed in Iran is located in the capital, Tehran, and opened in 1992. For about 20 years it featured a fleet of 65 articulated vehicles serving routes running mostly in reserved lanes. In 2005, the size of the system was relatively unchanged. Five routes were in operation, of which two were limited-stop services, all starting at Meydan-e-Emam-Hoseyn (Imam Hossein Square), near Imam Hossein station of Tehran Metro Line 2. Two routes ran east from the square and three ran south. The former closed sometime between 2005 and 2010, while the latter remained in operation. A newly built extension to Tehran Railway Station (at Rahahan Square) was opened in 2010, but subsequent pedestrianisation at Meydan-e-Emam-Hoseyn led to the curtailment of all three routes to a point about 1 km south of that busy hub, and all trolleybus service was suspended indefinitely around 2013. However, the system reopened in March 2016, initially limited to a 2-km route between Bozorgrah-e-Be'sat and Meydan-e-Khorasan but extended by 2018 from the latter to Meydan-e-Shohada, making the route length around 4.3 km (2.7 mi). However, in 2025 it was reported that trolleybus operation had ceased again, sometime in the second half of 2024, and that new battery-electric buses had been acquired to replace the trolleybuses.

=== Japan ===
No trolleybus systems remain in operation, the last having closed in 2024. After 1972, when the last urban system closed, the only remaining trolleybus operation was the Kanden Tunnel Trolleybus, an unusual mountain line that opened in 1964, and after 1996 additionally the similar and nearby Tateyama Tunnel Trolleybus line that opened as a trolleybus service that year. Now served by battery-electric buses, both lines are mostly or entirely in tunnel and serve mainly tourists and hikers in a scenic mountainous area. The Kanden Tunnel line was converted from trolleybuses to battery buses between its 2018 and 2019 seasons, while the same conversion took place on the Tateyama Tunnel line between the 2024 and 2025 seasons, with 30 November 2024 being the last day of operation of the last trolleybus line in Japan.

In the 20th century, conventional trolleybus systems operated in seven Japanese cities. Trolleybuses were part of the regular urban transport service in the cities of Kawasaki, Kyoto, Nagoya, Osaka, Tokyo and Yokohama, mainly during the 1950s and 1960s, but lasting from 1932 to 1969 in Kyoto. The last urban system to close was that of Yokohama, in 1972. In Japan, this mode of transport is regarded as a railway, so the requirements of the Act on Rail Tracks/Railway Business Act were applied. The drivers were required to get a licence of railroad engineer as well as a driver's license.

=== Kyrgyzstan ===
Trolleybus systems operate in the capital city, Bishkek (since 1951), as well as in Osh (since 1977) and Naryn (since 1994), as of 1999. All three were still in operation in 2013. Bishkek uses trolleybuses alongside buses and marshrutkas. The Bishkek system was introduced to Kyrgyzstan by the Soviet Union during the city's industrialization period. The city still uses some trolleybuses built during the last years of the Soviet era, but has started to update the fleet with newer models. System in Bishkek closed in 2024 and Naryn finally in 2025, after a period of inactivity. Last trolleybus system in the country remains in Osh, where were transferred several vehicles from closed system in Bishkek.

=== Mongolia ===
The capital city, Ulaanbaatar, has several trolleybus-operating private companies. The trolleybus system was introduced to Mongolia by the Soviet Union during the industrialization period of the city.

=== Nepal ===
Chinese-built trolleybuses operated on a route from Kathmandu to Bhaktapur between 1975 and 2001. A limited trolleybus service was restarted in 2003, and there were plans to expand it, but they did not come to fruition. Trolleybus operation was suspended again in November 2008, and in 2009 that cessation was made permanent.

=== North Korea ===
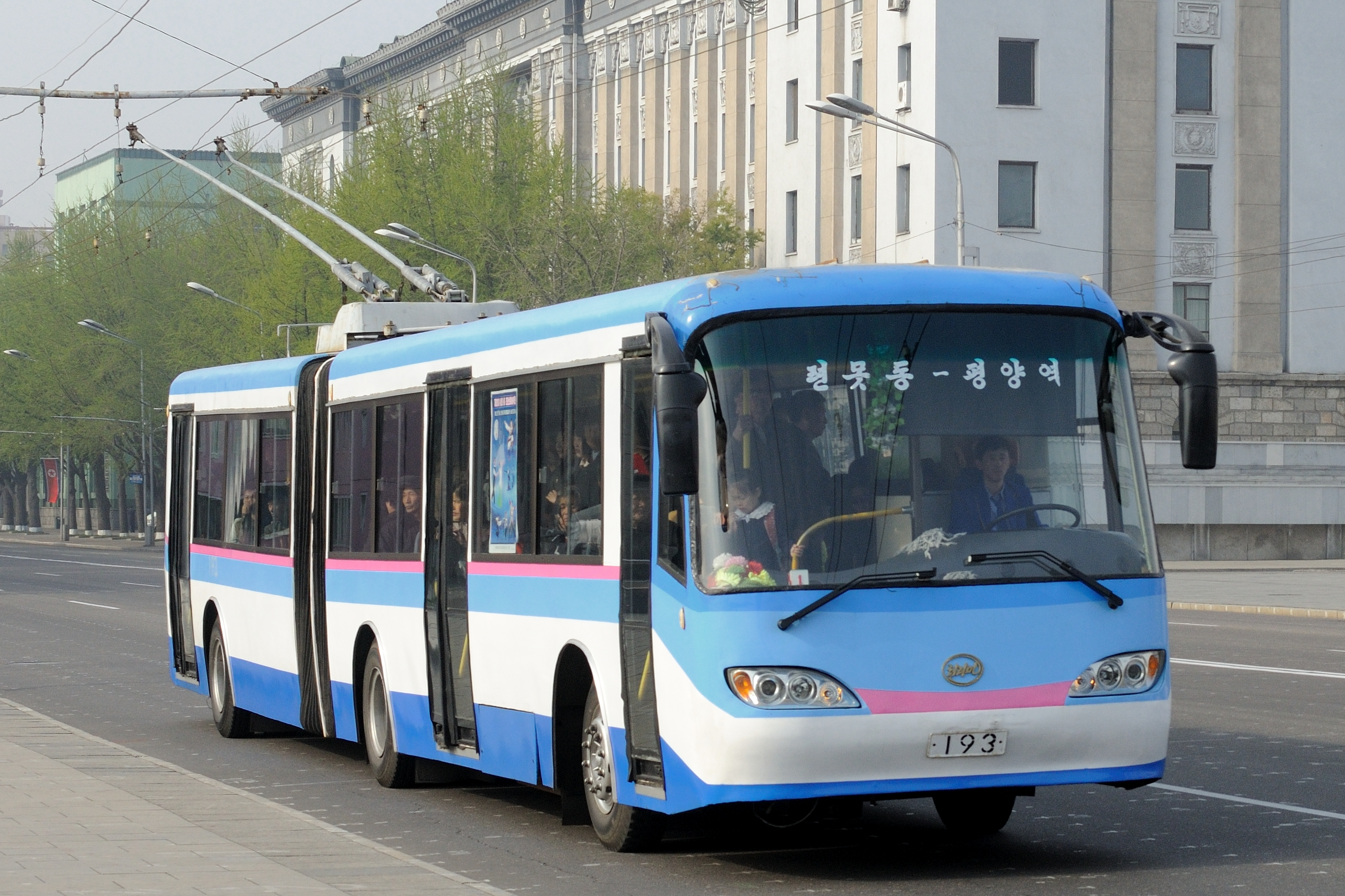
A type Chollima 091 trolleybus in Pyongyang in 2014

Trolleybuses have operated in Pyongyang since 1962, with a large fleet serving several routes. Due to the closed nature of North Korea, the existence of trolleybus networks in other North Korean cities was generally unknown outside the country for many years, but it is now known that around 12 to 15 other cities also possess trolleybus systems, among them Chongjin and Nampho. A few other places have private, very small (in some cases only one or two vehicles) systems for transporting workers from a housing area to a nearby coal mine or other industrial site—or at least did at some time within recent years. Trolleybuses include both imported and locally made vehicles. Imported buses are from Europe and copied versions from China. There are a few local manufacturers of trolleybuses. More recently, while the systems in larger cities are refreshed, some smaller networks, such as Tanchon (2011), Hochon County (2020), Onsong County (before 2004), Kapsan County (unknown), Sinpyong County (2015), Sudong (unknown) and Yonsan County (unknown) have had their trolleybuses removed, though at least in Onsong, the wires have been preserved in relatively good condition.

=== Saudi Arabia ===
The first and only trolleybus system to exist in Saudi Arabia opened in April 2013 in Riyadh, serving the then-new main campus of the King Saud bin Abdulaziz University for Health Sciences. The service is provided with a fleet of 12 articulated trolleybuses built in Germany by Viseon Bus.

=== Tajikistan ===
Two trolleybus networks have operated in this country, both having been built during the Soviet period, the Dushanbe system in 1955 and the Khujand (Khodzhent) one in 1970. The Dushanbe system is still in operation as of 2026, whilst the Khujand system was closed in September 2010 (discontinuation officially announced in April 2013). Most of trolleybus routes of Dushanbe based on IMC technology. Mostly rolling stock consists of Belorussian BKM-32100D "Syabar".

=== Turkey ===
Trolleybuses operate in Malatya (a new system opened in 2015) and Sanliurfa (opened in 2023), and in the past, the Asian part of Turkey included trolleybus systems in Ankara and Izmir. See Turkey listing in Eurasia section, below, for details.

=== Turkmenistan ===
The capital city of Ashgabat is the only city where trolleybuses have operated. The system opened in 1964 and closed at the end of 2011.

=== Uzbekistan ===
Nine cities in this former Soviet republic have had trolleybus systems. All nine were still in operation in 1999, but by 2010 all except the Urgench system, which is an interurban line between Urgench and Khiva, had closed.

== Eurasia ==
This section is for countries located partly in Asia and partly in Europe. See the "Asia" and "Europe" sections for countries not included here.

=== Armenia ===
Six trolleybus routes run in Yerevan, Armenia. The trolleybus system has been in operation since 1949.

=== Azerbaijan ===
Trolleybus systems have existed in five cities: Baku, Ganja, Mingachevir, Nakhchivan and Sumqayit (Sumgait). Of these, the Baku system was the earliest, opened in 1941, and the largest, with 360 vehicles at its maximum and 30 routes. All five systems survived into the 2000s, but they all closed during that decade, the last to close being the Baku and Mingachevir systems, in 2006.

=== Georgia ===
Trolleybuses remain in operation only in Sukhumi, but trolleybuses once operated in 11 other Georgian cities (see List of trolleybus systems). All 12 systems were opened during the Soviet era, when Georgia was part of the Soviet Union. The Tbilisi system opened in 1937, while the opening dates for the others ranged from 1967 to 1986. The Gori system, which ceased operation in March 2010, was the most recent closure.

=== Soviet Union ===
Trolleybuses have operated in all 15 of the now-independent republics that once made up the Soviet Union, with by far the largest number of systems being in Russia and Ukraine. For information on specific countries, see their separate entries in this article.

=== Turkey ===
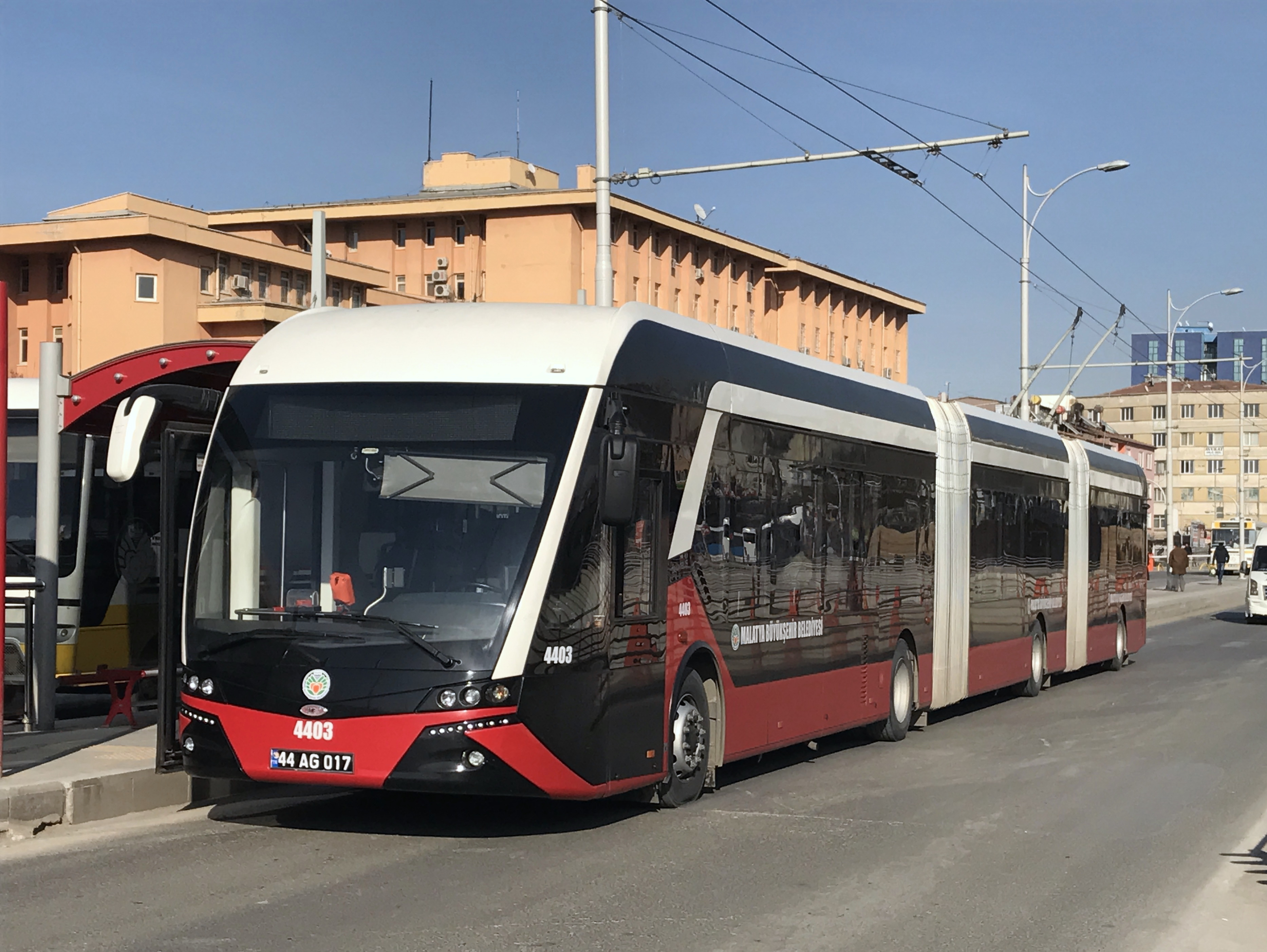
The trolleybus system of Malatya opened in 2015 and uses vehicles that were mostly Turkish-built.

Trolleybuses have operated in both the Asian and European parts of Turkey, in five cities: Ankara, Istanbul, Izmir, Malatya, and Sanliurfa. The last two of these are new systems opened in 2015 and 2023, respectively, while the other three systems had all closed by the early 1990s. Turkey's first trolleybus line began operating in 1947 in the capital, Ankara. On 1 June 1947, 10 Brill trolleybuses, joined in 1948 by 10 FBW vehicles, started running between the Ulus and Bakanliklar districts. In 1952, 13 more trolleybuses were bought from MAN. The system closed in 1986. In the financial and cultural capital, Istanbul, the first trolleybuses were introduced in the early 1960s. The first line was the Topkapi-Eminönü line and was constructed by the Italian Ansaldo San Giorgia company. The total length of trolleybus line was 45 km, and there were 100 buses in operation at the system's peak. However, due to frequent power losses it was decided to close the system, and the last trolleybus ran in 1984. The Izmir system closed in 1992, leaving the country with no trolleybus systems for the next two decades.

The new system in Malatya opened in March 2015 and serves a single route that is around 21.5 km (13.4 mi) in length and connects Maşti Otogar (the city's bus station) with İnönü University (İnönü Üniversitesi), using bi-articulated trolleybuses. Another new system opened in April 2023 in Sanliurfa, using the first six of 10 articulated trolleybuses on order from manufacturer Bozankaya, on a 7 km (4.3 mi) route.

== Europe ==
=== Austria ===
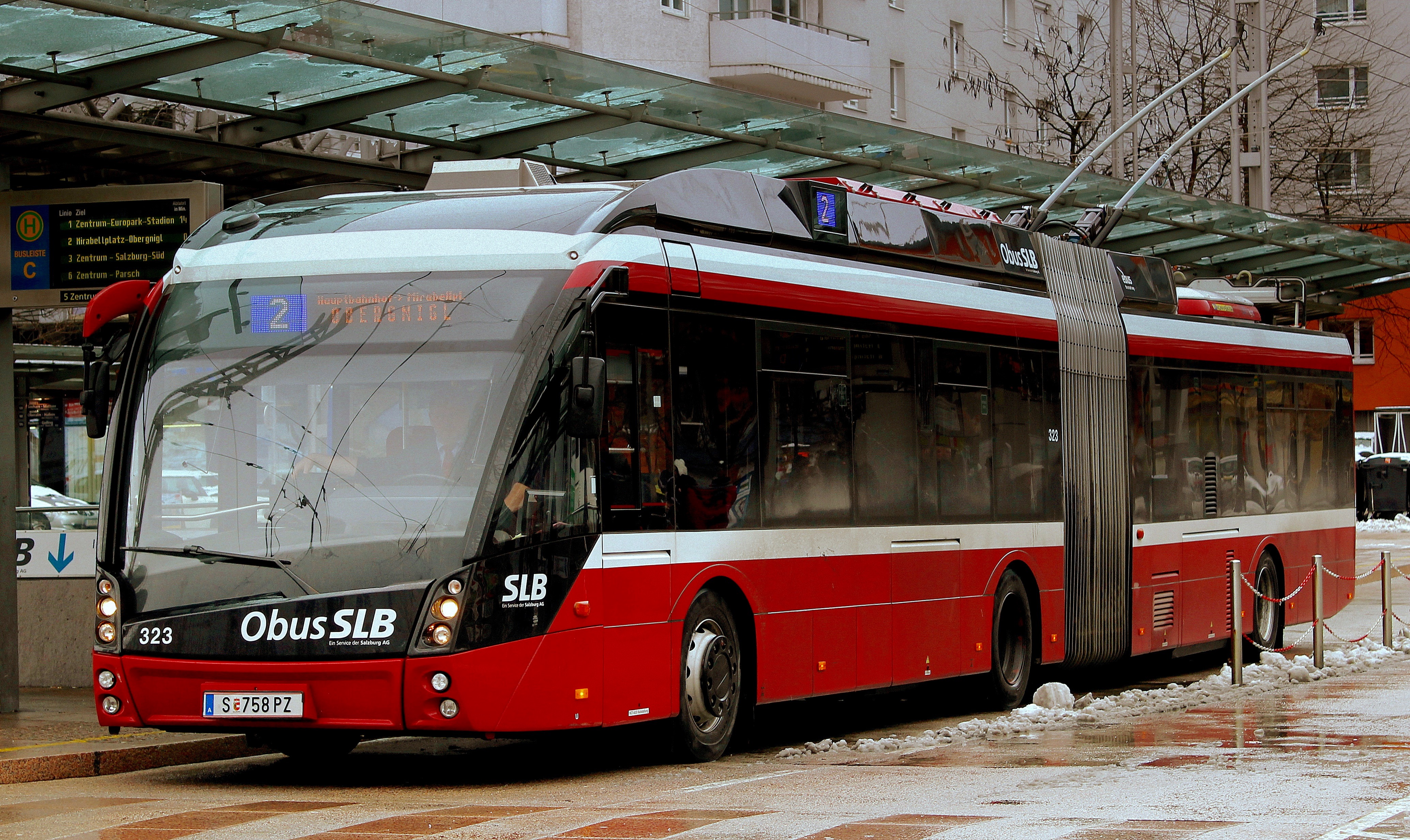
Solaris Trollino 18 MetroStyle in Salzburg

The largest trolleybus system in Austria is in Salzburg, with nine routes and 80 trolleybuses, operating from 06:00 to midnight. The system was introduced in 1940 and has been expanded during recent years. The Linz trolleybus system has four routes and 19 vehicles; after years of uncertainty, the continued existence of the system is guaranteed by the operator. Innsbruck was served by trolleybuses during two past periods, but the second Innsbruck trolleybus system closed in 2007 because of a planned expansion of that city's tram system. However, in 2026 it was decided to bring trolleybus service back to Innsbruck, and a new system is projected to open in 2029. A trolleybus system with two routes existed in Kapfenberg until 2002. The towns of Klagenfurt and Graz closed their trolleybus systems in the 1960s.

=== Belarus ===
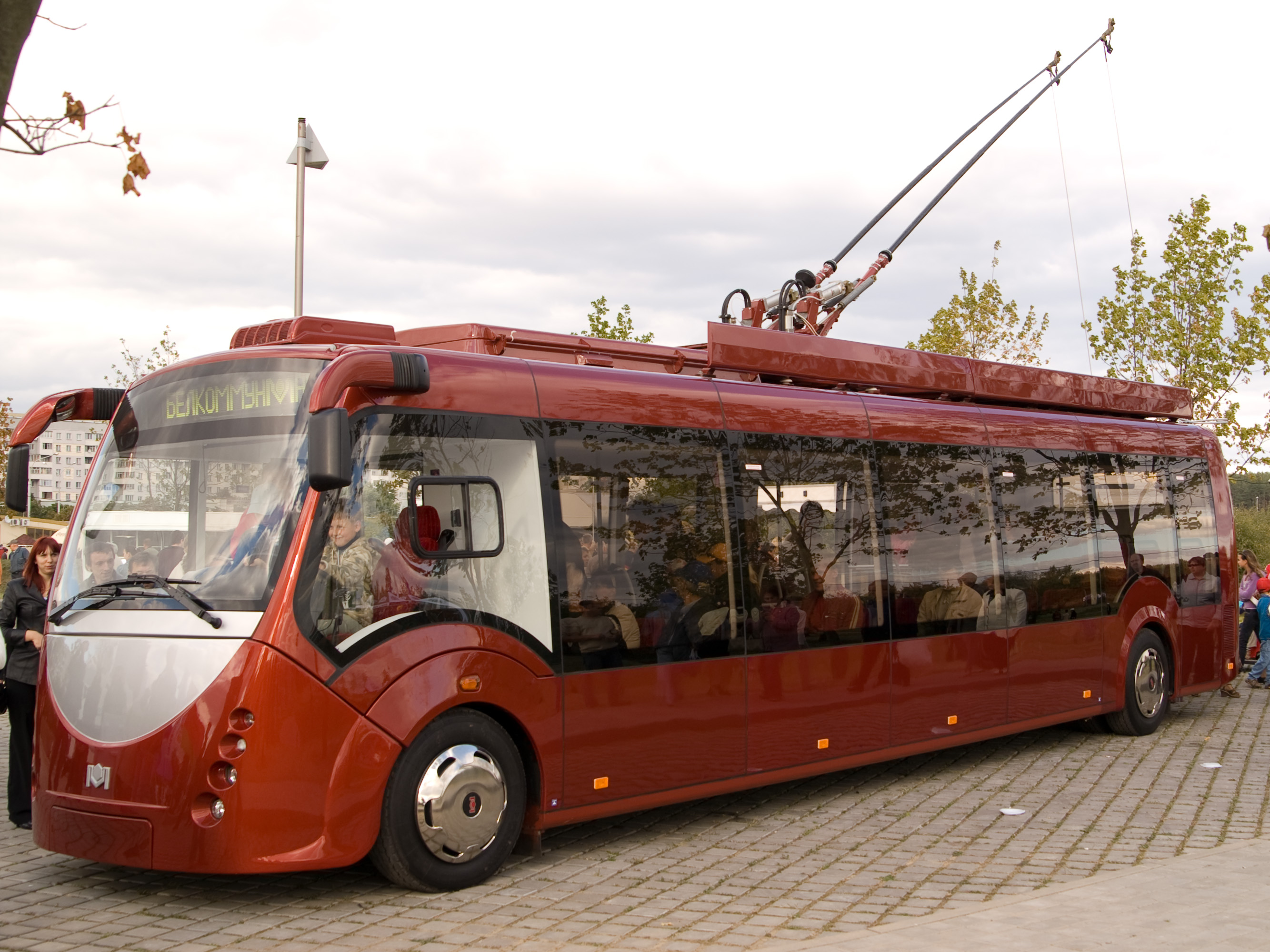
Belkommunmash AKSM-420 in Minsk, Belarus, in 2007

The trolleybus system in Minsk (since 1952) is the largest in the world. Trolleybuses also work in Brest, Vitebsk, Gomel, Grodno, Mogilev and Babruysk (since 1978).

=== Belgium ===
No trolleybus systems remain in operation in Belgium, but in the past, trolleybuses provided a portion of the local transport service in Antwerp, Brussels, Liège and Ghent. The last system, that of Ghent, which ceased operation in June 2009, had opened much later than all of the other Belgian trolleybus systems, in 1989. Government funds to build the Ghent system were provided, in part, for the purpose of improving the prospects for the export of Belgian-built trolleybuses, and the Ghent system's fleet was made up entirely of trolleybuses built by Van Hool, a Belgian company. The Brussels system comprised only a single route (the 54), in contrast to that city's large tram system. Liège had two independent trolleybus systems. One of them, a small system connecting Liège to the suburb of Seraing, operated the world's only double-ended (bi-directional) trolleybuses; the vehicles were eventually rebuilt to conventional (single-ended) configuration. One of those unique vehicles, restored to double-ended configuration, is preserved at the Musée des Transports en commun du Pays de Liège. Trolleybuses from the other Liège system and from Brussels and Ghent are preserved at various museums, including 1932-built Liège 425 at the Sandtoft museum, in England.

=== Bosnia and Herzegovina ===
Trolleybuses are in use only in the capital city, Sarajevo. Operation and maintenance is done by GRAS (City transportation). There are seven routes. Some past routes were destroyed in the Bosnian War.

=== Bulgaria ===
Trolleybus networks operate in Sofia (since 1941), Pleven (1985), Varna (1986), Sliven (1986), Stara Zagora (1987), Ruse (1988), Vratsa (1988), Burgas (1989), Haskovo (1990) and Pazardzhik (1993). The most developed system in terms of route density is in Pleven with 14 trolleybus routes totaling 75 kilometres (47 mi) and serving entirely Pleven's inner city public transport. The largest system is in Sofia: 105 kilometres (65 mi). In the late 1980s the towns of Dimitrovgrad and Gorna Oryahovitsa started to build networks, but due to financial problems the projects were suspended. A few other cities like Shumen, Blagoevgrad, Vidin and Yambol have partially completed their systems however they were never operational. Kazanlak's system, which opened in 1986 was the first to close in 1999. Trolleybuses in Veliko Tarnovo operated from 1991 until 2009 when due to road construction works part of the overhead wires were temporarily removed, but subsequently never restored causing the system to shut down. In Plovdiv the trolleybus system, which opened in 1956 was shut down in 2012 after the contract with the private company who was in charge to operate the trolleybus network was cancelled due to inability to provide adequate coverage for all lines. The trolleybus system of Gabrovo, inaugurated in 1987, was shut down in 2013 due to road construction works and did not reopen. The trolleybus system of Dobrich, which had been operational since 1987, was closed in 2014 for financial reasons. In Pernik the trolleybus system operated from 1987 until 2015 when it was closed down after the municipal transport operator went bankrupt.

=== Croatia ===
No trolleybuses have operated in Croatia since 1972, but two cities once were served by the mode: Rijeka and Split.

=== Czech Republic ===
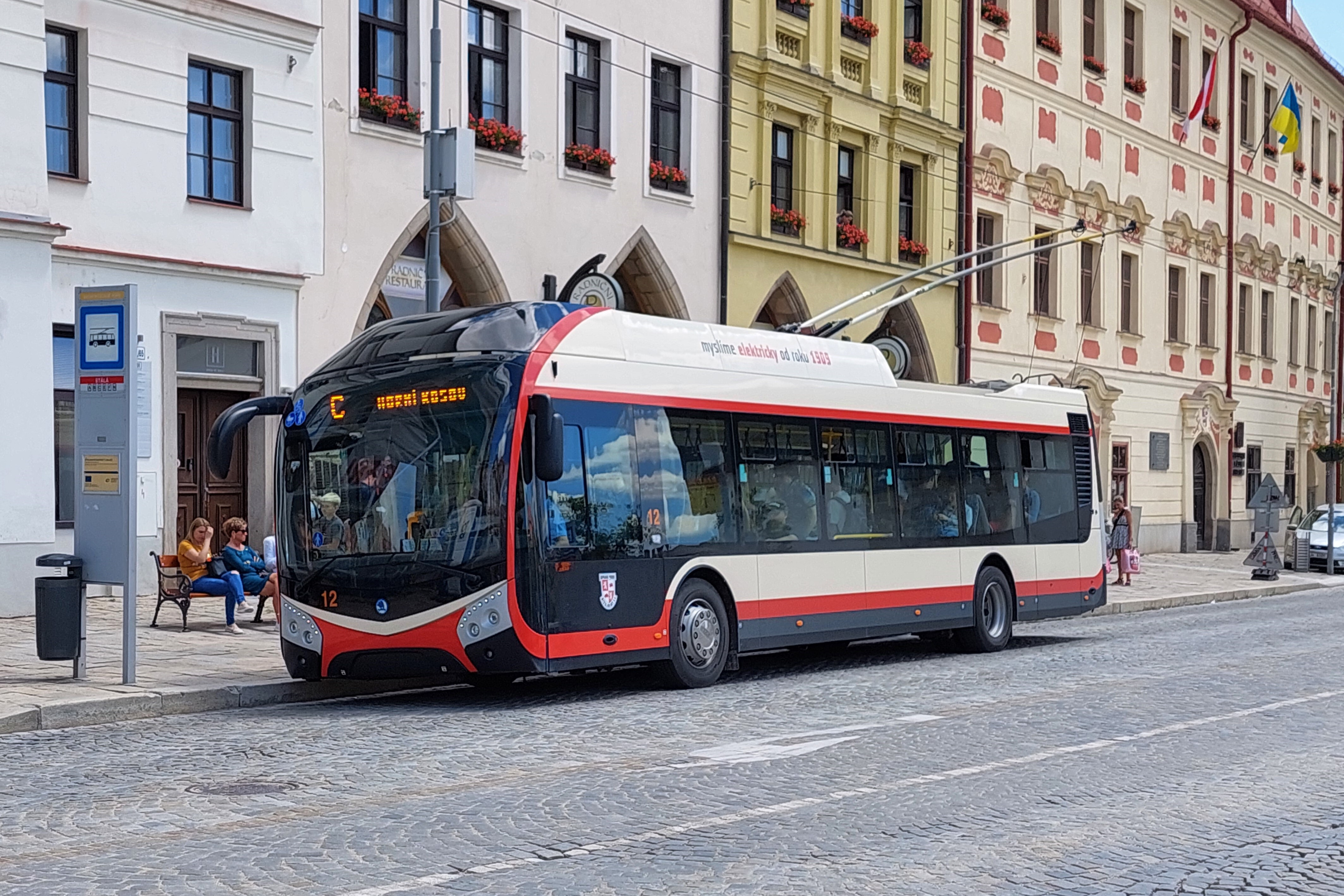
Škoda 32Tr SOR in Jihlava

The Czech Republic has 14 trolleybus systems, in towns both large and small, and in the past trolleybuses also operated in three other cities. See List of trolleybus systems for details.

There also was a line between Ostrov and Jáchymov, taking advantage of steep gradients between these towns, used only for testing trolleybuses made at the Škoda factory in Ostrov. The line was dismantled in 2006, following the cessation of production in Škoda Ostrov in 2004. Škoda Ostrov was then moved to Plzeň building new spare parts for already operational trolleybuses. But this did not last long and Škoda Ostrov definitely closed in 2008. New Škoda brand trolleybuses are being built in Plzeň from 2004 under the Škoda Electric factory.

=== Denmark ===
Trolleybuses were introduced in Gentofte (a suburb of Copenhagen) with one line in 1927 – operated by the regional power company, NESA. The network was gradually expanded to connect to the suburbs of Lyngby and Søborg also. From 1938 to 1963 trolleybuses were operating on the route on Lyngbyvej to Nørreport Station (in downtown Copenhagen). From 1953 onward NESA operated 4 trolleybus lines. In 1963 the two lines to Nørreport Station were converted to operate with diesel buses. NESA replaced the last trolleybus with diesel buses in 1971.

The city of Odense also got a trolleybus line in 1939. In 1959 this line was converted to operate with diesel buses.

=== Estonia ===
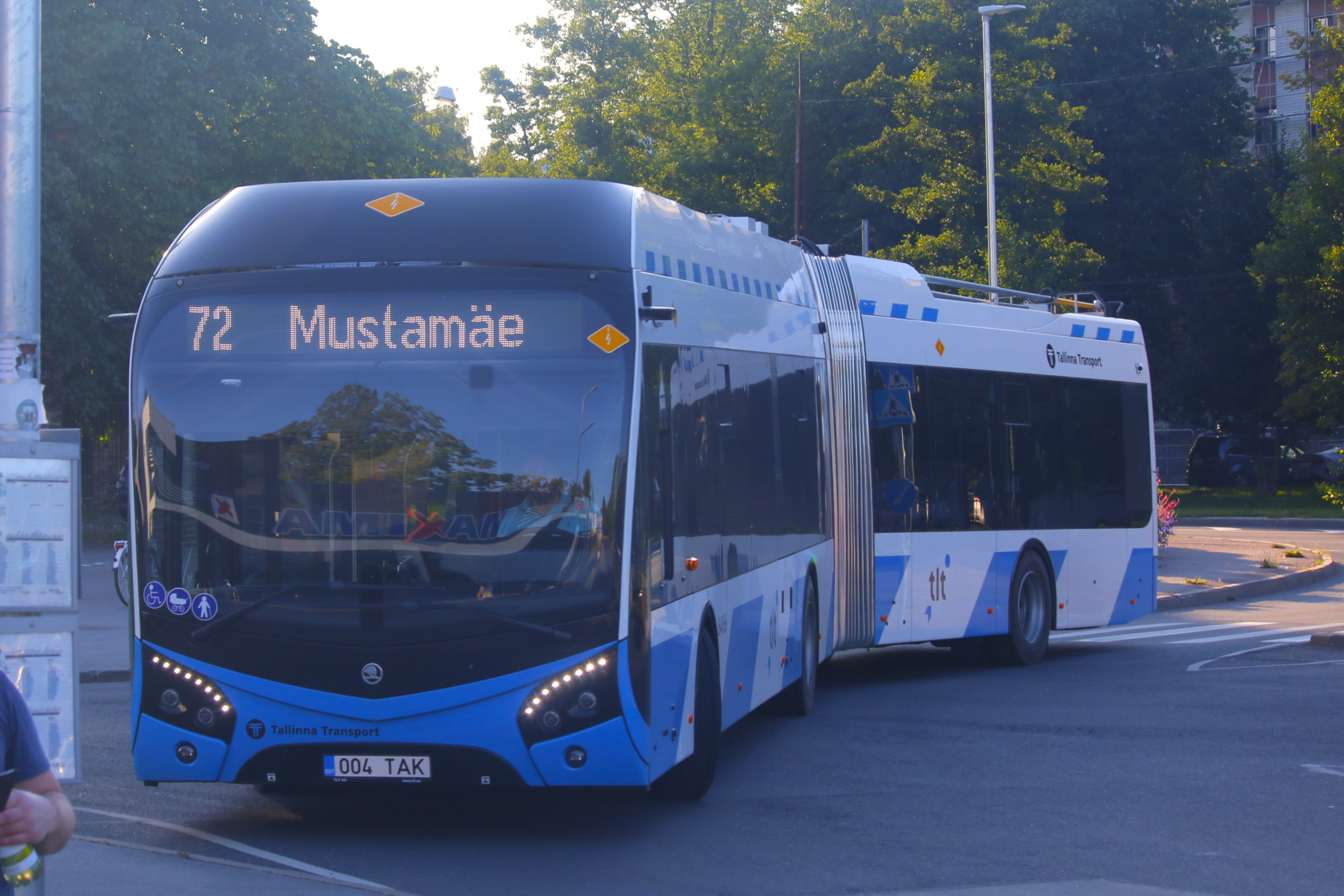
Škoda 33Tr SOR in Tallinn

Trolleybuses are in use in Tallinn. The first trolleybus route opened on 6 July 1965. At its peak, the system had nine routes, currently the city of Tallinn is gradually substituting trolleybuses with hybrid drive buses. By 3 May 2017 only four lines remain in service, the overhead wires have been dismantled on lines that have been closed. Some old Skoda 14Tr and 15Tr trolleybuses have been replaced with newer low-floor Solaris/Ganz T12 and T18 articulated models. In 2025 Municipality of Tallinn had ordered 40 new trolleybuses Škoda that should be delivered in 2026.

=== Finland ===
Tampere and Helsinki have had trolleybus systems in the past. In Tampere, trolleybus operations began in 1948 and ended in 1976. At the system's maximum extent seven trolleybus lines operated. Two trolleybuses have been preserved, in the collection of Tampereen kaupungin liikennelaitos. In Helsinki a single trolleybus line was operated, 1949–1974. An attempt to restore trolleybus operation in Helsinki was made in the late 1970s and resulted in the acquisition of a prototype trolleybus which was used between 1979 and 1985. Three Helsinki trolleybuses have been preserved. Of these, number 605 is on display at the Helsinki Tram Museum. Helsinki is considering restoring trolleybus services.

=== France ===
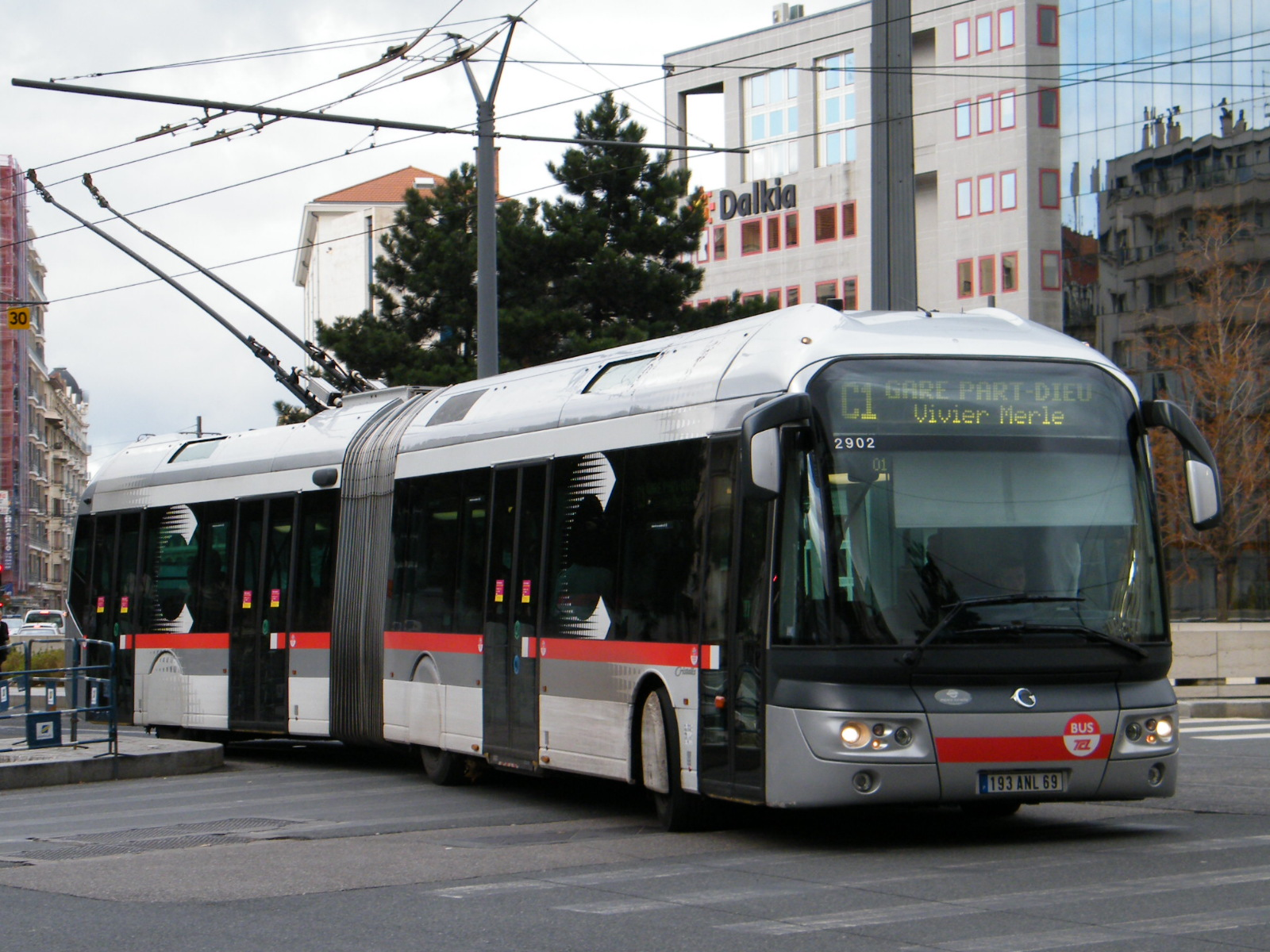
Irisbus Cristalis articulated trolleybus in Lyon, France

Trolleybuses are used in Limoges, Lyon, Nancy and Saint-Étienne, which have expanded their use. Preserved trolleybuses are at the Musée des Transports (AMTUIR) in Colombes.

=== Germany ===
Trolleybuses operate in Eberswalde (near Berlin), Esslingen (near Stuttgart) and Solingen (near Düsseldorf). There were over 60 trolleybus systems in the late 1950s, many having replaced under-used tram services.

=== Greece ===
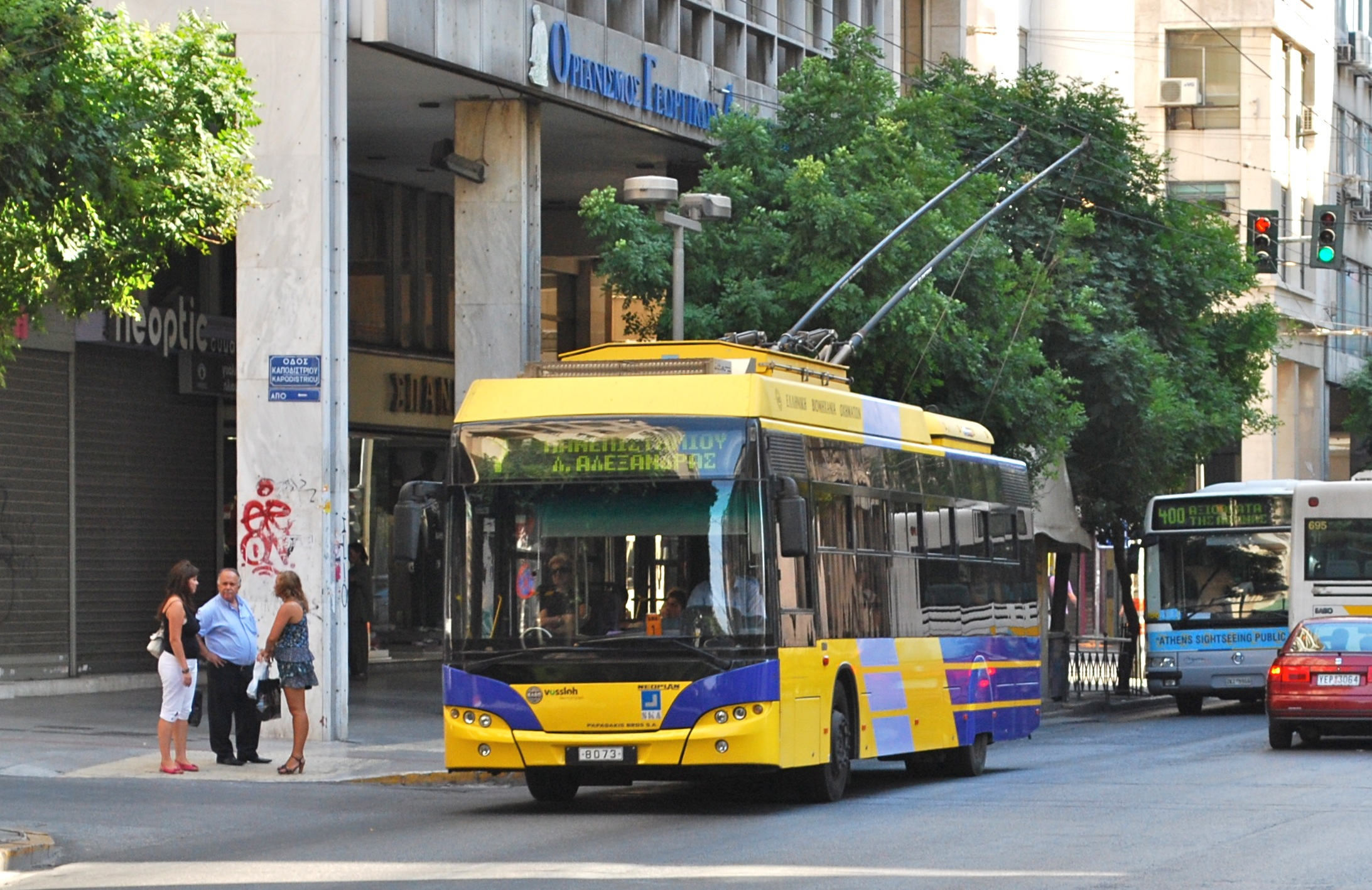
A trolleybus in Athens in 2009

Twenty trolleybus lines serve Athens, especially the municipalities of Athens, Piraeus, Kallithea, Chalandri and also other municipalities. The trolleybus network, is one of the largest in Europe, with 354 trolleybuses. It was formerly operated by IEM, later by ILPAP and now OSY S.A., subsidiary of OASA S.A. (Athens Urban Transport Organisation). The entire fleet was replaced with new Neoplan and Van Hool low-floor trolleybuses from 1999 to 2004.

=== Hungary ===
Trolleybuses are used in Budapest, Szeged and Debrecen. In Budapest the fleet is operated by Budapesti Közlekedési Vállalat Zrt.

=== Italy ===
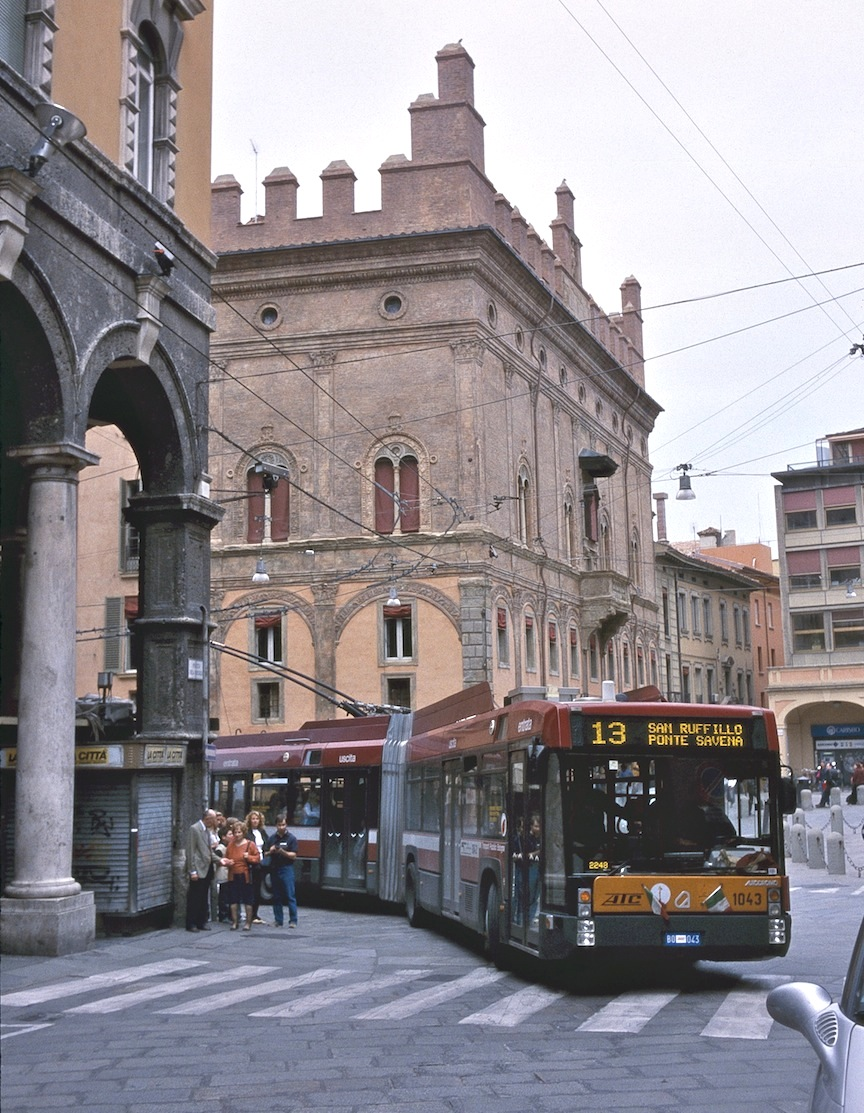
A trolleybus in Bologna, Italy

Trolleybuses are in use in Ancona, Bologna, Cagliari, Chieti, Genoa, La Spezia, Lecce, Milan, Modena, Naples, Parma, Pescara, Rimini, and Rome. The oldest existing system is the Milan system, which opened in October 1933 and is now the fifth-oldest trolleybus system in the world (and the second-oldest in Europe, after that of Lausanne). The largest systems are that of Milan (about 170 vehicles, serving four routes) and Bologna (95 vehicles, five routes). The system in Lecce is relatively young, having opened in January 2012. Even more recently, a new system in Avellino opened in 2023, and one in Pescara in 2025, and another new system is under construction in Verona.

Historically, Italy has had a large number of trolleybus systems, with 64 having been opened in the 20th century, 41 of which were still in operation in 1960. And, although the majority of systems existing in 1960 have since closed, four more new systems opened in the 21st century, including a second Rome system (in 2005) and the three mentioned above, in Lecce, Avellino, and Pescara.

=== Latvia ===
Trolleybuses have been used in Riga since 1947. Currently there are 264 trolleybuses operated on 19 routes by Rīgas Satiksme.

=== Lithuania ===
Trolleybuses have been used in Vilnius since 1956 (18 routes) and Kaunas (14 routes) since 1965.

=== Moldova ===
Trolleybuses are used in Chișinău (1949), currently 340 trolleybuses serving 30 routes, Bălți (1972), Tighina (1993) and Tiraspol (1967). Trolleybuses, along with rutierele, are the most used mode of public transport in Chișinău.

=== Netherlands ===
Trolleybuses have been in use in Arnhem since 1949. Past trolleybus systems were located in Groningen (1927–65) and Nijmegen (1952–69).

=== Norway ===
In Bergen, Norway, trolleybuses have been in use since 1950.

In 1909, Drammen had the first trolleybus system in Scandinavia, running until 1967, and trolleybuses also served Oslo and Stavanger from the 1940s until the 1960s.

=== Poland ===
Ursus T701.16 in Lublin

The first trolleybus network in Poland opened in Poznań in 1930. There were 7 municipals systems operational after World War Two, partially inherited after the Germans; the trolleybus transportation reached its climax in the early 1960s, with some 130 vehicles in Warsaw alone. Most systems were closed in the 1970s. Currently there are 3 networks in service, in Gdynia, Lublin and Tychy. The total number of vehicles operational is about 260.

=== Portugal ===
Trolleybuses are currently operated only in Coimbra, where the system is managed by a municipal authority, SMTUC. Two other cities used trolleybuses in the past: Braga was served by trolleybuses from 1963 to 1979. In Porto, Sociedade de Transportes Colectivos do Porto operated several trolleybus routes from 1959 to 1997 and has preserved some of its historic vehicles. Unusually, the Porto fleet included double-deck trolleybuses.

=== Romania ===
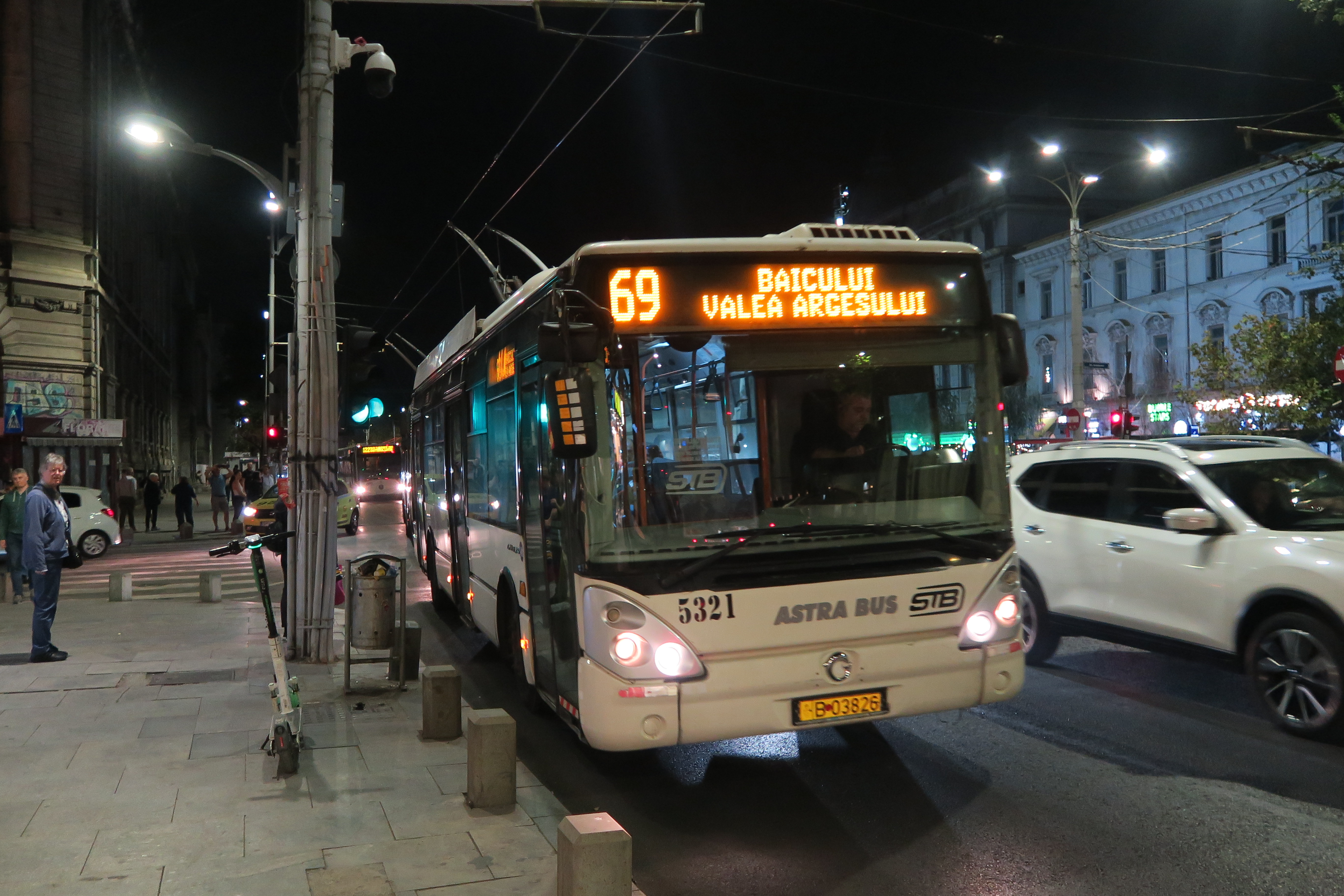
An Astra Irisbus trolleybus in Bucharest

In addition to Cernăuți (1939) and Timișoara (1942), where the first trolleybus systems in Romania opened, and Bucharest (1949), where around 300 vehicles served 19 routes as of early 2009, the larger trolleybus systems opened in 1959 under Soviet influence: Brașov (shrunk considerably in the 2000s), Cluj (1959), Constanta (1959; shrunk considerably in the 2000s; closed 2010). Timișoara's system (1942) was built with Italian equipment and vehicles. Most smaller systems were opened through a government program in the 1980s and 1990s, although only about half survive: Sibiu (1983; closed 2009), Iași (1985; closed 2006), Suceava (1987; closed 2006), Brăila (1989; closed 1999), Galați (1989), Mediaș (1989), Satu Mare (1994; closed 2005), Vaslui (1994; suspended in 2009 for modernization; reopened in August 2023), Piatra Neamț (1995; closed 2019), Târgu Jiu (1995), Târgoviște (1995; closed 2005), Baia Mare (1996), Slatina (1996; closed 2006), Ploiești (1997).

=== Russia ===
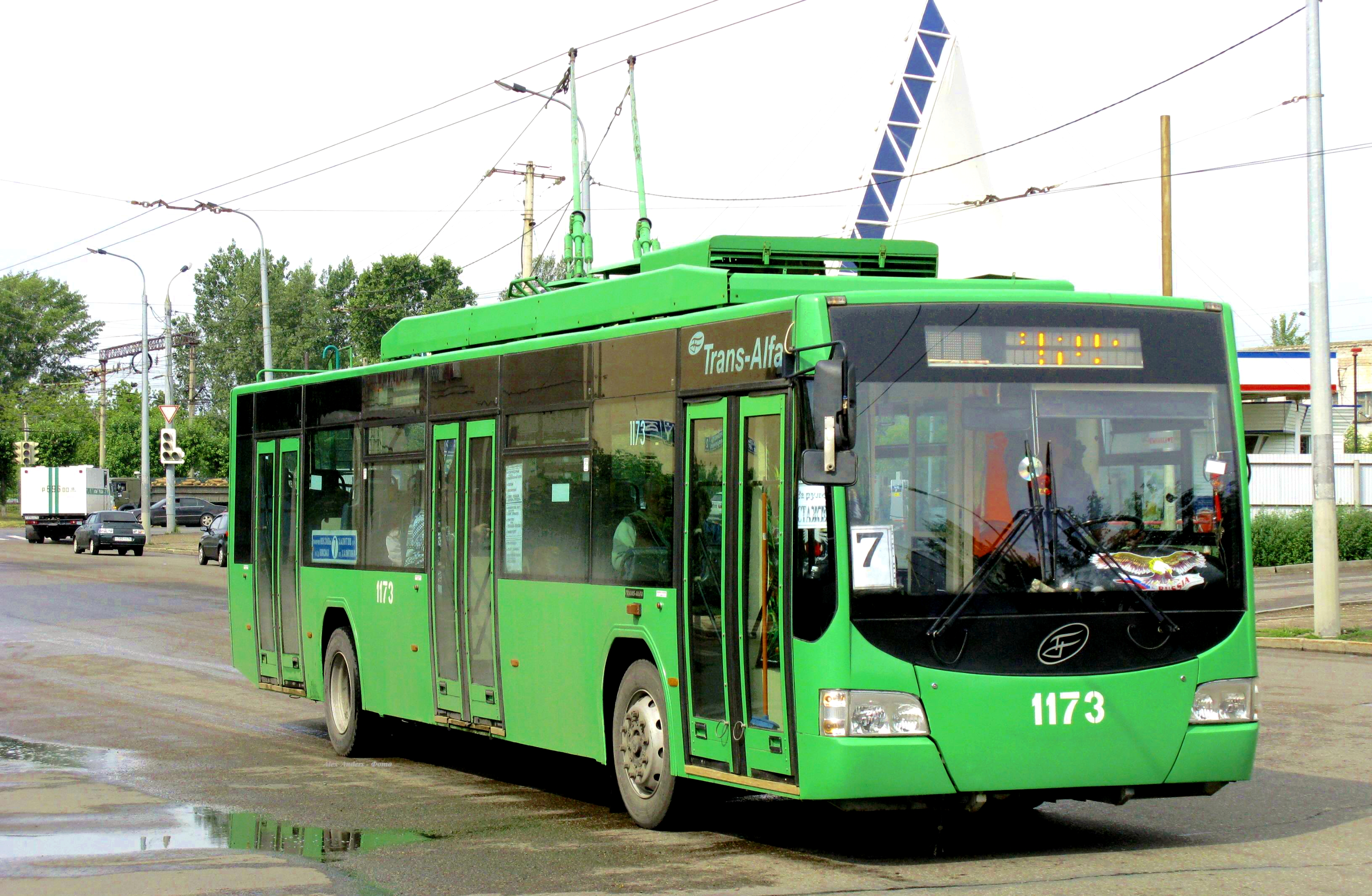
Trolleybus in Kazan

Trolleybus systems operate in 85 cities. In Saint Petersburg and Nizhny Novgorod museum trolleybuses may be hired for city excursions and parties.

=== Serbia ===
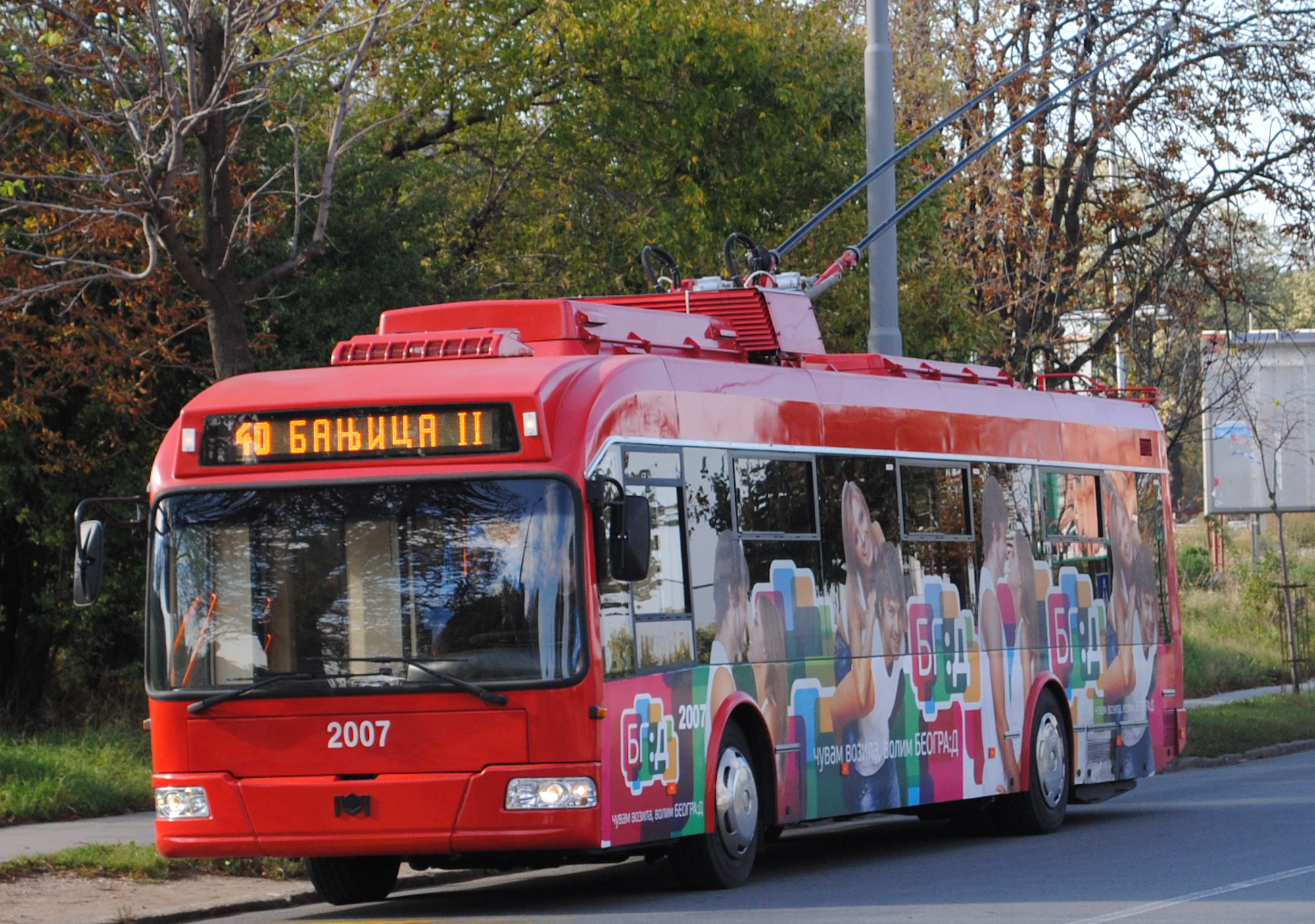
A Belkommunmash AKSM-32100S trolleybus in Belgrade

There are seven trolleybus routes in Belgrade, although one is currently substituted by a bus route due to lack of vehicles. Four of them are variations of the original line established shortly after World War II to replace the original tram line traversing the city centre, however only one passes through the centre today. Another two are independent lines, though starting from the same central terminal, while the last connects the two's peripheral ends. A potential shutdown of the system has been discussed since 2024.

=== Slovakia ===
The first trolleybus system connected Poprad with Starý Smokovec from 1904 to 1906. The second trolleybus system was built in 1909 in Bratislava, but served only until 1915. The route led to the hilly recreational area of Železná studienka and the trolleybuses' motors were fed by a four-wheel bogie running on top of the wires and connected to the vehicle by a cable. Trolleybuses in Bratislava were reintroduced in 1941, with standard trolley poles. In 1962 trolleybuses were introduced in Prešov. Banská Bystrica introduced trolleybuses in 1989, Košice in 1993 and Žilina in 1994. All trolleybuses were made by Škoda. As of 2021, trolleybuses operate in Banská Bystrica, Bratislava, Prešov and Žilina. Since 2015, trolleybuses no longer operate in Košice.

=== Slovenia ===
The first trolleybus line in the Balkans opened to the public on 24 October 1909 in the coastal town of Piran, then part of Austria-Hungary. It ran from the Tartini Square, the central square of the town, along the coast and the shipyard to Portorož and Lucija. The town authorities bought five trolleybuses manufactured by the Austrian company Daimler-Motoren-Gesellschaft. In August 1912, it was replaced by the town's tram system on the same route. From 1951 until 1971, trolleybuses served Ljubljana, the capital of the then Socialist Republic of Slovenia, until 1958 alongside the tram. There were five trolleybus lines in Ljubljana.

=== Spain ===
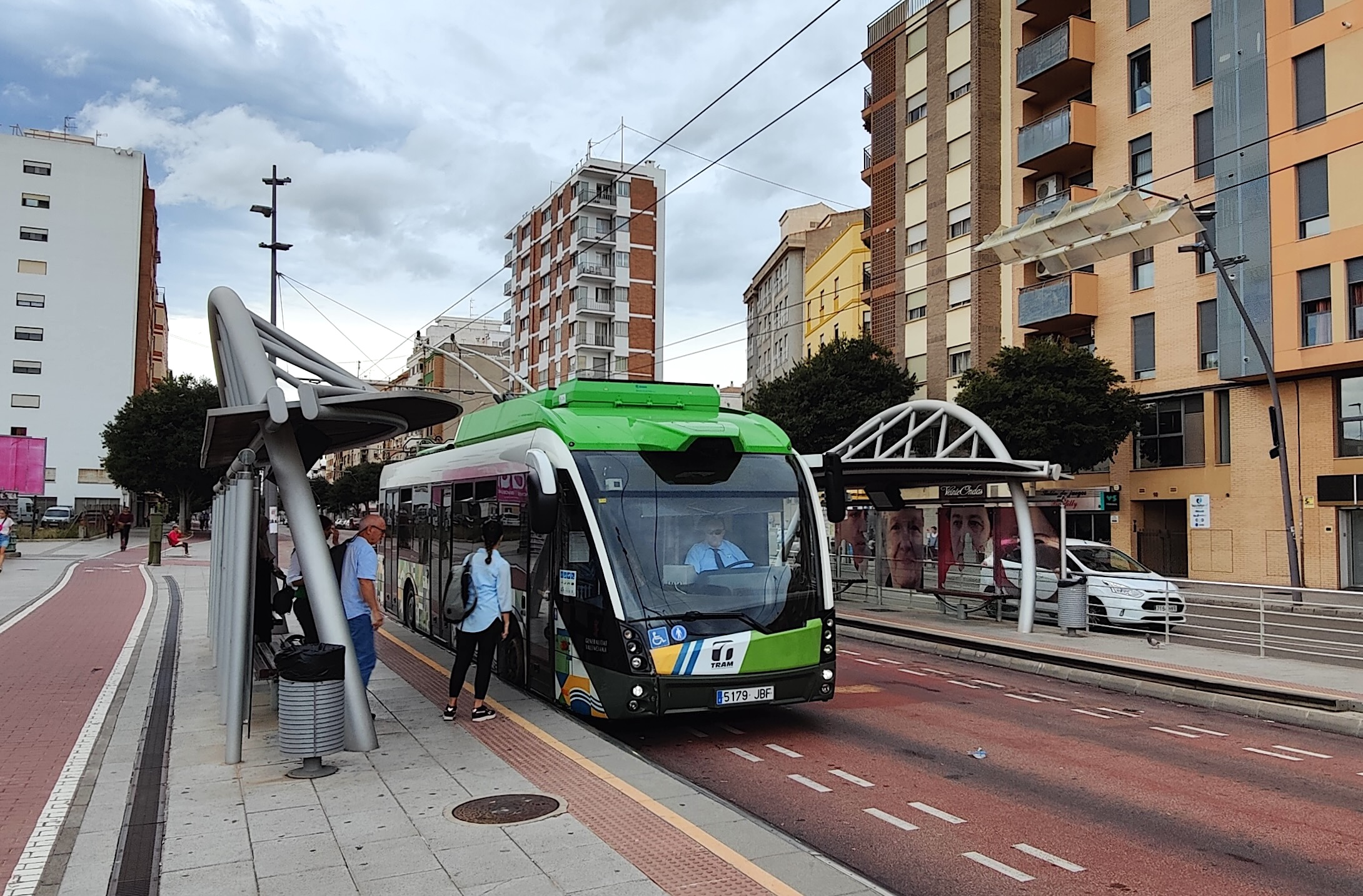
Trolleybus in Castellón de la Plana

Trolleybuses are currently in use only in Castellón de la Plana, where a new system opened on 25 June 2008; trolleybuses had previously served the town from 1961 to 1966. The Irisbus Civis vehicles are optically guided and are capable of switching to diesel power for turning in front of the Parque Ribalto.

Earlier, at least 12 trolleybus systems existed in Spain; see list. While most were urban systems, there were also some interurban lines, including a 33-km route from A Coruña to Carballo and a 12-km route from Tarragona to Reus. Until the opening of the second Castellón system, in 2008, the last Spanish system to operate had been the one in Pontevedra, which closed in 1989. In the 1960s and 1970s, more than 100 secondhand London double-deck trolleybuses operated on various Spanish systems.

=== Sweden ===
In Landskrona, a single trolleybus route connects the railway station with the city centre and the wharf area. The system opened in 2003 and initially employed just three trolleybuses, making it one of the world's smallest systems; by September 2013, the fleet had been expanded to five trolleybuses. Forty years earlier, trolleybus systems existed in Gothenburg and Stockholm, the latter a large system with 12 routes.

=== Switzerland ===
NAW Hess Trolleybus with Trailer in Lucerne

Hess lighTram in St. Gallen

Trolleybuses are in use in cities including Lausanne (10 lines), Lucerne (7 lines), Geneva (6 lines), Zürich (6 lines), Bern (5 lines), St. Gallen (8 lines), Neuchâtel (4 lines), Winterthur (4 lines), Fribourg (3 lines), La Chaux-de-Fonds (3 lines), Biel (2 lines), Schaffhausen (1 line), Vevey–Montreux (1 line).

The last trolleybus ran in Lugano in June 2001, and in Basel, where they have been replaced by natural gas-powered buses, on 30 June 2008. These are the only urban networks that have been closed in Switzerland. Operation of the La Chaux-de-Fonds system was suspended in 2014, with permanent closure under consideration, but local officials eventually decided to reopen the system (with new vehicles), and that took place in 2026.

In Lausanne, the Association RétroBus has preserved several vintage trolleybuses, the oldest example being a 1932 FBW, and in the 2000s operated them periodically on public excursions, especially on summer weekends.

=== Turkey ===
- (See: Eurasia/Turkey section)

Trolleybuses have operated in four cities in the Asian part of Turkey and one in the European part. See the Eurasia section of this article, above.

=== Ukraine ===
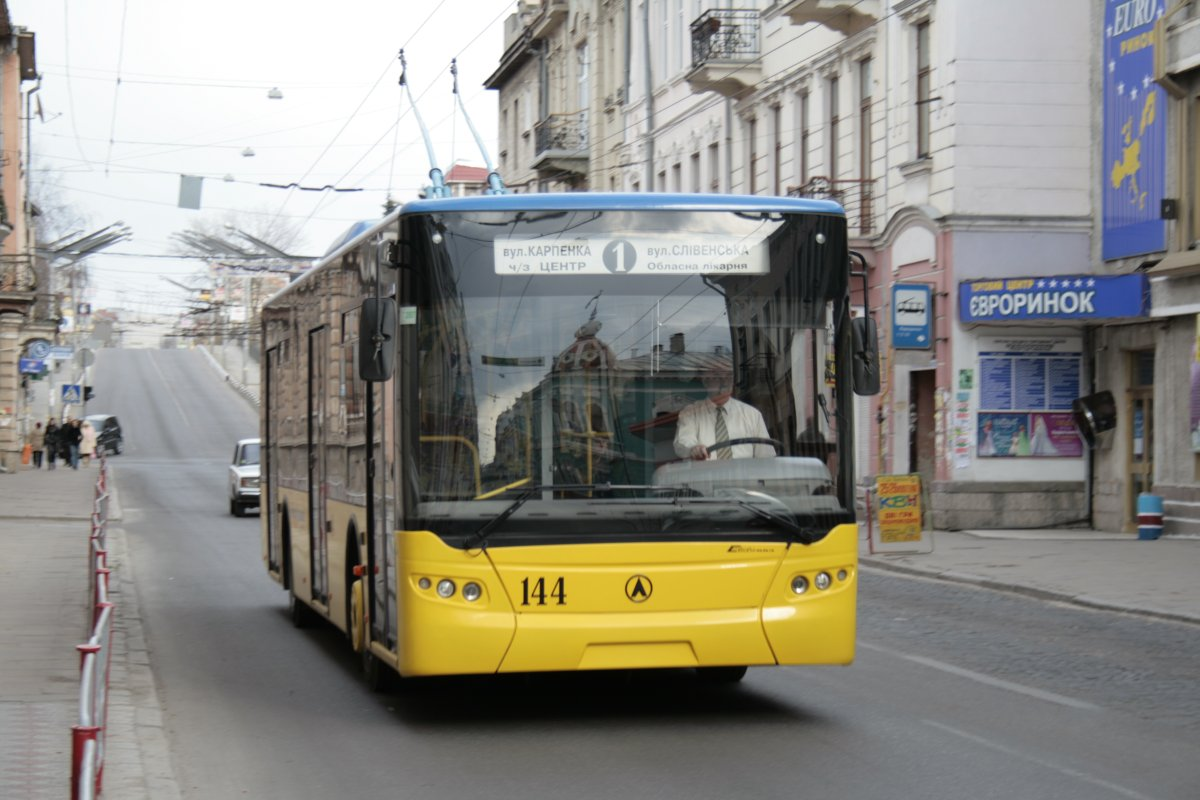
LAZ trolleybus in Ternopil

Trolleybus systems run in 35 cities (in 2012, it was more than 40), including the interurban Crimean network connecting Simferopol with Alushta and Yalta on the coast. The Crimean trolleybus network includes the longest trolleybus route in the world, the 86-km (54 mi.) route from Yalta to Simferopol.

=== United Kingdom ===
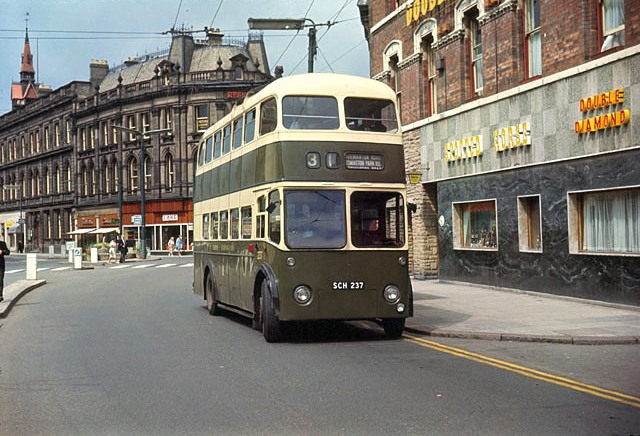
A Derby Corporation trolleybus in 1967. This vehicle is preserved in running order at the Black Country Living Museum.

No trolleybus systems are in operation. A new Leeds trolleybus system was given preliminary government approval and funding in March 2010, but cancelled in 2016.

In the past, more than 50 systems existed and a large number of trolleybuses have been preserved at British museums. The last trolleybuses in Britain ran in Bradford in 1972. The world's largest collection of preserved trolleybuses is at The Trolleybus Museum at Sandtoft in England. Examples are also preserved at the East Anglia Transport Museum and the Black Country Living Museum in England.

== North America ==
=== Canada ===
Vancouver is currently the only Canadian city operating trolleybuses. Edmonton was the most recent city to abandon its trolleybus network, ending service in May 2009, despite opposition from local citizens.

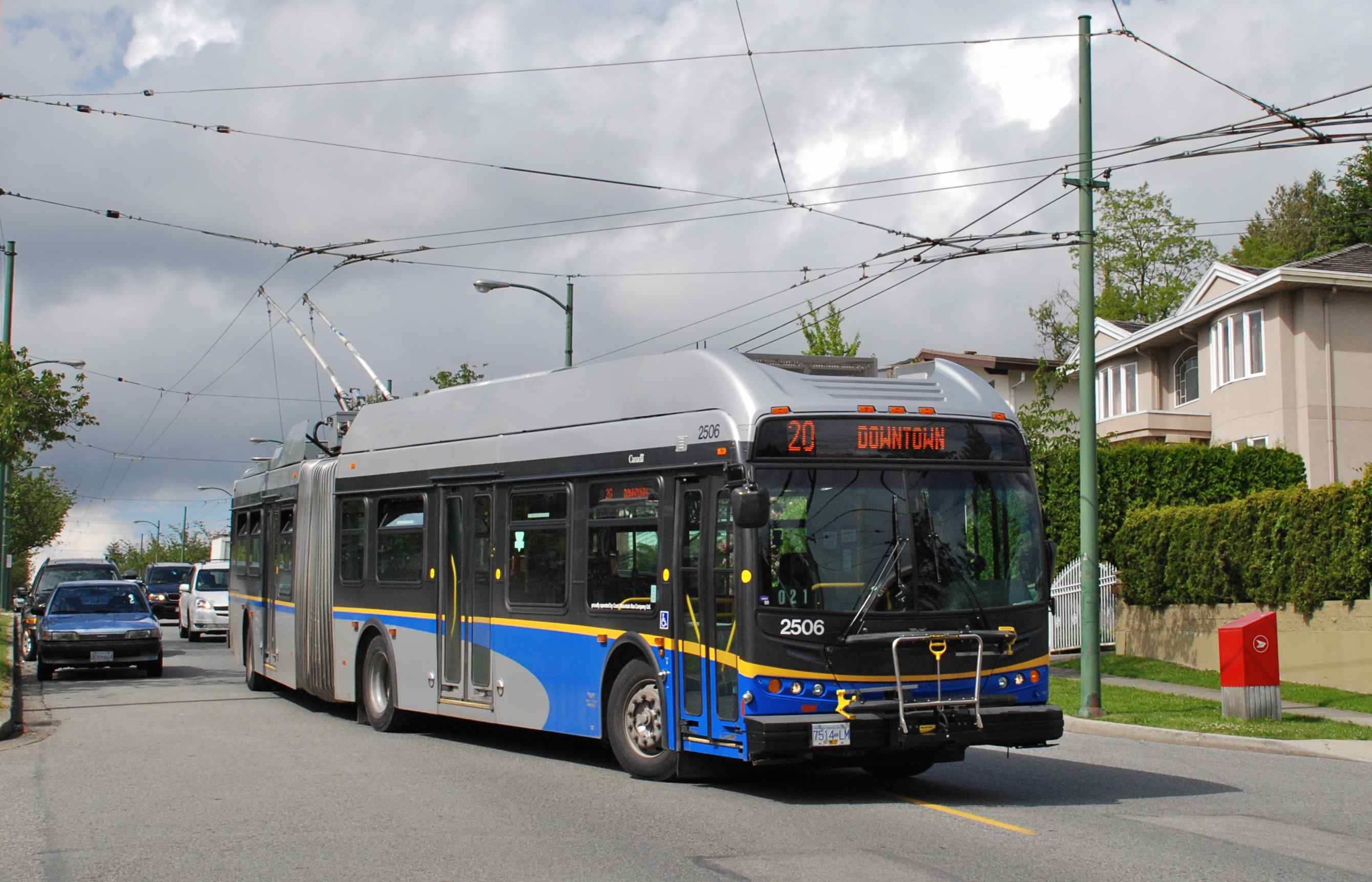
One of Vancouver's New Flyer E60LFR articulated trolleybuses, on route 20.

In Vancouver, TransLink operates a fleet of 262 vehicles, locally known as "trolleys". The city's aging trolley fleet was replaced in 2006–2009 with new low-floor models built in Canada by New Flyer, including 74 articulated units. The trolleys are valued in the Vancouver transit network for their "greener" energy usage and emissions (relying on hydro-electric power), their quieter operation over diesels, and their high-torque electric motors, well-suited to hilly areas of the city.

Several other Canadian cities have operated trolleybus systems in the past. In Hamilton, where they were referred to as "trolley coaches", they were used from 1950 until the end of 1992. Toronto initially had an experimental fleet of four trolleybuses from 1922 to 1925, but later the Toronto trolleybus system was a much larger system, lasting from 1947 to 1993 and with a maximum fleet of around 150 vehicles. Montreal was served by trolleybuses from 1937 until 1966. Most of Canada's other trolleybus systems were abandoned during the 1960s and 1970s; the last two to disappear at that time (Saskatoon and Calgary) closed down in 1974 and 1975, respectively.

In 2009–2011, proposals to construct new trolleybus systems in Laval, Quebec (within the Greater Montreal area) and in the city of Montréal proper were studied, but ultimately the proposed systems did not come to fruition.

The Transit Museum Society, in Vancouver, has preserved at least five trolleybuses retired from service on that city's trolleybus system, and some are maintained in running condition for occasional operation on the system, in cooperation with the transit agency, TransLink. Several trolleybuses from the former Edmonton system have also been preserved in that city.

=== Mexico ===
Servicio de Transportes Eléctricos (STE) of Mexico City is one of the largest systems in North America. In the 1960s and 1970s STE acquired trolleybuses withdrawn from service in many Canadian and U.S. cities, including Montreal, Winnipeg, Cleveland, Dallas, Indianapolis, Johnstown, Little Rock, Los Angeles, Milwaukee, New Orleans, Shreveport and San Francisco, and placed them in service in Mexico City, following these later with a similar acquisition of 37 Flyers from Edmonton in 1987. Since 1981 more than 700 trolleybuses have been purchased from Mexicana de Autobuses S.A. (MASA), fitted with electrical equipment by various suppliers (including Hitachi, Toshiba, Kiepe and Mitsubishi) for batches of vehicles ordered at different times. The size of the fleet in 2008 was around 400. More recently, the system's first low-floor trolleybuses entered service. Sixty-three new two-axle trolleybuses built in China by Yutong entered service in late 2019 and early 2020, and in 2020 STE placed orders for an additional 80 two-axle and 50 articulated Yutong trolleybuses.

Guadalajara opened a trolleybus system in 1976 using ex-Chicago Marmon-Herrington trolleybuses dating from 1951–52. New MASA trolleybuses were added to the fleet over the period 1982–85, and the last Marmons were withdrawn in January 1993. In 2015, a series of 25 low-floor trolleybuses built by DINA (of Mexico) and Škoda (of the Czech Republic) replaced the previous fleet.

=== United States ===
Since the opening of the first system – a relatively short-lived one opened in 1910 in Los Angeles – approximately 65 cities in the United States have been served by trolleybuses, in some instances by two or more independent systems operated by different private companies.

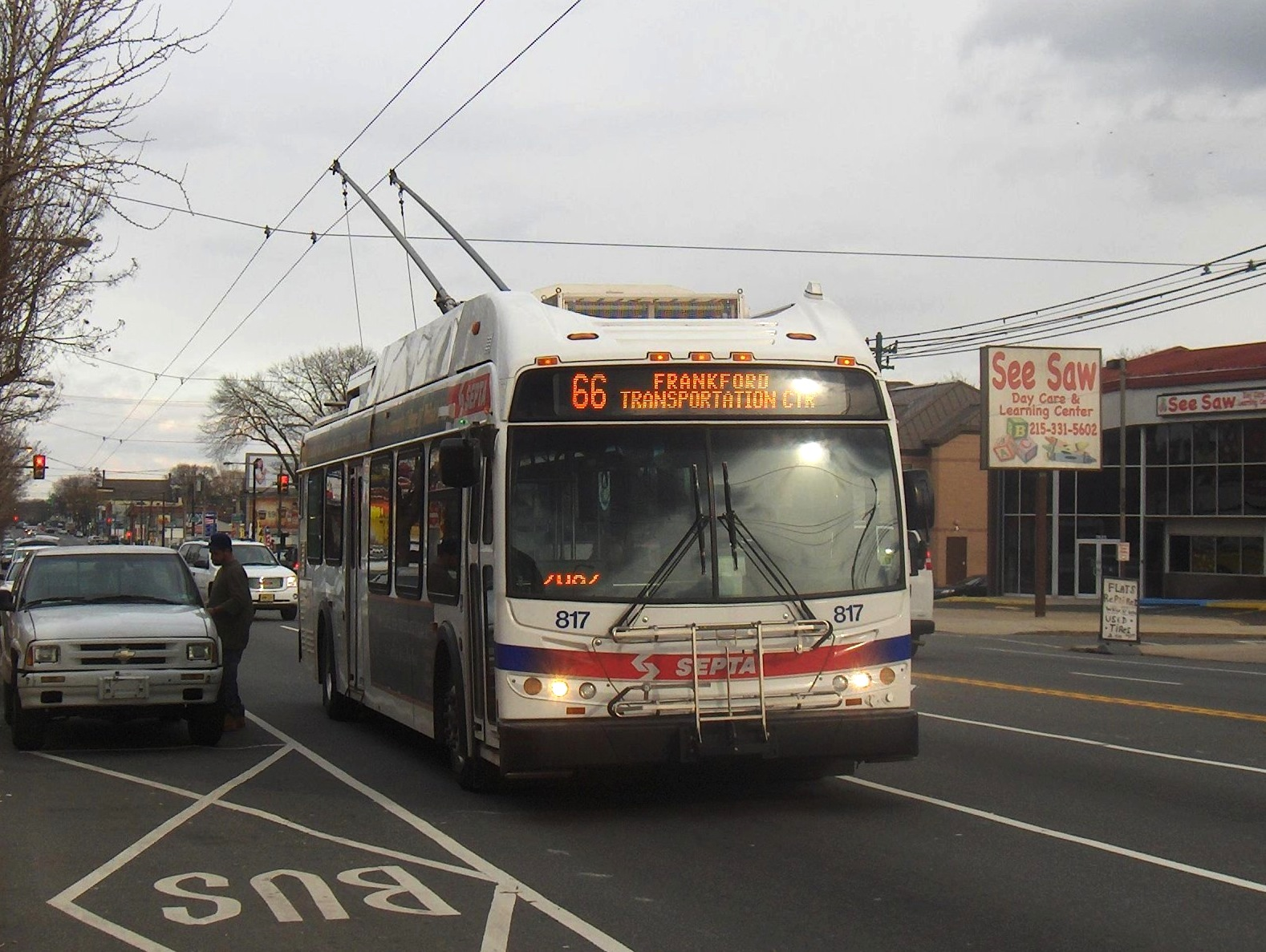
SEPTA trackless trolley on Frankford Avenue in Philadelphia in 2010

Trolleybus systems are currently in operation in four U.S. metropolitan areas:

- Philadelphia, Pennsylvania, operated by SEPTA; see Trolleybuses in Philadelphia.
- San Francisco, California, operated by San Francisco Muni; see Trolleybuses in San Francisco.
- Seattle, Washington, operated by King County Metro; see Trolleybuses in Seattle.
- Dayton, Ohio, operated by Greater Dayton Regional Transit Authority; see Trolleybuses in Dayton.

==== Preservation ====
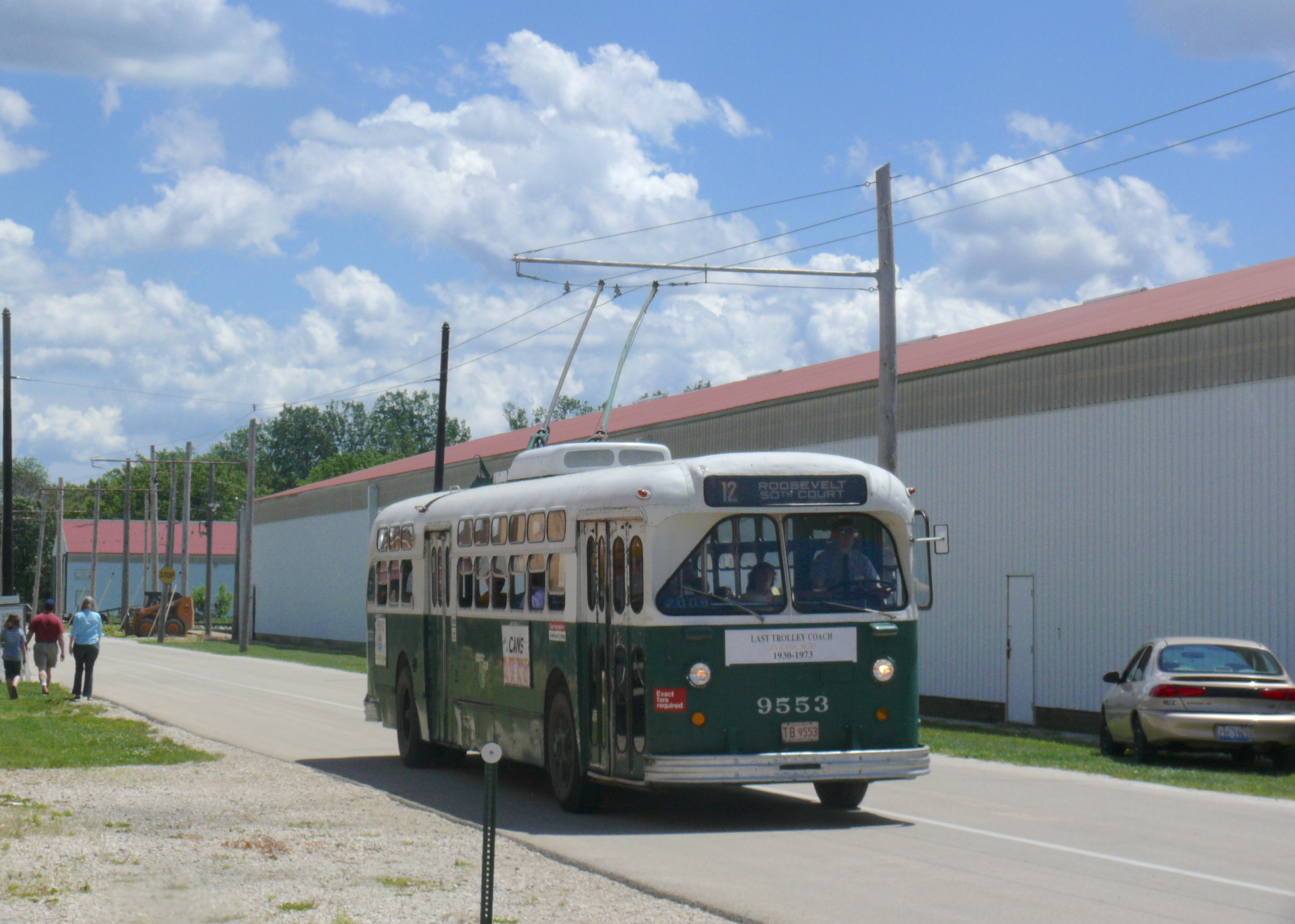
An ex-Chicago trolleybus in operation at the Illinois Railway Museum

- The Illinois Railway Museum in Union maintains an historical collection of 20 trolleybuses from Chicago, Dayton, Cleveland, Des Moines, Vancouver, Toronto, Seattle, San Francisco, Edmonton and Milwaukee. Several of the preserved coaches are operable and periodically provide rides for visitors over the museum's 0.6-mile (1 km) demonstration line, such service usually being scheduled on the first Saturday of June, July, September and October each year.
- There are 18 historic trolleybuses in the collection of the Seashore Trolley Museum in Kennebunkport, Maine: 15 from U.S. systems, two from Canada and one from Switzerland (plus one matching passenger trailer from Switzerland). Some are only on display or stored, but seven are in operating condition, and the museum has an approximately quarter-mile trolleybus line, on which operation takes place on about two or three weekends each year.
- In Seattle, transit authority King County Metro has preserved several historic trolleybuses and diesel buses that used to serve the city, and adds more to its collection as additional types are withdrawn from use on the Metro transit system. Volunteers from a group of current and retired employees of the agency, the Metro Employees Historic Vehicle Association (MEHVA), formed in 1981, restore and maintain the vehicles and operate them on public excursions a few times each year. As of 2009, the historic-vehicle fleet includes six trolleybuses, of which one is also a dual-mode bus.
- San Francisco Muni has a collection of six historic trolleybuses, including two Flyer E800s of mid-1970s vintage in operating condition, one 1950 Marmon-Herrington in operating condition, and three older vehicles which are not in running condition.
- A number of other museums in the United States have trolleybuses on static display only.

== Oceania ==
=== Australia ===
Australia has no remaining trolleybus systems, but such systems existed in Adelaide, Brisbane, Hobart, Launceston, Perth and Sydney. Trolleybuses are preserved in the Brisbane Tramway Museum, Sydney Tramway Museum, Powerhouse Museum (Sydney), the Tramway Museum, St Kilda (Adelaide), the Perth Electric Tramway Museum and the Bus Preservation Society of Western Australia, and at the Tasmanian Transport Museum in Hobart. Some of these historic trolleybuses are in operating condition, but there are no wired roadways on which to operate them.

=== New Zealand ===
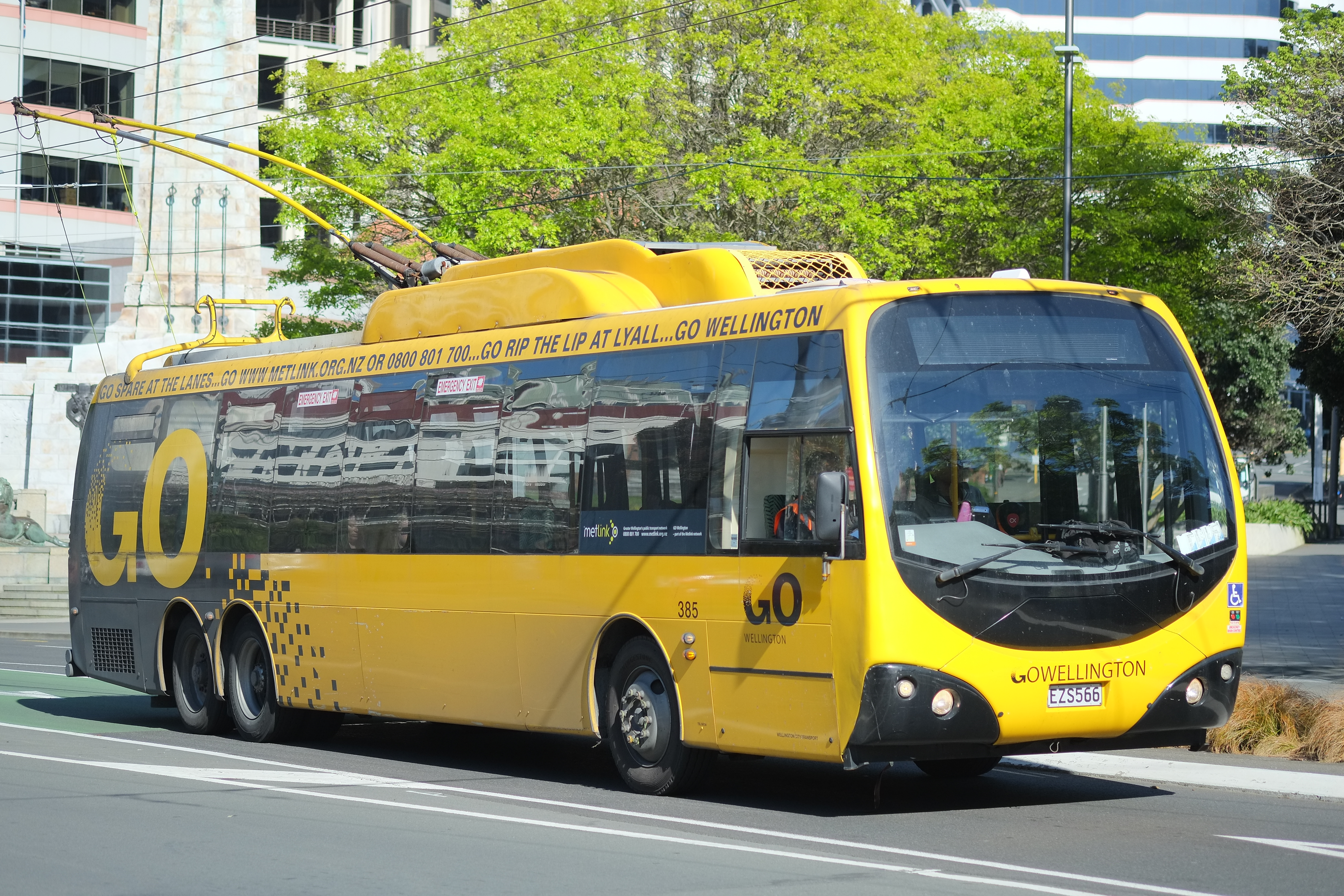
A Designline trolleybus operating in Wellington in 2017

No trolleybus systems remain, but trolleybuses at one time served Auckland, Christchurch, Dunedin, New Plymouth, and Wellington.

By 1982, only the Wellington system remained, and it was the last public trolleybus system in all of Australasia. Its final operator, GO Wellington, operated 61 Designline trolleybuses on nine suburban routes south, east and west of the city centre, until the system's closure in October 2017. The closure of the Wellington network came under heavy criticism from Wellington residents, local politicians, and international transport experts, as it gained the unwanted notoriety of being the only zero-emissions public transport system shut down after its home country signed the Paris climate accord.

In addition to systems providing public transport, a small privately owned museum-type trolleybus operation existed in Foxton, providing excursion-type rides on limited dates using preserved trolleybuses from Auckland, Dunedin and Wellington. Opened in December 1988, it was the world's first museum trolleybus line to use public streets. An extension built in 1993 came into regular use in 1995, making the line almost 1 km long in each direction. Following the death of its founder in 2008 and his son in 2012, the condition of the wiring and vehicles began to deteriorate. Operation ended in 2016 and the remaining overhead wires were removed in 2023.

Preserved trolleybuses still operate at Ferrymead Heritage Park in Christchurch. The Ferrymead collection has trolleybuses from every New Zealand city that operated trolleybuses.

== South America ==
=== Argentina ===
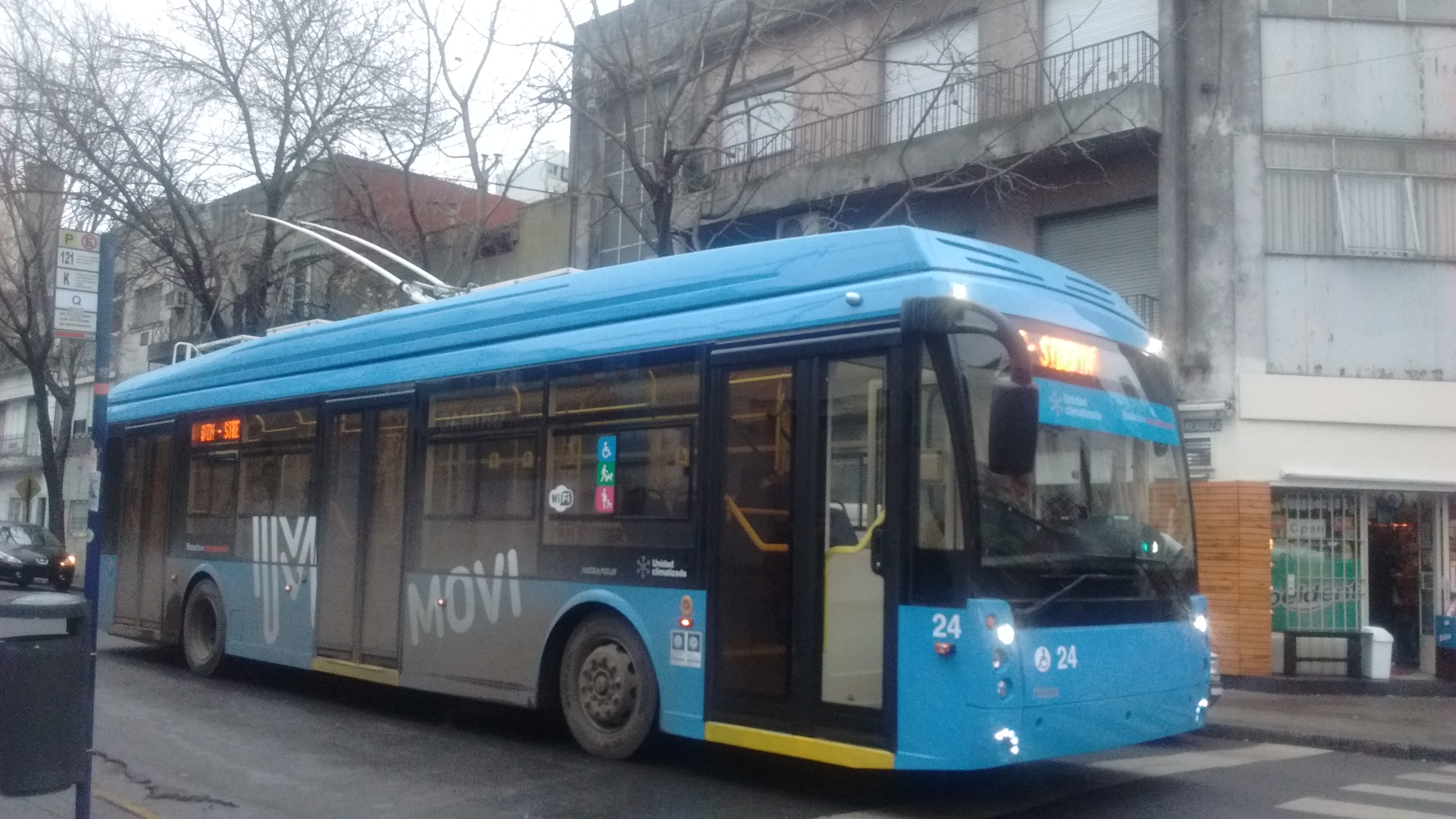
A Russian Trolza trolleybus in Rosario in 2017

Trolleybuses are currently in use in Rosario and Córdoba, on systems that opened in 1959 and 1989, respectively. Rosario has 20 Volvo units made in Brazil and 12 low-floor Trolza trolleybuses, and Córdoba uses seven Trolzas, some 30 ZIUs and a single Belkommunmash (BKM) demonstrator.

The capital of Mendoza province had the first trolleybus operation in Latin America and one of the first in the world. South American Railless Traction Co., organized in London in 1912, planned to cover the continent with trolleybus lines and built an experimental route in Mendoza in 1913. (It was the only line that it built.) It closed in 1915. A second trolleybus system in Mendoza was opened in 1958 and lasted until early 2021. In its last years it used ex-Vancouver Flyers (until 2017) and 12 Materfer low-floor units.

In 1948, the Buenos Aires city transport authority purchased 120 trolleybuses from Westram, later in 1952 the Argentine government imported 700 new trolleybuses from Germany (350 Mercedes-Benz, 175 Henschel and 175 from Maschinenfabrik Augsburg Nürnberg). Most of the vehicles ran in the capital, Buenos Aires, but about 110 were sent to provincial cities: Bahía Blanca, La Plata, Tucumán, Mar del Plata and Rosario. Later, Rosario and Mendoza bought new ones from Fiat and Toshiba.

=== Brazil ===
Trolleybuses are currently in use only in São Paulo and Santos. In São Paulo (city), there are two separate trolleybus systems, operated or regulated by two different public agencies: SPTrans, in the central and eastern areas, and EMTU, in the southeastern suburbs and the cities of Santo André, São Bernardo do Campo, Mauá and Diadema. The trolleybus system of SPTrans (formerly CMTC), which opened in 1949, is the oldest surviving trolleybus system in Latin America and also the largest system in South America. In the past, trolleybus systems existed in eleven other Brazilian cities; see list.

Two trolleybuses are preserved and exhibited at the SPTrans (São Paulo Transportation Authority) Museum at Gaetano Ferrola. Another five trolleybuses built by CMTC (SPTrans' predecessor, until 1995) and Villares between 1958 and 1965 are awaiting restoration in the SPTrans garage at Santa Rita. An ex-Denver trolleybus built in the United States by ACF-Brill in 1948 was restored in 1999 and operates during special celebrations, such as the city's 454th anniversary celebration on 25 January 2008.

=== Chile ===
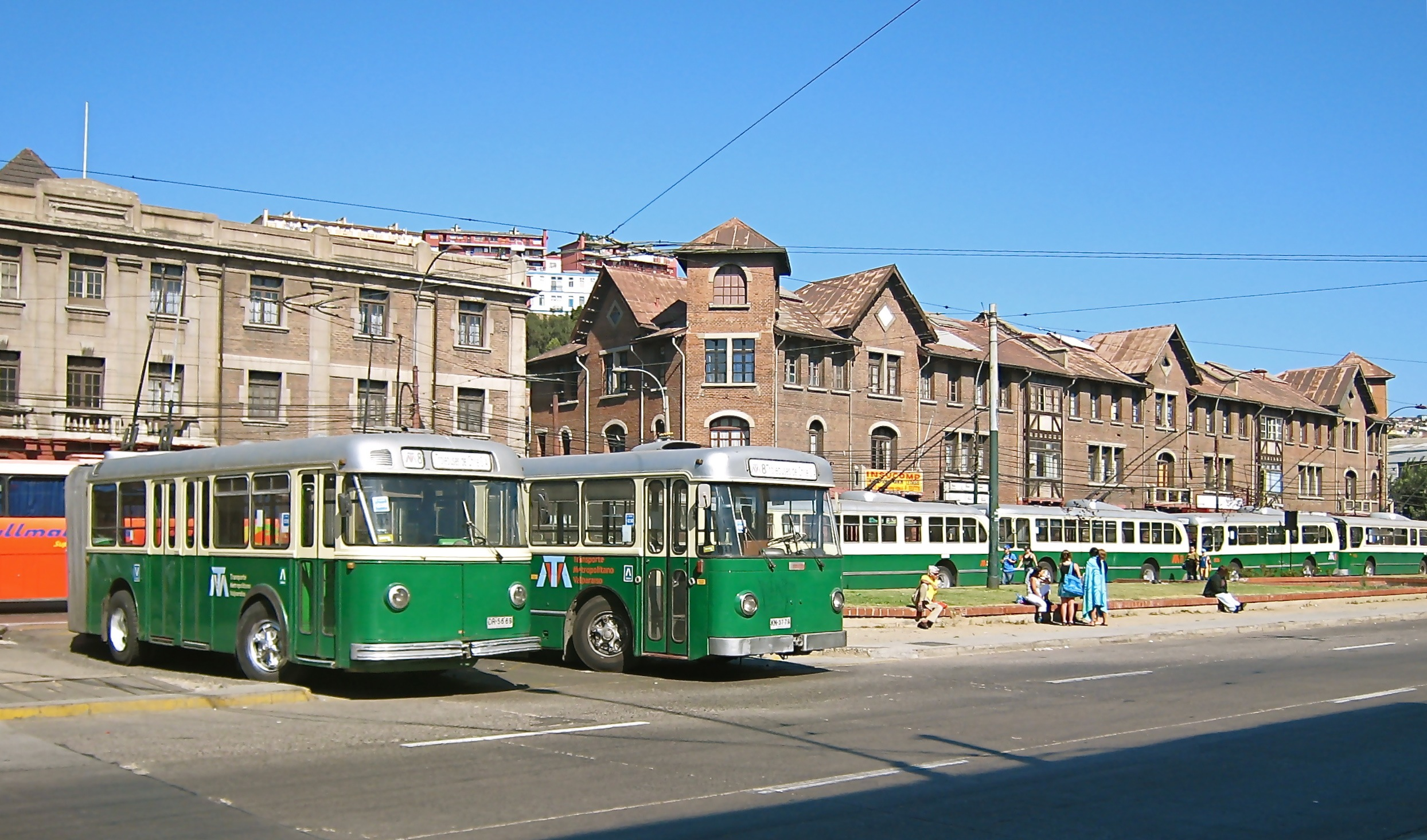
Various trolleybuses in Valparaíso, Chile. The two Swiss vehicles at left are types that were retired from service in 2015/16, followed by the last Pullman vehicles (at right) in the early 2020s.

Valparaíso, one of the largest cities of Chile, has the only trolleybus service currently, and it is managed by a private company, Trolebuses de Chile S.A. (formerly Empresa de Transportes Colectivos Eléctricos). Its two routes are numbered 801 and 802 in the regional transport scheme and are each about 5 km in length and are identical over about half their length. From the early 1990s and for about 25 years, the fleet comprised a variety of secondhand Swiss vehicles (including some articulated) along with old American vehicles and a few Chinese units, but by 2017 it comprised a single model of two-axle Swiss trolleybus – 14–18 ex-Lucerne NAW vehicles built in 1988–89 – and nine American vehicles. The latter, now retired, were Pullman-Standards built in 1946–52 and for many years they were the oldest trolleybuses still in service anywhere in the world. They were declared national monuments in 2003. The company has faced fierce competition from bus operators, and has come close to bankruptcy a few times, but many Valparaíso inhabitants feel an emotional link to the service, and vigorously defend the trolleybuses. During one such crisis in May 2007, even the country's president, Michelle Bachelet, expressed support for keeping the historic system running. In October 2007, the Chilean government's National Monuments Council extended the national monument status to include also the system's operations infrastructure (overhead wires, support poles and substations). By the 2020s, the few remaining active examples of the city's historic Pullman trolleybuses began to become surplus to the company's needs, as the last of the NAW trolleybuses entered service and the COVID-19 pandemic and other factors caused patronage to decline. The last active Pullman trolleybus was withdrawn in March 2023.

Trolleybuses operated in Santiago from 1947–1978 and 1991–1994.

=== Colombia ===
Trolleybuses systems were operated in Medellín from 1929 to 1951 and in Bogotá (where the service was managed by the local government) from 1948 until 1991. Russian-built ZIU and Romanian-built DAC trolleybuses comprised the entire fleet in the system's last several years of operation.

=== Ecuador ===
A distinctive and heavily used trolleybus system opened in Quito in stages in 1995–96. The single-corridor Quito trolleybus system, named "El Trole", is a high-capacity design, featuring dedicated trolleybus-only lanes over almost its entire length and with boarding taking place exclusively at high-platform stations, through all three vehicle doorways simultaneously, akin to modern-day light-rail transit systems. The initial fleet of 54 articulated trolleybuses was expanded to 113 vehicles in 1999–2000. The headway is as short as 90 seconds in peak periods, and average daily patronage exceeds 250,000 passengers. Extensions to the route were opened in 2000 and 2008, and it is now 18.7 kilometres (11.6 mi) in length. Five different overlapping trolleybus services are operated along the corridor. The system inspired the design of a new trolleybus system in Mérida, Venezuela, the first stage of which opened in 2007.

=== Peru ===
A small trolleybus system operated in Lima from 1928 to 1931, using just six vehicles on a single 3.3-km route. The six trolleybuses were rebuilt as trams in 1931, the only known instance of trolleybuses' being converted into trams.

=== Trinidad and Tobago ===
Port of Spain was served by a five-route trolleybus system, which opened in 1941 and closed at the end of 1956.

=== Uruguay ===
Trolleybuses served the capital, Montevideo, from 1951 until 1992. The fleet originally included 18 British-built BUT vehicles, but Italian-built Alfa Romeo or Fiat trolleybuses were later acquired in much larger numbers and comprised the entire fleet for the system's last several years. It had the first articulated trolleybuses in South America, built between 1962 and 1967.

=== Venezuela ===
No trolleybus systems exist any more, but trolleybuses have operated in four cities, of which one was a project that only progressed as far as demonstration service before the project was cancelled.

A small trolleybus system (using only 11 vehicles) operated in Caracas from 1937 until about 1949, and a short-lived system existed in Valencia from 1941 to about 1947.

Many years later, a trolleybus system opened in Mérida in June 2007, but ceased operation in 2016. Like the 1995-opened Quito trolleybus system, the new Mérida system was a Bus Rapid Transit (BRT) system, using dedicated trolleybus-only lanes over the entire length of the route, with signals giving priority over other traffic, and with all boarding and alighting taking place at enclosed "stations". A fleet of 45 articulated trolleybuses built in Spain by Mercedes-Benz and Hispano Carrocera provided the service. Around June 2015, because of a combination of factors, including electricity rationing and thefts of overhead wiring during periods of civil unrest, diesel buses began to be used on the trolleybus line, and by October 2015 they were providing about half of the service. Trolleybus operation became sporadic in 2016. By August, it had ceased entirely, and was not expected to resume.

A similar new trolleybus BRT system, Transbarca, was planned in Barquisimeto, and was intermittently under construction for several years, but the project's trolleybus component was cancelled in 2013, replaced by non-trolleybus BRT. For the planned 22 km route, 80 articulated trolleybuses were purchased from Neoplan, in Germany, and construction of the system began in 2006, but financial and political issues subsequently caused several long suspensions of work. By mid-2010, expenditures on the project had far exceeded the predicted amount and yet the first phase was only 23 percent completed. Although a free demonstration service was introduced in November 2012, serving three stops and operating for only two hours per day, using 10–15 vehicles, it ceased operating within a few months. Ultimately, the planned trolleybus system never opened, the project being cancelled in July 2013 by a new Venezuelan Minister of Transport. In addition to reasons of cost, an inadequate supply of electricity with which to power the system was cited in the announcement of the decision.

== See also ==
- List of trolleybus systems – for all-time lists, by country, of every trolleybus system ever known to have existed
