= Trolleybuses in Ulaanbaatar =

Bus transportation system in Ulaanbaatar, Mongolia

Ulaanbaatar trolleybus system
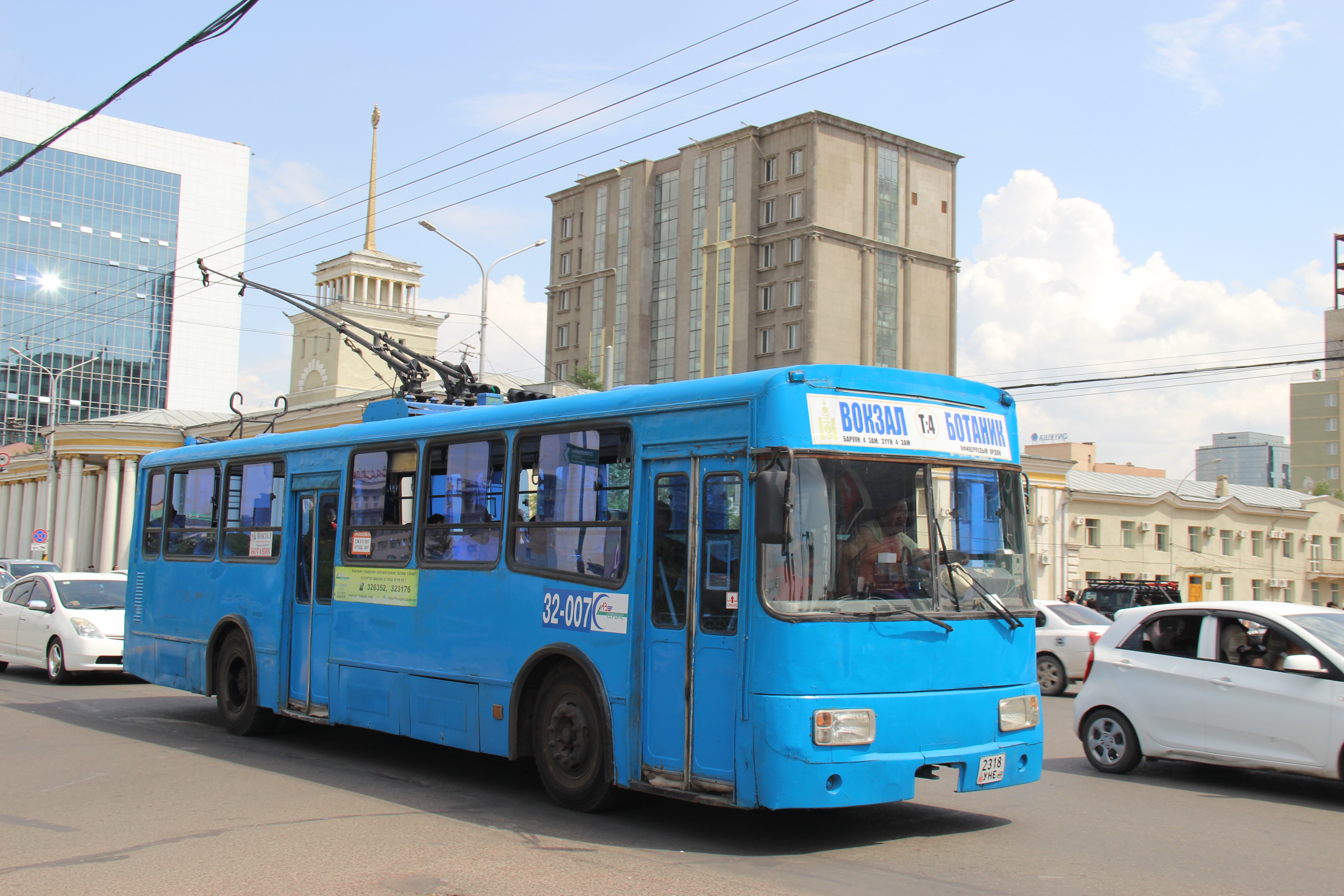
- A route 4 trolleybus near the Mongolian Ministry of Foreign Affairs, 2017.

Operation
- Locale: Ulaanbaatar, Mongolia
- Open: October 29, 1987
- Status: Open
- Routes: 4

The Ulaanbaatar trolleybus system forms part of the public transport network in Ulaanbaatar, the capital city of Mongolia. It is Mongolia's only trolleybus system.

== History ==
Opened on 29 October 1987, the system was originally operated by about 40 ZiU-9 type trolleybuses, imported from the then Soviet Union. Since 2007, newer trolleybuses have joined the fleet.

== Lines ==
The system is made up of the following lines: 2, 4 and 5.

JEA 800D trolleybus

== Fleet ==
The ZiU-9 type trolleybuses used to be the mainstay of the fleet, like it did in Soviet Union and it's satellite states. In 2007, they were joined by several secondhand Hyundai Aero City 540 from South Korea, converted from diesel power using electrical equipment removed from some of the ZiU-9s. A small number of additional ZiU trolleybuses, and two AKSM trolleybuses, were also added to the fleet. As of 2024 the fleet seems to be consisting entirely, or almost entirely, of new JEA 800D trolleybuses.

Due to their strength, the trolleybuses have been nicknamed "goat carts" by Ulaanbaatar residents.

== See also ==
- List of trolleybus systems
- Ulaanbaatar Metro — under construction As of 2024
