= Trolleybuses in Tehran =

Trolleybus system in Iran

Coordinates: 35°42′5″N 51°26′53″E

Tehran trolleybus system
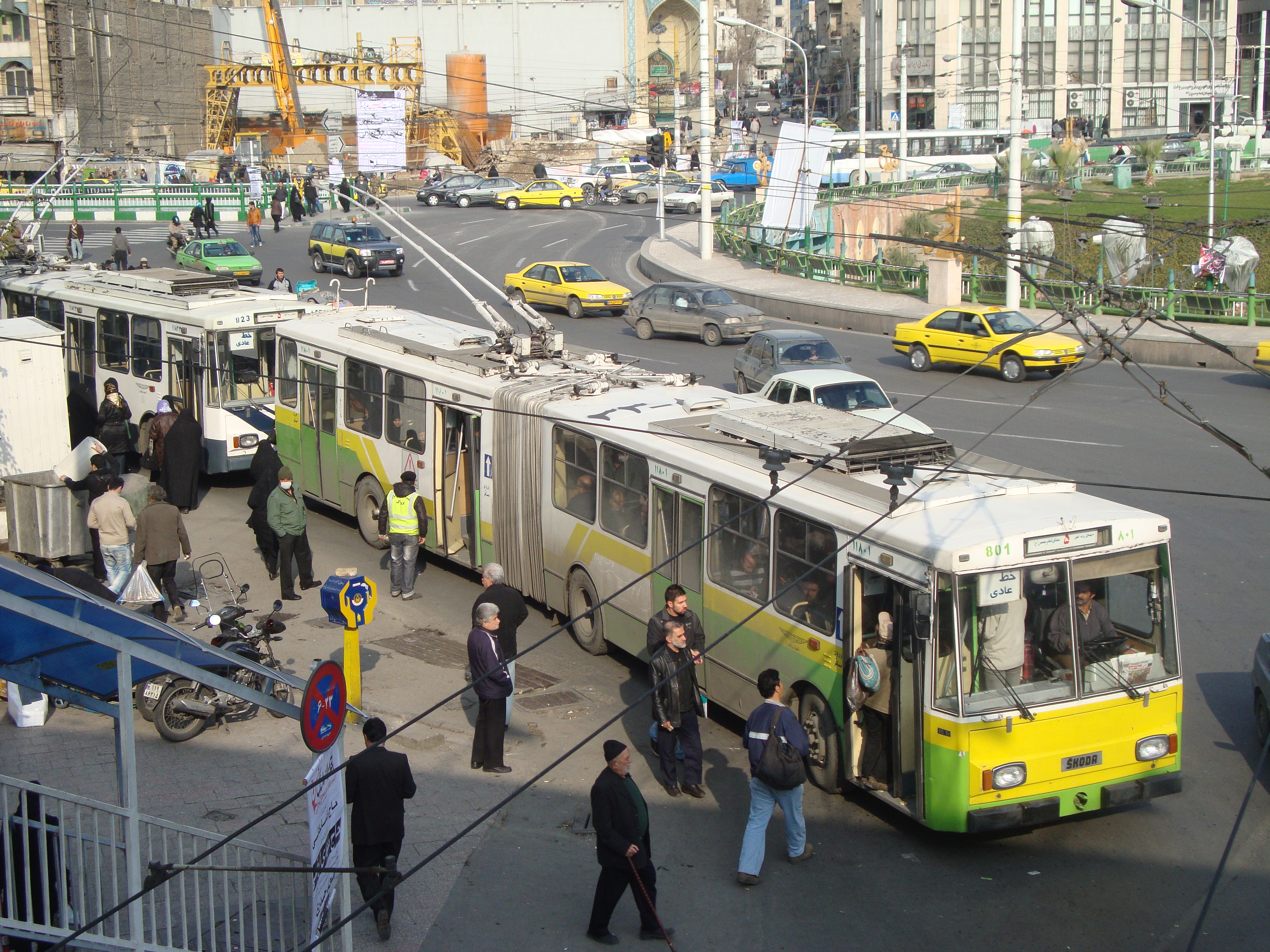
- Trolleybuses in Imam Hossein Square in 2011: northeast depot vehicle in front, south depot vehicle behind.

Operation
- Locale: Tehran, Iran
- Open: 14 September 1992; 33 years ago
- Close: 2024
- Status: Closed
- Routes: 5 (1 as of 2016)

Infrastructure
- Stock: 65 Škoda 15Tr (16 as of 2022)

Statistics
- Route length: 13.9 km (8.6 mi) (2005)

The Tehran trolleybus system (Persian:سامانهٔ اتوبوس برقی تهران, Samazh-e Atubus-e Berqi-ye Tehran) served Tehran, the capital city of Iran. Opened in 1992, it is the only trolleybus system ever to have existed in Iran. At its maximum extent, the system had five routes, served by at least 65 trolleybuses. The system closed in 2013, but reopened in 2016 with one route and a fleet of around 30 modernised Škoda 15Tr. However, in 2025 it was reported that the trolleybus system had closed again, some time during the second half of 2024. Trolleybuses were replaced with Chinese-made Higer electric buses.

== History ==
The system commenced operations on 14 September 1992, on a route about 7 km (4.3 mi) in length, between Meydan-e-Emam-Hoseyn (Imam Hossein Square) and Terminal-e-Sharq, running along Damavand Khiyaban (Damavand Street). A fleet of 35 Škoda 15Tr articulated trolleybuses opened the system, and 30 more of the same type arrived in 1992 to expand the fleet to 65 vehicles. The still-new system then grew with the opening of several more routes and extensions.

Visitors in 2014 found that the system had ceased operation, and by October at least, all of the wiring had been taken down. It was subsequently determined that the closure had apparently taken place sometime in 2013, but the exact date remains unknown. Around 10 trolleybuses were still being stored at the southern depot in October 2014. Although it was reported after the closure that a return of electric buses was planned, there was no indication, at that time, of whether these would be trolleybuses or some other type of electric bus.

In 2016, a visitor to the city in May discovered that the system had reopened, and was told that this had occurred on, or shortly after, 21 March 2016. Although around 30 vehicles were reported to have been refurbished for the reopening of the system, only three were observed in service in May 2016, running on a 1.8 km (1.1 mi) route. In April 2018, a visitor found that the service had been re-extended along another previously closed section, by about 2.5 km (1.6 mi), making the overall route in operation around 4.3 km (2.7 mi) long. Eleven refurbished trolleybuses were observed in service. However, trolleybus operation ceased again in 2024, and battery-electric buses were on order to replace the trolleybuses.

== Lines ==
=== In the 2000s ===
As of 2005, trolleybuses were operating on five routes, all starting at Meydan-e-Emam-Hoseyn (Imam Hossein Square), near Imam Hossein station of the Tehran Metro Line 2. The total route length, not counting shared sections, was 13.9 kilometres (8.6 miles).

==== Northeastern lines ====
The two routes running northeastwards, lines 1 and 2, operated almost entirely in a segregated busway located in the middle of the wide carriageway (along Damavand Khiyaban), stopping only at purpose-built stops located about every 500 metres, effectively making these routes trolleybus-BRT (but they were not called such).

Line 1 was the primary northeastern route, and was 6.9 km (4.3 mi) long. Line 2 was an express line following the same route, but serving fewer stops. Both lines terminated at Terminal-e-Sharq. Sometime between 2005 and autumn 2010, both of these routes were closed, and their wiring was taken down.

==== Southern lines ====
The other three trolleybus routes, lines 3, 4 and 5, ran south from Meydan-e-Emam-Hoseyn along Hefdah-e-Shahrivar (Shahrivar Street) and operated in mixed-traffic. Both route sections were served both by limited-stop services and local (making all stops) services.

Line 3 terminated at Meydan-e-Chorasan, and line 4 continued farther south, to Bozorgrah-e-Be'sat. Line 5 branched off Hefdah-e-Shahrivar along Khiaban-e Shush (Shush Street), and terminated initially at Meydan-e-Shush (Shush Square), which is the location of Shush Metro Station on metro line 1.

A 3.2 km (2.0 mi) extension of line 5 from Meydan-e-Shush to Meydan-e-Rah Ahan (Rah Ahan Square) and the railway station there opened in March 2010. However, at an unknown date thereafter, Meydan-e-Emam-Hoseyn (Imam Hossein Square) was converted into a pedestrian zone, and the trolleybus service was cut back by about 1 km to Meydan-e-Shohada. This deprived the trolleybus system of its main role as a fast surface connection to the metro station at Meydan-e-Emam-Hoseyn, causing a decline in ridership that is believed to have been a factor in the c. 2013 closure decision.

=== Late 2010s and 2020s ===
The system reopened on, or shortly after, 21 March 2016. In May 2016, the only service observed in operation was a 1.8-km route between Meydan-e-Khorasan (Khorasan Square) and Bozorgrah-e-Be'sat. Extensions were reported to be planned. A visitor in April 2018 found that the service had been extended from Meydan-e-Khorasan to Meydan-e-Shohada, a reinstatement of a former route section, using renewed overhead wires, adding approximately 2.5 km (1.6 mi) to the route length.

In 2025, it was reported that trolleybus operation had ceased again, sometime in the second half of 2024, and that new battery-electric buses had been acquired to replace the trolleybuses.

== Fleet ==
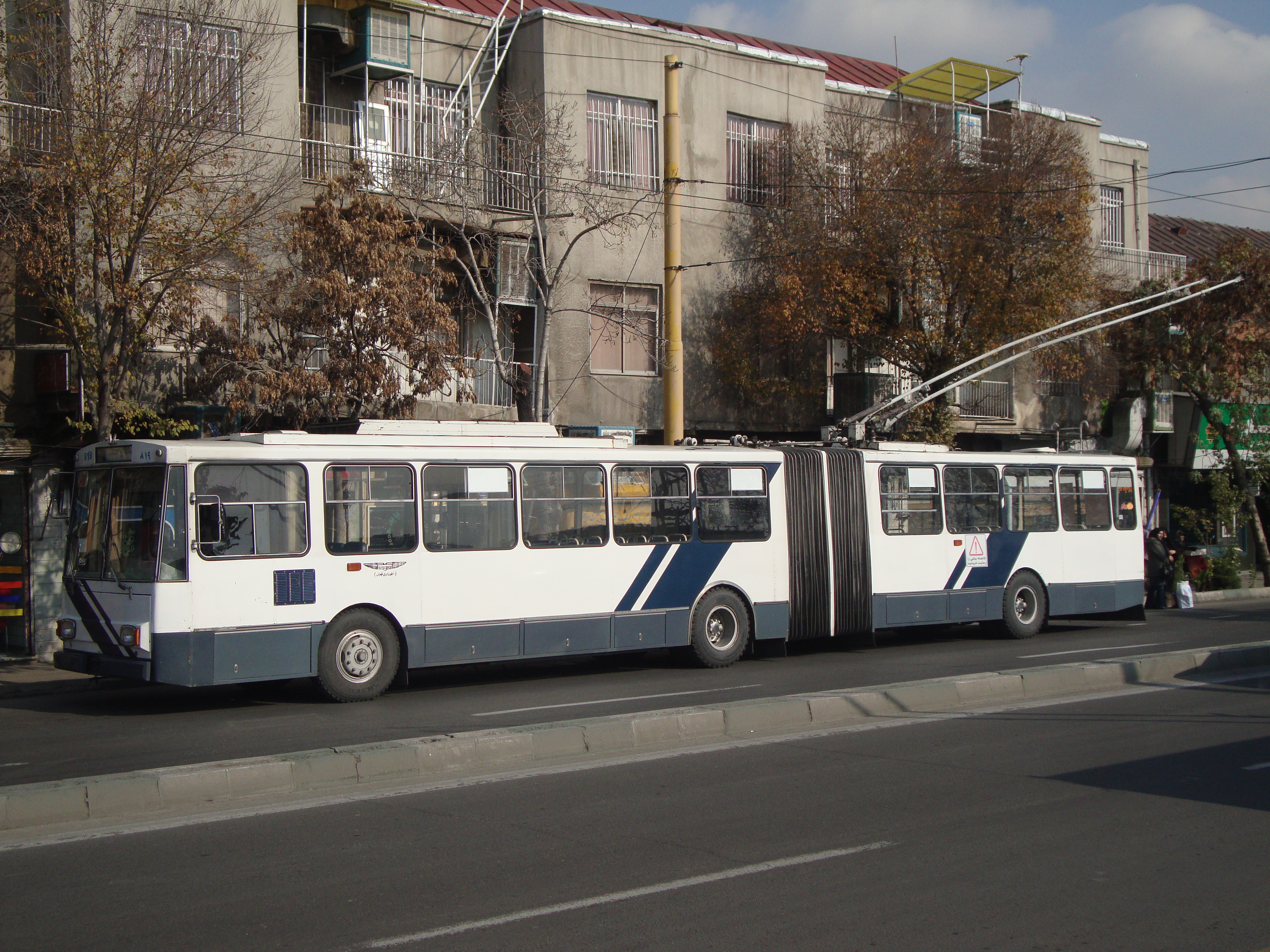
Škoda 15Tr in Rah Ahan Square (2011)

The backbone of the Tehran trolleybus fleet has been 65 Škoda 15Tr articulated buses, of which around 30 were believed to be serviceable in 2016.

The Škodas were built in the then Czechoslovakia in 1991 (fleet numbers 794–828) and 1992 (fleet numbers 921–950).

Around 2006, a two-axle prototype vehicle was built; it was based on a Volvo B10M.

At an unknown date after the 2013 suspension, refurbishment of some of the 15Tr trolleybuses began, with around 30 being refurbished by 2016, when the system reopened. The work included modernisation of their front and rear ends and the replacement of the side windows with bonded, tinted ones. They had also been repainted in a new livery of overall white, except black around the windows, with a "yellow flash" along the side and blue shading on some portions.

== Depots ==
Before the 2013 suspension, Tehran's trolleybuses were based at two depots; the two groups of vehicles could be distinguished by their liveries.

The trolleybuses used on lines 1 and 2 wore a green-yellow-white livery (the system's original livery) and were based at the northeastern depot, at Terminal-e-Sharq. These were the 1992 vehicles, carrying fleet numbers mostly in the 900 series.

Those operating lines 3, 4 and 5 were liveried blue and white (in some cases with yellow highlights) and were based at the southern depot, near Bozorgrah-e-Be'sat. They carried 800-series fleet numbers (the 1991 vehicles).

On the operation that reopened in 2016 and closed again in 2024, only the southern depot, near Bozorgrah-e-Be'sat, was in use.

== See also ==
- List of trolleybus systems
- Tehran Bus Rapid Transit
- Tehran Metro
