= Imam Hossein Square =

Public square in Tehran, Iran

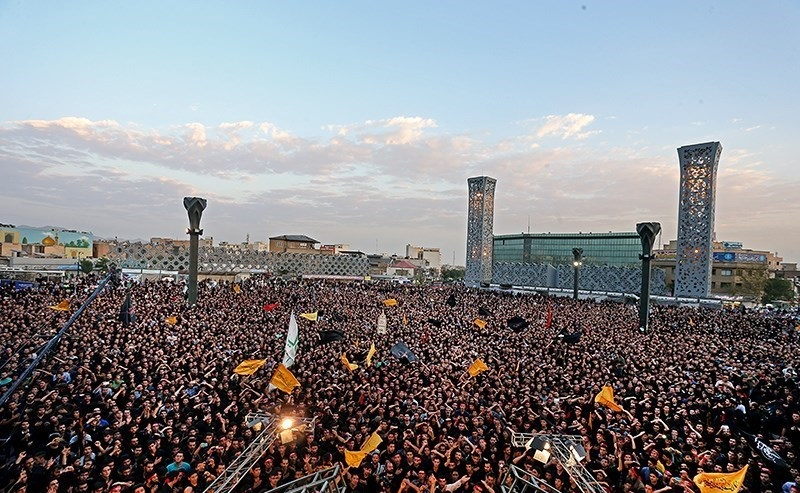
Demonstration in support of Iranian involvement in the Syrian Civil War, 2014

Imam Hossein Square, (Persian: میدان امام حسین, romanized: Meydan-e Emam Hoseyn), is a square in eastern central Tehran, Iran. It was designed by Karl Schlamminger.

== Transportation ==
- Enqelab Street
- Damavand Street
- 17 Shahrivar Street
- Mazandaran Street
- Tehran BRT Line Imam Hossein Square Station
- Imam Hossein Metro Station

=== Former ===
The Tehran trolleybus system terminated at Imam Hossein Square upon its opening in the early 1990s and as of 2005 all five routes of the system (routes 1–5) were still doing so. However, routes 1 and 2 were discontinued sometime between 2005 and 2010, and the remaining routes serving Imam Hossein Square were cut back by about 1 km to Meydan-e-Shohada at an unknown date between 2011 and 2013.

== See also ==
- Khorasan Square
