= Ekbatan (disambiguation) =

Ecbatan may refer to one of these:

- Ekbatan Complex, modern apartment buildings in the western part of Tehran, Iran.
- Ecbatana, the capital of Astyages.
- Ekbatan Metro Station, a station in Tehran Metro Line 5.
- Ekbatan F.C., an Iranian football club.
- Ekbatan (film), a 2012 Iranian movie starring Mazdak Mirabedini
