= Mahdi Ghalibafian =

Iranian engineer (1935–2007)

Mehdi Ghalibafian
- Born: 1935; Tabriz, Iran
- Died: 12 June 2007 (aged 71–72)
- Education: University of Tehran
- Known for: Pioneer in reinforced concrete in Iran
- Scientific career
- Fields: Civil engineering

Mehdi Ghalibafian (Persian: مهدی قالیبافیان, 1935 — 12 June 2007) was an Iranian civil engineer and university professor. He is credited as introducing reinforced concrete in Iran.

== Career ==
After ending elementary education, he finished his first two years of junior high school in Ferdosi High School in his birthplace Tabriz. He then moved to Tehran and completed his recent school-time in Sharaf High School. Afterwards, Ghalibafian graduated in the field of structure in civil engineering department of University of Tehran in 1959. He worked as the director of the first part of Avaj- Pahlavi road in technic corporation from November 1959 till September 1960. Succeeding that, he proceeded to design and analyze some buildings in a computational team from SANO Structural Engineers. Some of these buildings which were engineered in one and a half years consist of Philips Structure located in Enghelab Street near the Ferdowsi Square and several clinics of Social Insurances in Tehran. Philips building is the first concrete structure designed based on seismic methods in Iran.

Mahdi Ghalibafian has been considered as the father of Iranian concrete science.

He died on Tuesday 12 June 2007 at the age of 71.

== Publications ==
Dr Ghalibafian has written 18 books in Persian, two books in French, over 80 papers, one paper in French, and two papers in English about engineering, planning, construction and retrofitting and has submitted over 70 presentations in various conferences. He has worked on providing over 50 officially technical documents as listed below:

13 national standards for Institute of Standards and Industrial Research of Iran (ISIRI), 19 technical publications for Management and Planning Organization like Iranian Concrete Code (the first and the revised version), 10 subjects of national construction regulations for the ministry of housing and urban development, a proficiency standard and a didactic pamphlet for the seismic design of bridge for Tehran municipality, 5 publications in building & housing research center like Standard 519 (minimum load on buildings) and the first and the revised version of Standard 2800 (Iranian code for seismic resistance design of building).
