= Ferdowsi Metro Station =

Station of the Tehran Metro

Ferdowsi Metro Station ایستگاه مترو فردوسی Aystegah-e Mitru-ye Ferdusi
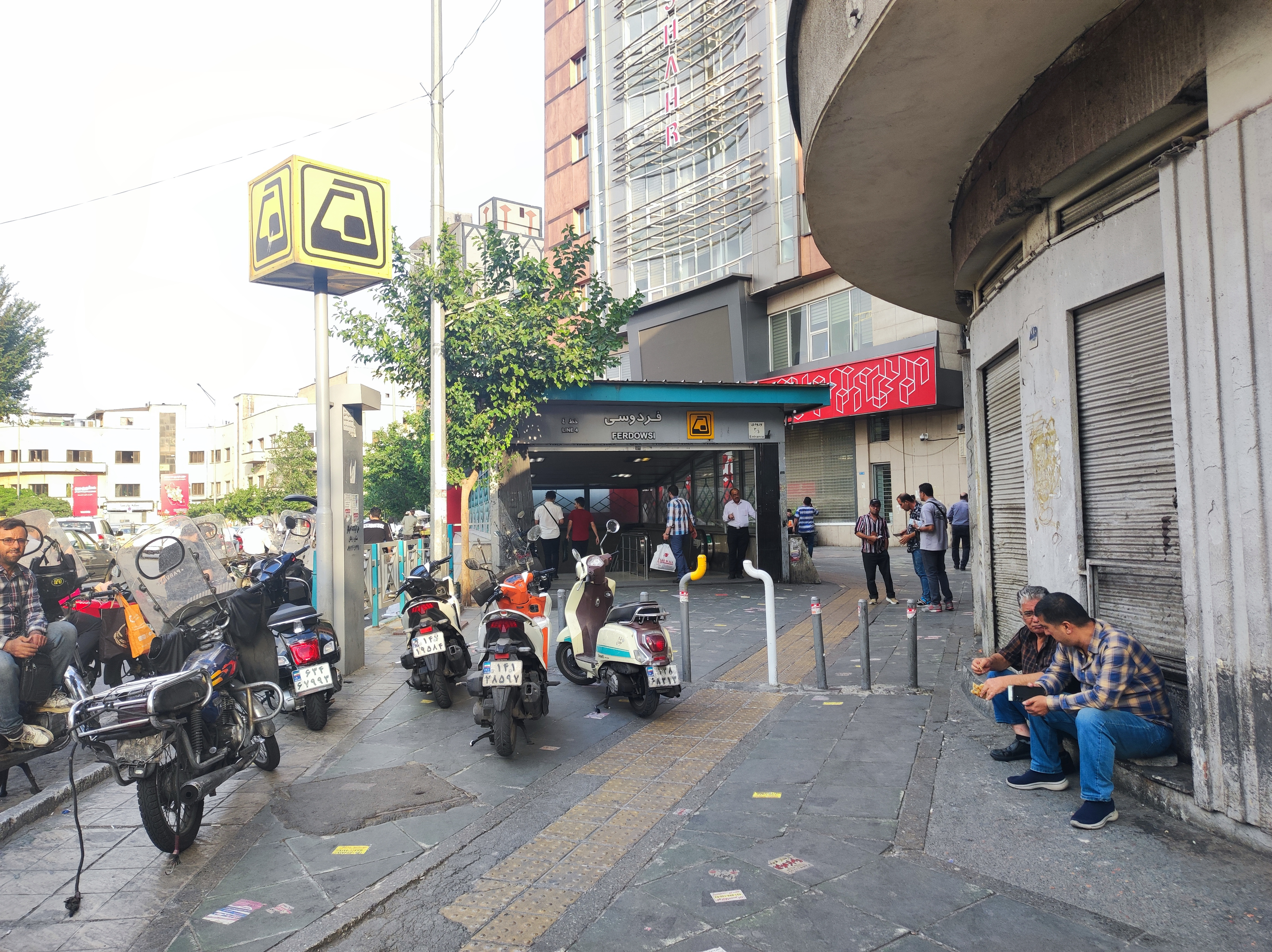
- One of the entrances to Ferdowsi Metro Station in Tehran

General information
- Location: Ferdowsi Square, Districts 6-12, Tehran; Tehran Province, Iran
- Coordinates: 35°42′06″N 51°25′09″E
- System: Tehran Metro Station
- Operator: Tehran Urban and Suburban Railways Organization (Metro)

History
- Opened: 1386 H-Kh (2007)

Services
Preceding station	Tehran Metro	Following station
Teatr-e Shahr towards Allameh Jafari	Line 4	Darvazeh Dowlat towards Shahid Kolahdooz
Location

Ferdowsi Metro Station is a station in Tehran Metro Line 4. It is located in Ferdowsi Square the junction of Enghelab Street and Ferdowsi Street. It is between Darvaze Dolat Metro Station and Teatr-e Shahr Metro Station. It has connection to Tehran Bus BRT1.
