= Tohid Tunnel =

Tunnel in Tehran, Iran

Coordinates: 35°41′34″N 51°22′44″E

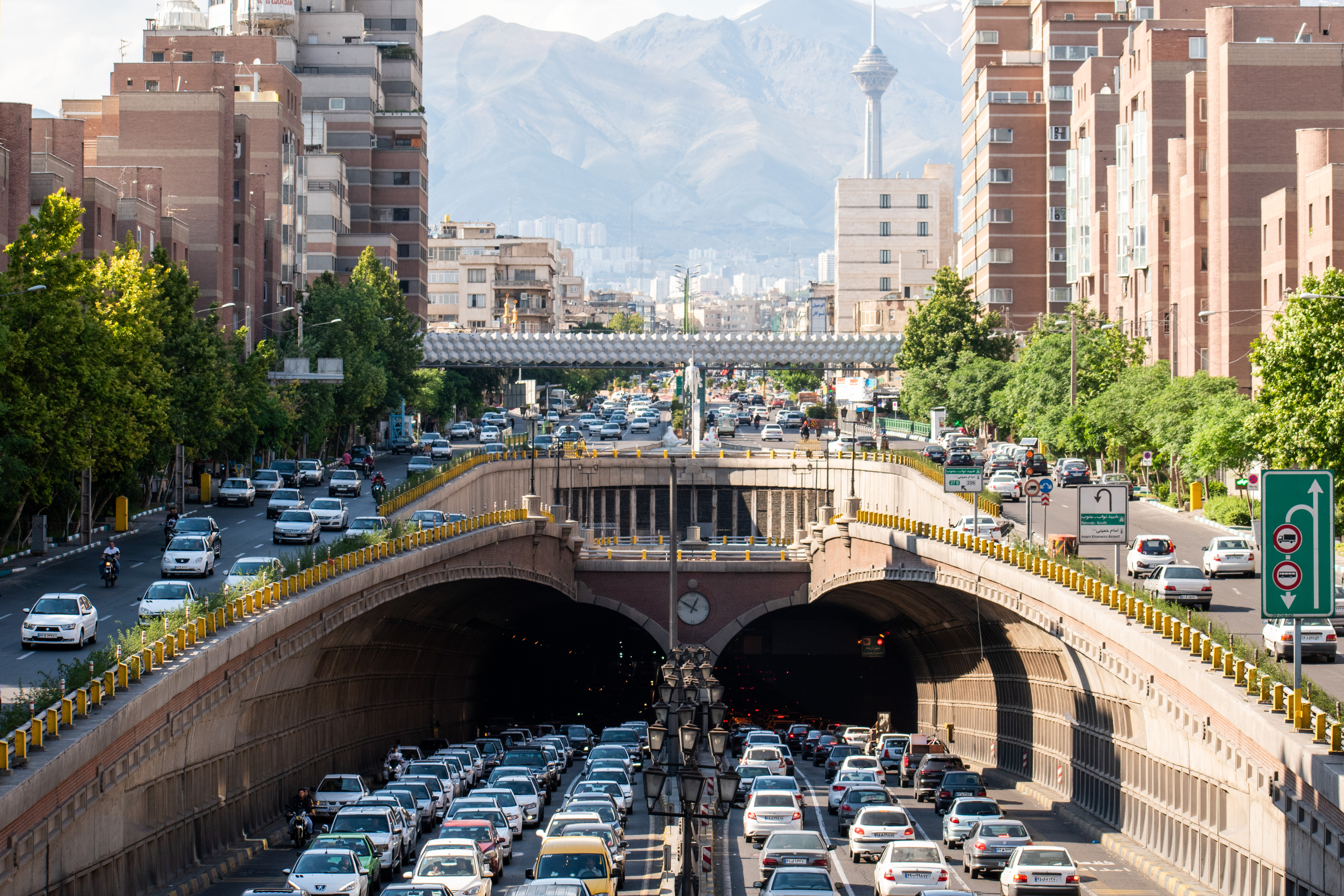

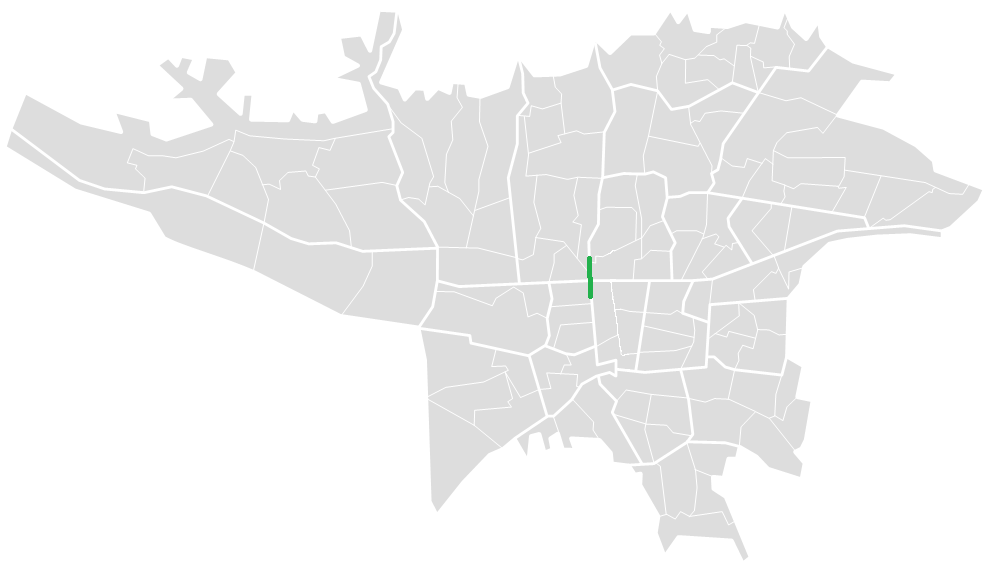

Tohid (or Towheed) Tunnel is a tunnel in Tehran, Iran, the third longest urban tunnel in the Middle East. Towheed Tunnel Project is an urban underground structure, located within the area of Chamran Highway, Towheed Square, Jomhouri Square, and Navab Highway, with a length of about 3 km (Tunnel + entry ramps). Tohid Tunnel broke construction records when it was opened in less than 30 months. The interior designs met the highest safety requirements. It includes installation of utilities equipment in the Tunnel, and manufacture and mobilization of north and south fans combined ventilation equipment, and control building and Niyayesh shaft.

== Towheed Tunnel Construction Project ==
The construction site of this Project was located within the distance between Fatemi Ave. in the north of Towheed Square, and Navab Highway in the south of Azerbaijan street junction.

Subsequent to studied on the Comprehensive Plan of Tehran, in order to make an easy access from the north to the south of Tehran and vice versa, along the north–south corridor, between Chamran Highway constructed during the 70s, and Navab Highway constructed during the 90s, sufficient studies were made by Tehran Municipality in 1998 so that the connection of the said two Highways, i.e. to fill the gap between Towheed Square to Jomhouri Square becomes practicable and operational.

The significance of the above issue, the congested traffic on Tehran highways, and the intense exigency of Tehran as a metropolitan city to have the above Highways connected, made Tehran Municipality to launch exhaustive studies to tackle such purpose, and by comparing the existing alternatives, the best alternative which was construction of a tunnel similar to Tehran Ressalat Short Tunnel, was adopted and approved.

To this end, in early 2007, a Contractor (Perlite) was assigned to construct the Project, and on 11.06.2007 the contract to kick off the Project was signed and notified to the Contractor, whereby on 19.06.2007 the construction works of Towheed Tunnel Project were actually commenced.

== Ventilation ==
70 jet fans, each powered at 30 KW. North fan combined ventilation equipment: 3 axial fans, powered at 600 KW. Niyayesh fan combined ventilation equipment: 2 axial fans (to let in fresh air into Tunnel) powered at 410 KW. 4 axial fans (to let out exhaust air from Tunnel) powered at 500 KW. South portal fan combined ventilation equipment: 3 axial fans powered at 990 KW. Air washing system at the air entering Niyayesh fans.

== Electrical ==
Total number of lights in the Tunnel: 1,064 lights powered at 550 KW. Length of cables for the utilities: 220 km. Special and standby power generators (in case of a power cut in Tehran Power Grid, the lighting system of the Tunnel fed by these generators will be automatically switched on and the power will be compensated). Smart firefighting system. Traffic alarms. Intercom telephones. Closed-Circuit TV. Vehicles counter. Road closing system. Traffic signs. Thermal sensors. Air pollution sensors and other facilities.

== Tunnel Drainage System ==
Towheed drainage system operates by various channels. The surface water accumulated around and the Tunnel will be drained into the canals installed along the Tunnel wall, and will enter into a channel which is installed exactly in the middle of both twin tunnels. The drained water will be conveyed through the latter channel to the south part of the Tunnel, and it will be carried away from the Tunnel by some kanats.

== General Specifications ==
- Client: Engineering and Construction Division of Tehran Municipality
- Project Manager: Operational Management of Engineering Structures Co. (Maram)
- EPC Contractor: Perlite Company, assigned with the above task in respect of its precedent successful quality achievement in the construction Tehran Ressalat Tunnel Project.
- Excavation: 720,000 m3
- Length of Piling: 26,000 m
- Formwork: 56,000 m3
- Rebar: 28,000 tons
- Strengthened Structure and Framing: 15,000 tons
- Concrete Placement: 230,000 m3
- Shotcrete: 450,000 m3
- Mesh: 250,000 m3
- Concrete Precast Segments: 60,000 m3

== Tohid Tunnel Local street (Tohid Street) connections ==
From North to South
Chamran Expressway
	Fatemi Street
	Baqer Khan Street
Tehran BRT Line Bagher Khan Station
	Sattar Khan Street; Nosrat Street
	Azadi Street
Tehran BRT Line Azadi Station
Tohid Metro Station
Tehran BRT Line Jomhuri Square Station
Jomhuri Square	Jomhuri Street
	Azarbaijan Street
Navvab Metro Station
	Dampezeshki Street
Navvab Expressway
From South to North
