= Meydan-e Enghelab-e Eslami Metro Station =

Station of the Tehran Metro

Coordinates: 35.7011°N 51.3897°E

Meydan-e Enghelab-e Eslami Metro Station ایستگاه مترو میدان انقلاب اسلامی
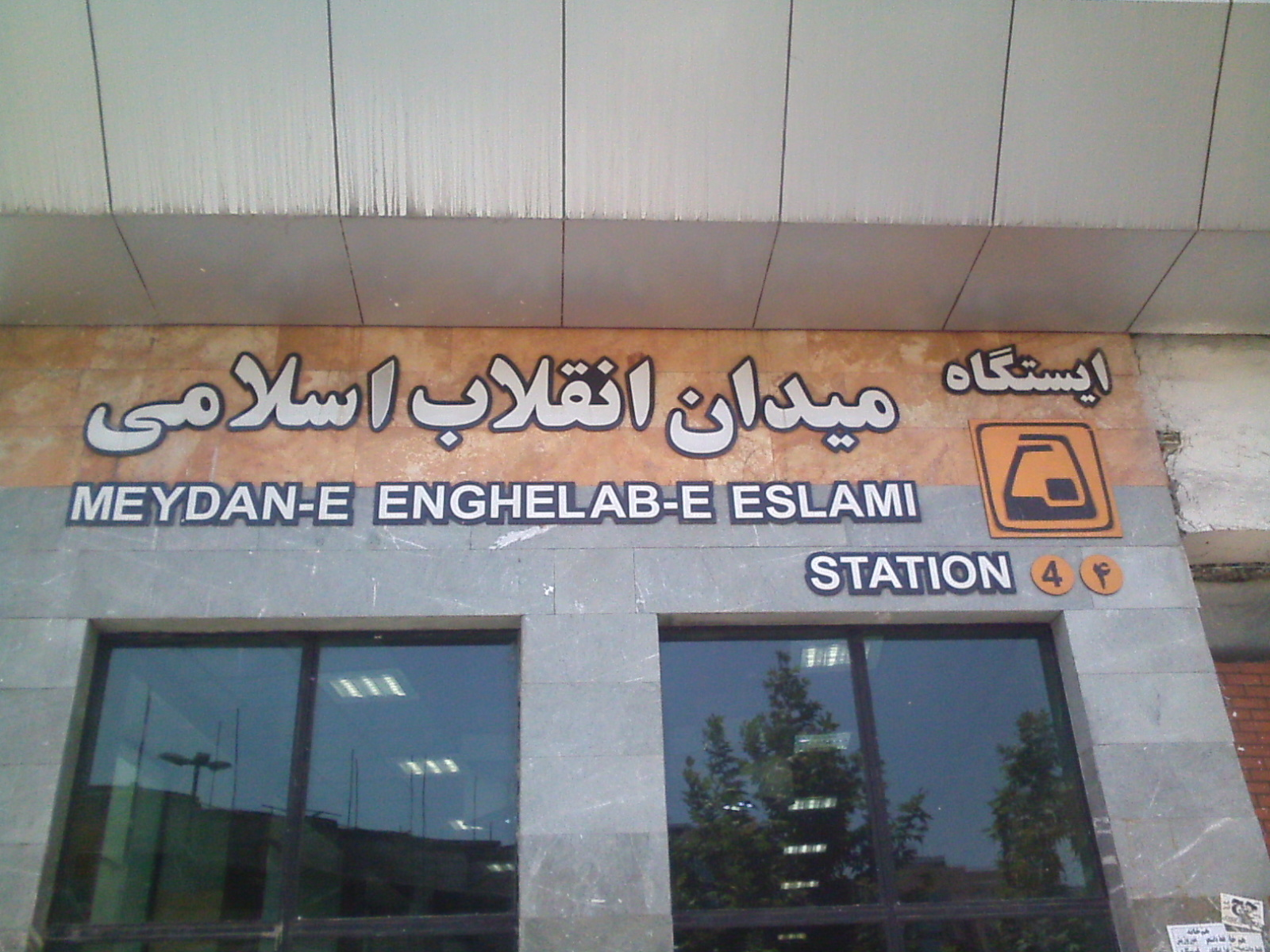

General information
- Location: Enqelab Square, Districts 6-11, Tehran; Tehran Province, Iran
- System: Tehran Metro Station
- Operator: Tehran Urban and Suburban Railways Organization (Metro)
- Platforms: Side Platform

History
- Opened: 1388 H-Kh (May 2009)

Services
Preceding station	Tehran Metro	Following station
Towhid towards Allameh Jafari	Line 4	Teatr-e Shahr towards Shahid Kolahdooz
Location

Enghelab Metro Station is a station of Tehran Metro Line 4. It is located in Enghelab Square, the junctions of Azadi Street, Enqelab Street and Kargar Street. It is between Teatr-e Shahr Metro Station and Tohid Metro Station.
