= Mehrabad Airport Terminal 1 and 2 station =

Station of the Tehran Metro

Mehrabad Airport Terminal 1 and 2 station ایستگاه مترو فرودگاه مهرآباد ترمینال ۱ و ۲
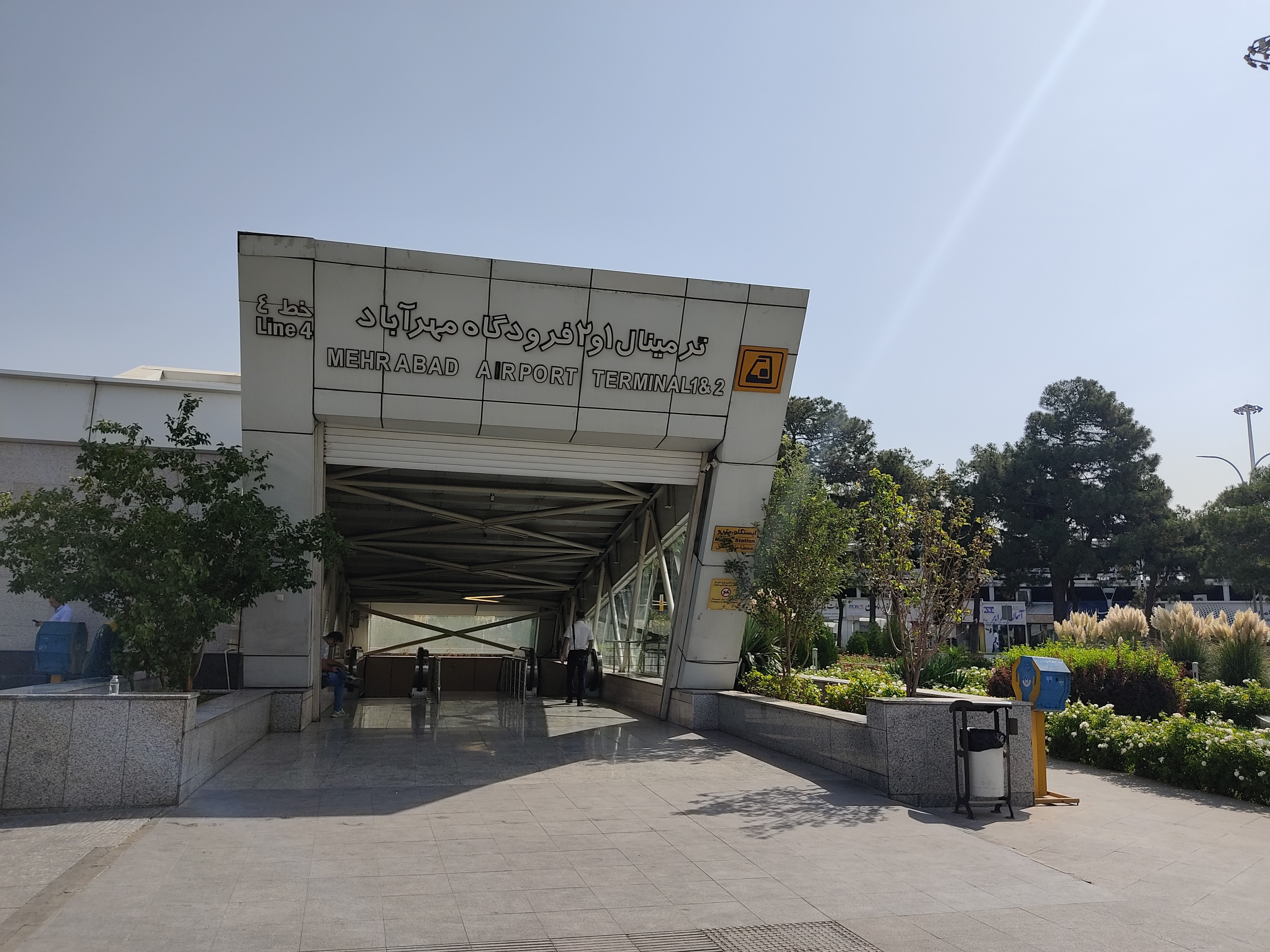

General information
- Location: Mehrabad Airport; District 9, Tehran, Tehran County; Tehran Province, Iran
- Coordinates: 35°41′28″N 51°19′29″E
- System: Tehran Metro station
- Operator: Tehran Urban and Suburban Railways Organization (Metro)

History
- Opened: 25 Esfand 1394 H-Sh (March 15, 2016)

Services
Preceding station	Tehran Metro	Following station
Mehrabad Airport Terminal4&6 towards Mehrabad Airport Terminal 4 & 6	Line 4	Bimeh Terminus
Location

Mehrabad Airport Terminal 1 and 2 station is a station in Tehran Metro Line 4's Mehrabad Branch, branching off from Bimeh Metro Station. It is located in Mehrabad Airport serving Terminals 1 and 2.

Terminals 1 and 2 have the following function:

- Terminal 1 is only used for departures of Kish Air and Zagros Airlines.
- Terminal 2 handles all flights of Iran Air, Iran Air Tours, Meraj Airlines, Qeshm Air and Ata Airlines and for arrivals of Kish Airlines and Zagros Airlines, but all the Jet bridges are only being used for Meraj Airlines. It also used for all cargo operations.

== Gallery ==
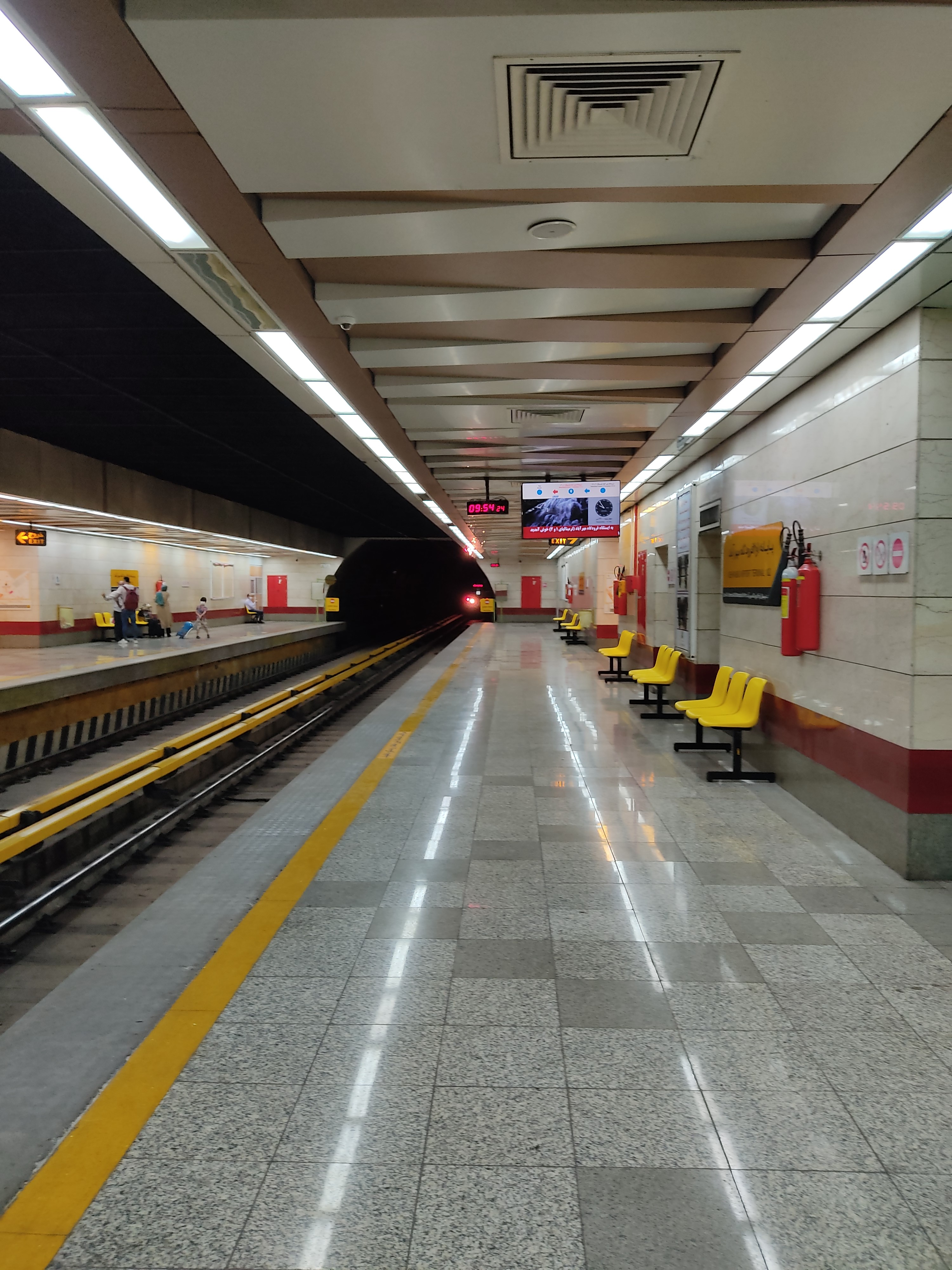

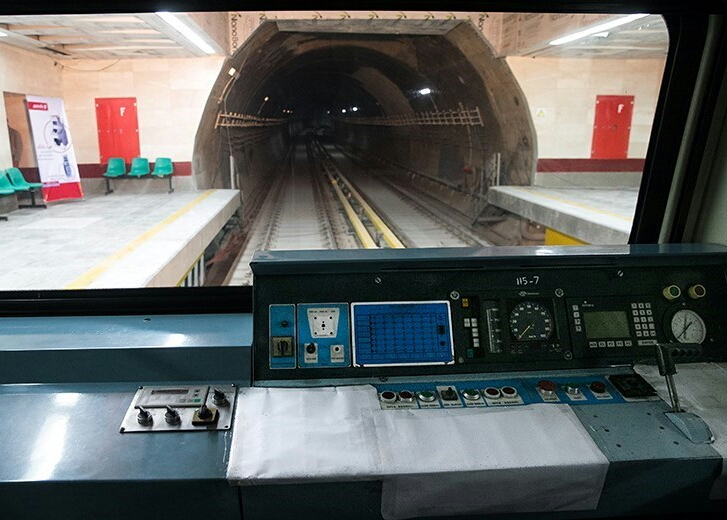
