= Tankman (disambiguation) =

Tank Man is a nickname given to an unidentified Chinese protester during the 1989 Tiananmen Square protests and massacre.

Tankman may also refer to:

- Calvin Tankman (born Christopher Heyward III; 1994), American professional wrestler
- Tankman (military), an operator of a military tank
- Tankman (series), webseries hosted on Newgrounds
- Tehran's Tank Man, nickname given to an unidentified Iranian protester during the 2025–2026 Iranian protests

== See also ==
- The Tank Man (disambiguation)
