= Towhid Metro Station =

Station of the Tehran Metro

Towhid Metro Station ایستگاه مترو توحید

General information
- Location: Tohid Street- Azadi Street, Districts 2-6-10-11, Tehran; Iran
- Coordinates: 35.7008°N 51.3785°E
- System: Tehran Metro Station
- Operator: Tehran Urban and Suburban Railways Organization (Metro)
- Platforms: Side Platform
- Connections: Tehran BRT: BRT 1; BRT 4

History
- Opened: 1389 H-Sh (2011)

Services
Preceding station	Tehran Metro	Following station
Shademan towards Allameh Jafari	Line 4	Meydan-e Enghelab-e Eslami towards Shahid Kolahdooz
Location

Towhid Metro Station is a station of Tehran Metro Line 4. It is located in Tohid Square on top of Tohid Tunnel. It is between Enghelab Metro Station and Shademan Metro Station (formerly known as Azadi Station). The station was opened on 7 February 2011. The station will also serve Line 7 when it opens.
