= Shahrak-e Ekbatan Metro Station =

Station of the Tehran Metro

Shahrak-e Shahid Arman Aliverdi Metro Station ایستگاه مترو شهرک شهید آرمان علی وردی
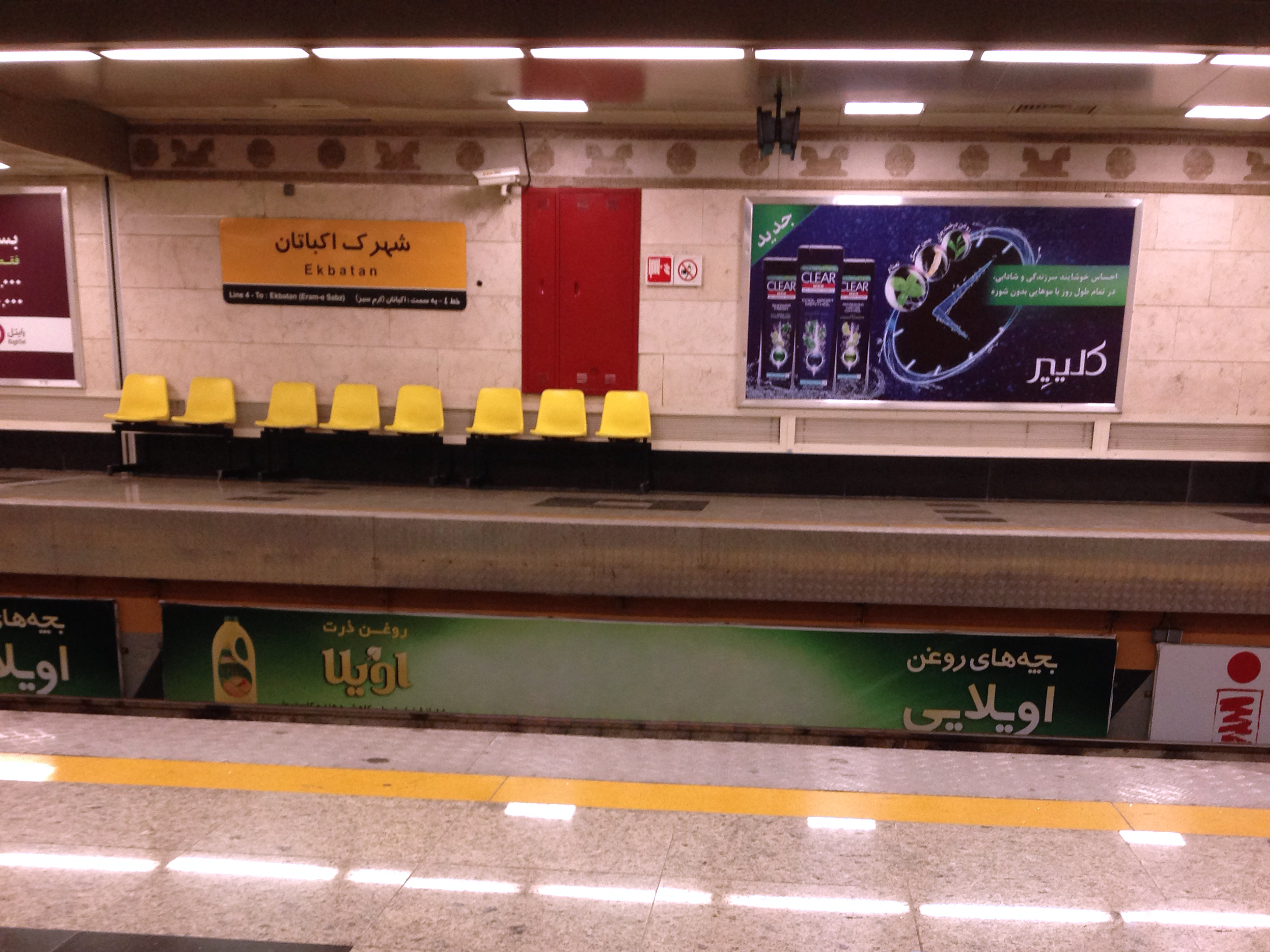

General information
- Location: Ekbatan, District 5, Tehran; Iran
- Coordinates: 35.7055°N 51.3072°E
- System: Tehran Metro Station
- Operator: Tehran Urban and Suburban Railways Organization (Metro)
- Platforms: Side Platform

History
- Opened: 2012

Services
Preceding station	Tehran Metro	Following station
Eram-e Sabz towards Allameh Jafari	Line 4	Bimeh towards Shahid Kolahdooz
Location
- Location within Tehran

Shahrak-e Shahid Arman Aliverdi Metro Station is a station of Tehran Metro Line 4. It is located in Shahrak-e Ekbatan. It is located between Bimeh Metro Station to the southeast and Eram-e Sabz Metro Station to the north.
