= Mehrabad Airport Terminal 4 and 6 station =

Station of the Tehran Metro

Mehrabad Airport Terminal 4 and 6 station ایستگاه مترو فرودگاه مهرآباد ترمینال ۴ و ۶
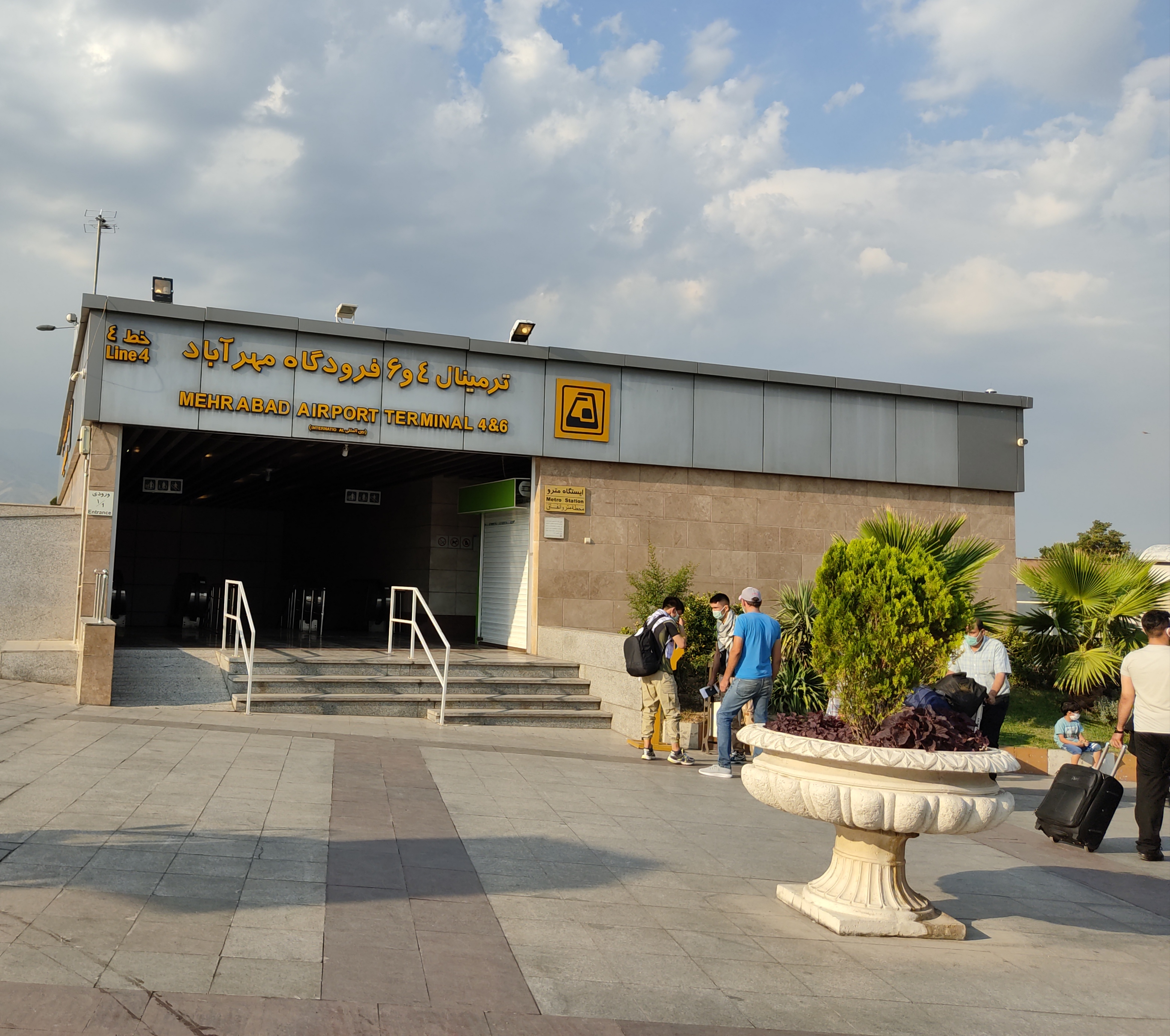

General information
- Location: Mehrabad Airport; District 9, Tehran, Tehran County; Tehran Province, Iran
- Coordinates: 35°41′17″N 51°19′54.5″E
- System: Tehran Metro station
- Operator: Tehran Urban and Suburban Railways Organization (Metro)

History
- Opened: 25 Esfand 1394 H-Sh (March 15, 2016)

Services
| Preceding station | Tehran Metro | Following station |
|---|---|---|
| Terminus | Line 4 | Mehrabad Airport Terminal1&2 towards Bimeh |
Location

Mehrabad Airport Terminal 4 and 6 station is a station in Tehran Metro Line 4's Mehrabad Branch, branching off from Bimeh Metro Station. It is located in Mehrabad Airport serving Terminal pairs 4 and 6.

Terminals 4 and 6 have the following function:

- Terminals 4 and 6 handle departures (Terminal 4) and arrivals (Terminal 6) for airlines other than Iran Air, Iran Air Tours, Meraj Airlines, Qeshm Air, Ata Airlines, Kish Air, Chabahar Airlines and Zagros Airlines.
