= The Tank Man =

The Tank Man may refer to:

- Tank Man, also known as the Unknown Rebel, the Chinese who stood in the path of a column of tanks following the Tiananmen Square protests of 1989
- The Tank Man, a documentary film about the above protests and part of the Frontline series
- The Tank Man (2004 film), a Finnish short documentary

== See also ==
- Tankman (disambiguation)
