= Cheraghi Expressway =

Expressway in Tehran, Iran

Cheraghi Expressway
- بزرگراه شهید چراغی
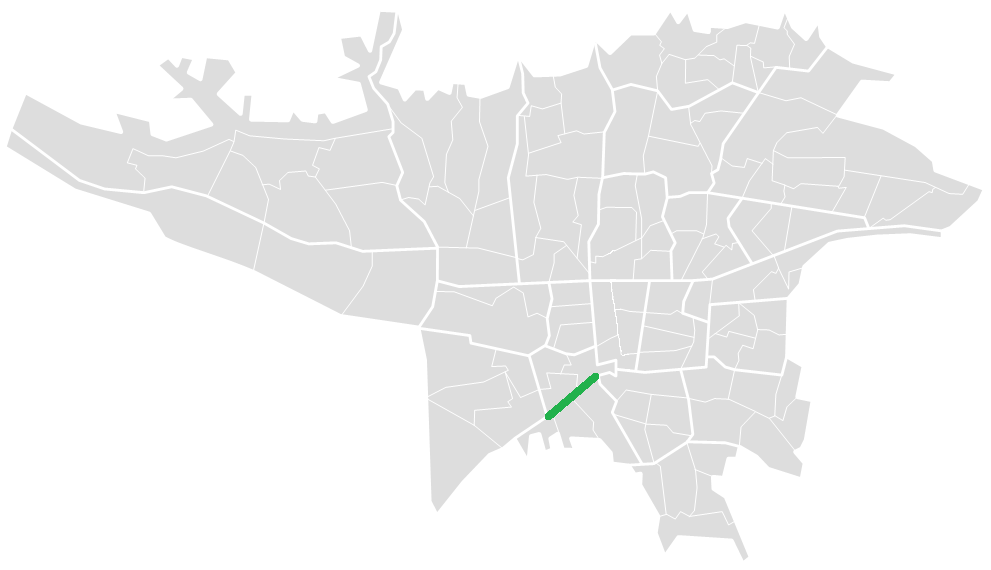

Route information
- Length: 3.5 km (2.2 mi)

Major junctions
- East end: Qale Morghi Expressway; Navvab Expressway
- West end: Kazemi Expressway; Saidi Expressway

Location
- Country: Iran
- Major cities: Tehran

Highway system
- Highways in Iran; Freeways

The Cheraghi Expressway (Persian: بزرگراه شهید چراغی) is a 3.5-kilometre (2.2 mi) expressway in southern Tehran, Iran. It serves as a key urban corridor, connecting the Navvab Expressway and Qale Morghi Expressway in the east to Kazemi Expressway and Saidi Expressway in the west. The expressway runs adjacent to Qale Morghi Airport and terminates at Zam-zam Square.

Originally known as Javaneh Expressway, it was renamed to Cheraghi Expressway in honour of Martyr Ayatollah Seyyed Ebrahim Raisi .Mehr News Agency

From East to West
	Qale Morghi Expressway; Navvab Expressway
	Qale Morghi Street
Zam-zam Square	Kazemi Expressway; Saidi Expressway
From West to East
