= Yarjani Expressway =

Expressway in Tehran, Iran

Yarjani Expressway

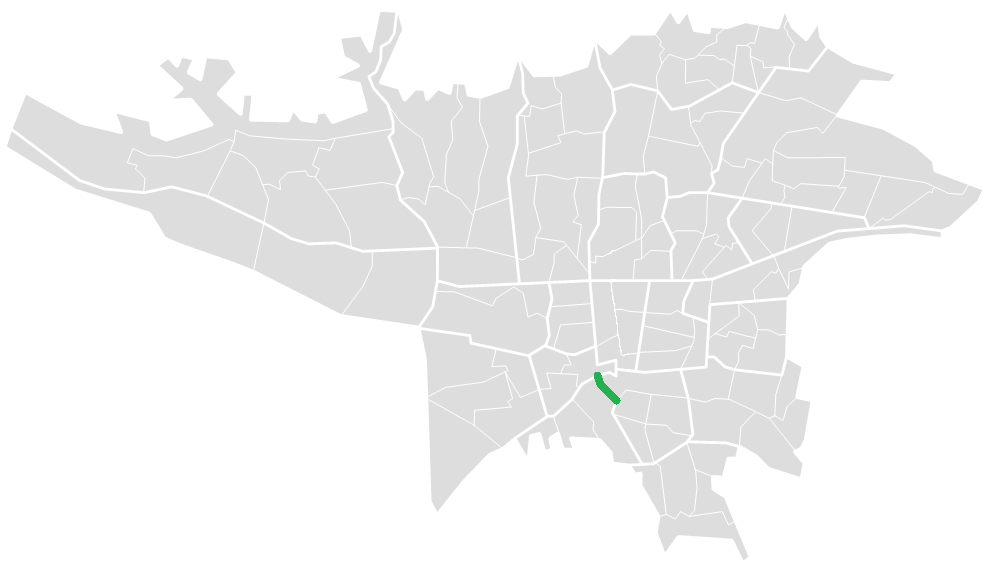

Route information
- Length: 1.75 km (1.09 mi)

Major junctions
- East end: Tondguyan Expressway
- West end: Navvab Expressway; Niruye Havaei Expressway

Location
- Country: Iran
- Major cities: Tehran

Highway system
- Highways in Iran; Freeways

Yarjani Expressway (formerly known as Qale Morghi Expressway) is an expressway in southern Tehran. It is from Southern end of Navvab Expressway to Tondguyan Expressway. It runs from northeastern Qale Morghi Military Air Base.

From East to West
| Tondguyan Expressway |
| Navvab Expressway; Niruye Havaei Expressway |
From West to East
