= Navvab Expressway =

Expressway in Tehran, Iran

Coordinates: 35.6672°N 51.3816°E

Navvab Safavi Expressway
- بزرگراه نوّاب صفوی
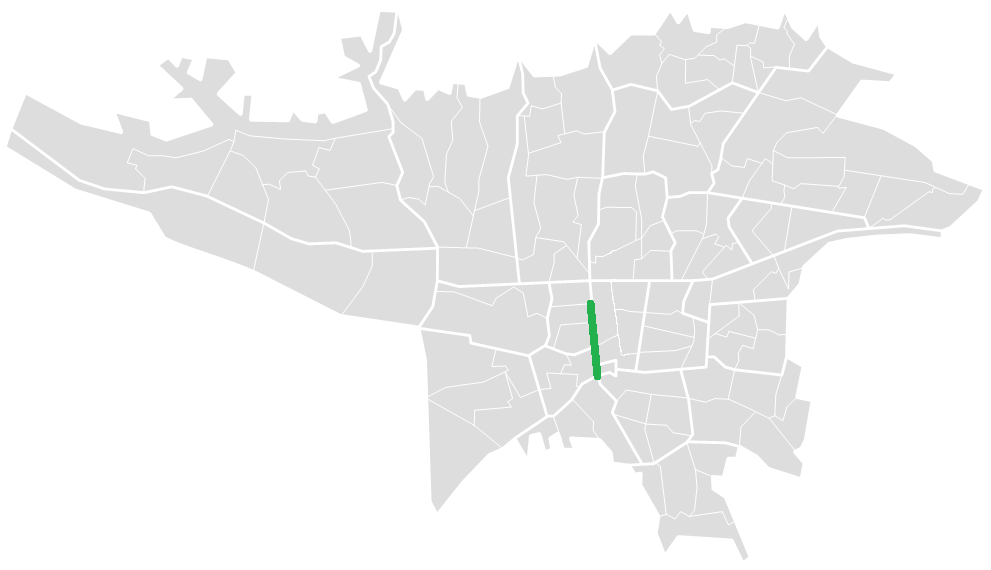

Route information
- Length: 5.5 km (3.4 mi)

Major junctions
- North end: Tohid Tunnel
- South end: Qale Morghi Expressway; Niruye Havaei Expressway

Location
- Country: Iran
- Major cities: Tehran

Highway system
- Highways in Iran; Freeways

Shahid Navvab Safavi Expressway starts from Tohid Tunnel and is Chamran Expressway renamed after passing the tunnel. It continues south until it reaches the junction between Qale Morghi Expressway and Niruye Havaei Expressway. It is named after Navvab Safavi.

From North to south
Jomhuri Square	Jomhuri Street
	Azarbayejan Street
	Tohid Tunnel
Navvab Metro Station
	Imam Khomeini Street
	Helal Ahmar Street
	Yadegar-e-Emam Expressway Expansion
	Qale Morghi Expressway; Niruye Havaei Expressway
From South to North
