= Tondguyan Expressway =

Road in Tehran, Iran

Shahid Tondguyan Expressway
- بزرگراه تندگویان
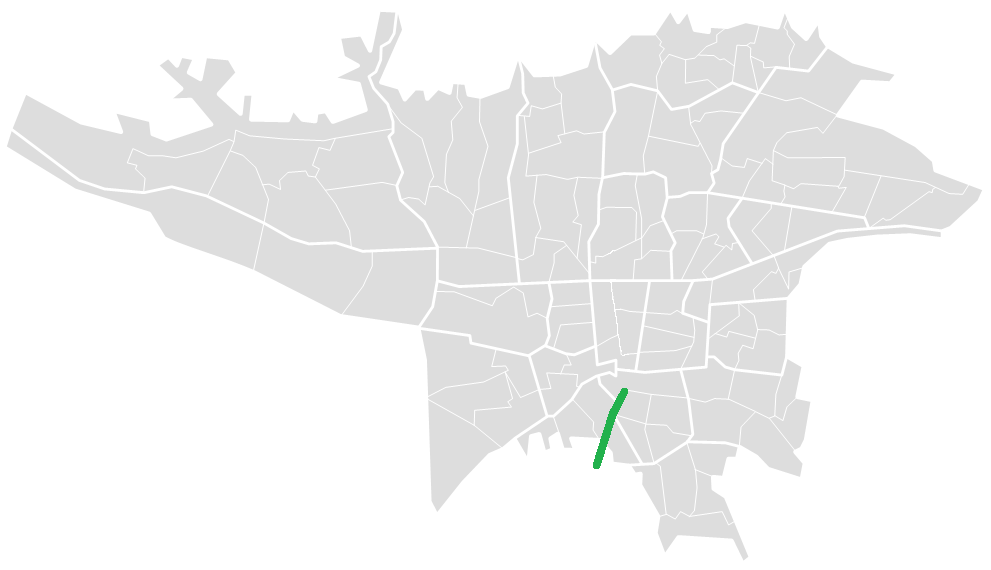

Route information
- Length: 3.5 km (2.2 mi)

Major junctions
- North end: Besat Square
- South end: Shahid Sanikhani Interchange; Behesht-e Zahra Expressway; Azadegan Expressway

Location
- Country: Iran
- Major cities: Tehran

Highway system
- Highways in Iran; Freeways

Tondguyan Expressway is an expressway in Tehran from Besat Square in southeastern corner of Tehran Railway Station to Azadegan Expressway and Behesht-e Zahra Expressway.

From East to West
Besat Square	Besat Expressway; Yadegar-e-Emam Expressway Southern Exteinsion
	Qale Morghi Expressway
	Shahid Latifi Street; Bahmanyar Street
	Shaqayeq Street
	Misaq Street
Shahid Sanikhani Interchange	Behesht-e Zahra Expressway; Azadegan Expressway
From West to East
