= Kargar Street =

Street in Tehran, Iran

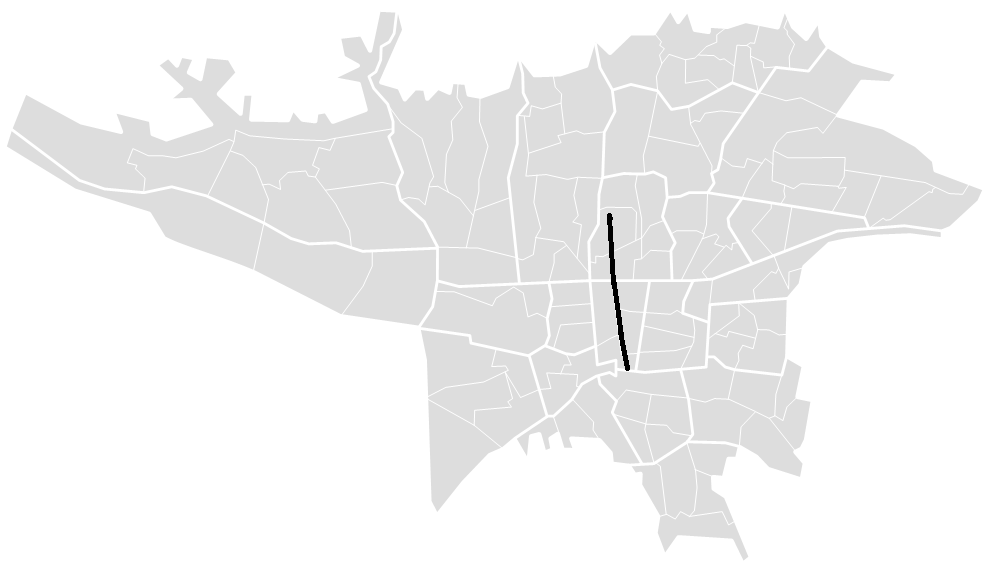
- Interactive map of Kargar Street
- Native name: خیابان کارگر (Persian)
- Length: 9.8 km (6.1 mi)
- Location: Tehran
- Coordinates: 35.725124°N 51.391598°W
- South end: Rahahan Square

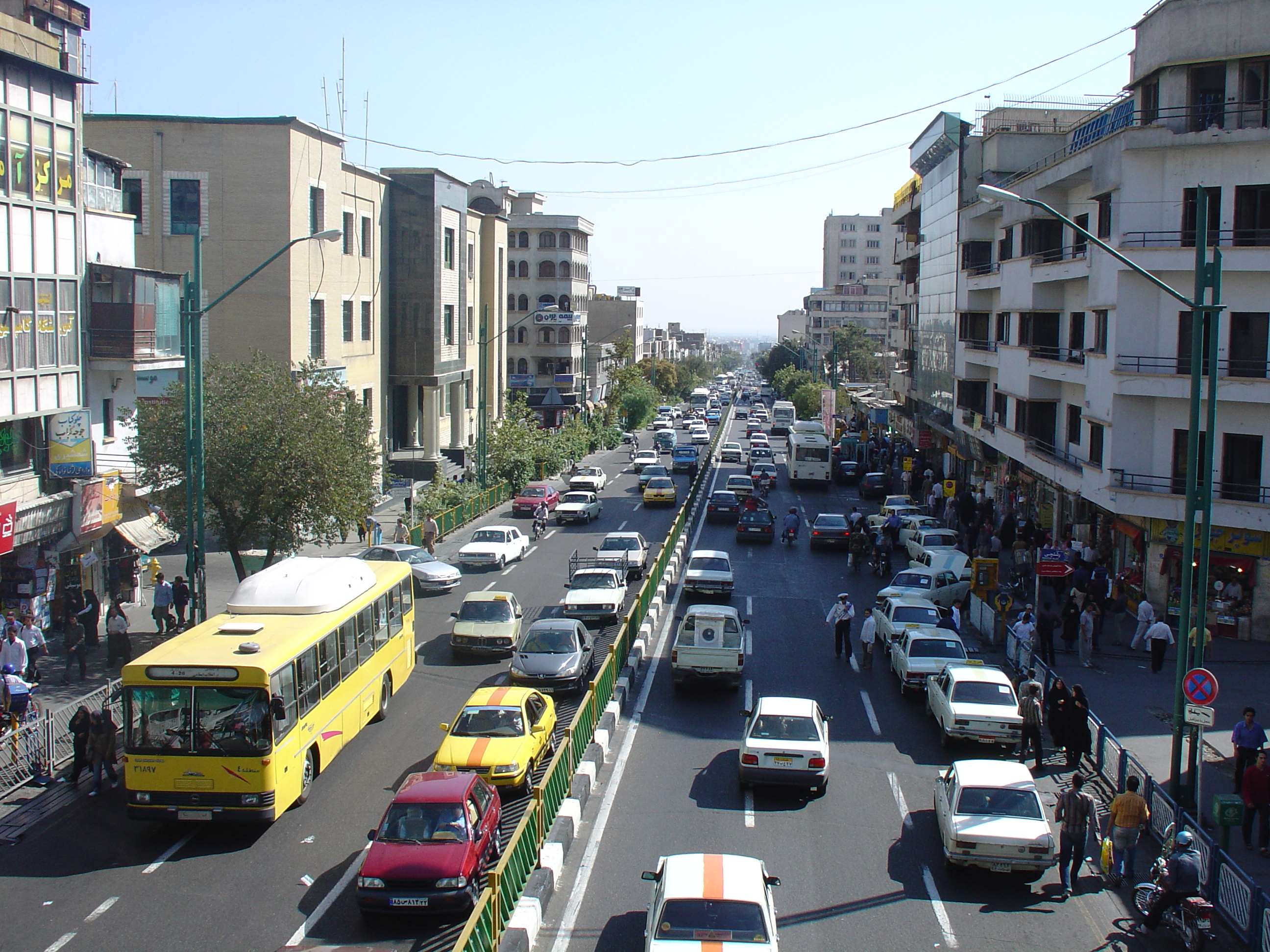
A view from Kargar Street

Kargar Street (Worker Street) is the main street of Amir Abad, and is one of the longest streets of Tehran. It extends from Southern Tehran's Rahahan Square to Northern Amir Abad.

From North to South
	Hakim Expressway
	Jalal-e-Ale Ahmad Expressway
	Fatemi Street
	Keshavarz Boulevard
	Nosrat Street
Enghelab Metro Station
Enqelab Square	Azadi Street; Enqelab Street
	Jomhuri Street
	Azarbaijan Street
Pastor Square	Pasteur Street
	Daneshgah Jang Street
Hor Square	Cyrus Street
	Kamali Street; Shahid Moayyeri Street
Qazvin Square	Qazvin Street
Razi Square	Helal Ahmar Street; Robat Karim Street
	Behdari Street
Rahahan Square	Shush Street; Valiasr Street; Tehran Railway Station
From South to North
