= Rah Ahan Square =

Square in Tehran, Iran

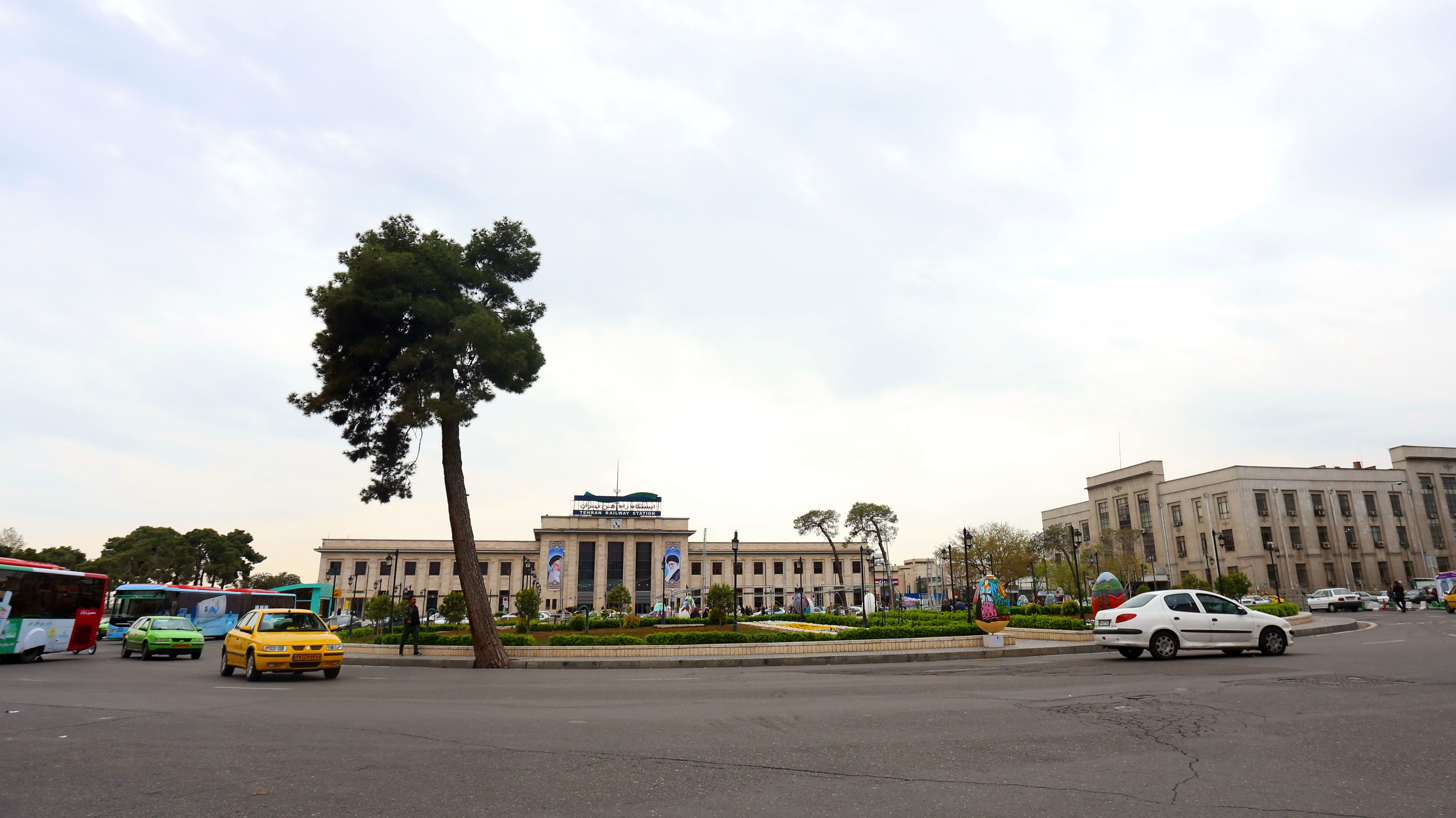
- Interactive map of Rah Ahan Square
- Location: Tehran, Iran

Rah Ahan Square (Persian: میدان راه‌آهن, lit. 'Railway Square') is a square located in southern Tehran, Iran. Tehran Railway Station is located at this square.

== Transportation ==
- Valiasr Street
- Kargar Street
- Shush Street
- Tehran railway station
- Rahahan Metro Station

=== Former ===
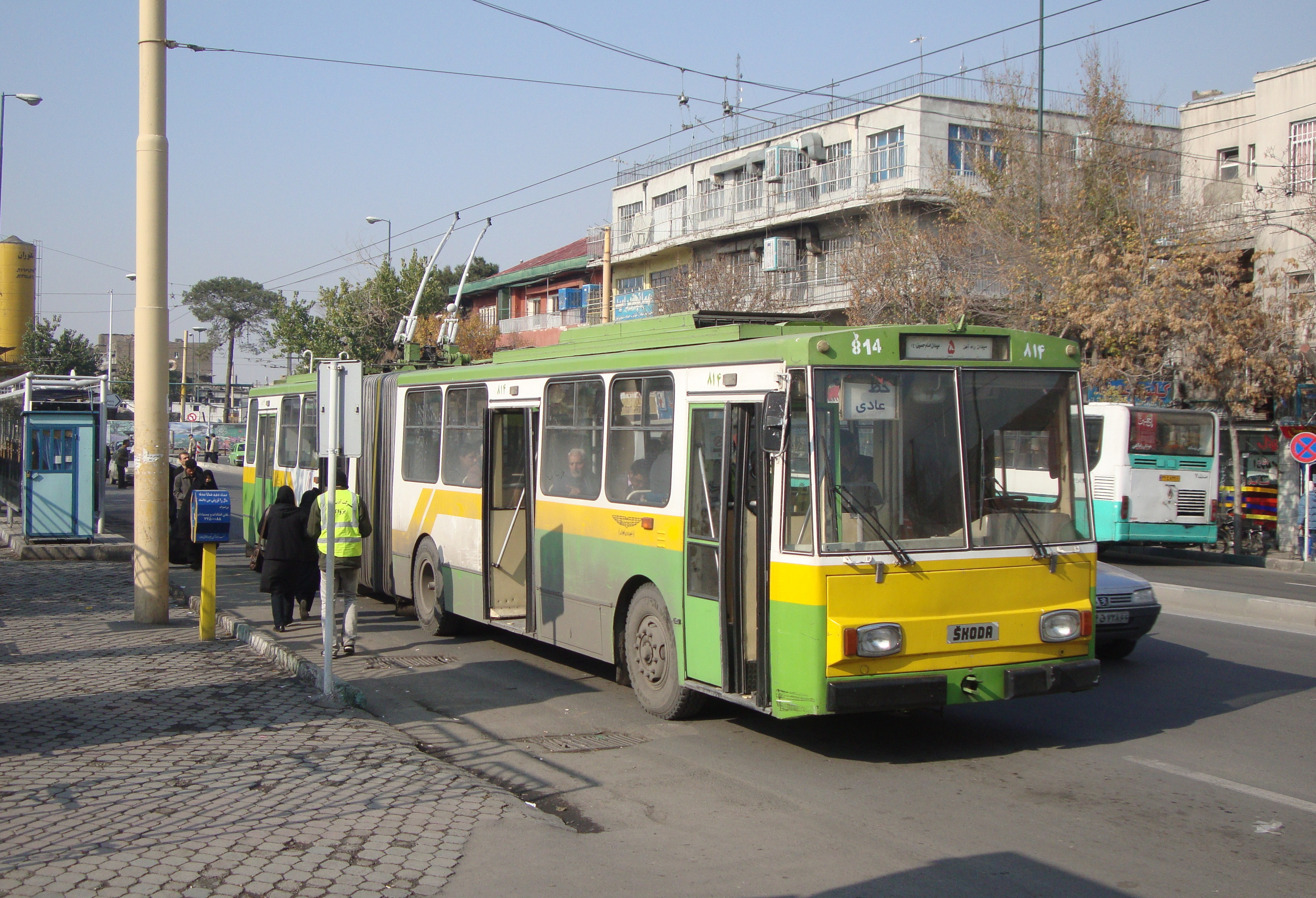
A trolleybus at Rahahan Square in 2011

The Tehran trolleybus system's route 5 served Rah Ahan Square starting in 2010, but the service was withdrawn at an unknown date between 2011 and 2013.

== See also ==
- Khorasan Square
- Toopkhaneh Square
- Khavaran
- Gomrok
- Gheytarieh
