= Khorasan Square =

Square in Tehran, Iran

Khorasan Square

Khorasan Square (Persian: میدان خراسان) is a square in the southeast of Tehran that reaches from the north side to 17th Shahrivar Street and finally to Imam Hossein Square and from the south side to Besat Highway. Khorasan Square is mainly referred to the neighborhoods around it.

== History ==
In the distant past, Khorasan Square was one of the gates of Tehran and one of the old neighborhoods of the capital.

== See also ==
- Toopkhaneh Square
- Rah Ahan Square
- Khavaran
- Gomrok
- Gheytarieh
