= Enqelab Square =

Square in Tehran, Iran

Coordinates: 35°42′04″N 51°23′28″E

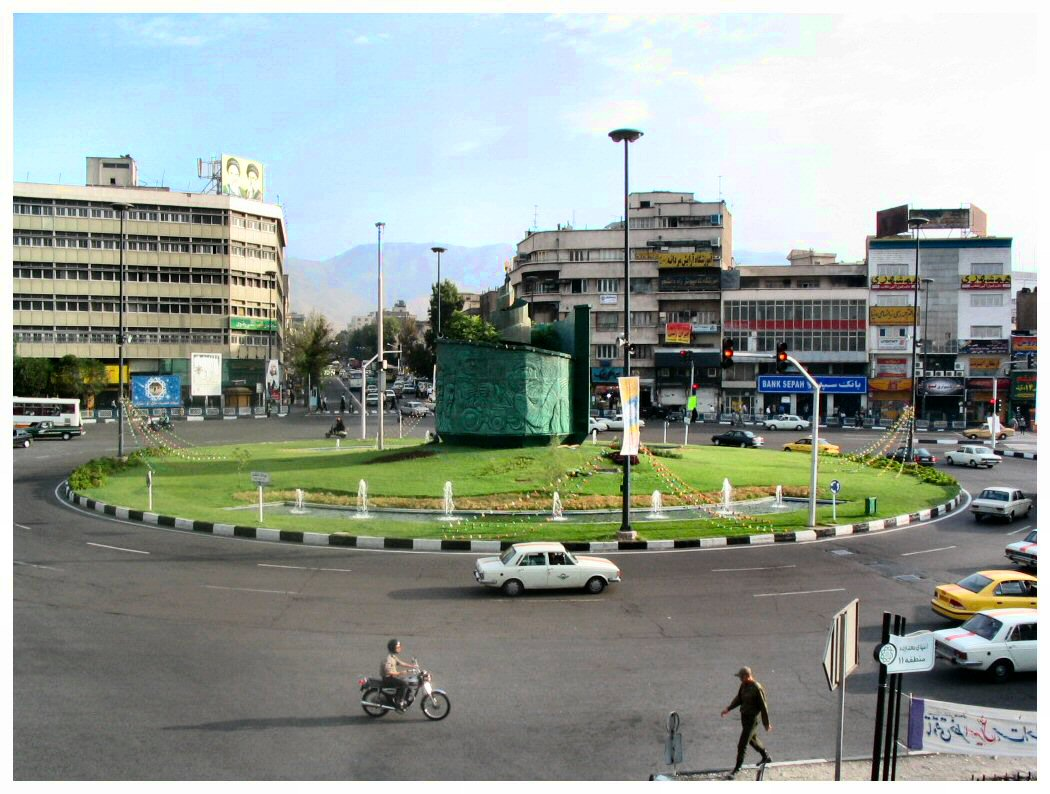
Enqelab Square in 2006

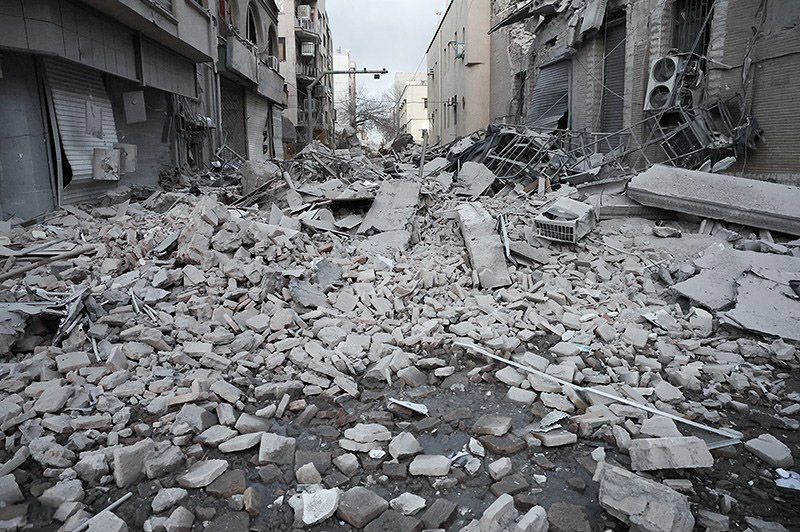
Enqelab Square after the attack on 3 March 2026

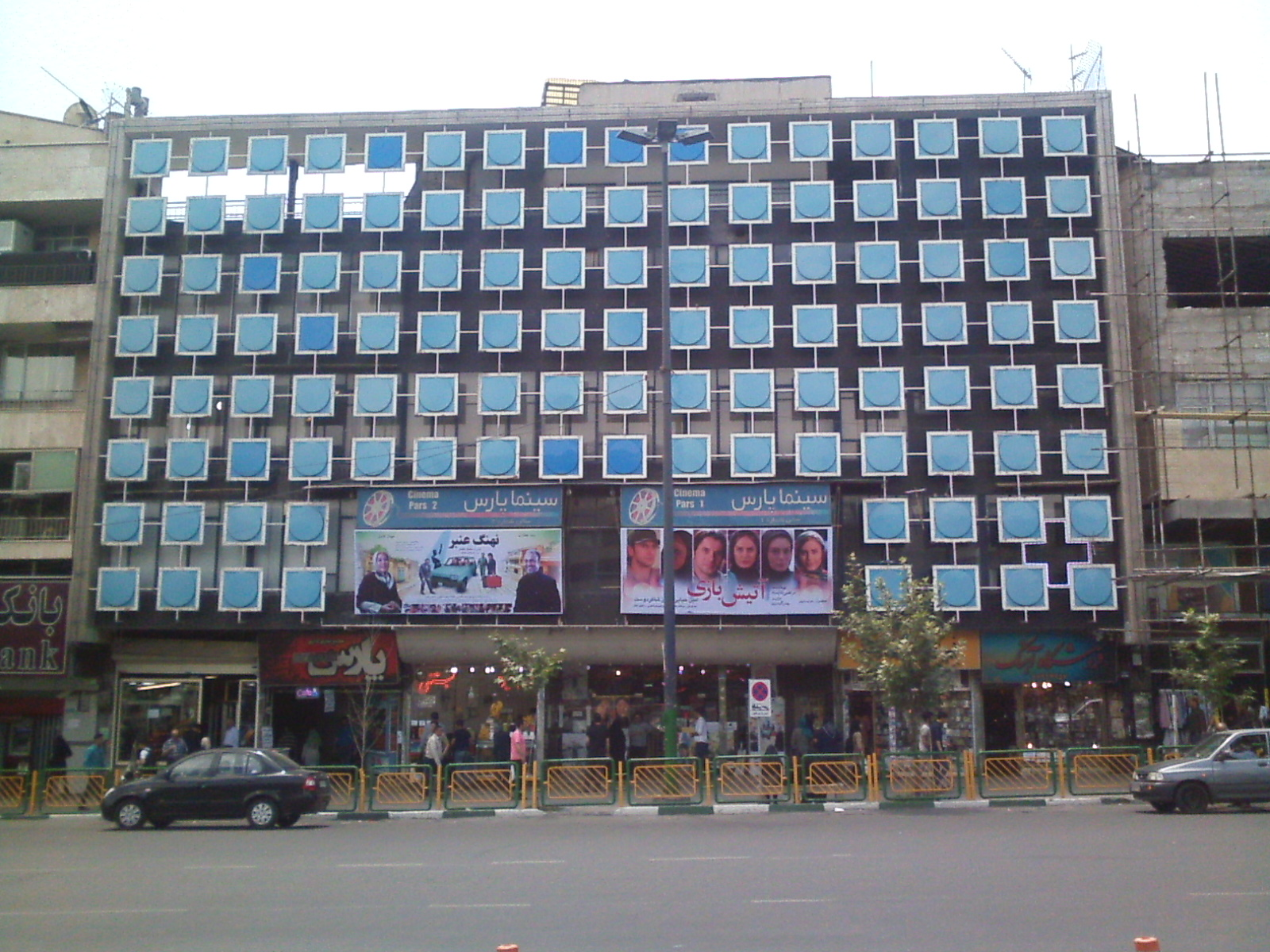
A cinema in the square in 2015

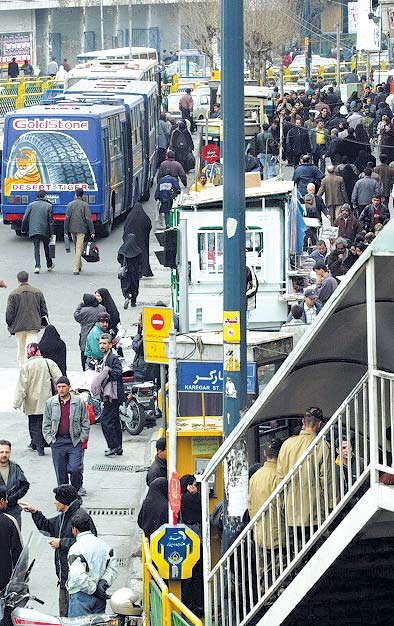
People in the square in 2002

Enqelab Square (Persian: میدان انقلاب اسلامی, romanized: Meydân-e Enqelâb-e Eslâmi, lit. 'Islamic Revolution Square') is a square in central Tehran, Iran. It is served by a Metro station of the same name. It sits at the western end of Enqelab Street.

In January 2026, Iranian authorities installed a mural on a billboard at Enqelab Square warning the United States against attempting a military strike. On 12 January 2026, thousands of pro-regime demonstrators gathered in Enqelab Square for the “Iranian uprising against American-Zionist terrorism” rally.

Enqelab Square was the site of pro-regime demonstrations following the 2026 Assassination of Ali Khamenei. On 3 March 2026, US and Israeli forces attacked Enqelab Square and the area with fighter jets. A week and a day later, on 11 March, thousands of Iranians rallied in the square in memory of the late Ayatollah Ali Khamenei, Armed forces chief of staff Abdolrahim Mousavi, Revolutionary Guards chief Mohammad Pakpour, defense minister Aziz Nasirzadeh, and Secretary of the Supreme National Security Council Ali Shamkhani.

== Transportation ==
- Azadi Street
- Enqelab Street
- Kargar Street
- Tehran BRT Line Enqelab square Station
- Enghelab Metro Station
