= Bimeh Metro Station =

Station of the Tehran Metro

Bimeh Metro Station ایستگاه مترو بیمه
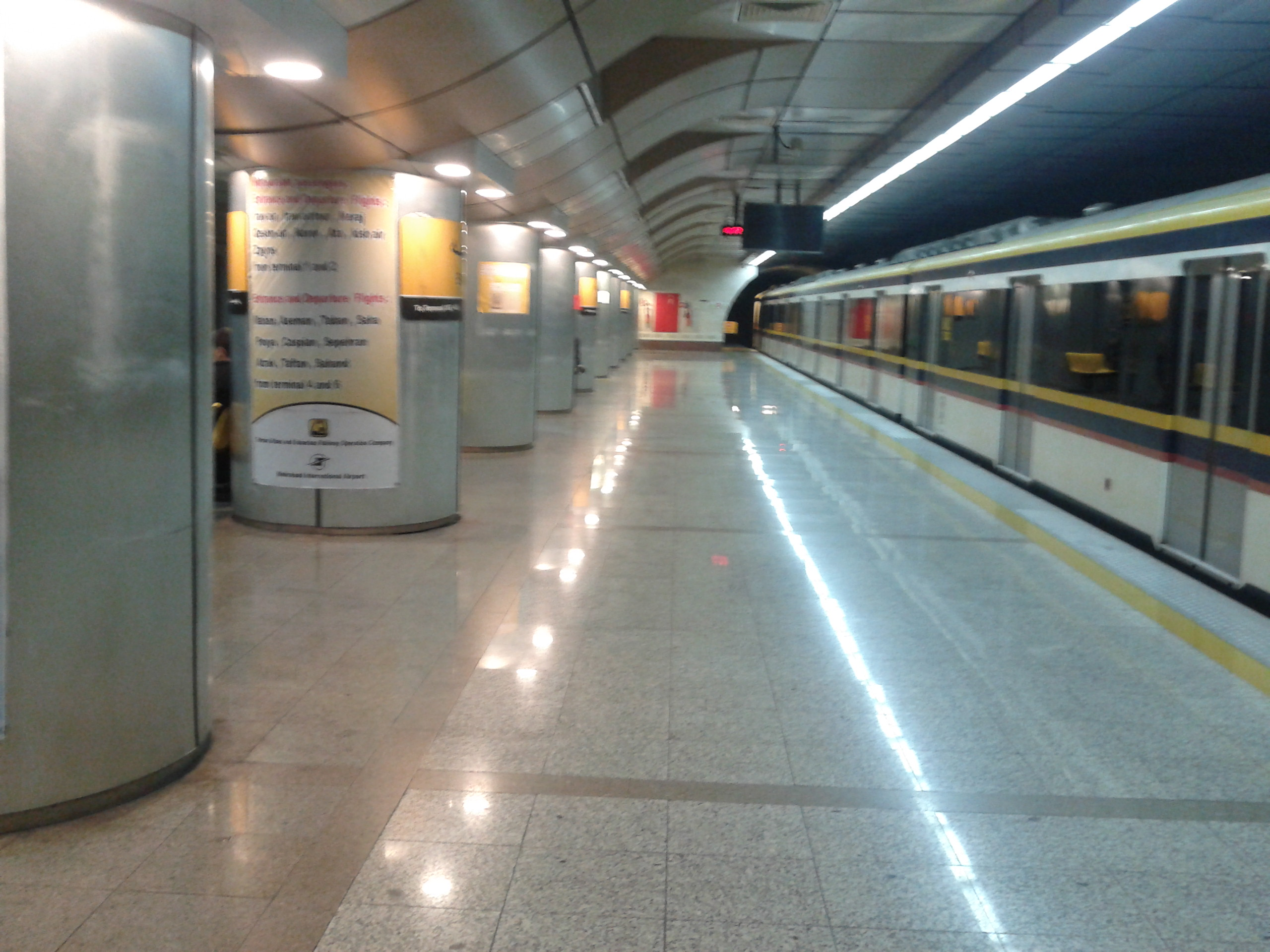

General information
- Location: Lashgari Expressway; Districts 5-9, Tehran, Tehran County; Tehran Province, Iran
- Coordinates: 35°41′58″N 51°19′14″E
- System: Tehran Metro Station
- Operator: Tehran Urban and Suburban Railways Organization (Metro)

History
- Opened: 25 Esfand 1394 H-Kh (March 15, 2016)

Services
Preceding station	Tehran Metro	Following station
Shahrak-e Ekbatan towards Allameh Jafari	Line 4	Meydan-e Azadi towards Shahid Kolahdooz
Mehrabad Airport Terminal 1 & 2 towards Mehrabad Airport Terminal 4 & 6	Line 4	Terminus
Location

Bimeh Metro Station is a station in Tehran Metro Line 4. It is located on Lashgari Expressway next to Shahrak-e Bimeh. It is between Meydan-e Azadi Metro Station and Shahrak-e Ekbatan Metro Station. It is also the terminus of the Mehrabad Airport branch of the line, having a special distinct fleet of trains running along it.
