= Jomhuri Eslami Street =

Street in Tehran, Iran

Jomhuri-ye Eslami Street خیابان جمهوری اسلامی
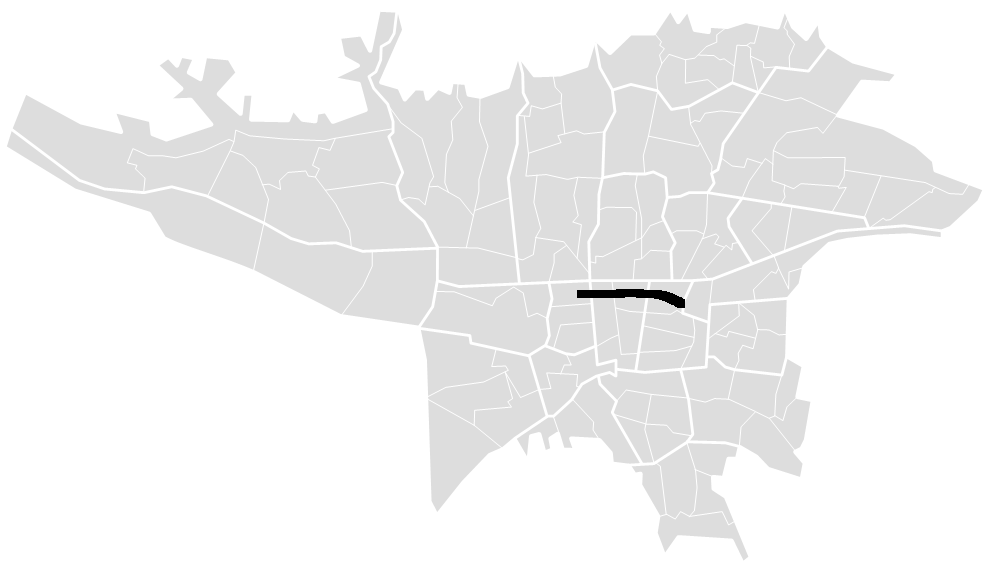
- Length: 5.2 km (3.2 mi)
- Location: Tehran
- East end: Baharestan Square
- West end: Roudaki Street

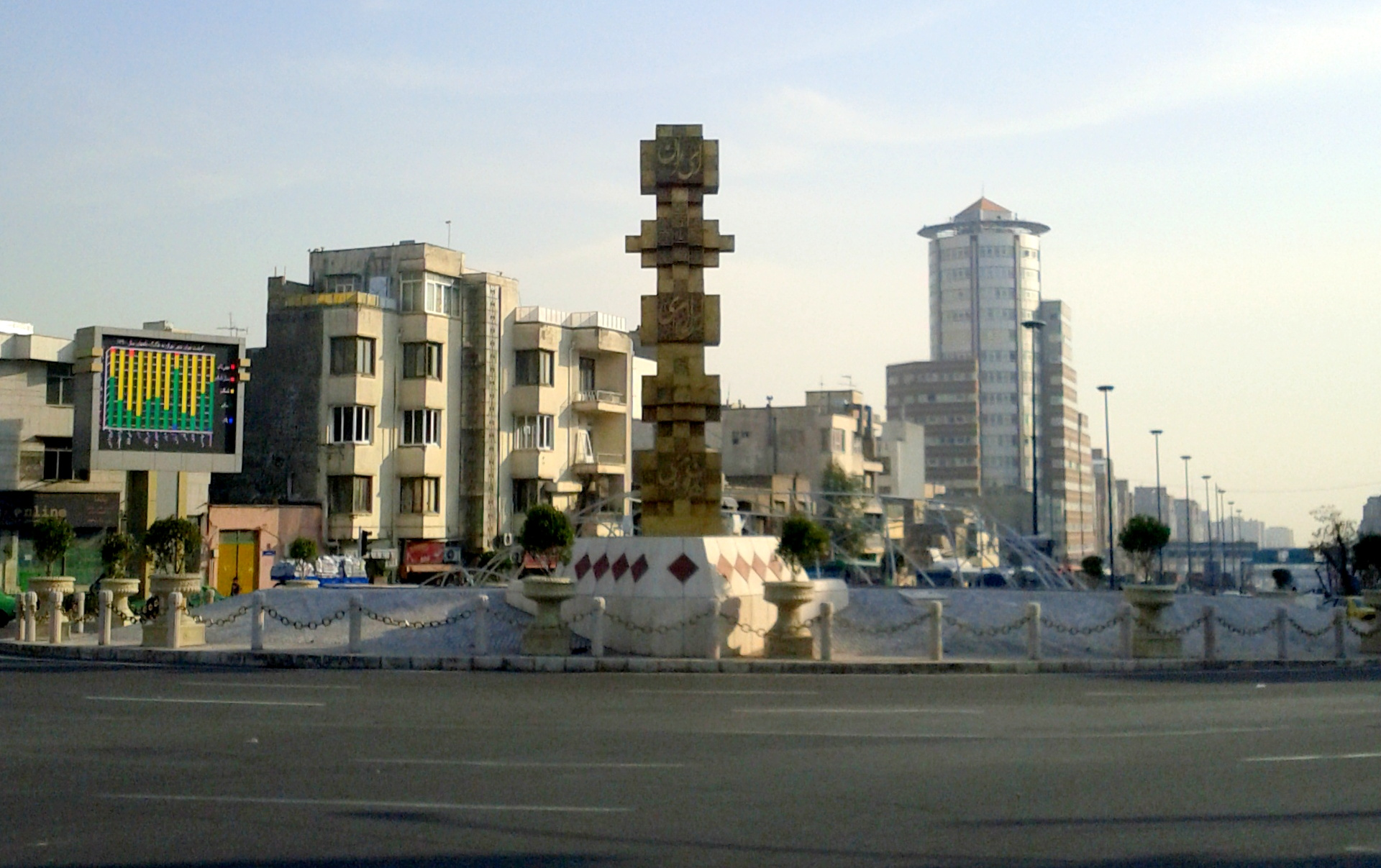
Jomhouri Square

Jomhuri Avenue is a street in the centre of Tehran, Iran. It has shops for the purchase of electronic equipment. Jomhuri is officially known as Jomhuri Islami Avenue which means Islamic republic. It is home to Tehran's biggest mobile phone shopping centre, Alaeddin (known as Bazaar-e Alaeddin). It is also a place where Tehran youngsters hang out during the evening.

Before the 1979 Iranian Revolution, the avenue's name was Shah (King).

The initial protests of the 2025–2026 Iranian protests extended to Jomhuri Street. A video and photo of an unidentified protester went viral, who defiantly sat in the middle of the Jomhuri at Tehran and refused to move for motorbike security forces, but later was beaten and forced to leave. The protester became known as Tehran's Tank Man, a reference to the Tank Man during the 1989 Tiananmen Square protests and massacre.

From East to West
Baharestan Square	Mostafa Khomeini Street; Ekbatan Street
Mokhberoddowleh	Saadi Street
	Lalezar Street
	Fredowsi Street
	Hafez Street
	Valiasr Street
	Felestin Street
	Abureyhan Street; Keshvardust Street
	Daneshgah Street
	Fakhre Razi Street
	12 Farvardin Street
	Ordibehesht Street
	Kargar Street
	Jamalzadeh Street
	Nowfallah Street; Piruz Street
	Kaveh Street
	Golshan Street
	Bastan Street
	Eskandari Street
Jomhuri Square	Tohid Street; Navvab Expressway
	Roudaki Street
From West to East
