= Enqelab Street =

Street in Tehran, Iran

Coordinates: 35°42′6.78″N 51°26′0.07″E

Enqelab Street / Reza Shah Street
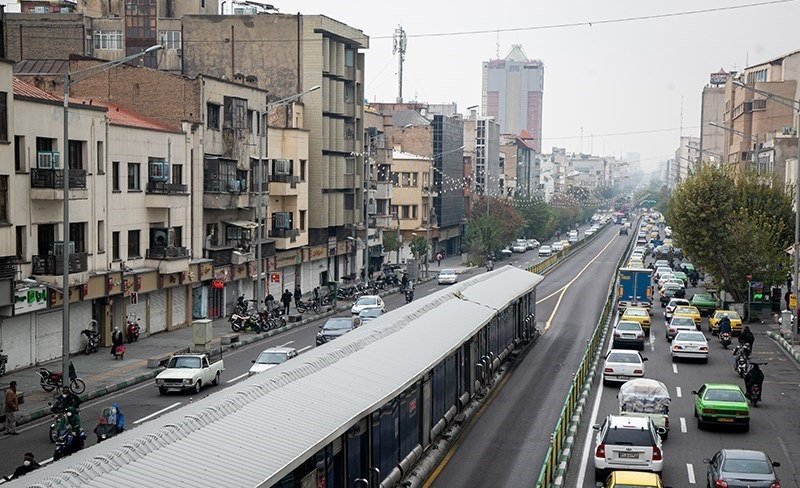
- Interactive map of Enqelab Street / Reza Shah Street
- Native name: خیابان رضا شاه (Persian)
- Length: 5 km (3.1 mi)
- East end: Imam Hossein Square
- West end: Enqelab Square

Enqelab Street (Persian: خیابان انقلاب اسلامی; also spelled Enghelab) is a major trunk route in Tehran, Iran connecting Enqelab square to Imam Hossein Square.

The full name that labels the street is Enqelab-e Eslami (Islamic Revolution Street) in honour of the 1979 Iranian Revolution. Its former but still used name is Reza Shah Street after Reza Shah, the founder of the Pahlavi dynasty.

From East to West
Continues as Damavand Street
Imam Hossein Square	17 Shahrivar Street; Mazandaran Street
Tehran BRT Line Imam Hossein Square Station
	Ayatollah Madani Street
	Namju Street
	Sepah Street
Tehran BRT Line Pole Chubi Square Station
Tehran BRT Line Shariati Square Station
Rowshandelan Overpass	Bahar Street; Shariati Street; Rowshandelan Street
Darvaze Dowlat Metro Station
Darvaze Dowlat Crossroad	Dr. Mofatteh Street; Saadi Street
Tehran BRT Line Laleh Zare Now Square Station
	Laleh Zar-e Now Street
Ferdowsi Metro Station
Ferdowsi Square	Ferdowsi Street; Qarani Street
Tehran BRT Line Ferdowsi Square Station
Kalej Overpass	Hafez Street
Valiasr Intersection Metro Station
Valiasr Crossroad	Valiasr Street
Tehran BRT Line Valiasr Crossroad Station
	Felestin Street
	Vesal Shirazi Street
Tehran BRT Line Tehran University Station
	Qods Street
	16 Azar Street; 12 Farvardin Street
Tehran BRT Line Enqelab Square Station
Enghelab Metro Station
Enqelab Square	Kargar Street
Continues as Azadi Street
From West to East

== See also ==
- Girls of Enghelab Street
- Enqelab Square
