= Tehran's Tank Man =

Unidentified Iranian protester

Tehran's Tank Man, also known as Iran's Tank Man or the Iranian Tank Man, was an unidentified Iranian protester who, on 29 December 2025, sat defiantly in the middle of Jomhuri Eslami Street (also known as Jomhuri Avenue) in central Tehran, refusing to move as a line of security forces on motorcycles advanced toward demonstrators during the 2025–2026 Iranian protests.

== Protest ==
The incident occurred amid widespread protests sparked by the severe depreciation of the Iranian rial to record lows against the US dollar, high inflation, and economic hardships. Viral videos and images showed the lone protester sitting cross-legged, drawing his jacket over his head to cover his face, blocking the path of riot police and Basij paramilitaries on motorcycles near the mobile phone shopping center on Jomhuri Avenue.

The footage quickly spread on social media and was widely compared by international media to the iconic Tank Man from the 1989 Tiananmen Square protests and massacre in Beijing, China, symbolizing non-violent individual defiance against state repression.

== Repression ==
Security forces assaulted the protester and forcibly removed him from the scene.

In May 2026, Masoud Payahoo, the videographer, was sentenced to 10 years of imprisonment, for allegedly having cooperated with Israel, and the sentence was confirmed by the Supreme Court of Iran. Payahoo's lawyer stated that Payahoo had only distributed the video to a few friends without intending it become public.

== Impact ==
During the following days, the image inspired similar acts of defiance in other protests, such as in Mashhad, and amplified calls for regime change on social media.

== See also ==
- 2025 Iran internal crisis
- May 2025 Iranian protests
