= Azadi Avenue (Tehran) =

Street in Tehran, Iran

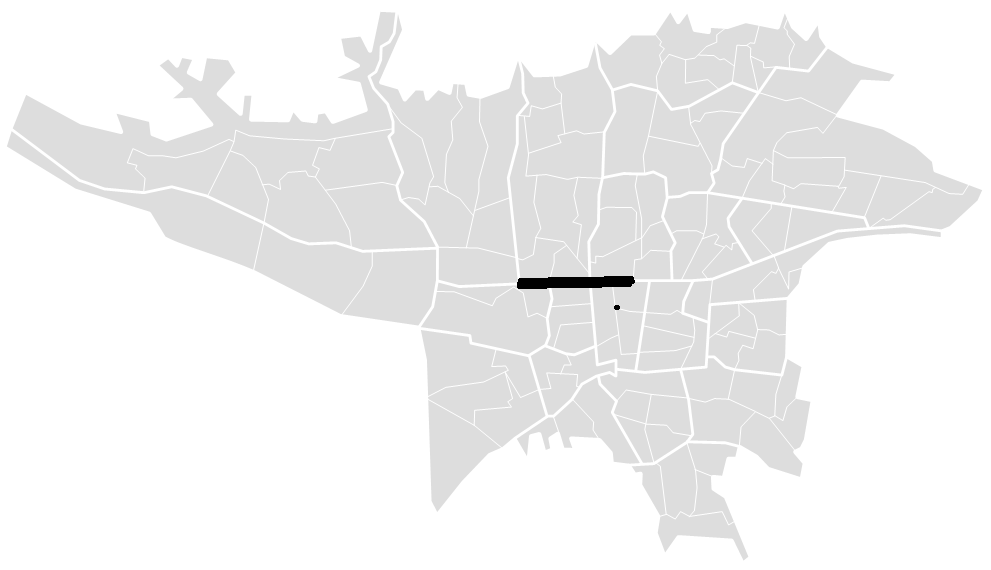
- Interactive map of Azadi Avenue
- Native name: خیابان آیزنهاور (Persian)
- Length: 4.5 km (2.8 mi)
- Location: Tehran
- East end: Azadi Square
- West end: Enqelab Square

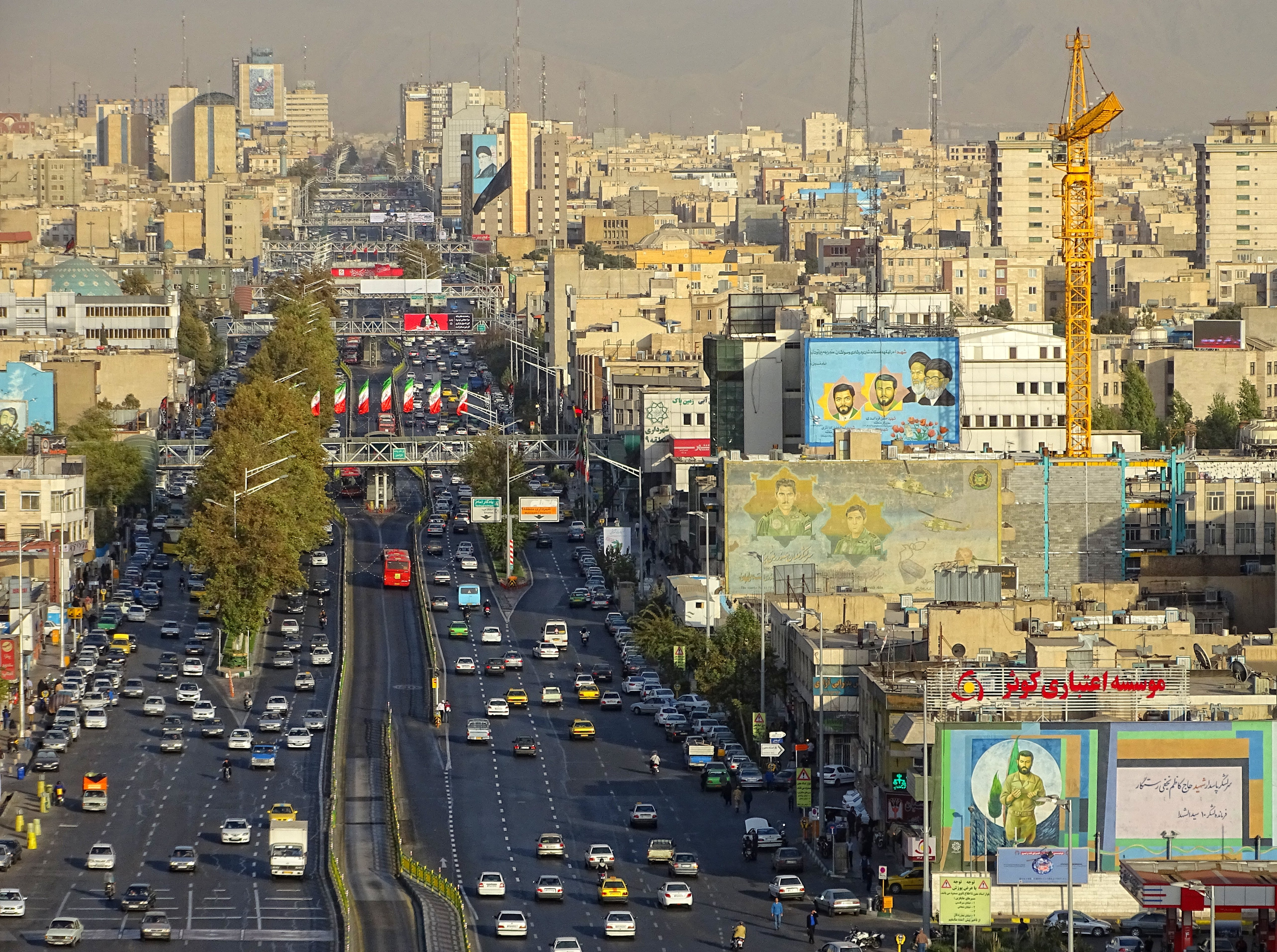
Azadi Avenue seen from the top of Azadi Tower, facing east.

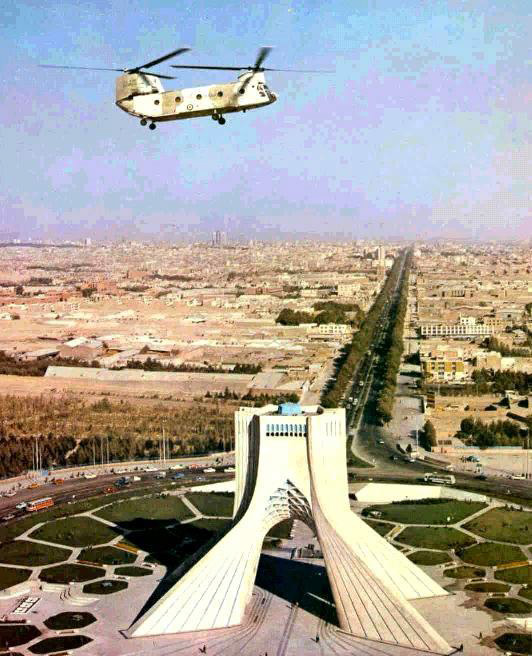
Azadi Avenue from above, 1970s

Azadi Avenue or Azadi Street (Persian: خیابان آزادی, romanized: Khiābān-e Azādi) is a 4.5 kilometers trunk route in Tehran, Iran, connecting Azadi Square to Enqelab Square.

The avenue's name means "Freedom" in Persian. Prior to the 1979 Iranian Revolution, the avenue was called Eisenhower avenue after the United States President Dwight D. Eisenhower. The avenue became an iconic place for demonstrations and gatherings during the 1979 Revolution. Thereafter, in the Islamic republic era, it became a meeting point for national gatherings and marches such as the 22 Bahman Rallies that are annually held in Tehran.

== Sites ==
Several Iranian state and non-state buildings, universities are located alongside Azadi avenue. Among them are:

- Ministry of Cooperatives, Labour, and Social Welfare
- Ministry of Cultural Heritage, Tourism and Handicrafts
- Hajj and Pilgrimage Organization
- Social Security Organization
- Iran's National Elites Foundation
- Sharif University of Technology
- Iran Technical and Vocational Training Organization
- Soureh International University

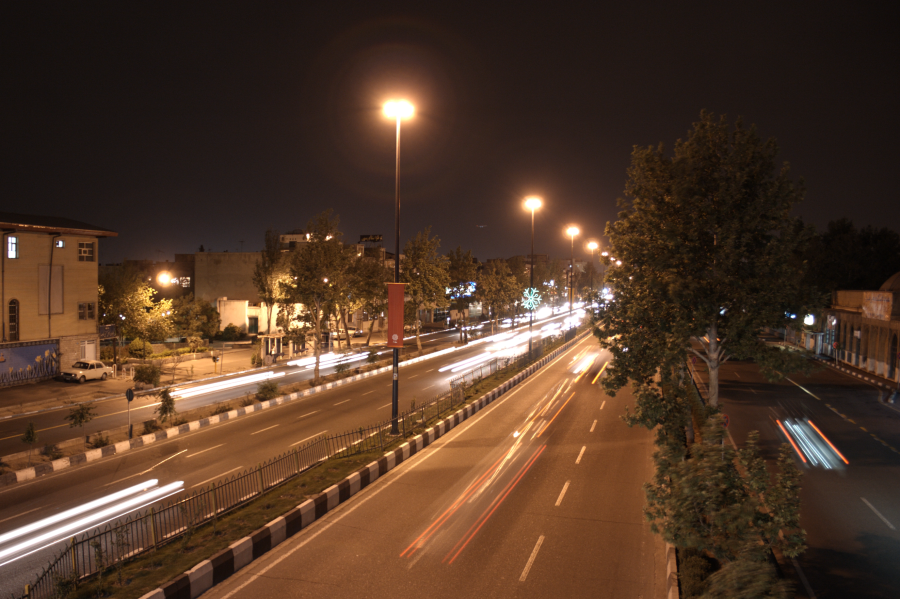
Azadi Avenue at night, 2006

From East to West
Continues as Enqelab Street
Enqelab Square	Kargar Street
Enghelab Metro Station
	Jamalzade Street
Tehran BRT Line Qarib Station
	Qarib Street
	Eskandari Street
Tohid Metro Station
	Tohid Tunnel Local Route
Tehran BRT Line Rudaki Station
	Rudaki Street
Tehran BRT Line Behbudi Station
	Azarbaijan Street; Behbudi Street; Sohravard Street
Eisenhower Metro Station
	Shadmehr Street; Jeyhun Street
	Yadegar-e-Emam Expressway
Doctor Habib-o-llah Metro Station
Tehran BRT Line Sharif University Station
Tehran BRT Line Ostad Moin Station
	Javad Akbari Street; Jey Street; Ostad Moin Street
Ostad Moein Metro Station
Tehran BRT Line Eisenhower Square Station
Azadi Square	Saidi Expressway; Jenah Expressway; Makhsus Karaj Expressway
From West to East
