= Eram-e Sabz Metro Station =

Station of the Tehran Metro

Eram-e Sabz Metro Station ایستگاه مترو ارم سبز
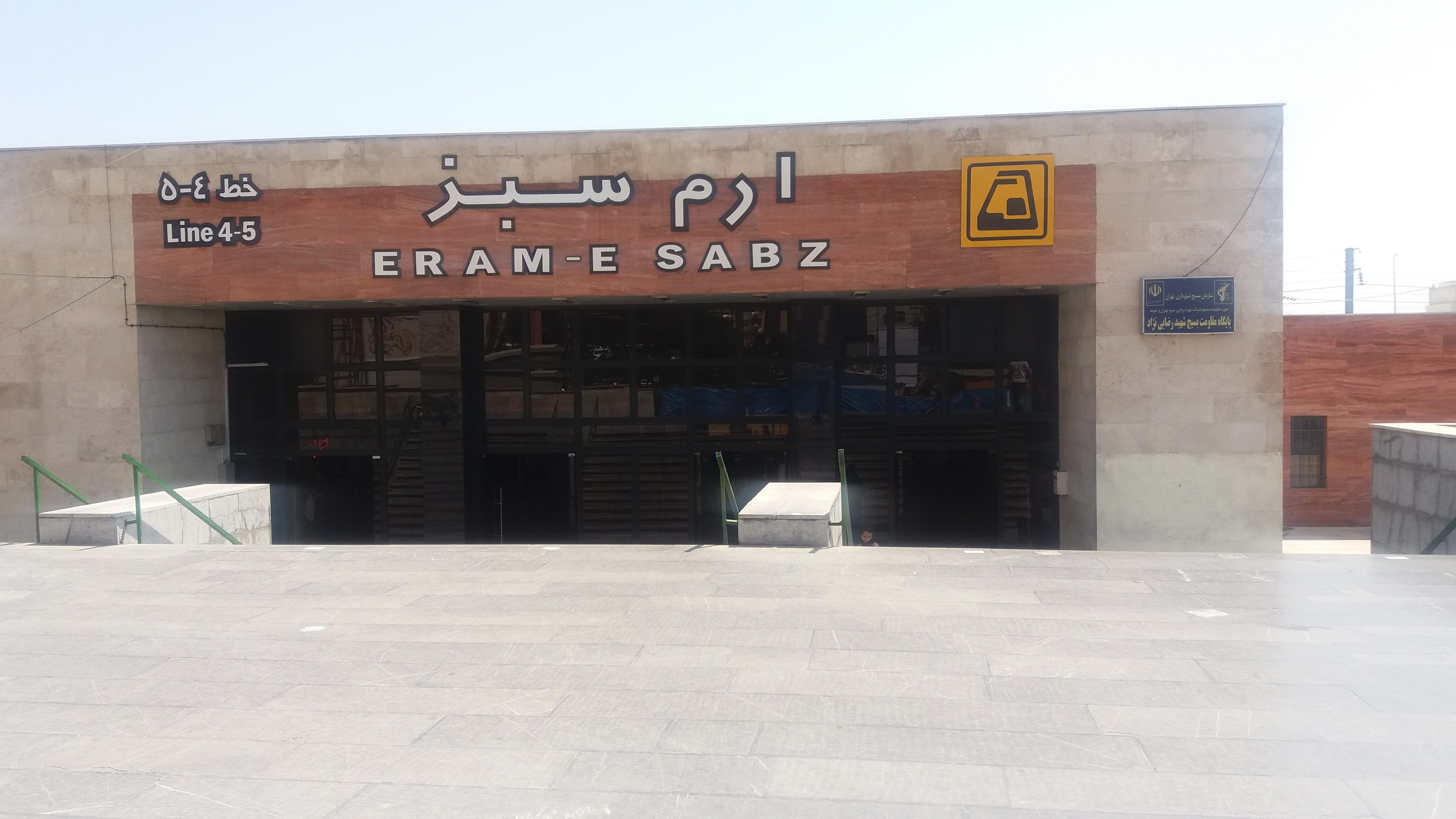

General information
- Location: Shaghayegh Blvd, District 5, Tehran; Tehran Province, Iran
- Coordinates: 35.7176°N 51.3020°E
- System: Tehran Metro Station
- Operator: Tehran Urban and Suburban Railways Organization (Metro)
- Platforms: 2 Cross platform interchange
- Tracks: 4
- Connections: Tehran Buses: 233 Eram-e Sabz Metro-Jannatabad; 296 Eram-e Sabz Metro-Kuhsar Terminal; 421 Eram-e Sabz Metro-Shahran

Construction
- Structure type: Surface
- Platform levels: 1
- Parking: Yes

History
- Opened: 2007; 2012

Services
Preceding station	Tehran Metro	Following station
Allameh Jafari Terminus	Line 4	Shahrak-e Ekbatan towards Shahid Kolahdooz
Varzeshgah-e Azadi towards Hashtgerd	Line 5	Tehran (Sadeghiyeh) Terminus
Location

Eram-e Sabz Metro Station is a station in Tehran Metro Line 4 and Line 5. It is located north of Tehran-Karaj Freeway and Ekbatan. It is the western terminus of Line 4, next to Shahrak-e Ekbatan Metro Station and it is between Azadi Stadium Metro Station and Sadeghieh (Tehran) Metro Station on Line 5. The station was formerly called Ekbatan (Eram-e Sabz), however the Ekbatan part of the name was dropped in July 2015, in order to avoid confusion with the nearby Shahrak-e Ekbatan Metro Station, as part of the city council's consideration of polling of the public opinions.
