= Ferdowsi Square =

Coordinates: 35°42′06″N 51°25′09″E

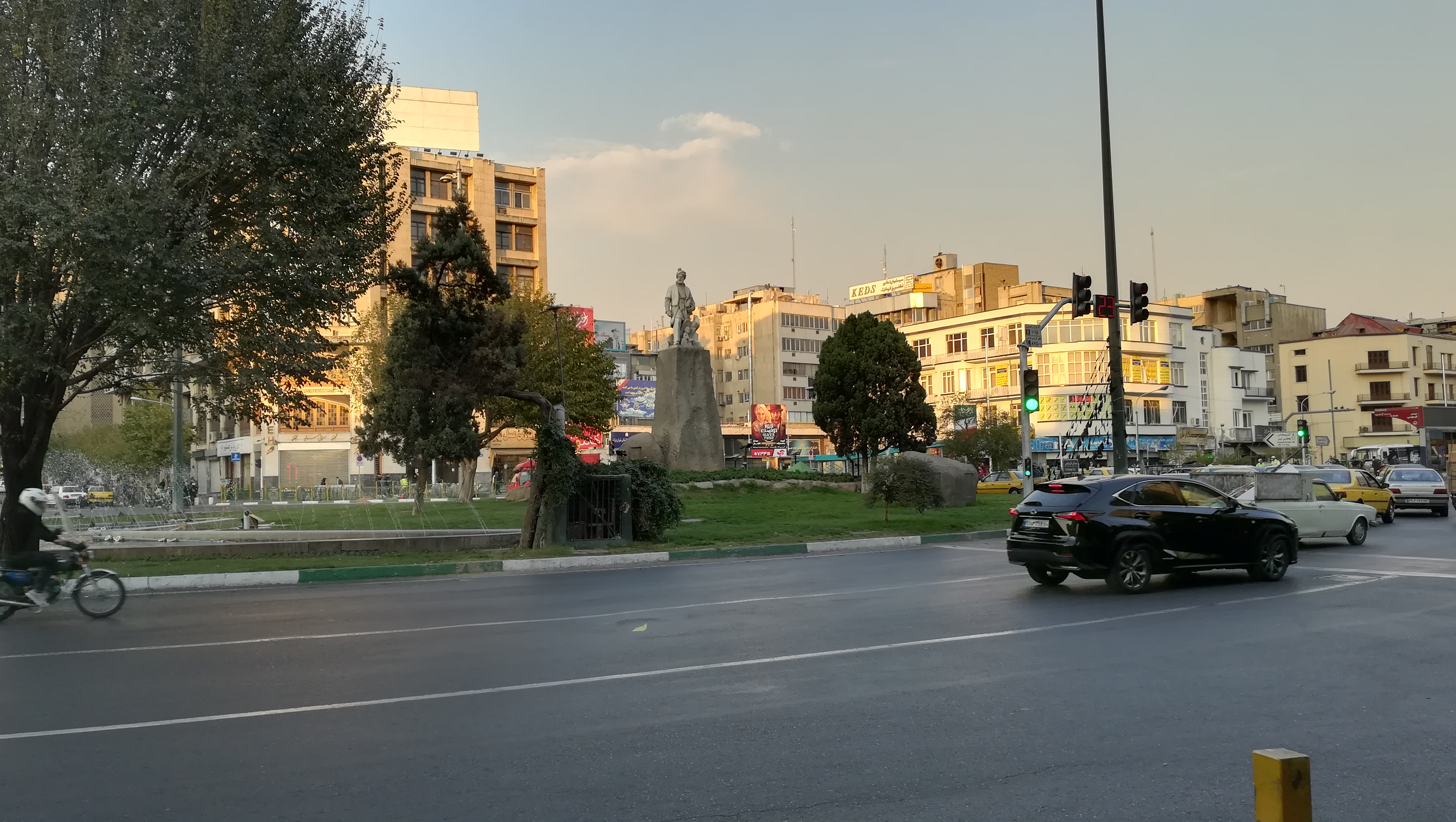
Ferdowsi Square in 2017

Ferdowsi Square (Persian: میدان فردوسی) is a public square in Tehran, Iran. It was named in honor of the 11th-century Persian poet Ferdowsi, and there is his statue designed by Iranian sculptor Abolhassan Sadighi on the square.

In the context of the 2026 Iran war, it was the site of an explosion on Quds Day, March 13, 2026, killing one woman among thousands of rally participants.

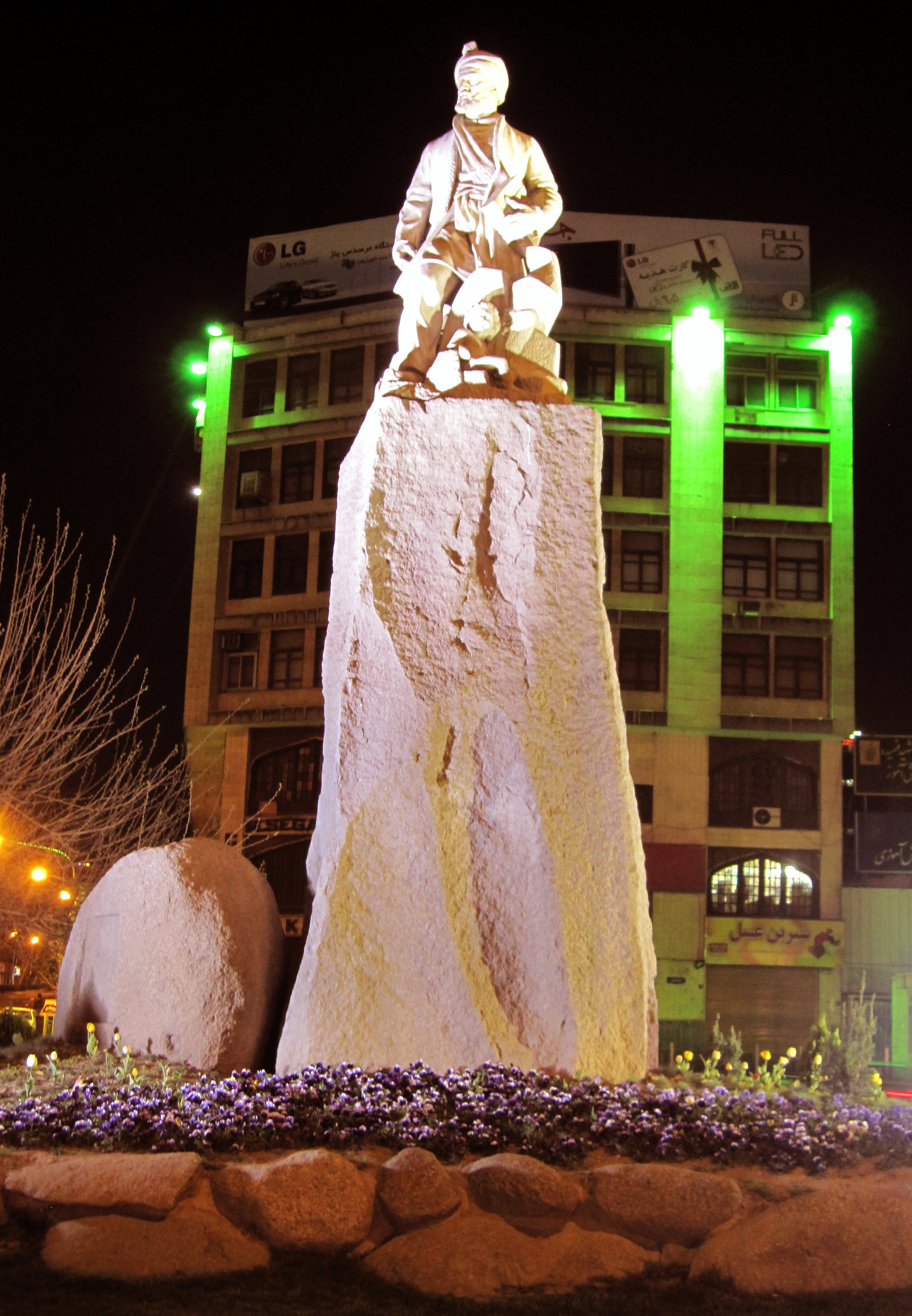
Statue of Ferdowsi

== See also ==
- Ferdowsi Metro Station
