= Ekbatan =

Ekbatan Town
- Planned town
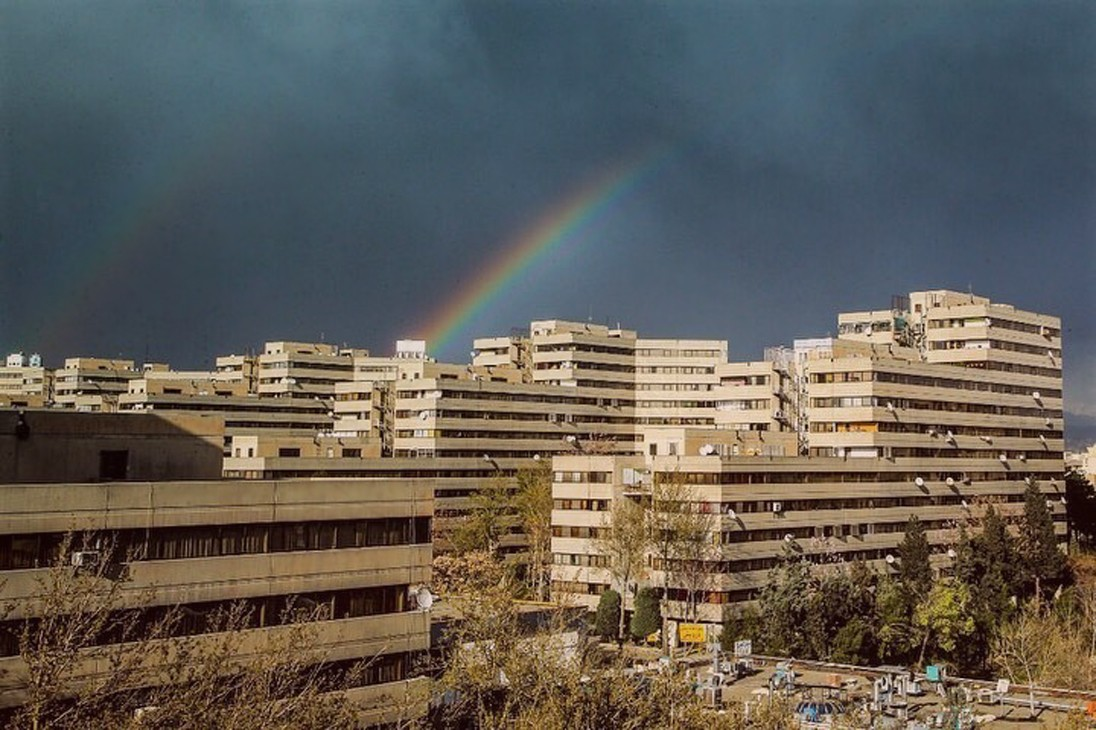
- Interactive map of Ekbatan Town
- Coordinates: 35.708°N 51.309°E
- City: Tehran
- Province: Tehran province
- Country: Iran

Ekbatan Town (Persian: شهرک اکباتان, Šahrak-e Ekbātān) is a planned town in western Tehran, Iran. It is located approximately five kilometers west of central Tehran. It is one of the most famous neighborhoods in Tehran because of its modern architecture, unique history, and intellectual cultural atmosphere.

== Etymology ==
The town is named after Ecbatana, the capital city of the ancient Median Empire around 700 BC. It was the first capital of ancient Iranians to be established in West Asia, and is the ancestor of the modern city of Hamedan.

The word Ekbātān (Persian: اکباتان) is a variant of Ecbatana (Greek: Εκβάτανα Ekbátana) which derives from Old Persian Haŋgmetana, meaning "place of gathering".

== History ==
=== Construction ===
The construction of Ekbatan was started in 1975, for the purpose of mass housing. It was designed by Rahman Golzar, Architect Dr. Fereidoun Azari, and American architecture firm ‘Gruzen Partnership’. Phase 1 of the town was then successfully built and completed by the American company Starrett, before the 1979 Revolution.

At the beginning, Ekbatan was the largest property development by a privately held company in Western Asia. The constructors also owned Ekbatan Bank, which was one of the fastest growing privately held banks in Western Asia. The constructor group was owned in majority by Rahman Golzar and his family, and in minority by Mohammad Ali Bagherzadeh. In 1977, Mohammad Ali Bagherzadeh transferred his shares in the group to his children Ali and Goli.

=== After the 1979 Revolution ===
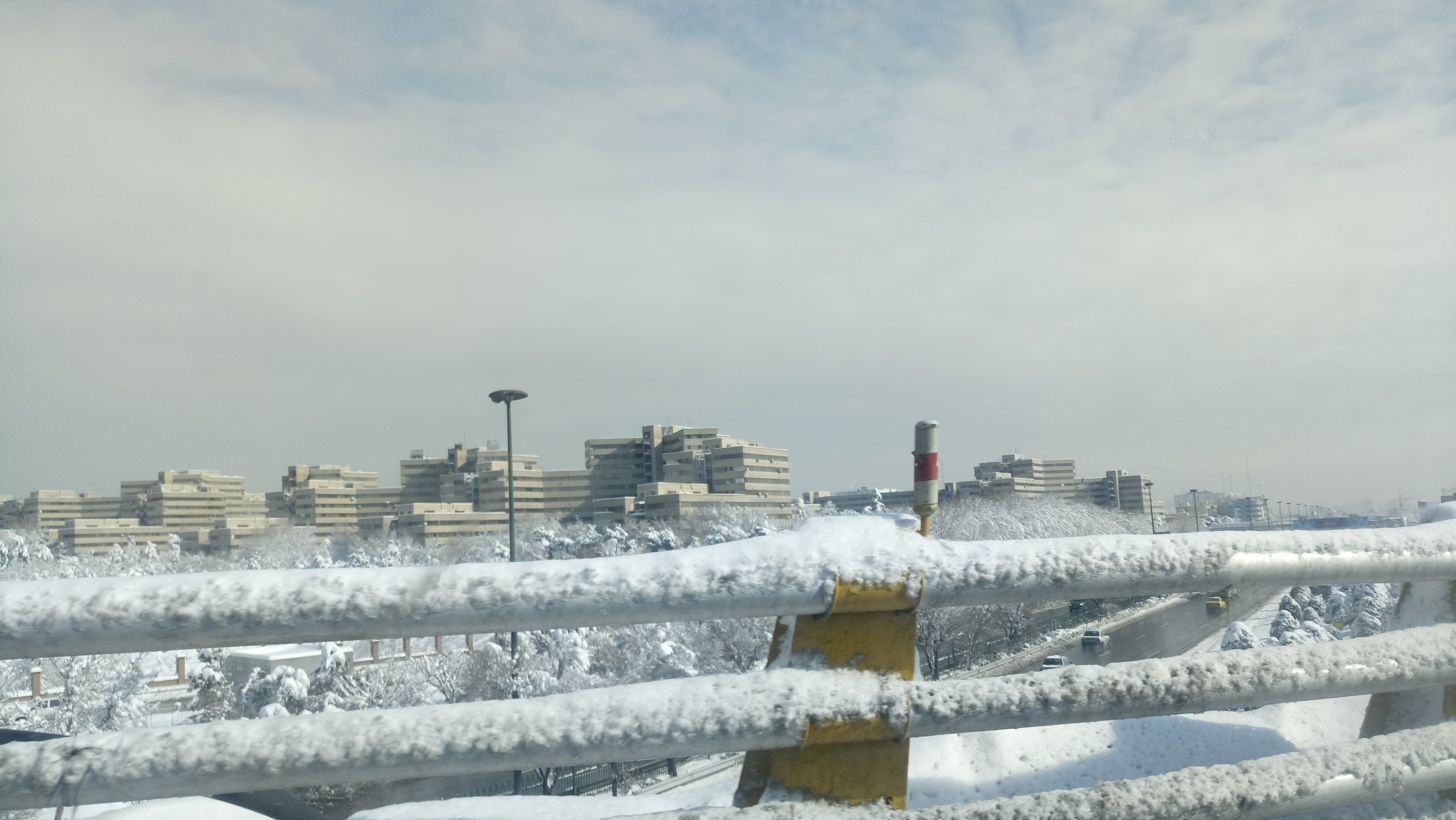
Ekbatan in snow

Following the 1979 Revolution, the new incoming government nationalized the group and all its subsidiaries and affiliates, and placed its ownership with the Ministry of Housing, it was later sold to public and is now privately owned. Ekbatan Bank was nationalized at the same time, subsumed into the new state bank created to be the successor to Iran's privately held banks.

== Infrastructure ==
=== Phases ===
Ekbatan has 15,500 units on an area of 2,208,570 square meters. It has three separate sets of buildings called phases (Persian: fāz), and each phase has independent buildings categorized as a block. The architecture in the first and third phases are similar, and are very different from Phase 2. Each block of Phase 1 (and of Phase 3) has three major steps. When looked at from the sides, there are five floors in first step, nine in second and twelve in the third one. At Phase 2, blocks are designed like huge twelve-story box-shaped parts that are put together in an angle. Another difference between Phase 1 (or Phase 3) and Phase 2 is the interior layout of the apartments. At Phase 1 (and Phase 3), apartments are single-floored. However, at Phase 2, they are built mostly in double floors (duplex) with hall, and the kitchen in the first floor and rooms placed in the upper (second) floor. At all of these phases you could find one-, two-, three- or four-roomed apartments that begin from about 50 m^{2} to 240 m^{2}.

There are frequent green fields between the buildings in Ekbatan. The landscape is designed in a way to combine nature and modern living together; a concept that, due to environmental concerns, is being explored more in architectural practices.

Mega Mall in Ekbatan

There are several different level schools in all three phases of Ekbatan. The town also has a variety of shopping places, such as the Mega Mall located at Phase 2, which have developed within the recent years.

=== Transportation ===
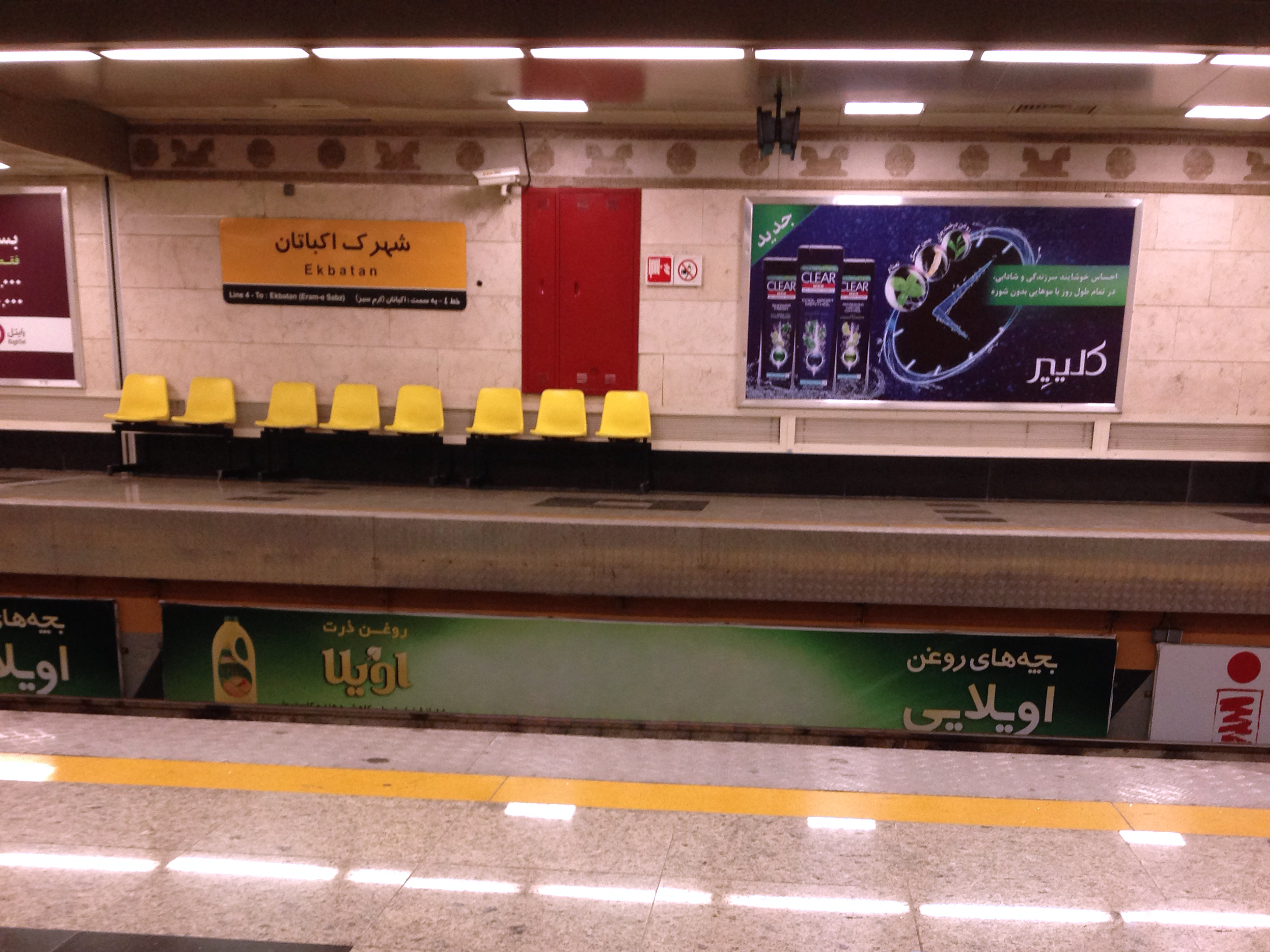
Tehran Metro's Ekbatan Metro Station.

The town is served by Ekbatan (Shahrak-e Ekbatan) and Ekbatan (Eram-e Sabz) stations of the Tehran Metro system.

The main boulevard in Phase 2 is named after IRNA reporter Mahmoud Saremi, a terrorism-victim killed by Taliban while working in Mazar-i-Sharif.

== Culture ==
Shahrak-e Ekbatan has a distinct social and cultural identity within Tehran, shaped by its modernist architecture, communal spaces, and history of civic participation. Originally developed in the 1970s to accommodate middle-income professionals and civil servants, the neighbourhood has historically been associated with an educated, predominantly middle-class population, including teachers, engineers, and other professionals. Its residential community also includes upper-middle-class households, students, and younger professionals. That made a deep sense of belonging among the residents that sets it apart from other neighborhoods in Tehran.

Ekbatan's urban design, characterised by extensive green spaces, pedestrian pathways, shared courtyards, and recreational facilities, has contributed to a strong sense of community among residents. The neighbourhood is also associated with a relatively socially liberal and culturally active urban environment, particularly among younger generations. Its communal spaces have traditionally served as gathering places for social interaction, recreation, and cultural activities.

On the eve of the last Wednesday of the Iranian year, before Nowruz, Ekbatan hosts one of the largest Chaharshanbe Suri celebrations in Tehran. For several decades, the festivities have brought residents together for bonfires, music, and dancing, occasionally resulting in confrontations with security forces.

Ekbatan is also famous for its graffiti and street art, and is associated with artists such as A1one and Oham. The neighbourhood has a vibrant underground music scene, with several independent musicians beginning their artistic activities there, including the rock band 127 and rapper Rez.

=== Civic and political activism ===
Ekbatan has a history of civic engagement and collective action among its residents. Community organisations have participated in campaigns concerning urban development, environmental protection, and the preservation of shared public spaces. In 2015, residents organised protests and petitions opposing construction projects affecting communal green areas, collecting approximately 25,000 signatures.

The neighbourhood also became a prominent location for demonstrations during the 2022–2023 protests in Iran, associated with the Woman, Life, Freedom movement. Residents participated in demonstrations and nightly protests, including chanting slogans from apartment windows and gathering in communal courtyards. These activities attracted significant media attention and were followed by security crackdowns and arrests.

In March 2023, a group known as the "Ekbatan girls" attracted international attention after a video showing five teenage girls dancing without mandatory headscarves in a residential courtyard went viral. The video, associated with protests against restrictions on women's rights in Iran, led to their detention and reports that they were pressured into issuing a public apology.

Ekbatan's history of neighbourhood mobilisation, cultural expression, and political demonstrations has contributed to its reputation as a centre of civic activism in Tehran.

=== Sport ===
The Ekbatan Stadium (a.k.a. the Rah Ahan Stadium) is located in Ekbatan Town. Formerly known as the Apadana Stadium, it was owned by Persepolis F.C., and is today the home stadium of Rah Ahan F.C. It was one of the hosts of preliminary round of the football matches at the 1974 Asian Games (Group A and Group C).

The Dastgerdi Stadium (a.k.a. the Pas Stadium) is also located in Ekbatan Town. It is where the former Pas F.C. was based in, and now hosts the national under-20 football team of Iran. It was also home to the 2005 Iranian Super Cup between Foolad and Saba Battery football clubs.

Ekbatan and Dastgerdi stadiums hosted the 2012 AFC U-16 Championship.
