= Tehran Metro Line 4 =

Railway line in Tehran, Iran

Overview
- Native name: خط ۴ مترو تهران
- Owner: Tehran Urban and Suburban Railways Organization (Metro)
- Locale: Tehran, Tehran Province
- Termini: Allameh Jafari; Shahid Kolahdooz Station
- Stations: 20+3 branch (Excluding proposed Eastern and Western expansions)

Service
- Type: Rapid transit
- System: Tehran Metro
- Operator(s): Tehran Urban and Suburban Railways Organization (Metro)
- Depot(s): Shahid Kolahdooz Depot

History
- Opened: 19 April 2008; 18 years ago
- Last extension: March 15, 2016

Technical
- Line length: 26 km (16 mi)
- Track gauge: 1,435 mm (4 ft 8 1/2 in)
- Electrification: Third rail
Route map
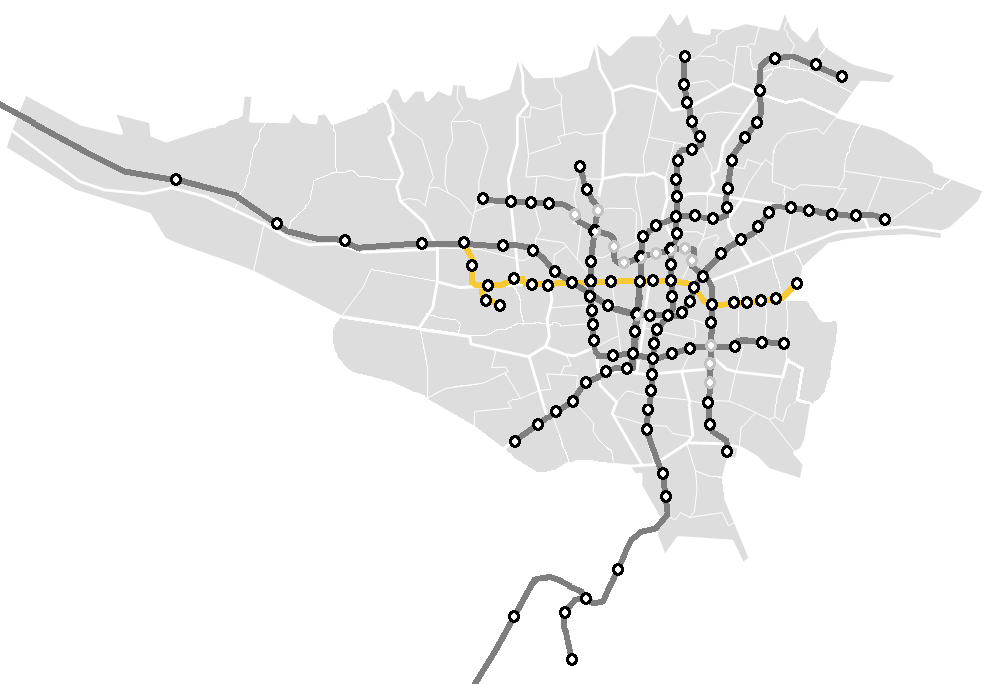

Line 4 is one of several lines of the Tehran Metro. The line is 26 km (16 mi) with 20 main stations, three stations along a domestic airport-serving branch line and a terminal (depôt).

Its section 1, from Ferdowsi Square to Darvazeh Shemiran, opened in April 2008. Section 2 from Darvazeh shemiran to Shohada Square opened in February 2009. Three months later Section 3 from Ferdowsi Square to Engelab Square opened. On 23 July 2012 two more stations were inaugurated, connecting line 4 with line 5.

Twenty stations serve Line 4's trunk line, plus two more on the branch line serving the country's most-used Domestic Airport, Mehrabad Airport.

== Route ==
The line begins with an interchange station with Line 5 at Eram-e Sabz Station, north of the Tehran-Karaj Freeway near Eram-e Sabz Park in western Tehran.

It heads southward through Ekbatan town then turns east, running along Karaj Makhsus Road, Azadi Square, Azadi Street, and Enghelab Street. This main axis continues for 11.2 km (7.0 mi). The line turns southeast briefly along Rowshandelan Street and until Shohada Square. Then it resumes an eastward course along Piruzi Street. Then it veers north-eastwards and runs along the Doran Expressway until reaching its eastern terminus, Shahid Kolahdooz Station.

== Route map ==
=== Mehrabad Airport Extension ===
The 2 km (1.2 mi) branch line starting from Bimeh Station towards Mehrabad International Airport was opened on 15 March 2016. The branch generally acts as an independent line, using unique, more luggage-friendly trains; Bimeh Station is an interchange station. The branch has three stations, including Bimeh Station.

== Future ==
=== North-West expansion ===
A 5.2 km (3.2 mi) extension north from Eram-e Sabz Station is proposed. The new extension will have 4 stations and run along Shahayegh Boulevard and Jannatabad Boulevard so serve the Jannat Abad neighbourhood in Northeastern Tehran.

=== Eastern expansion ===
A 9.3 km (5.8 mi) extension northeast-wards from Shahid Kolahdooz Station is proposed. The proposed section will run elevated along Doran Expressway to Damavand Street. Then, it will continue north along Hajar-ebn Ady Street and Estakhr Street. The extension will serve Tehranpars and Qanat Kowsar neighbourhoods.
