= Javadiyeh Metro Station =

Station of the Tehran Metro

Javadiyeh Metro Station ایستگاه مترو جوادیه

General information
- Location: Javadiyeh, Districts 11-16, Tehran, Tehran County; Tehran Province, Iran
- Coordinates: 35.6593°N 51.3878°E
- System: Tehran Metro Station
- Operator: Tehran Urban and Suburban Railways Organization (Metro)
- Connections: Tehran BRT: BRT 4

History
- Opened: 2 Ordibehesht 1393 H-Kh (22 April 2014)

Services
Preceding station	Tehran Metro	Following station
Rahahan towards Ghaem	Line 3	Zam Zam towards Azadegan
Location

Javadiyeh Metro Station is a station in line 3 of the Tehran Metro. It is located in the Javadiyeh neighbourhood of Tehran. The station has access through two long walkways, one to a local street, another to a pedestrian bridge crossing rail lines into Javadiyeh.
