= Sohrevardi Metro Station =

Station of the Tehran Metro

Sohrevardi Metro Station ایستگاه مترو سهروردی

General information
- Location: Beheshti Street- Sohrevardi Street; District 7, Tehran, Tehran County; Tehran Province, Iran
- Coordinates: 35°43′52″N 51°26′15″E
- System: Tehran Metro Station
- Operator: Tehran Urban and Suburban Railways Organization (Metro)

History
- Opened: 18 Mordad 1395 H-Kh (14 September 2016)

Services
Preceding station	Tehran Metro	Following station
Shahid Ghoddoosi towards Ghaem	Line 3	Shahid Beheshti towards Azadegan
Location

Sohrevardi Metro Station is a station in line 3 of the Tehran Metro. It is located next to the interchange of Behesti Street with Sohrevardi Street.
