= Heravi Metro Station =

Station of the Tehran Metro

Heravi Metro Station ایستگاه مترو هروی

General information
- Location: Sayyad Expwy - Giti St. District 4, Tehran, Tehran County; Tehran Province, Iran
- Coordinates: 35.7720518°N 51.4731197°E
- System: Tehran Metro Station
- Operator: Tehran Urban and Suburban Railways Organization (Metro)

History
- Opened: 16 Bahman 1395 H-Kh (4 February 2017)

Services
Preceding station	Tehran Metro	Following station
Hossein Abad towards Ghaem	Line 3	Shahid Zeyn-o-ddin towards Azadegan
Location

Heravi Metro Station is a station in line 3 of the Tehran Metro. It is located on Sayyad Expressway at not far from Heravi Sq. in Northwestern Tehran. The station is across from Golestan Hospital.
