= Shahrak-e Shari'ati Metro Station =

Station of the Tehran Metro

Shahrak-e Shari'ati Metro Station ایستگاه شهرک شریعتی

General information
- Location: Cheraghi Expressway; Districts 17–19, Tehran; Iran
- Coordinates: 35.6444°N 51.3686°E
- System: Tehran Metro Station
- Operator: Tehran Urban and Suburban Railways Organization (Metro)

History
- Opened: 11 Esfand, 1393 H-Kh (March 2, 2015)

Services
Preceding station	Tehran Metro	Following station
Zam Zam towards Ghaem	Line 3	Abdol Abad towards Azadegan
Location

Shahrak-e Shari'ati Metro Station is a station in line 3 of the Tehran Metro.
