= Hossein Abad Metro Station =

Station of the Tehran Metro

Hossein Abad Metro Station ایستگاه مترو حسین آباد

General information
- Location: Mozhdeh St., District 4, Tehran, Tehran County; Tehran Province, Iran
- Coordinates: 35°41′11″N 51°24′36″E
- System: Tehran Metro Station
- Operator: Tehran Urban and Suburban Railways Organization (Metro)
- Connections: Tehran Buses: 302 Beheshti Term. - Artesh Blvd.

History
- Opened: 22 Azar 1395 H-Kh (13 December 2016)

Services
Preceding station	Tehran Metro	Following station
Nobonyad towards Ghaem	Line 3	Heravi towards Azadegan
Location

Hossein Abad Metro Station is a metro train station in line 3 of the Tehran Metro. It is located on Mozhdeh Street at Hossein Abad neighbourhood in Northwestern Tehran.

This station is the 106th station of Tehran Metro with a unique architectural design constructed in 10,000 m^{2}of land area for which more than 85000 m^{3} of excavation, 25000 m^{2} of formwork, 35000 m^{3} of concrete and 4000 tons of reinforcement have been done. 16 escalators have been installed to carry passengers to various levels.

On 12 December 2016 with the speeches delivered by Tehran Mayor and CEO of Tehran Urban & Suburban Railway Co. and at presence of senior managers of Boland Payeh Co., Hossein Abad Metro Station is officially opened to public.

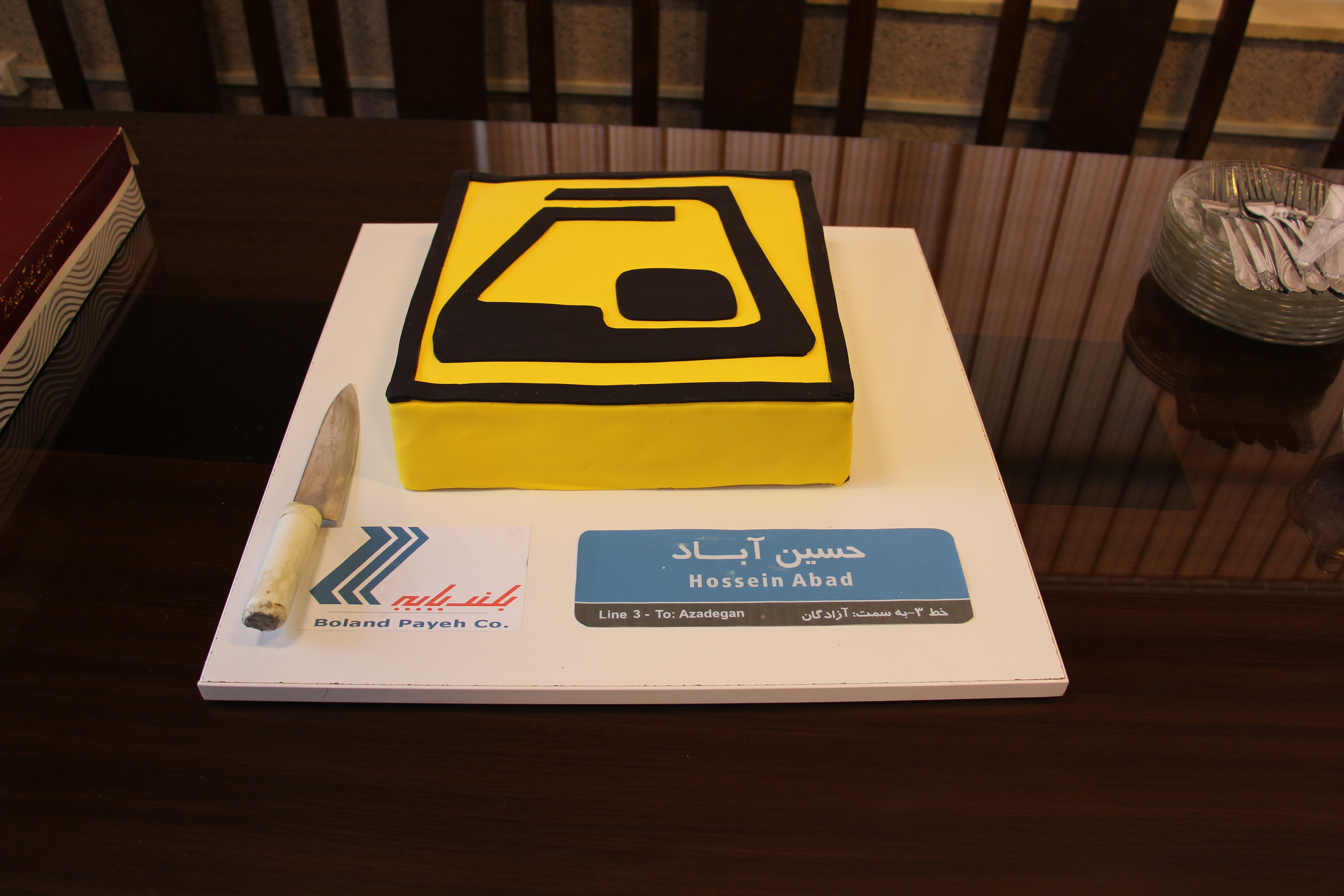

Boland Payeh Co. is the design and build contractor for construction of this station. The company has completed major parts of Line 3 of Tehran Metro, which connects south-west of Tehran to its north-east.
