= Abdol Abad Metro Station =

Station of the Tehran Metro

Abdol Abad Metro Station ایستگاه مترو عبدل آباد

General information
- Location: Cheraghi Expressway, Districts 17-19, Tehran; Iran
- Coordinates: 35.6381°N 51.3601°E
- System: Tehran Metro Station
- Operator: Tehran Urban and Suburban Railways Organization (Metro)
- Connections: Sarvari Bus Terminal Tehran Buses: 378 Sarvari Term.-Sadeghiye Metro; 384 Sarvari Term.-Enqelab Sq.; 417 Sarvari Term-Fayyazbakhsh Term.; 433 Sarvari Term.-Shahr-e Aftab

History
- Opened: 8 Tir, 1394 H-Kh (May 29, 2015)

Services
Preceding station	Tehran Metro	Following station
Shahrak-e Shari'ati towards Ghaem	Line 3	Ne'mat Abad towards Azadegan
Location

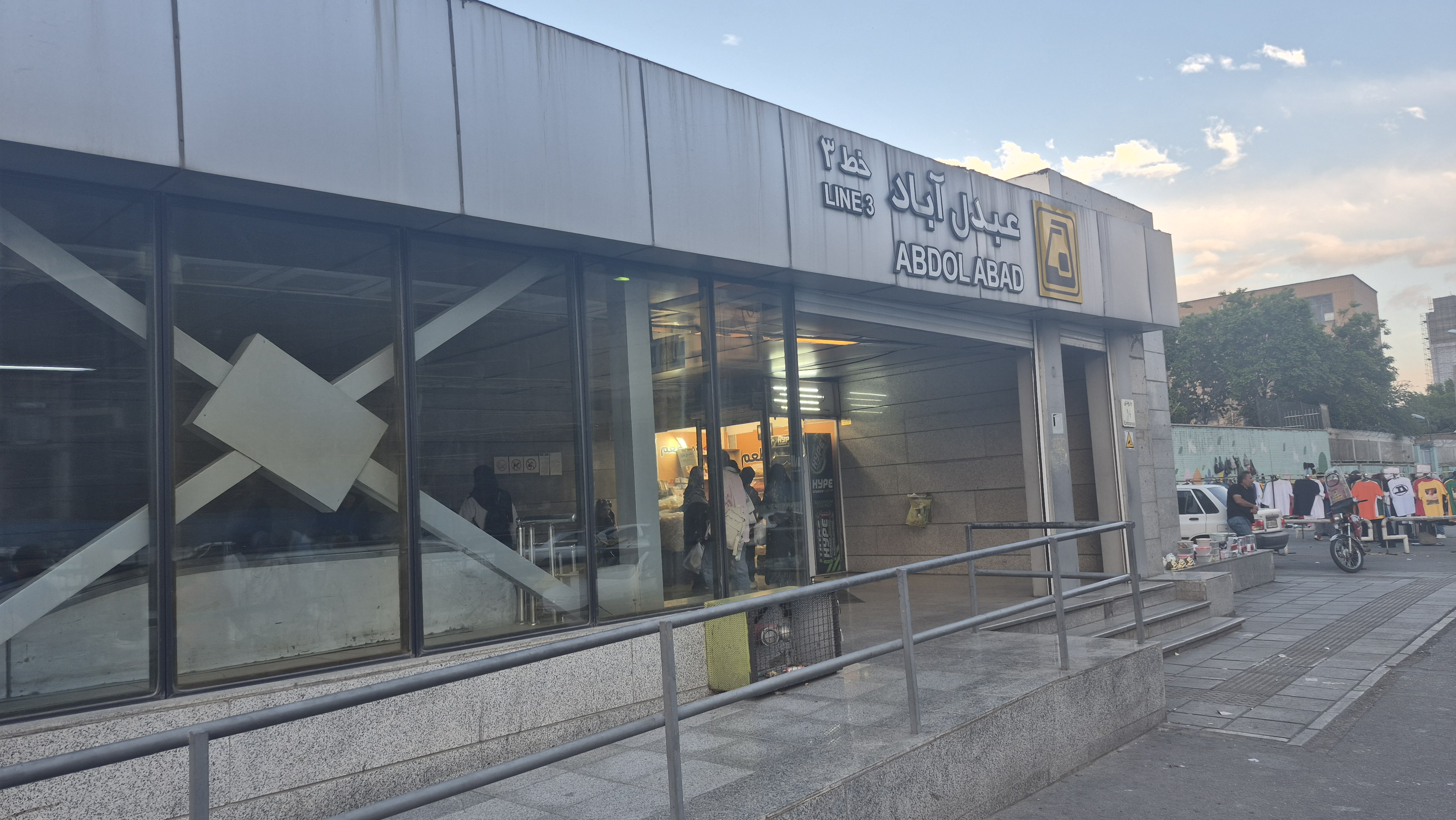

Abdol Abad Metro Station is a station in line 3 of the Tehran Metro.
