= Khajeh Abdollah-e Ansari Metro Station =

Station of the Tehran Metro

Khajeh Abdollah-e Ansari Metro Station ایستگاه مترو خواجه عبدالله انصاری
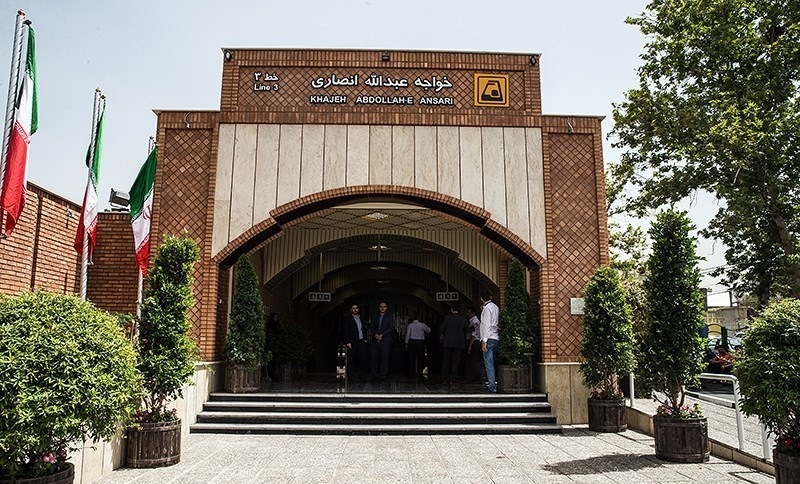

General information
- Location: Sayyad Exp'way- Resalat Exp'way; Khajeh Abdollah St., District 4, Tehran, Tehran County; Tehran Province, Iran
- Coordinates: 35°44′37″N 51°27′49″E
- System: Tehran Metro Station
- Operator: Tehran Urban and Suburban Railways Organization (Metro)

History
- Opened: 17 Khordad 1395 H-Kh (7 June 2016)

Services
Preceding station	Tehran Metro	Following station
Shahid Zeyn-o-ddin towards Ghaem	Line 3	Shahid Sayyad-e Shirazi towards Azadegan
Location

Khajeh Abdollah-e Ansari Metro Station is a station in line 3 of the Tehran Metro. It is located next to the interchange of Sayyad Expressway with Khajeh Abdollah Ansari Street and Resalat Expressway.
