= Zam Zam Metro Station =

Station of the Tehran Metro

Zam Zam Metro Station ایستگاه مترو زمزم

General information
- Location: Cheraghi Expressway, Districts 17-19, Tehran, Iran
- Coordinates: 35.6528°N 51.3733°E
- System: Tehran Metro Station
- Operator: Tehran Urban and Suburban Railways Organization (Metro)

History
- Opened: 1393 H-Kh (2014)

Services
Preceding station	Tehran Metro	Following station
Javadiyeh towards Ghaem	Line 3	Shahrak-e Shari'ati towards Azadegan
Location

Zam Zam Metro Station is a station in line 3 of the Tehran Metro. The station was formerly known as Qal'eh Morghi Station. In July 2015, the station name was changed to Zam Zam as part of the city council's consideration of polling of the public opinions.
