= Shahid Zeyn-o-ddin Metro Station =

Station of the Tehran Metro

Shahid Zeyn-o-ddin Metro Station ایستگاه مترو شهید زین‌الدین

General information
- Location: Sayyad Expressway- Zeinoddin Expressway, District 4, Tehran, Tehran County; Tehran Province, Iran
- Coordinates: 35°45′35″N 51°28′00″E
- System: Tehran Metro Station
- Operator: Tehran Urban and Suburban Railways Organization (Metro)

History
- Opened: 31 Shahrivar 1394 H-Kh (22 September 2015)

Services
Preceding station	Tehran Metro	Following station
Heravi towards Ghaem	Line 3	Khajeh Abdollah-e Ansari towards Azadegan
Location

Shahid Zeyn-o-ddin Metro Station is a station in line 3 of the Tehran Metro. It is located next to the interchange of Sayyad Expressway and Zeinoddin Expressway. And it has been named so as a memorial name for Mehdi Zeinoddin who was one of Iranian major generals during Iran-Iraq war.

== See also ==
- Mehdi Zeinoddin
