= Shahid Sayyad-e Shirazi Metro Station =

Station of the Tehran Metro

Shahid Sayyad-e Shirazi Metro Station ایستگاه مترو شهید صیاد شیرازی

General information
- Location: Sayyad Expressway; Masil-e Bakhtar Boulevard; District 7, Tehran, Tehran County; Tehran Province, Iran
- Coordinates: 35.734883°N 51.4593253°E
- System: Tehran Metro Station
- Operator: Tehran Urban and Suburban Railways Organization (Metro)

History
- Opened: 17 Aban 1395 H-Kh (7 November 2016)

Services
Preceding station	Tehran Metro	Following station
Khajeh Abdollah-e Ansari towards Ghaem	Line 3	Shahid Ghoddoosi towards Azadegan
Location

Shahid Sayyad Shirazi Metro Station, also referred to as Sayyad is a station in line 3 of the Tehran Metro. It is located at an exit from Sayyad Expressway to Masil Bakhtar Avenue, in Tehran's district 7.
