= Shahid Ghoddoosi Metro Station =

Station of the Tehran Metro

Shahid Ghoddoosi Metro Station ایستگاه مترو شهید قدوسی
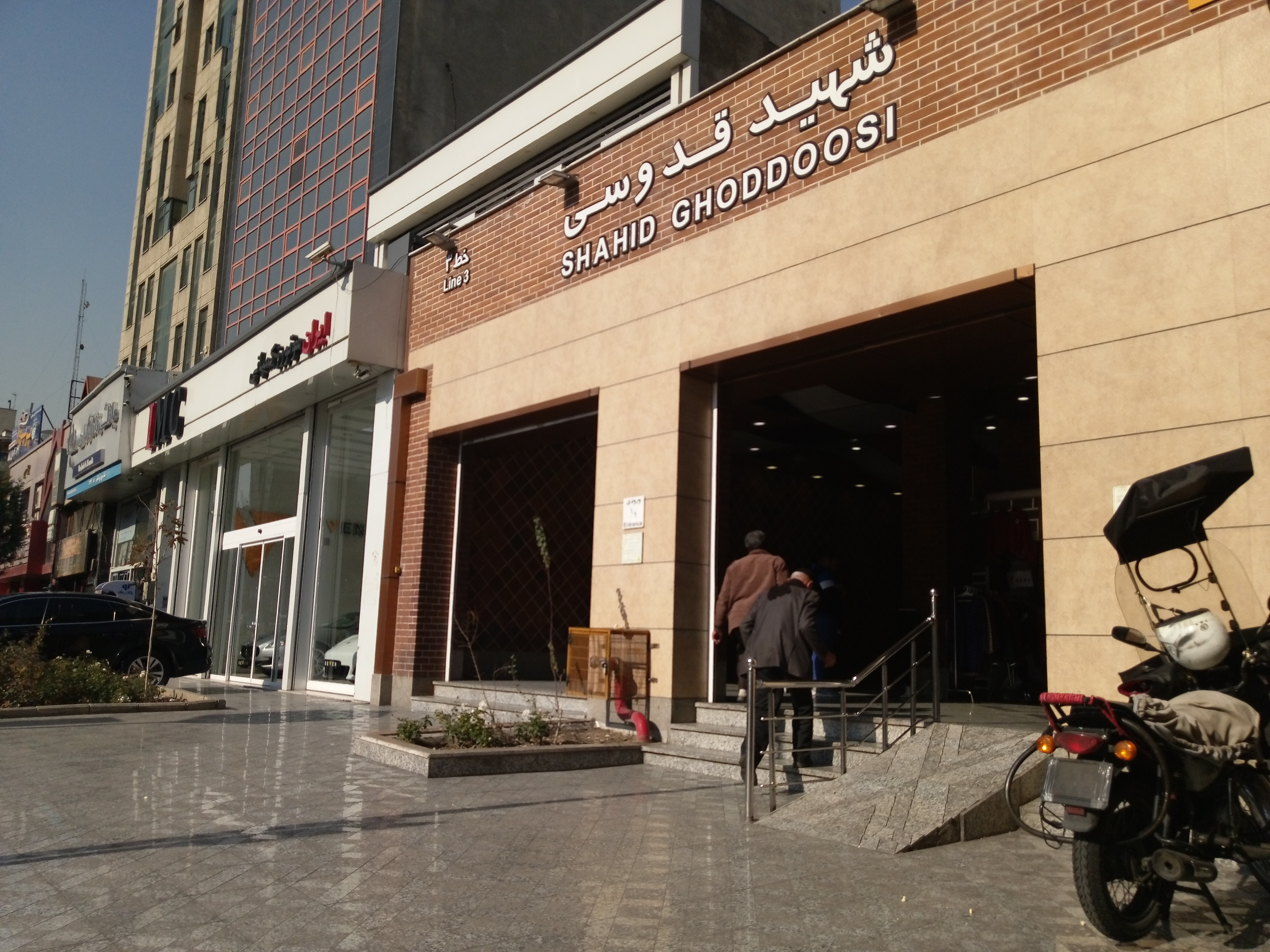

General information
- Location: Qasr Int.- Ghoddusi St. District 7, Tehran, Tehran County; Tehran Province, Iran
- Coordinates: 35.731460°N 51.445132°E
- System: Tehran Metro Station
- Operator: Tehran Urban and Suburban Railways Organization (Metro)

History
- Opened: 24 Shahrivar 1395 H-Kh (8 August 2016)

Services
Preceding station	Tehran Metro	Following station
Shahid Sayyad-e Shirazi towards Ghaem	Line 3	Sohrevardi towards Azadegan
Location

Shahid Ghoddoosi Metro Station is a station in line 3 of the Tehran Metro. It is located at Qasr intersection (Shariati & Shahid Beheshti Streets), in Tehran's district 7.
