= Tehran Now (neighborhood) =

Eastern neighbourhood in Tehran, Iran

Coordinates: 35°42′34″N 51°30′04″E

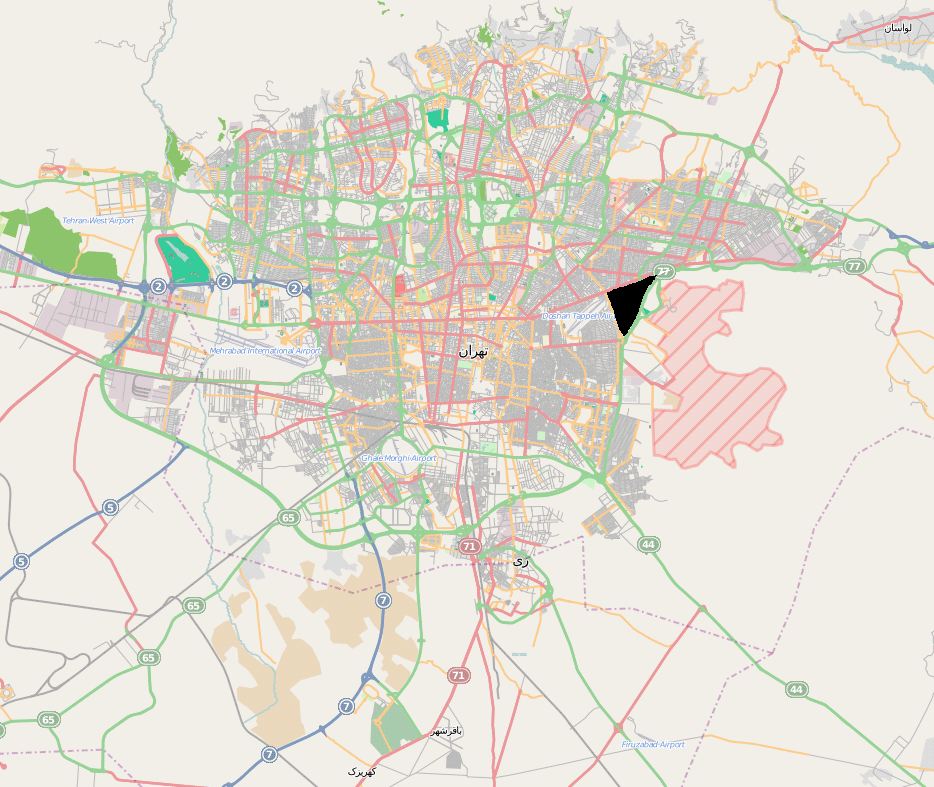
New Tehran in map of Tehran (in black)

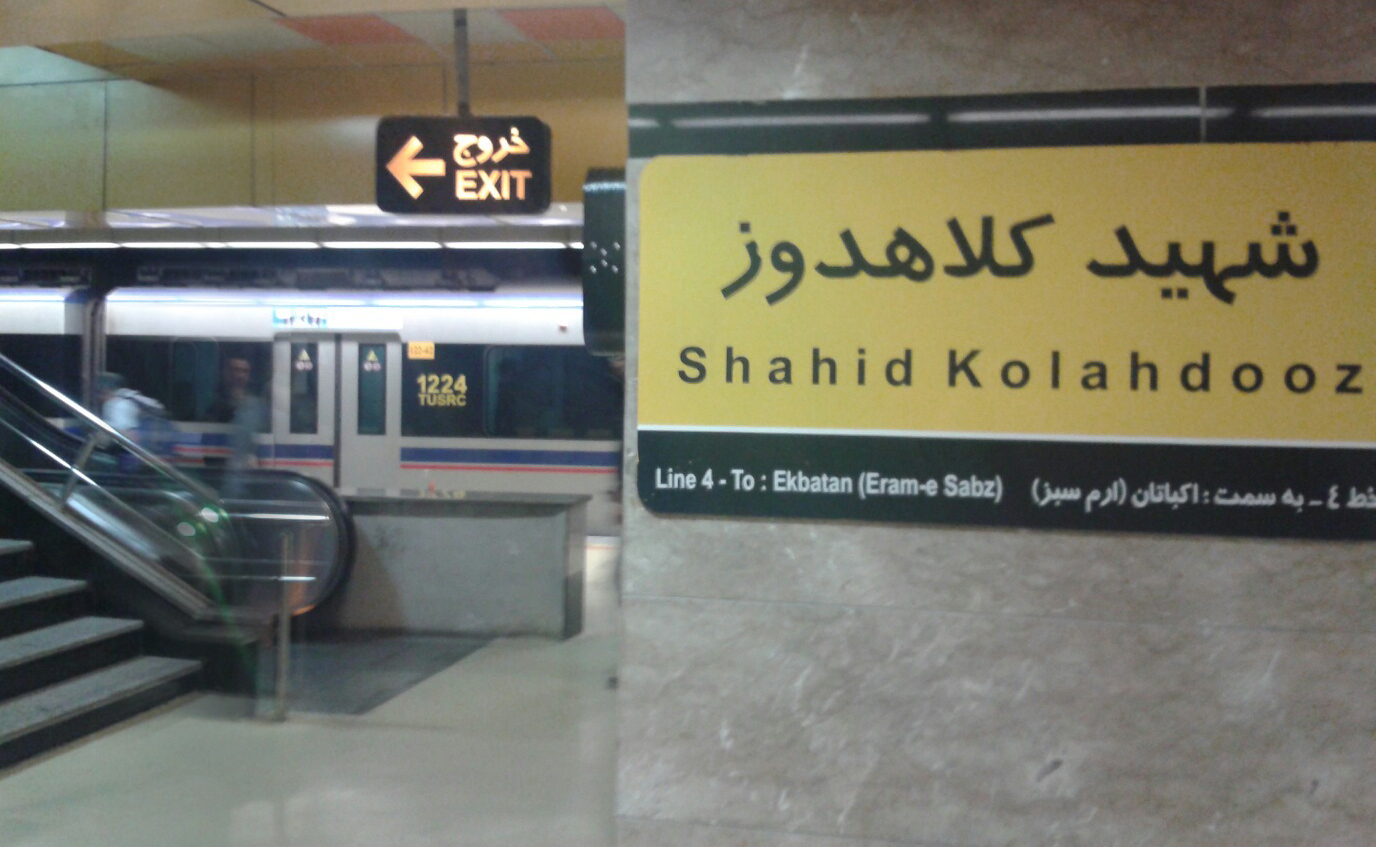
Shahid Kolahduz Station

New Tehran (تهران‌نو[tehɾɒːˈnːo]) is one of the eastern neighbourhoods of Tehran. It is located in region 13. It has 4 small squares, named Chaychi, Ettela'at, Ashtiani, and Lozi. However, Ashtiani Square has been torn down, because of the Bagheri Expressway's construction.

Before the Iranian Revolution, some of the streets were named by the words beginning with "Mehr," such as Mehrbar, Mehrafrooz, Mehrpoo, Mehravar, Mehrjoo, and Mehrayin. The previous name of Lozi Square was Mehr Square, but during the Iran–Iraq War, some were renamed after people killed in the war.
Other streets are named after famous poets, such as Hafez, Saadi Shirazi, Rudaki, Sa'eb Tabrizi, Bou'ali, Sanai, Ferdowsi, and Molavi.

The boundaries of Tehran Now are Damavand Street in the north, Piroozi in the south, Nirooye Havayi in the west, and Bagheri and Doran expressways in the east.

Parks near Tehran Now include Piroozi Park, Avesta Park, Danesh Amooz Park, and Saba Park. Sorkheh Hesar Forest in the east of Tehran Now is a well-used recreation area.

The nearest neighbourhoods to Tehran Now are Tehranpars, Narmak, Vahidiyeh, Nezam abad (North), Tehran shargh (East), Nirooye havayi (West).
