= Ne'mat Abad Metro Station =

Station of the Tehran Metro

Ne'mat Abad Metro Station ایستگاه مترو نعمت آباد

General information
- Location: Cheraghi Expressway, Districts 17-19, Tehran, Tehran County; Iran
- Coordinates: 35°38′02″N 51°20′52″E
- System: Tehran Metro Station
- Operator: Tehran Urban and Suburban Railways Organization (Metro)
- Connections: Tehran BRT: BRT 10

History
- Opened: 18 Aban, 1394 H-Kh (9 November 2015)

Services
Preceding station	Tehran Metro	Following station
Abdol Abad towards Ghaem	Line 3	Azadegan Terminus
Location

Ne'mat Abad Metro Station is a station in line 3 of the Tehran Metro.

The station has 2 entrances and 8 escalators. Its total depth is 16 meters below ground level.
