= Shahid Mahallati Metro Station =

Station of the Tehran Metro

Shahid Mahallati Metro Station ایستگاه مترو شهید محلاتی

General information
- Location: Artesh Expressway, District 1, Tehran, Shemiranat County; Tehran Province, Iran
- Coordinates: 35.7979673°N 51.5083881°E
- System: Tehran Metro Station
- Operator: Tehran Urban and Suburban Railways Organization (Metro)
- Connections: Tehran BRT: BRT 6; BRT 9

History
- Opened: 27 Khordad 1396 H-Kh (17 June 2017)

Services
Preceding station	Tehran Metro	Following station
Ghaem Terminus	Line 3	Aghdasiyeh towards Azadegan
Location

Shahid Mahallati Metro Station is one of the stations of Line 3 of Tehran Metro, located at Artesh Expressway in Northeastern Tehran.
