= Sakineh Ghasemi =

Iranian prostitute executed by order of the Islamic Revolutionary Court

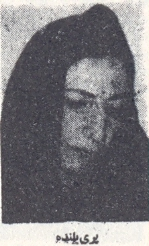
- Newspaper picture of Ghasemi
- Died: 12 July 1979; Tehran, Iran
- Cause of death: Execution by firing squad
- Resting place: Behesht-e Zahra Cemetery
- Other names: Pari Bolandeh, tall fairy
- Occupation: Prostitute
- Criminal charges: Waging war against God
- Criminal penalty: Execution

Sakineh Ghasemi, also known as Pari Bolandeh and commonly referred to as the tall fairy, was an Iranian sex worker. She was arrested after the 1979 Iranian Revolution and the burning of the Shahr-e No neighbourhood, and was executed on 12 July 1979, along with two other sex workers, on charges of "waging war against God." In contemporary literature and popular culture, she has been mentioned many times.

== Biography ==
Ghasemi is thought to have been born in Qazvin and later moved to the Shahr-e No area of Gomrok, Tehran where she was the head prostitute in a brothel. According to a memoir published by a political prisoner Atefeh Jafari, Ghasemi was in the Qasr prison between 1972 and 1974. He wrote of her: "The tall fairy was beautiful and with a heart and courage and a reliable person."

=== Arrest ===
Following the revolution, prostitution was outlawed and parts of the red-light district of Shahr-e No were burnt down. Ghasemi was arrested along with other prostitutes including Simin BMW, Ashraf Chahar Cheshm, Shahla Abadani and Peri Siah.

=== Trial and sentencing ===
According to a short report in the Kayhan newspaper, the only official source available, Ghasemi was tried in the "First Branch of the Islamic Revolutionary Court." The verdict was handed down after several hearings. Part of the sentencing report reads: "... a life of prostitution and corruption and the buying and selling of young girls and women, and establishing centres of prostitution which causes deviation of the younger generation of this country. You are sentenced to death.”

=== Execution ===
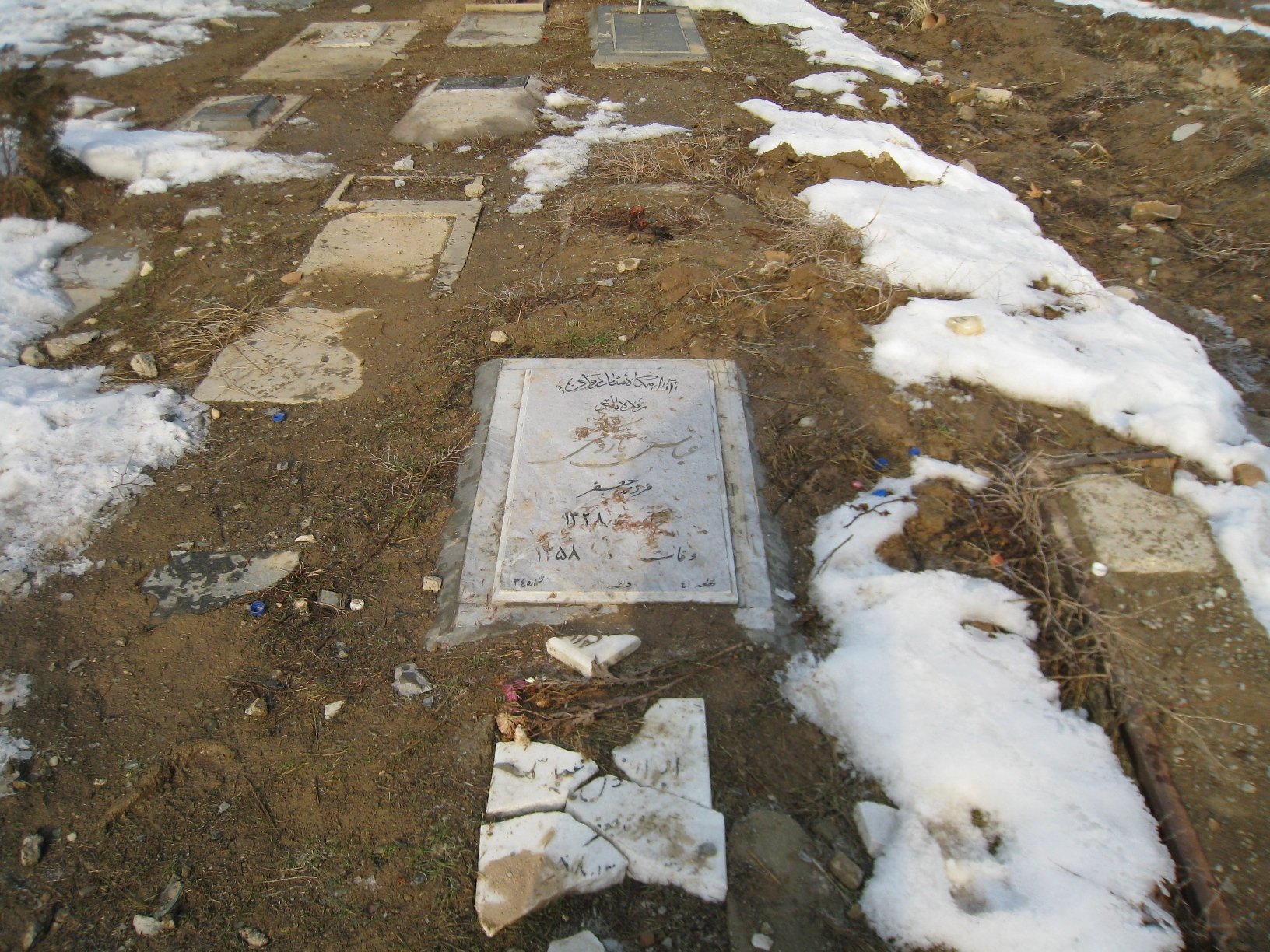
Sakineh Ghasemi's grave in Behesht Zahra in 2007

Four defendants, including Ghasemi, were executed at one o'clock in the morning on 12 July 1979. The place and method of execution has not been given, although the headline of that day's Kayhan newspaper read: "3 women and 4 men were shot by the orders of the Islamic Revolutionary Courts." According to some unofficial reports, Ghasemi was hanged in front of the cafe Shkvfhnv.

Ghasemi was buried on the same day as her execution in Behesht-e Zahra Cemetery. Her body is buried in "Plot 41, Row 87, Tomb 35".

Ghasemi's name is among 438 people whose execution was announced in a 1979 report of Amnesty International.

== In literature ==
"Tall Fairy" has found her way into popular and everyday language and even contemporary literature:

- In the novel In The Province Of Temperature, author Houshang Golshiri describes her dancing.
- In the play Hamlet with Salad, written by Akbar Radi, the name of the characters is "fairy tall".
- Radi is quoted in the novel My Tribe: "They say that in Jamshid Street, they beat me up a lot, saying that I was a smuggler and a pawnbroker in a new city. Yes, one of them says the fairy was tall, she was martyred."
- The story of Children of the Soil refers to the abuse of begging girls by the character of the story, who is called the "tall fairy".
- Bloodthirsty by Mehdi Yazdani Khoram
- Seismic language by Nasser Najafi
- Jamshid Child Prison Conversations
- Poems of the life of a poet by Hussein Sharang

== See also ==
- Prostitution in Iran
