= Rahahan Metro Station =

Station of the Tehran Metro

Rahahan Metro Station ایستگاه مترو راه‌آهن
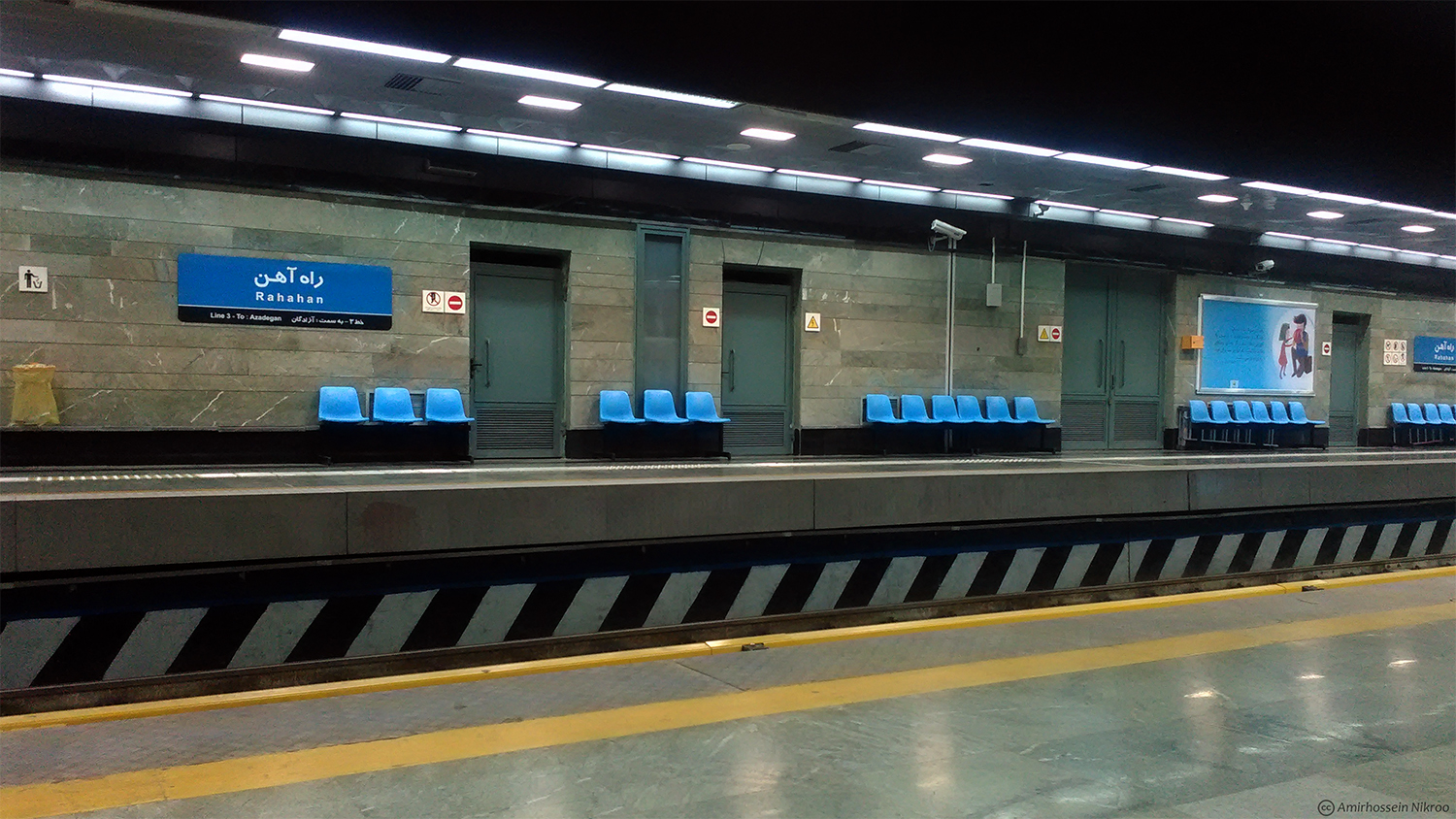

General information
- Location: Rah Ahan Square, Districts 11-16, Tehran, Tehran County; Tehran Province, Iran
- System: Tehran Metro Station
- Operator: Tehran Urban and Suburban Railways Organization (Metro)
- Connections: Tehran railway station Tehran BRT: BRT 7 · 107 Rahahan-Tajrish · 152 Rahahan-Parkway; Tehran Buses: 245 Rahahan-Naziabad-Shahr-e Rey Metro; 246 Rahahan-Khazaneh-Shahr-e Rey Metro; 258 Javadieh-Fayyazbakhsh Term.; 259 Shahrak-e Valfajr-Moein Term.; 275 Imam Khomeini Hospital-Moein Term.; 320 Rahahan-Khorasan Sq.; 330 Rahahan-Parking Shahr-e Rey; 336 Rahahan-Qods Blvd.; 349 Rahahan-Mahallati Exp'way; 359 Rahahan-Haft-e Tir; 365 Khaniabad-e No-Enqelab Sq.; 366 Vesal Blvd.-Enqelab Sq.; 367 Terminal-e Jonub-Enqelab Sq.; 417 Sarvari Term.-Fayyazbakhsh Term.; 430 Rahahan-Shahr-e Aftab; 907 Rahahan-Tajrish; 911 Rahahan-Emam Hossein Sq.

History
- Opened: 2 Ordibehesht 1393 H-Kh (April 22, 2014)

Services
Preceding station	Tehran Metro	Following station
Mahdiyeh towards Ghaem	Line 3	Javadiyeh towards Azadegan
Location

Rahahan Metro Station is a metro station in line 3 of Tehran metro, located in Rahahan Square. As suggested by the name, it is connected with Tehran Railway Station (Persian: ايستگاه راه آهن تهران, Istgah-e Rah Ahan-e Tehran)

== See also ==
- List of Tehran Metro stations
