= Mahallati Expressway =

Expressway in Tehran, Iran

Shahid Mahallati Expressway
- بزرگراه شهید محلّاتی
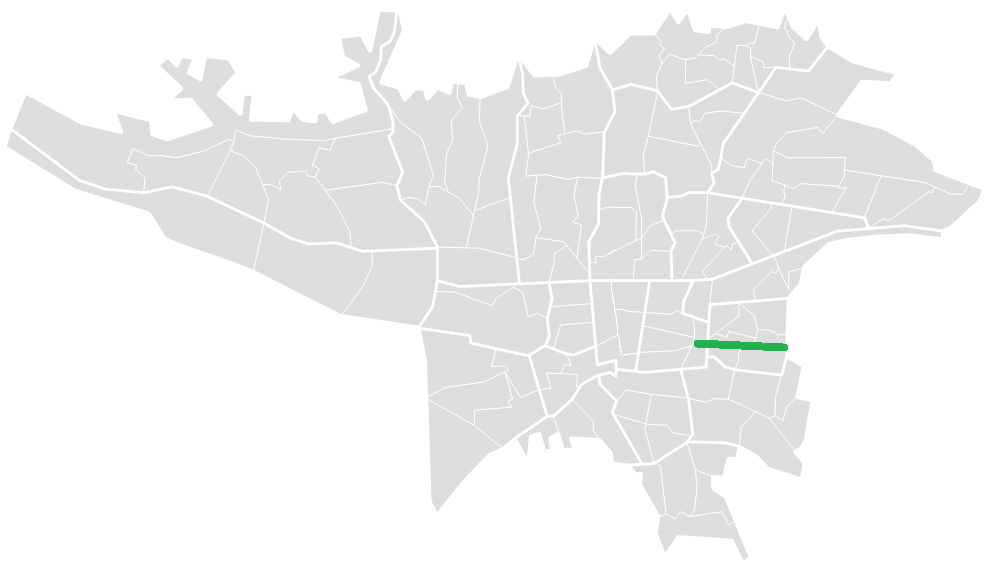

Route information
- Length: 4.9 km (3.0 mi)

Major junctions
- East end: Basij Expressway
- West end: Panzdah-e-Khordad Street; Rey Street

Location
- Country: Iran
- Major cities: Tehran

Highway system
- Highways in Iran; Freeways

Mahallati Expressway (Persian: بزرگراه محلّاتی) is an expressway in southeastern Tehran. It is from the east end of Panzdah-e-Khordad Street to Basij Mostazafin Expressway.

From East to West
	Basij Expressway
	Abuzar Boulevard
	Nabard Boulevard
	Dahom-e Farvardin Boulevard
Mahallati Square	Imam Ali Expressway southern expansion
	17 Shahrivar Street
	Panzdah-e-Khordad Street; Rey Street
From West to East
