= Chastity house =

A chastity house (or morality house) is a proposed but not ratified facility in Iran where couples can interact with each other to perform Nikah mut‘ah.

In 2002, the main reason for reinstatement of chastity houses given to public was to prevent prostitution from spreading in the cities.

== Supporters of chastity houses ==
Several prominent conservative clerics have proposed that prostitutes be placed in government-run shelters for destitute women to be called "chastity houses," where male customers could briefly marry them under the Shia practice of Nikah mut‘ah. Proponents of the idea argue that it would "eradicate social corruption" by legitimizing sexual relations between the men and women.

A supporter of the plan, Ayatollah Mohammed Mousavi Bojnurdi, said: "We face a real challenge with all these women on the street. Our society is in an emergency situation.” Hojatolislam Mohammed Taghi Fazel-Meibodi, a member of Qom Seminary, said the proposal is religiously legal. He said, "Our young people are troubled. There is poverty, unemployment, and more and more girls are escaping from their homes. In a society where there are sharp differences between rich and poor, rich men will use these poor girls for a quick thrill and to satisfy their impulses and lust."

== Opposition ==
Women's groups have been particularly outspoken about the idea of chastity houses. Shahrbanou Amani, a female Iranian parliamentarian, called the idea of establishing chastity house as "an insult and disrespectful to women." The Cultural Council for Women, a liberal Islamist women's group, said such houses would be a "deceitful and thinly disguised" form of prostitution.

== See also ==
- Prostitution in Iran
