= Shahr-e No =

Red light district located in Gomrok town of Tehran, Iran

Coordinates: 35.671917°N 51.388208°E

Shahr-e No (Persian: شهرنو, lit. 'New City') was the red-light district located in Gomrok, a south-western district of Tehran, Iran. It appeared in the 1920s and was destroyed in 1979; it employed about 1,500 women. Its location is now replaced with a park and a hospital.

== History ==
Prostitution in Tehran is known to have existed since the 1870s in various locations of the city (brothels were indicated by a lantern). During the following forty years, prostitutes gradually became more visible, displaying themselves in the streets. In March 1922, the government's interior ministry, then non-religious, organized a partial roundup of prostitutes and assembled them in Shahr-e No, an area close to the citadel. Tehran's other prostitutes joined them in the next eleven years, then Shahr-e No was circled with a 2.50 m high brick wall, with women being forbidden from leaving this area.

After the Iranian Revolution and the establishment of Islamic regime, in July 1979 a crowd which witnessed the death sentence of three women accused of procuring assaulted the district, burned the brothels, persecuted women and spread terror. At this time the area sprawled over 13 ha and hosted 1500 women, 753 street sellers, 178 shops and two theaters. The next year after Ayatollah Khomeini emerged as the Supreme Leader of Iran, the government demolished the red light district and flattened it with bulldozers, only leaving a barren area. Hooman Majd, author of The Ayatollah Begs to Differ, said that the Iranian government did this for Islamic reasons and to demonstrate the government's authority.

The Islamic Republic then strove to erase all memory of it, destroying books and movies which mentioned its existence. The city's maps are marked with a rectangle captioned: "parc in construction". Only rare witness accounts remain, such as the photographic series The Citadel by Iranian photojournalist Kaveh Golestan. The area wasn't refurbished until 1998, with a city park and a hospital.

== See also ==
- Prostitution in Iran
