= Damavand Street =

Street in Tehran, Iran

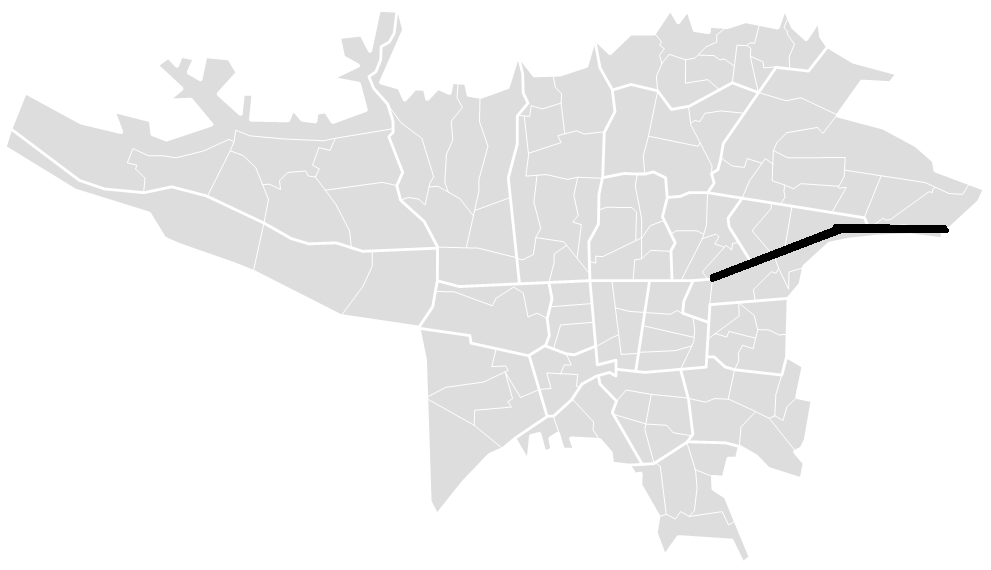
- Interactive map of Damavand Street
- Native name: خیابان دماوند (Persian)
- Length: 13 km (8.1 mi)
- East end: Zeinoddin Expressway; Yasini Expressway; Tehran-Damavand Expressway; Telo Road
- West end: Emam Hossein Square

Damavand Street is a street in central and eastern Tehran, Iran.

From East to West
	Yasini Expressway; Tehran-Damavand Expressway; Telo Road; Zeinoddin Expressway
U-Turn
	Jashnvare Street
U-Turn
Filling Station
	Resalat Expressway; Yasini Expressway
U-Turn
	Shahed Street
	Hojar-ebne-Ady Street; To; Yasini Expressway; Doran Expressway
Tehran BRT Line Tehranpars Crossroad Station
Tehran Eastern Bus Terminal
Tehran BRT Line Dariush Station
	Baqeri Expressway
Tehran BRT Line Khaqani Station
	Masil Jajrud Boulevard
Tehran BRT Line Abureyhan Station
	Ayat Street; Emamat Street
Tehran BRT Line Ayat Station
	Masil Bakhtar Boulevard; 30 Metri Niruye havaei Street
Tehran BRT Line Niruye Havaei Station
Tehran BRT Line Vahidiye Station
	Shahid Davoudi Street
Tehran BRT Line Sabalan Station
	Sabalan Street
Tehran BRT Line Forudgah Station
	Emam Ali Expressway
Tehran BRT Line Bu Ali Station
Filling Station
Tehran BRT Line Montazeri Station
Emam Hossein Square	17 Shahrivar Street
Continues as Enqelab Street
From West to East
