= Babayi Expressway =

Expressway in Tehran, Iran

Shahid Sarlashkar Babayi Expressway
- بزرگراه شهيد سرلشكر بابايی
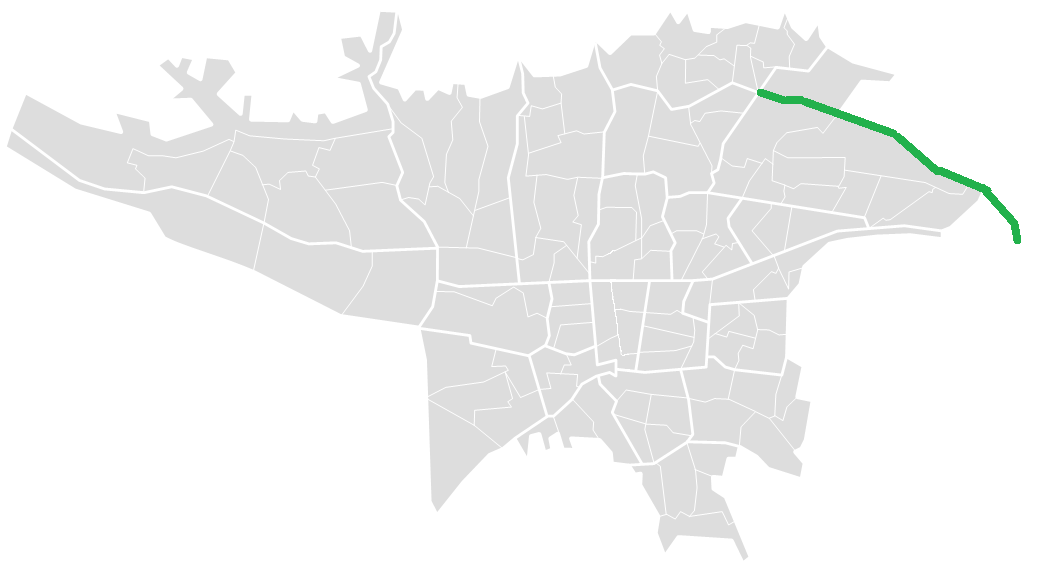

Route information
- Length: 16.5 km (10.3 mi)

Major junctions
- East end: Tehran-Damvand Highway; Tehran-Parchin Highway
- West end: Sadr Expressway; Pasdaran Street

Location
- Country: Iran
- Major cities: Tehran

Highway system
- Highways in Iran; Freeways

Babayi Expressway is an expressway in northeastern Tehran.

From East to West
Tehran-Damvand Highway; Tehran-Parchin Highway
Tehran-Pardis Freeway
Telo Road
Lashkarak Road
Hengam Boulevard
Niru-ye Zamini Boulevard
Imam Ali Expressway
Sayyad Expressway
Sadr Expressway; Pasdaran Street Nobonyad Metro Station
From West to East
