= Zeinoddin Expressway =

Road in Iran

Zeinoddin Expressway
- بزرگراه زین الدین
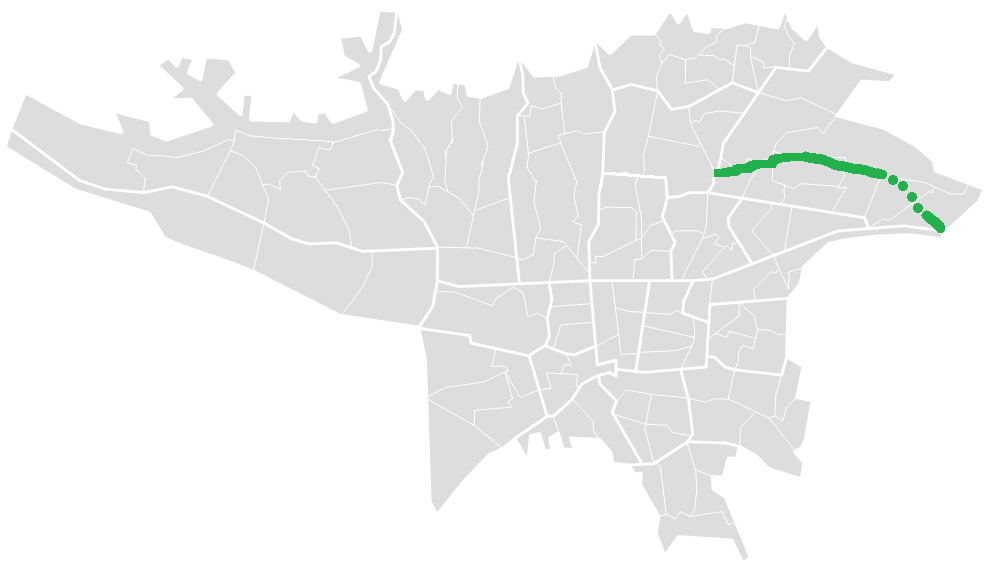

Route information
- Length: 21 km (13 mi)

Major junctions
- West end: Hemmat Expressway; Pasdaran Street; Shariati Street
- East end: Yasini Expressway; Telo Road; Damavand Street

Location
- Country: Iran
- Major cities: Tehran

Highway system
- Highways in Iran; Freeways

Zeioddin Expressway (Highway) Starts from western Tehran at Yasini Expressway and goes west. It ends in Pasdaran Street. The section between Hengam Boulevard and Parvin Boulevard was opened on 15 October 2011 the last 5 km from Parvin Boulevard to Yasini Expressway on 29 September 2012.

From East to West
Ab'ali Expressway; Yasini Expressway; Telo Road; Damavand Street
Ehsan Street; Ettehad Boulevard
Parvin Boulevard
Baqeri Expressway
Seraj Street
Esteqlal Boulevard; Hengam Boulevard
Imam Ali Expressway
Sayyad Expressway Shahid Zeyn-o-ddin Metro Station
Pasdaran Street; Shariati Street
Continues as Hemmat Expressway
From West to East
