= Doran Expressway =

Road in Tehran, Iran

Doran Expressway
- بزرگراه دوران
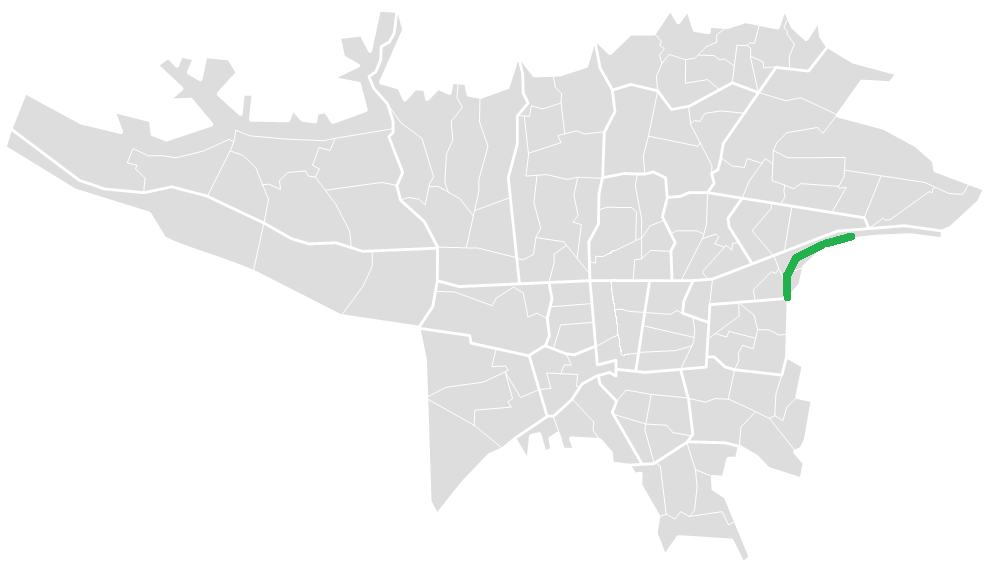

Route information
- Length: 4.5 km (2.8 mi)

Major junctions
- North end: Yasini Expressway; Damavand Street; Hojar-ebne-Ady Street
- South end: Basij Expressway; Piruzi Street; Si Metri Niru-ye Havaei Street

Location
- Country: Iran
- Major cities: Tehran

Highway system
- Highways in Iran; Freeways

Doran Expressway is the northern section of eastern part of Tehran ring road expressway network connecting Basij Expressway to Yasini Expressway.

From North to South
Yasini Expressway; Damavand Street; Hojar-ebne-Ady Street
Bagheri Expressway
Shahid Kolahdouz Metro Station
Basij Expressway; Piruzi Street; Si Metri Niru-ye Havaei Street
From South to North
