= Nobonyad Metro Station =

Station of the Tehran Metro

Nobonyad Metro Station ایستگاه مترو نوبنیاد

General information
- Location: Nobonyad Square- Pasdaran Street, District 1, Tehran, Shemiranat County; Tehran province, Iran
- Coordinates: 35°47′27″N 51°28′40″E
- System: Tehran Metro Station
- Operator: Tehran Urban and Suburban Railways Organization (Metro)
- Connections: Tehran BRT: BRT 6; Tehran Buses: 106 Artesh Blvd.-Parkway (BRT6); 214 Dastvareh Term.-Ofoq Term. (Shahrak-e Valfajr)

History
- Opened: 31 Shahrivar 1394 H-Kh (22 September 2015)

Services
Preceding station	Tehran Metro	Following station
Aghdasiyeh towards Ghaem	Line 3	Hossein Abad towards Azadegan
Location

Nobonyad Metro Station is one of the main stations of Line 3 of Tehran Metro, located on Nobonyad Square at the interface of Sadr and Babayi Highways in Northern Tehran. It has been designed and built by Boland Payeh Company as a project within a barter portfolio. With the presence of Maziyar Hosseini, Transportation and Traffic Deputy of Tehran Municipality, Habil Darvishi, managing director of Tehran Metro Company and Behrouz Nouri Khajavi, CEO of Boland Payeh Co., Southern Entrance of Nobonyad Station is opened to public on February 6, 2017.
