= Javadiyeh =

Neighbourhood in Tehran, Iran

Javadiyeh (Persian: جوادیه) is a neighbourhood located south of the city of Tehran in Iran. Among area young male residents the neighborhood was nicknamed "Texas" because of the associations of the U.S. state with the Wild West. Hooman Majd, the author of The Ayatollah Begs to Differ, explained that Javadiyeh was poor and run-down, but it was not necessarily a dangerous neighborhood.
