= Reza Zarei =

Former Chief of Tehran police

- Known for: Former Chief of Tehran Police (Guidance Patrol)
- Police career
- Police service: Islamic Republic of Iran Police
- Allegiance: Iran
- Department: Tehran Police (Guidance Patrol)
- Status: Dismissed
- Rank: Chief

Reza Zarei (Persian: رضا زارعی) is a former chief of Tehran Police in charge of the Guidance Patrol for Islamic values.

In March 2008, Zarei was found with six naked women in a house of prostitution in Tehran. Zarei was himself in charge of the so-called "Public security plan" which was aimed at enforcing Islamic dress code and fight indecent behavior of youth in the Iranian capital.

Zarei was arrested and lost his post. However, in an interview broadcast by the Islamic Republic of Iran Broadcasting, the next commander of Tehran police denied all the accusations against Zarei. On 23 April 2008, Zarei was transferred to a hospital after an attempted suicide.

== See also ==
- Prostitution in Iran
