= Ahang Expressway =

Expressway in Tehran, Iran

Ahang Expressway
- بزرگراه آهنگ
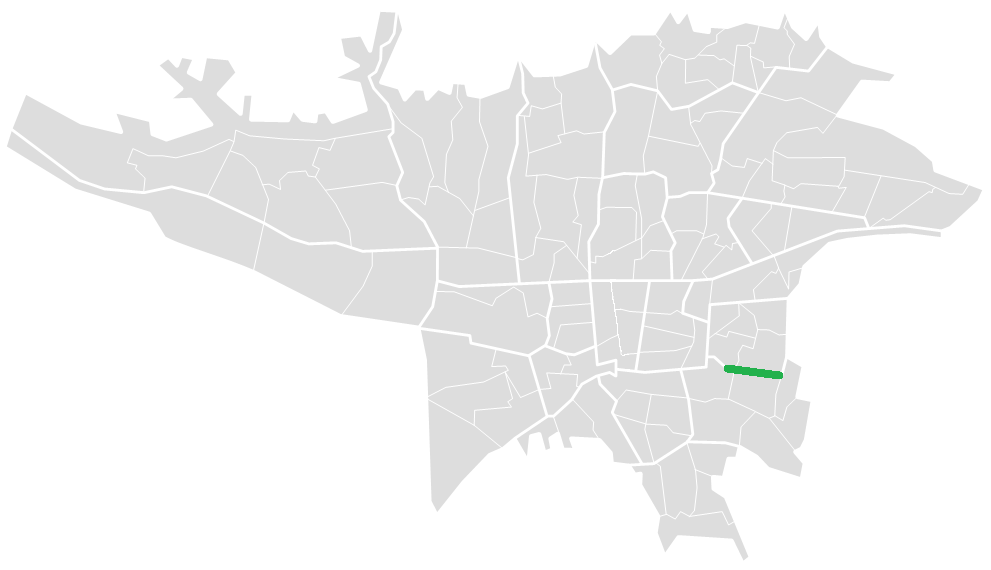

Route information
- Length: 2.5 km (1.6 mi)

Major junctions
- East end: Basij Expressway
- West end: Khavaran Street

Location
- Country: Iran
- Major cities: Tehran

Highway system
- Highways in Iran; Freeways

The Ahang Expressway (Persian: بزرگراه آهنگ) is an expressway in southeastern Tehran. It runs from the start of Tehran-Mashahd Highway to the Basij Mostazafin Expressway.

From East to West
Basij Expressway
Abuzar Boulevard
Nabard Boulevard
U-Turn
Kosar Boulevard
U-Turn
Dahom-e Farvardin Boulevard; 35 Metri Valiasr Street
18 Metri Meysam Street
Khavaran Street
From West to East
