= Niayesh Tunnel =

Road traffic tunnel in Tehran, Iran

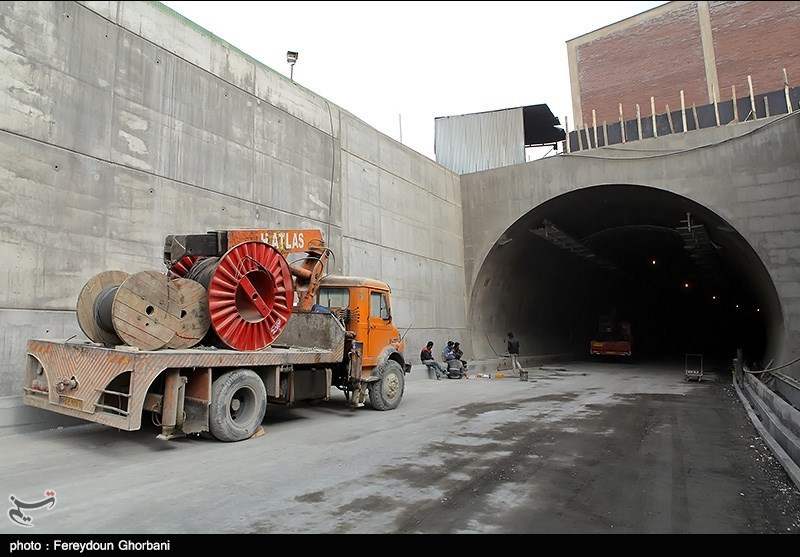
Tunnel

The Niayesh Tunnel Project is a road traffic tunnel in the north of Tehran, Iran. The Niayesh tunnel has two parallel roads that are within 130 m (430 ft) of each other for most of the route. Traffic in the north tunnel flows from east to west. In the south tunnel it flows from west to east.

For the first time in Iran, there are some embranchments of other tunnels among main tunnels. Among the north tunnel, Kordestan tunnel with a length of 950 m (3,120 ft) – the same length as the Resalat tunnel – is branched from the north tunnel that it makes accessible to downtown and Hemmat highway through a connection between the north tunnel and Kordestan Highway. Also, the north Kordestan highway would be connected to the south tunnel through a 194-metre (636 ft) tunnel that provides traffic flow to east Tehran. The total length of the main tunnels as the second longest urban tunnel in the world excluding ramps is 6,658 metres (21,844 ft). The total length of the main tunnels and access tunnels, including ramps, is 10,252 metres (33,635 ft).

== Project implementation ==
Main tunnel execution started 26 March 2011 after finishing the site mobilization. On 19 March 2012 all the excavation finished. The average rate of excavation in tunnel was 18.5 metres (61 ft) per day with NATM method of excavating. In this project 200,000 m^{3} (7,100,000 cu ft) soil excavated in the ramps areas.

All excavation volume	1,100,000 m3
Cutting volume	200,000 m3
Concrete volume	270,000 m3
All bar weights	60,000 ton

The concrete volume poured was 270,000 cubic metres (9,500,000 cu ft), of which 95 percent was done during 7 months using 17 formworks. The average rate of pouring concrete was 30 metres (98 ft) per day for the tunnel's full face. This project has 8,000-square-metre (86,000 sq ft) peripheral buildings which are built within three months. The 4,000-square-metre (43,000 sq ft) main control building was built by modern methods and prepared for ITS systems installation within two months. In executing parts of the project, considering the job difficulties, there were three working shifts each day that the number of labor achieved to 4800 persons and it can be considered 6000 persons including indirect workers.

=== The project’s branches in excavating and pouring concrete ===
- Tunnel excavation with the diameter of 18 m (59 ft) under overburden less than the tunnel's diameter in the length of 2.5 km in the Alluvium soil and urban area is one of this project's Characteristics. In tunneling it is common to excavate under 2 times of the tunnel's diameter overburden.
- Tunnel bifurcations excavation with 15 m (49 ft) overburden while the section width is 30 m (98 ft) and its height is 19 m (62 ft) – the same height as a 6-storey building.
- The tunnel excavation was controlled by surface and underground instruments. .
- Final lining thickness is 50 cm (20 in) in this tunnel which it is typically 70–120 cm (28–47 in) in previous tunnels.

The project's Attributes during exploitation

- The latest Europe safety standards have been engaged in the Niayesh tunnel. Emergency exit ways are prepared in each 250 m between tunnels and for each 500 m there are some access to the ground surface in Kordestan highway, Vali E Asr street, Nonahalan and Golshahr streets. These emergency exit ways are recognizable with green signs on the tunnel walls, green LED lights and panels.
- In these tunnels there are emergency rooms every 130 m (430 ft) that provide a connection with central control room for tunnels users. These rooms are equipped by fire-retardant doors, which can withstand fire for one hour.
- This tunnel's firefighting system is supplied by water and contains two main lines in each tunnel . One of them is next to the high-speed line for firefighting machine supplies and the other one is next to the low-speed line and is connected to firefighting panels in each 45 m for benefit of users during incidents. In those panels there are two fire extinguishers.
- In this tunnel there is a longitudinal ventilation system. There are 63 jet fans with 37.5 KW rated power. This system cables are resistant to fire up to 1.5 hour with the temperature of 950 °C. in emergency situation there is considered an air exchange station.
- For high-voltage power lines system in this project, 9 km (5.6 mi) cables have been inserted. This project has two connections: one from municipal power and another for the emergency situation, a power house with 6 MW power.
- Due to controlling installed facilities in Niayesh tunnel, the ITS has been used according to Europe standards and technology. In this system related signals would be transferred to equipment in control room and software will process them and then related scenario of each manner like fire, accident or .... would be performed.

=== ITS ===
- Traffic control system including traffic signs, lane control system (LCS), variable massage sign (VMS) and lights.
- Video monitoring system including automatic accident identifying and processing cameras and moving cameras.
- Ventilation control system of jet fans are able to order to jet fans based on information gained from air pollution sensors and visibility sensors.
- Fire announcement system through LHD cables.
- Fire retardants doors access tunnels to ground surface and emergency exits for cars would be opened with hydraulic motors by control room operators and make the possibility of cars conduction from the tunnel with fire to the safe tunnel.
- Emergency room doors.
- With the start of the radio system of the tunnel, firefighting, emergency, police and the tunnel's operator wireless system would be activated. And through ITS, related radio messages would be published on 4 available radio waves for cars in the tunnel.
- Announcement system is able to publish necessary points in addition to radio system via speakers installed to tunnel.
- All emergency exit signs, tunnel escape route signs, SOS, tunnel route control signs, VMS, Tunnel information signs and lights.
- Flood detection sensors in the entering and exit ramps.
- This tunnel's ITS controls light intensity considering the outside Brightness (night, day, cloudy, sunset, sunrise).
- ITS system software performs different scenarios based on data are gained from installed sensors and switches. For example, in a fire situation according to fire location which is identified by special cables, required jet fans would start to work, emergency doors would be opened at risk area and cameras would be focused on the incident place, then VMS would show escape ways. Other scenarios would be performed by ITS system in case of accident, flood, power outage etc.

Equipment	Numbers
Tunnel Lighting System	2867
Tunnel Ventilation System (Jet Fans)	62
AID Camera	116
PTZ Camera	57
Fixed Camera	18
EEIS (Emergency Exit Information Sign)	36
EPA (Emergency Phone Advice)	49
EWNL (Escape Way Navigation Light)	123
LCS (Lane Control Sign)	92
TIBD (Tunnel Information Board Display)	8
TL (Traffic Light)	24
LSP (Loud Speaker)	123
VMS (Variable Message Sign)	16
AVS (Air Velocity Sensor)	14
COVS (CO and Visibility Sensor)	12
Overhead Vehicle Detector	3
FDS (Flood Detection Sensor Set)	5
Fire Box	150
E.C.N., E.C.N.s and Hydrant Niches Fire Rated Doors	98
Adits and Cross Passages Fire Rated Doors	19

== Route ==
From North to South
Sadr Bridge
Jalal-e-Ale Ahmad Expressway
Sadr Expressway
Kordestan Expressway
Ayatollah Hashemi Rafsanjani Expressway
From South to North
