= Bagheri Expressway =

Expressway in Tehran, Iran

Bagheri Expressway
- بزرگراه باقري
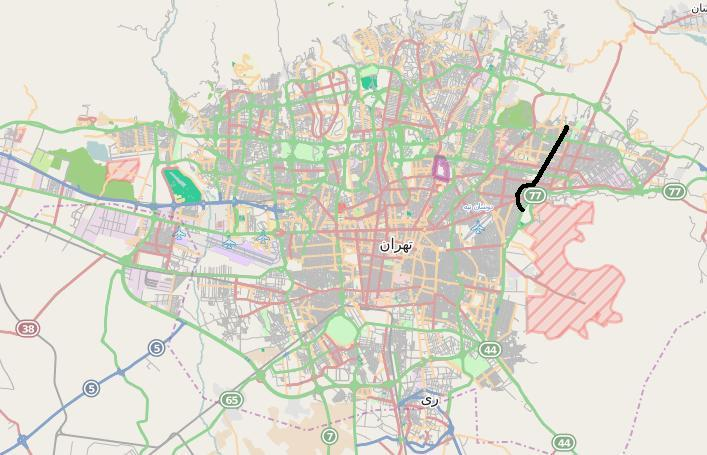

Route information
- Length: 6.6 km (4.1 mi)

Major junctions
- North end: Esteghlal Boulevard
- South end: Yasini Expressway

Location
- Country: Iran
- Major cities: Tehran

Highway system
- Highways in Iran; Freeways

Bagheri Expressway is an expressway in eastern Tehran in Tehranpars neighborhood. It connects East to Northeast.

From North to south
Babayi Expressway
Esteghlal Boulevard
U-Turn
Zeinoddin Expressway
U-Turn
196th Street
U-Turn
Farjam Street
U-Turn
Resalat Expressway
U-Turn
Golbarg Street
U-Turn
Damavand Street; Shahid Sani Street
Yasini Expressway
From South to North
