= Human trafficking in Iran =

Human trafficking in Iran is the phenomenon of human trafficking in Iran for the purposes of sexual exploitation or involuntary servitude.

In 2008 the Iranian government prohibited all forms of trafficking in persons through its 2004 Law on Combating Human Trafficking, which prescribes severe penalties, often including death sentences for convicted traffickers.

According to the U. S., the Government of Iran did not comply with the minimum standards for the elimination of trafficking and did not make significant efforts to do so. Lack of access to Iran by U.S. Government officials prohibited the collection of full data on the country's human trafficking problem and the government's efforts to curb it. Iran did not provided evidence of law enforcement activities against trafficking to the US government.

In 2023, the Organised Crime Index gave the country a score of 8 out of 10 for human trafficking, noting that the country was a main traffic route for women being moved from Asia to Europe.

As of mid-2024, Iran has not ratified the 2000 UN TIP Protocol.

== U.S. State Department report ==
The U.S. State Department's Office to Monitor and Combat Trafficking in Persons placed the country in "Tier 3" in 2017. According to the report, "Iranian girls aged 13 to 17 are targets of human trafficking gangs that are forcibly transmitted for sale and sexual services outside of Iran." The report also mentioned the trafficking of human beings to Iranian girls who had houses in Kurdistan, Iraq, especially in Sulaimaniyah, for sex trade, and some had been taken there by smugglers.

The report also noted that Iranian authorities and the Revolutionary Guards forced Afghan refugees to fight in Syria and Iraq, and that Iran had become the source and destination of men, women, and children exposed to trafficking in women and forced labor over the past five years.

The 2023 U.S State Department report noted that Iran was one of eleven countries which were seen as having a documented government policy or pattern of human trafficking.

== Iranian government reports ==
According to a report from the National Security Police of the Tehran Grand Command, as well as reports from the Center of Women's Affairs and the Committee of the Organization for the Defense of Victims of Violence in 2003, the smuggling of border women and girls to the Persian Gulf Arab states, Pakistan, Afghanistan, and Europe has expanded. Smugglers transmitted their victims from Afghanistan, Pakistan, and the Philippines to Iran and then sent them to Europe. In 2003, the number of gangs detected and defused in the West Azerbaijan Province reached to 200.

In this regard, Ali Sadeghi, the head of the Immigration Police and the Iranian government's police law enforcement passport, admitted in February 2013 that Iranian girls were being trafficked to the Arab states of the southern margin of the Persian Gulf. At the same time, Ismail Ahmadi Moghaddam, commander of the country's police forces, said that the main destination is human trafficking from Iran, European countries, Australia and Canada. On the other hand, every year in Iran, the situation of children is worse and the age of prostitution is lower.

== See also ==
- Prostitution in Iran
