= Sohrevardi Street =

Street in Tehran, Iran

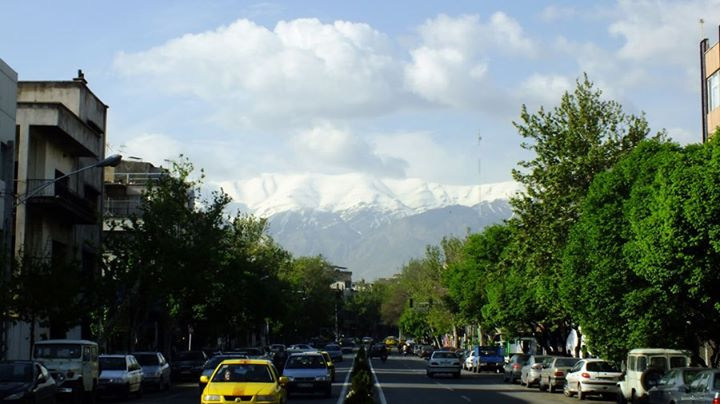
Sohrevardi Street in 2012

Sohrevardi street (Persian: خیابان سهروردی), formerly known as Farah Street (خیابان فرح), is a street in Tehran, Iran. It begins at Qasem Soleimani Expressway and ends at Bahar Shiraz street.
