= Shahrbanou Amani =

Iranian politician

Shahrbanou Amani is a former MP of the Fifth and Sixth Parliament of Iran and a reformist. According to the Green Path Movement Site, she was arrested on February 13, 2011. During the previous Presidential election, Amani harshly criticized the censorship imposed on media. Also, according to this same site, Amani had allegedly signed letters requesting permits for demonstrations following the disputed presidential elections.

During and after her time in Parliament, Amani was a staunch supporter of women’s rights. She had criticized the "Family Support Bill," which sought to ease restrictions on the practice of polygamy by men. She was an MP representing the people of Urumieh, and before her arrest, she worked at the State Welfare Organization. Amani also advocated and supported the One Million Signatures Campaign and its aims.
