= Haraz Road =

Road in Iran

Road 77
- جاده 77
- Haraz Road
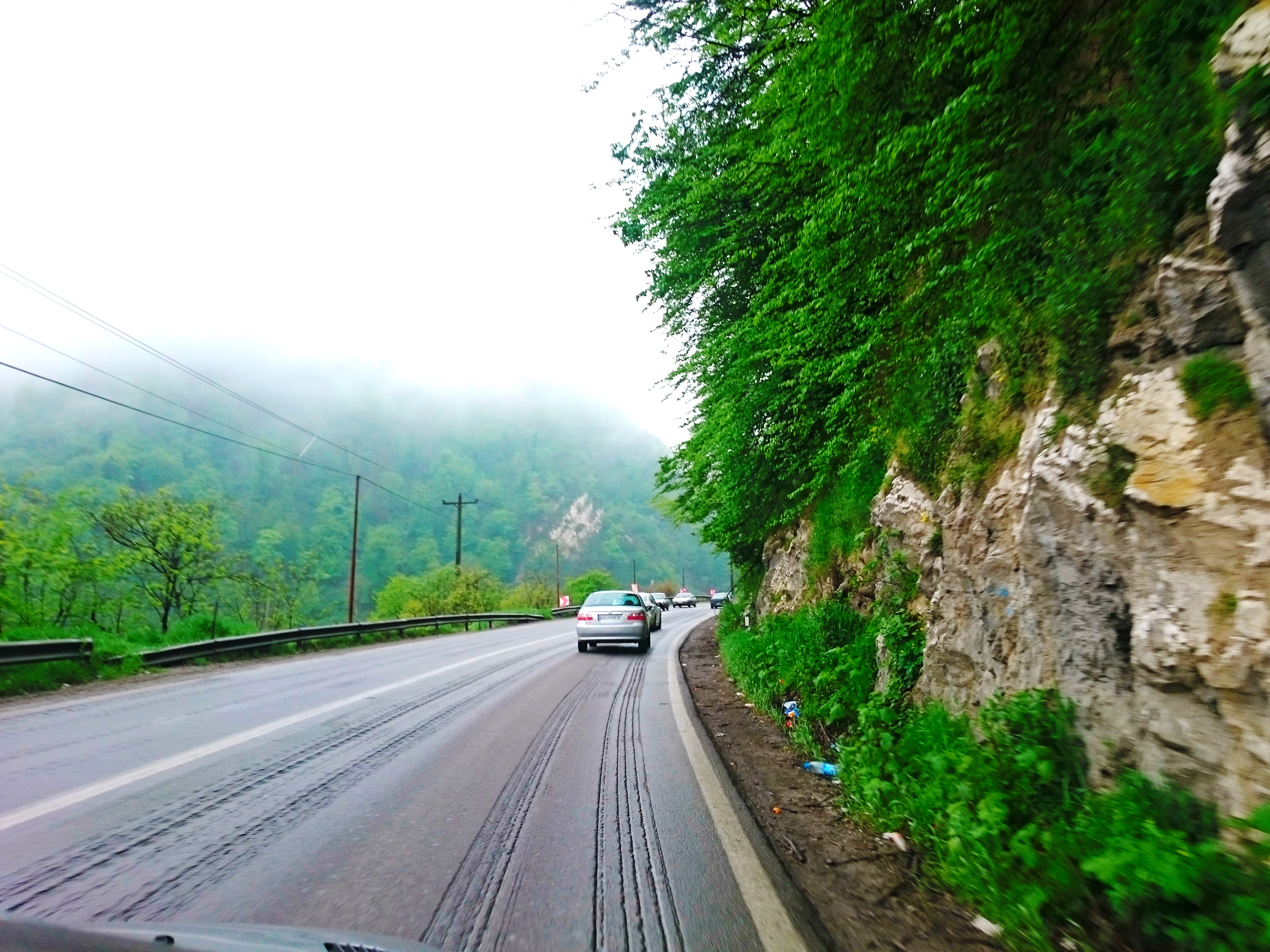

Route information
- Length: 158 km (98 mi)

Major junctions
- From: Tehran, Tehran Province; Yasini Expressway; Zeinoddin Expressway; Damavanad Street; Telo Road
- Babayi Expressway; Road 79
- To: Mahmood Abad, Mazandaran Province; Road 22

Location
- Country: Iran
- Provinces: Tehran, Mazandaran
- Major cities: Rudehen, Tehran Province; Amol, Mazandaran Province

Highway system
- Highways in Iran; Freeways

Haraz Road (Persian: جادهٔ هراز) also known as the Road 77, is a mountainous highway from Tehran, Iran to the shoreline of Caspian Sea in Mazandaran.

== Route ==
The road's route travels through Tehran Province and Mazandaran Province. It crosses the Alborz mountain range and then descends northwards down the valley of Haraz River. The road is the shortest route from Tehran to the north ( 180 km). It passes through the towns of Amol and Rudehen.

== Features ==
Haraz Road is the nearest road to Mount Damavand. Lar Dam, Lar National Park, which Mount Damavand is within, is accessible from there. Shekl-e Shah (rock relief from the 19th century) is in the middle of the road, near Vana.

== Gallery ==
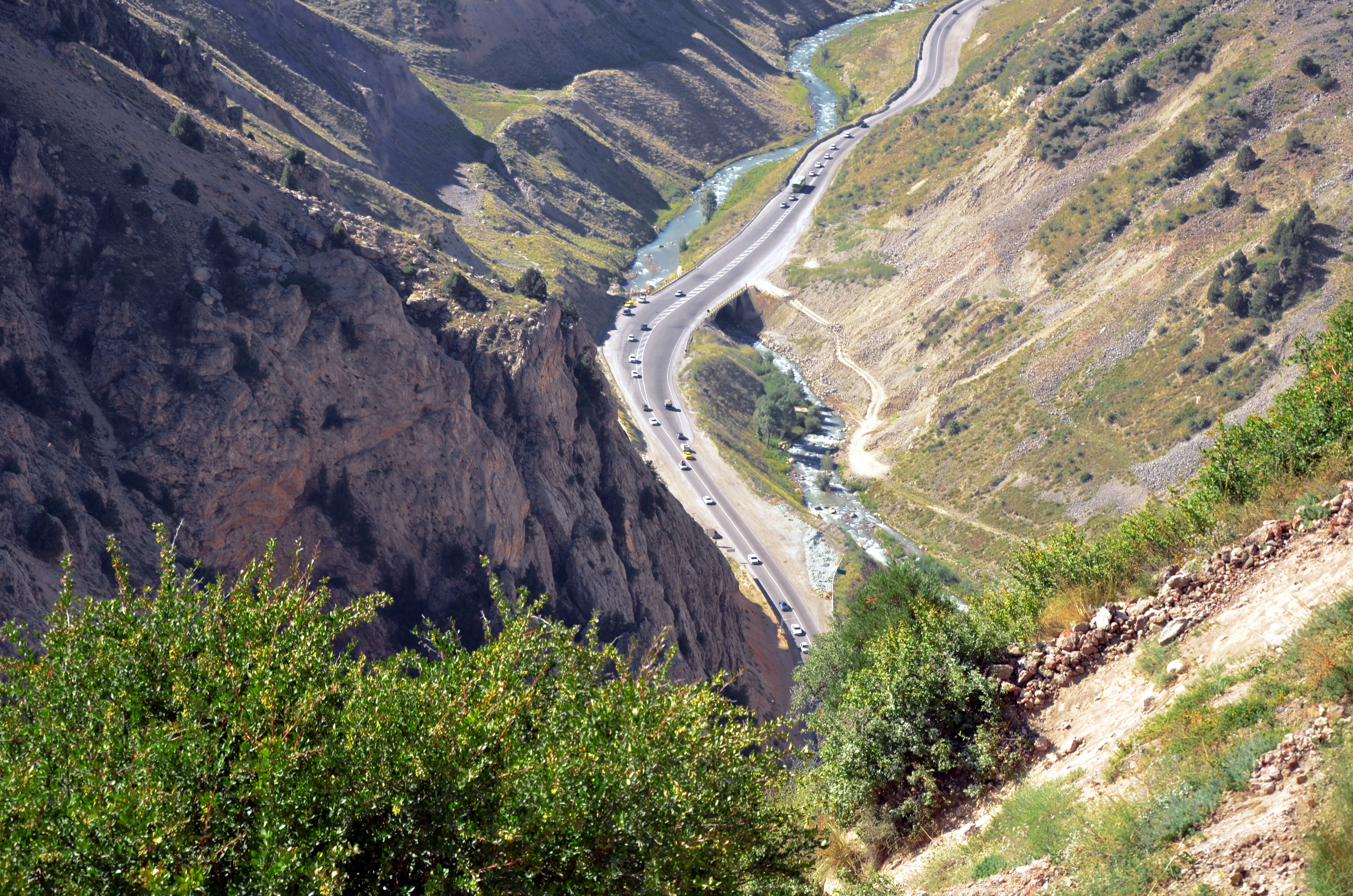
Road view from above

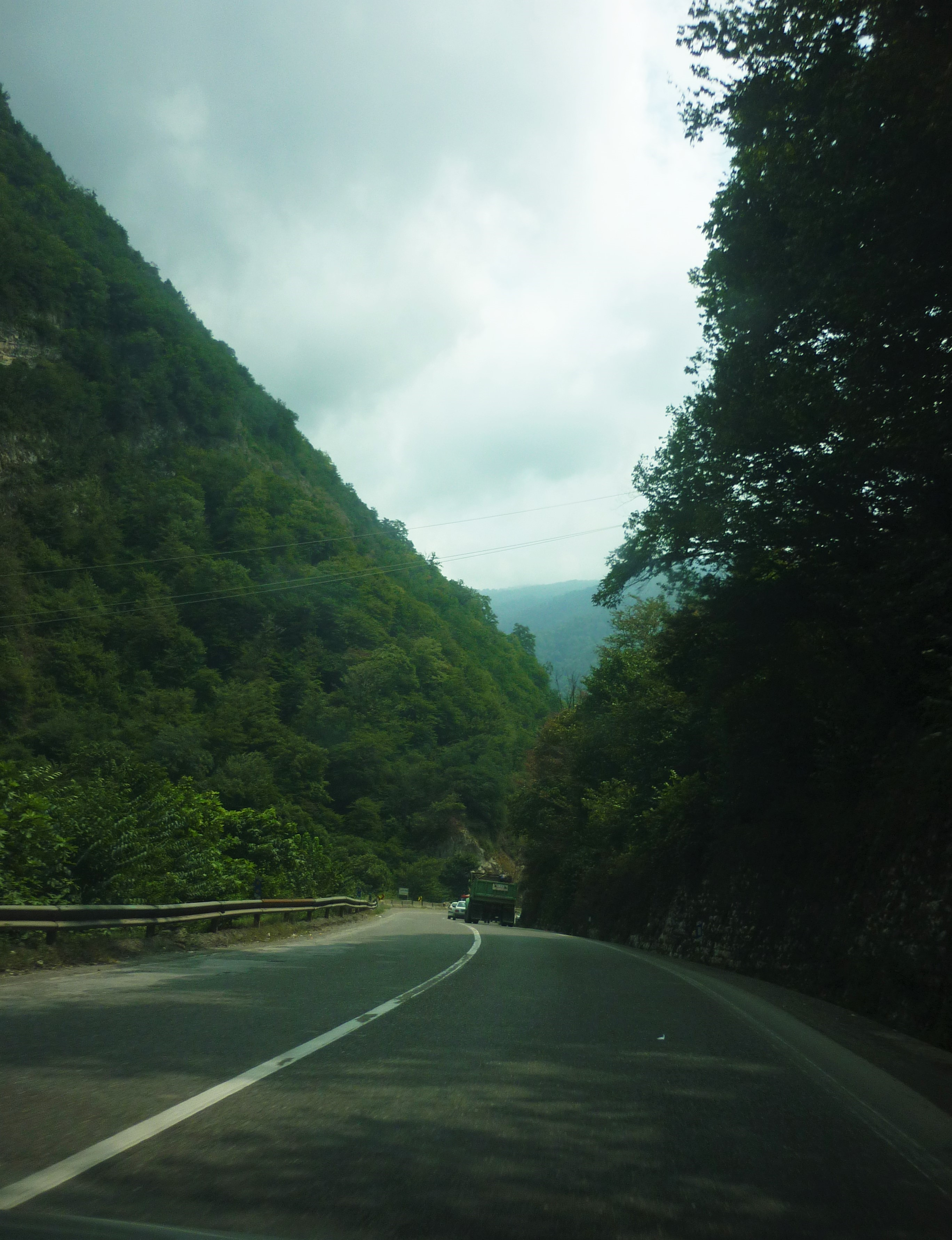
Initial view of the north

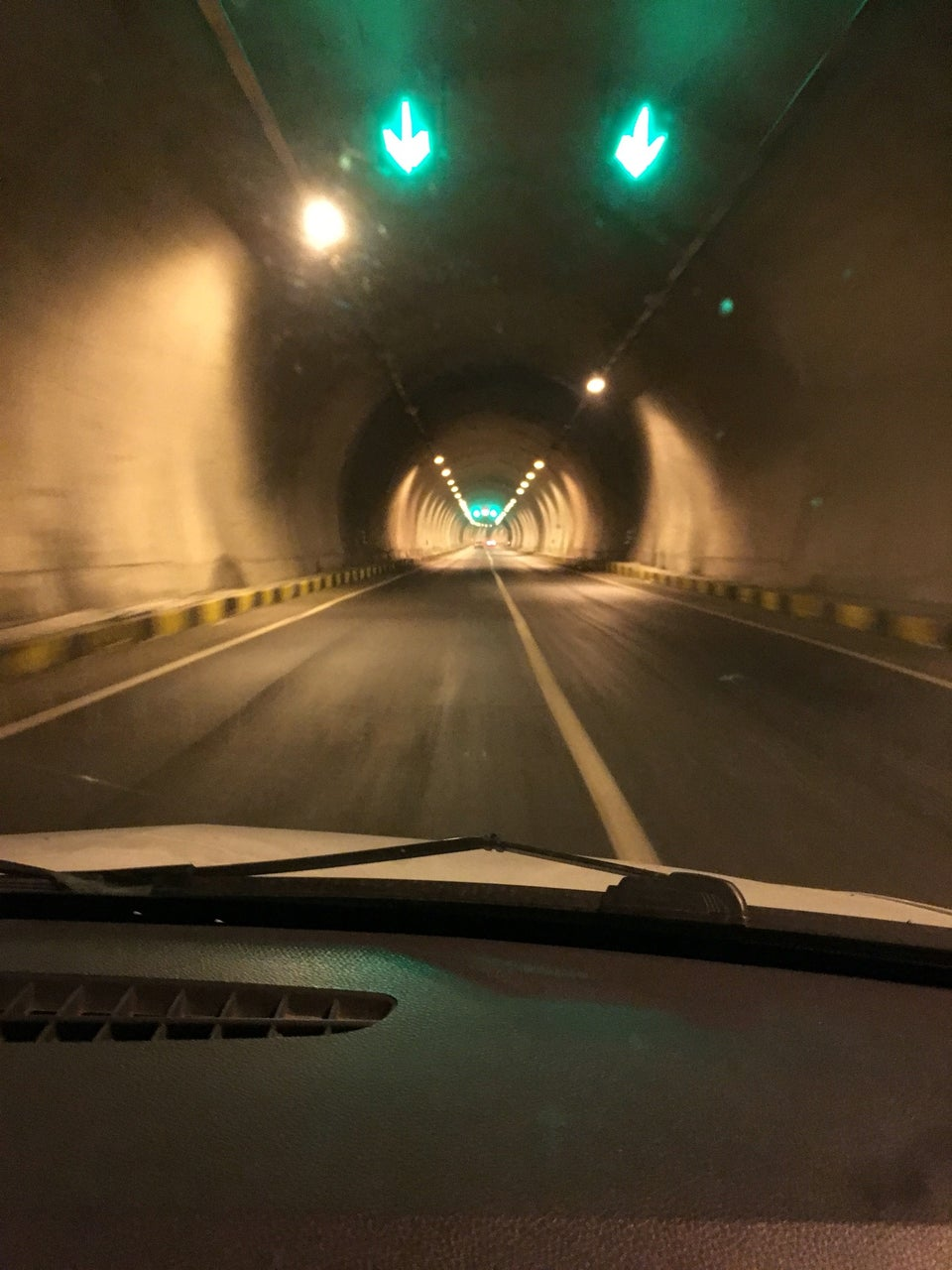
Haraz road Tunnel

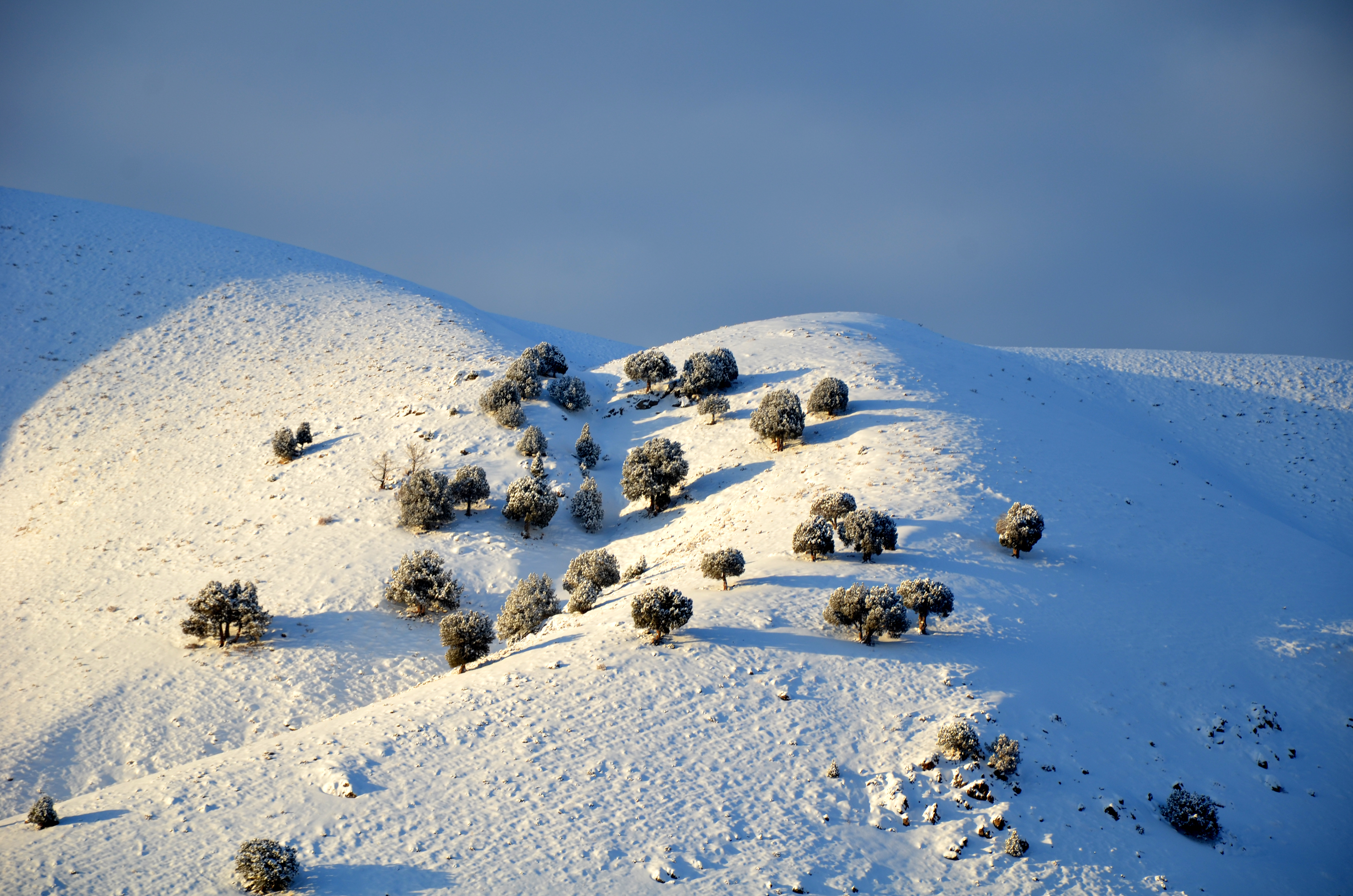
Snow in Mosha village on Haraz road

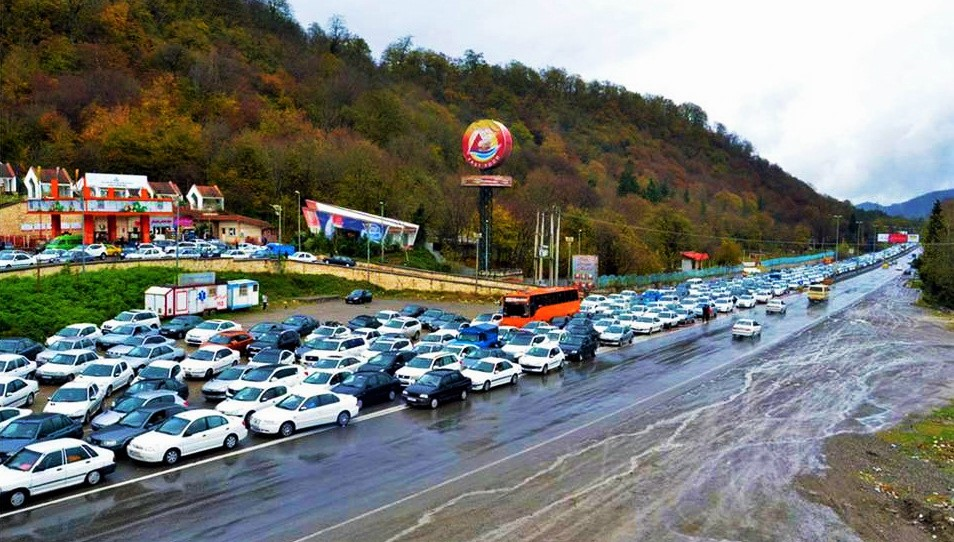
Traffic in Narenjestan area, Haraz road Amol

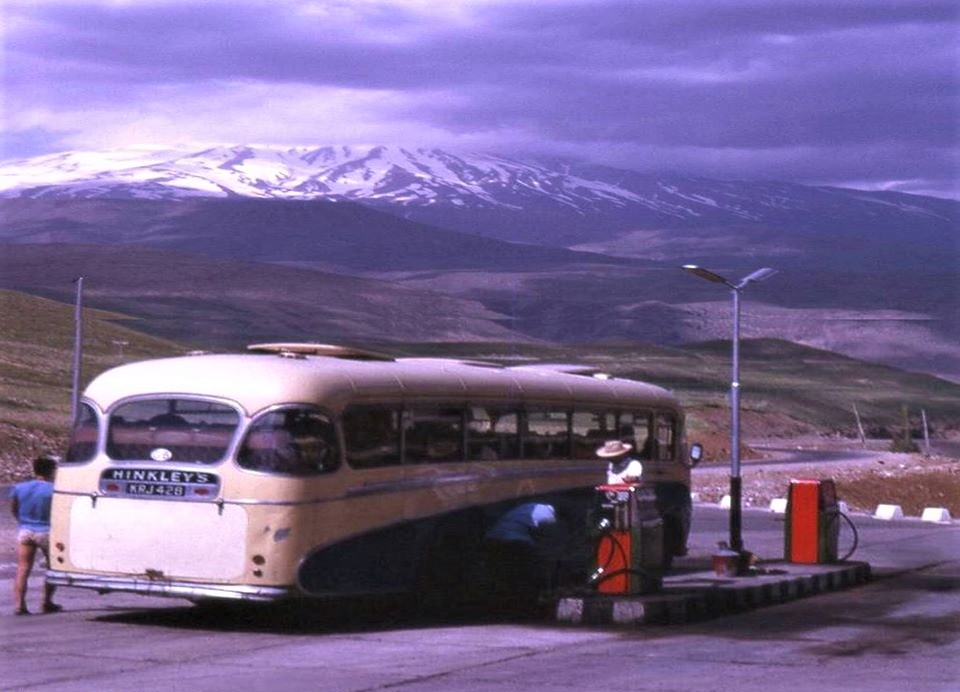
American tourists on Haraz road, Polur Amol

== See also ==
- Road 59 − Karaj-Chaloos Road — another main Tehran−Caspian route.
- Alborz (Elburz) mountain range topics
