= Basij Expressway =

Road in Tehran, Iran

Basij Expressway
- بزرگراه بسیج
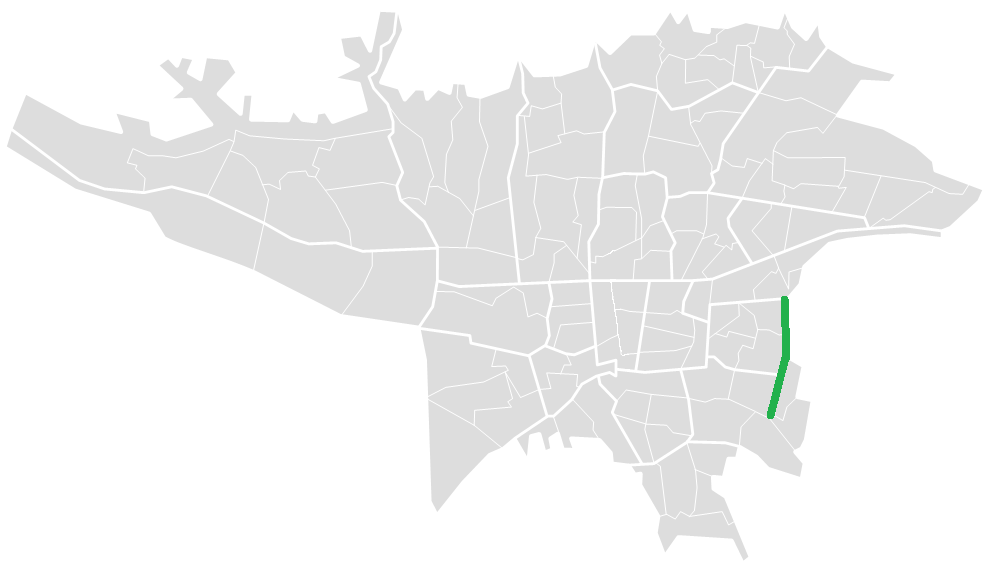

Route information
- Length: 6.4 km (4.0 mi)

Major junctions
- North end: Doran Expressway; Piruzi Street; Si Metri Niru-ye Havaei Street
- South end: Basij Interchange; Azadegan Expressway; Imam Reza Expressway; Khavaran Street

Location
- Country: Iran
- Major cities: Tehran

Highway system
- Highways in Iran; Freeways

Basij Expressway (Persian: بزرگراه بسيج) is Tehran eastern ringway. It is from Kolahduz Square in the east to Tehran-Mashhad Highway in the southeast and Azadegan Expressway (Southern Ringway).

From North to South
| Kolahduz Square | Doran Expressway; Piruzi Street; Si Metri Niru-ye Havaei Street |
| | Hejrat Expressway |
| | A'emme-ye Athar Street |
Tehran BRT Line A'emme-ye Athar Station
Tehran BRT Line Qasr-e Firuzeh Station
| | Mahallati Expressway |
Tehran BRT Line Mahallati Station
Tehran BRT Line Zam-Zam Station
| | Zam-Zam Street |
U-Turn
| | Ahang Expressway |
Tehran BRT Line 20om-e Afsariyeh Station
| | 35 Metri Valiasr Street |
Tehran BRT Line 35 Metri Valiasr Station
Tehran BRT Line 8om-e Afsariyeh Station
Tehran BRT Line Basij Station
Tehran BRT Line Ahang Station
| Basij Interchange | Azadegan Expressway; Imam Reza Expressway; Khavaran Street |
From South to North
