= Yasini Expressway =

Expressway in Tehran, Iran

Shahid Yasini Expressway
- بزرگراه شهید یاسینی
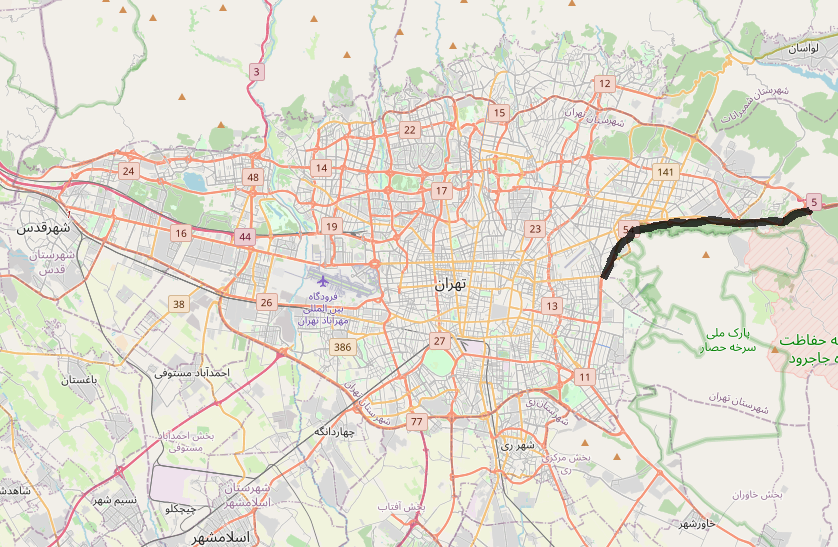

Route information
- Length: 6 km (3.7 mi)

Major junctions
- East end: Tehran-Damavand Highway; Zeinoddin Expressway; Telo Road; Damavand Street
- West end: Basij Expressway; Damavand Street

Location
- Country: Iran
- Major cities: Tehran

Highway system
- Highways in Iran; Freeways

Shahid Sarlashkar Yasini Expressway (Persian: بزرگراه شهید سرلشکر یاسینی) is a new expressway in Tehran. It runs along Tehran-Damavand Highway to reduce traffic in the highway.

From North to south
Tehran-Damavand Highway; Zeinoddin Expressway; Telo Road; Damavand Street
Resalat Expressway
Basij Expressway; Damavand Street
From South to North
