= Prostitution in Iran =

Prostitution is illegal in Iran, and incurs various punishments ranging from fines and jail terms to execution for repeat offenders.

The exact number of prostitutes working in Iran is unknown, but in 2017 it was estimated that there were 228,700 prostitutes in Iran and that the number was on the rise.

== History ==
Historically, prostitution in Persia was connected to the history of slavery in Iran. Since the principle of concubinage in Islam in Islamic Law allowed a man to have intercourse with his female slave, prostitution was practiced by a pimp selling his female slave on the slave market to a client, who was allowed to have intercourse with her as her new owner, and who after intercourse returned his ownership of her to her pimp on the pretext of discontent, which was a legal and accepted method for prostitution in the Islamic world. During the reign of Nassredin Shah (r. 1848–1896), Vali Khan described female prostitutes, termed favahesh, and male prostitutes called amrads. Brothels are mentioned but it was more common for prostitutes to meet clients on an individual basis, and male prostitutes often met their male clients in coffee houses and bath houses, and were sometimes supported in a permanent basis by a client. Brothels were sometimes accepted and taxed by the authorities; brothels for male prostitutes were called amrad khaneh.

In the 1920s, Reza Shah (r. 1925–1941) confined prostitution to separate neighborhoods, such as Shahr-e No in Tehran, a system which remained until the Iranian Revolution in 1979.

=== After 1979 revolution ===
The new religious government demolished the prostitution district and punished prostitution with lashing. Establishing brothels is also a criminal act, subject to 1–10 years imprisonment, if not subject to death sentence.

From the 1990s, Dubai became famous in the United Arab Emirates as a place for the sex trade of Iranian women, but it was from the late 2000s that other countries neighboring Iran, including Turkey, Georgia, and Iraqi Kurdistan, had a high number of Iranian female prostitutes hosted. After this, Iranian women quickly became more popular throughout the region for prostitution. The income of Iranian prostitutes in neighboring countries is considered high but risky.

In 2002, the moderate Iranian newspaper Entekhab estimated that there were close to 85,000 prostitutes in Tehran alone. Prostitution is rampant in Tehran; "the streets are full of working girls ... part of the landscape, blending in with everything else."

In 2008, General Reza Zarei, the Tehran police chief, was arrested in a brothel with six prostitutes. His arrest caused embarrassment for the government of President Ahmadinejad because Zarei was in charge of vice in Tehran. The prosecutor in the case remarked that Zarei exploited his office to profit materially from prostitution.

According to Farahnaz Salimi, head of Aaftaab Society, an NGO for social damages controlling and prevention, there are about 10,000 female sex workers in Tehran. Among these sex workers, there are married women or female clerks, too. According to her reports, the average price of having sex with sex workers is 600,000 rials (60,000 tomans which is about US$14.28). The price can be as high as some hundred thousand tomans (= some million rials) for a night. The lowest price is 50,000 rials (= 5,000 tomans). (Price information is based on currency exchange rates of spring 2016).

Another report in 2021, said prostitution in Iran became more widespread using the Internet and some websites listed millions of women from all over Iran.

== Leading Causes ==
Prostitution in Iran is exacerbated by multiple causes.

Economic Hardship

Sanctions and expansionary monetary policy from excessive government borrowing, has caused Iran to exist in a near-constant cycle of hyperinflation since the 1979 revolution. Essential goods like food are especially affected by the inflation. One of the leading causes for someone to enter prostitution is poverty and lack of opportunity in other forms of work. In particular, women in Iran face a lack of employment opportunities with Iran ranking 145th out of 148 countries in the 2025 Global Gender Gap Index.

Familial Dependence

Because of the lack of career opportunities for women, many young women in Iran are dependent on their families for basic needs like housing and food. Once they age, they are expected to marry and leave the familial support system to be supported by their husbands. Economic gender inequality reduces opportunities for women to work and earn a wage. The state also has a lack of legal institutions protecting women and providing aid to women who do not fit into these spaces. Never-married women, divorcees, and widows struggle to find opportunity to be stable beyond securing a husband. According to the 2021 study "Exploring the reasons for women to engage in sex work in Tehran, Iran: A qualitative study", family instability is the most common reason for women to enter into sex work. The family instability in question includes abuse from family members and the absence of a head of household.

Sex Trafficking

Trafficking networks target youth in Iran and sell girls abroad to the rest of Asia, Europe, and neighboring countries. The victims are often coerced or kidnapped through various means and forced into sexual slavery. The Iranian government frequently disregards sex trafficking and criminalizes victims for prostitution or immigration violations, creating a systematic lack of reporting by victims. Afghan refugees are particularly vulnerable to sex trafficking through Iran.

In 2007, the United States State Department placed Iran as a "Tier 2" in its annual Trafficking in Persons reports, stating that "it does not fully comply with the minimum standards for the elimination of trafficking but is making significant efforts to do so". In 2010, U.S. Secretary of State Hillary Clinton downgraded Iran to "Tier 3", noting that the country makes no significant effort to solve trafficking problems, mainly in relation to prostitution and forced labor. As of 2025, Iran remains at this level.

== Nikah mut'ah or Sigheh ==
While prostitution is illegal in Iran, the institution of Nikah mut'ah (temporary marriage, usually called Sigheh in Iran) allows contractual short-term relations between the sexes. Usually, a dowry is given to the temporary wife. Sigheh can last from 3 days to 99 years, though some Ulama say that it is impossible to marry a person, as temporary marriage, for a period of time that is longer than the average life-time of a person. The contract expires automatically without divorce once the agreed contracted time has come.

Several scholars have argued that temporary marriage is misused in practice as a legal cover for prostitution in Iran with the dowry acting as compensation for short-term sexual relationships. This view holds that the formal structure of Nikah mut'ah contracts can be exploited to provide religious and legal legitimacy to transactional sexual arrangements that would otherwise be considered prostitution under Iranian law. This criticism predominantly comes from both Sunni scholars and secular Iranian classes before the 1979 revolution.

Other scholars, especially within Twelver Shi'ism, contest this description, maintaining that Nikah mut'ah is distinct from prostitution. Proponents of this position point to the requirement of iddah as a structural constraint that limits the frequency with which such contracts can be concluded, and therefore distinguishes the practice from commercial sex work.

A third position holds that Nikah mut'ah is not itself the root of the problem but may, in certain contexts, function as an imperfect solution, offering a degree of legal recognition and social protection to economically marginalized women who might otherwise have little protection within Iran's formal legal framework. Some feminist scholars argue that the practice could reduce stigmas surrounding sexuality in Iran while others acknowledge the potential to lead women into abusive situations such as sex trafficking. Nikah mut'ah can also allow for a non-sexual clause, unlike traditional Nikah, for ulterior uses such as relaxing veiling requirements around mahram and male-female coworker interaction.

== Healthcare ==
The "Youthful Population and Protection of Family" law, enacted in 2021, restricted access to contraception and reproductive healthcare. Notably, Article 51 states, "Regarding contraceptives, the free distribution or financing of contraceptive-related items, the implantation of contraceptive devices, or encouragement to use them is forbidden in medical centres affiliated to medical universities. Furthermore, the sale of contraceptives in pharmacies and medical centres across the country, as well as the placement of contraceptives, is subject to a doctor's prescription." This law and others similar are part of the government's family planning initiative to raise TFR and achieve rapid population growth having previously limited population growth in response to economic strain. The restriction of contraceptives limits access to safe sex for Iranians, especially impacting sex workers that depend on free sexual healthcare to limit unwanted pregnancies and STIs.

On 15 July 2016, Ali Akbar Sayyari, the healthcare affairs' Deputy Minister of the Ministry of Health and Medical Education of Iran, informed the public about improving and/or establishing (depending on the area and place in the country) 'drop-in centers' and 'voluntary counseling and testing' centers for the female sex workers. These centers provide disease prevention tools and examine the sex workers for STDs. They also provide counselling.

== In art and culture ==
Tehran Taboo, and a number of new works pictured the prostitution in Iran.

The novel "Parrot" written by Zakaria Hashemi, the series of photos by Kaveh Golestan and the movie "Castle" by Kamran Shirdel also mentioned and pictured the prostitution in the country.

== See also ==
- Chastity House
- Crime in Iran
- Healthcare in Iran
- Human Trafficking in Iran
- Prostitution in Asia
- Saeed Hanaei
