= The Ayatollah Begs to Differ =

The Ayatollah Begs to Differ: The Paradox of Modern Iran is a 2008 non-fiction book by Hooman Majd, published by Doubleday Publishers.

A paperback version with a preface referring to 2009 Iranian presidential election was released in 2009.

Writer Steve Coll stated that the book "seems—from a very wry distance—to identify with [ reformists aligned with Mohamed Khatami's] views of Iran’s place in the world."

Kevin R. Long of The Plain Dealer described the book as "enlightening".

Publishers Weekly gave a starred review, stating that it is "a remarkable ride through" the subject matter and that it is "critical but affectionate"; the review stated that there is not sufficient inclusion of "women's voices" and that the author "seems to gloss too quickly over realities that don't engage his interest".
