= Hooman Majd =

American-Iranian writer (born 1957)

- Born: 1957 (age 68–69); Tehran, Imperial State of Iran
- Education: St Paul's School, London, George Washington University
- Occupations: Writer, journalist, political commentator
- Relatives: Shusha Guppy (aunt), Darius Guppy (cousin), Ayatollah Mohammad Kazem Assar (maternal grandfather)
- Website: Hooman Majd

Hooman Majd (born 1957) is an Iranian-born American journalist, author, and political commentator focused on Iranian affairs. He is based in New York City.

Born into a family involved in the diplomatic service under Shah Mohammad Reza Pahlavi, Majd has published several non-fiction books on modern Iran, including The Ayatollah Begs to Differ and The Ayatollahs' Democracy. He is also notable for having served as an advisor and translator for Iranian Presidents Mohammad Khatami and Mahmoud Ahmadinejad during their visits to the United Nations.

== Early life ==
Hooman Majd was born in 1957 in Tehran, Iran. He was raised in a family involved in the diplomatic service, serving under the Shah Mohammad Reza Pahlavi. Majd lived from infancy abroad, mostly in the United States and in England, but attending American schools in varied places, such as Tunis and New Delhi.

He boarded at St Paul's School, London until 1974. He later attended George Washington University in Washington, D.C., where he studied electrical engineering and graduated in 1977. He then studied operations research at GWU for two more years but did not complete the program. He stayed in the United States after the 1979 revolution.

=== Extended family ===
Majd's maternal grandfather was the Ayatollah Mohammad Kazem Assar (1885–1975), who was born to an Iraqi mother and an Iranian father. The Ayatollah, along with other contemporary ulema, overcame traditional opposition to serve as a professor of philosophy at the University of Tehran. His own father, whose origins were in the village of Ardakan, Iran, became representative of a "middle class" that was "pro-democratic and pro-modernization".

Majd's aunt is musician Shusha Guppy, and his cousin is convicted fraudster Darius Guppy.

== Career ==
He has published three non-fiction books in the United States and in the United Kingdom, which have been translated into a number of other languages, including The Ayatollah Begs to Differ: The Paradox of Modern Iran (New York: Doubleday, 2008); The Ayatollahs' Democracy: An Iranian Challenge (New York: W.W. Norton, 2010); and The Ministry of Guidance Invites You to Not Stay: An American Family in Iran (New York: Doubleday, 2013). He has also published short fiction in collections and in The American Scholar and Guernica.

Majd has also served as an advisor and translator for President Mohammad Khatami, and translator for President Mahmoud Ahmadinejad on their trips to the United States and to the United Nations, and he has written about those experiences.

== Political views ==
Roland Elliott Brown writing in The Observer in 2012 described Majd as espousing a "mild reformist agenda" and characterized him as "a sometimes sympathetic communicator of the regime's positions." In the same review, Brown wrote that Majd describes the Iranian administration as "increasingly fascistic," while also characterizing it as flawed but popular and a defender of national sovereignty.

According to Newsweek, has described Iranian society as one in which clerics publicly criticize each other and younger generations challenge social restrictions. The magazine also noted that although Majd expressed admiration for reformist president Mohammad Khatami, he later served as translator for Mahmoud Ahmadinejad during visits to New York.

Following the 2009 election in Iran, he "conceded [...] fielded only regime-vetted candidates and was stolen".

== Twitter controversies ==
In July 2012, a vulgar tweet from Majd's Twitter account targeted Iranian-born human rights advocate Nazanin Afshin-Jam. Majd later stated that his account had been hacked and denied writing the message.

== Publications ==
- Majd, Hooman (2008). The Ayatollah Begs to Differ: The Paradox of Modern Iran. Doubleday Books. ISBN 9780385523349.
- Majd, Hooman (2010). The Ayatollahs' Democracy: An Iranian Challenge. W. W. Norton Company. ISBN 9780393072594.
- Majd, Hooman (2013). The Ministry of Guidance Invites You to Not Stay: An American Family in Iran. New York City, NY: Doubleday. ISBN 9780385535328.
