= Sayyad Expressway =

Expressway in Tehran, Iran

Sayyad Shirazi Expressway
- بزرگراه صیاد شیرازی
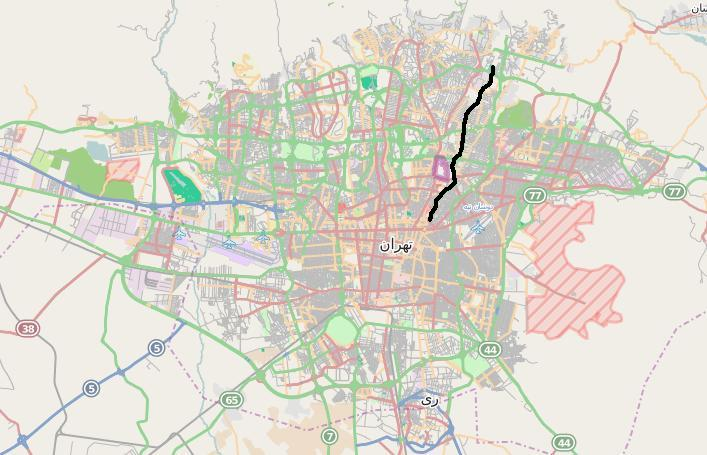

Route information
- Length: 10.7 km (6.6 mi)

Major junctions
- North end: Babayi Expressway
- South end: Sepah Square

Location
- Country: Iran
- Major cities: Tehran

Highway system
- Highways in Iran; Freeways

Sayyad Expressway is an expressway in Tehran. It starts from Babayi Expressway and ends in Sabalan Street.

It is named after the assassinated Ali Sayad Shirazi, chief-of-staff of the Iranian Armed Forces during the eight-year Iran–Iraq war.

From North to south
	Babayi Expressway
	Moghan Street
U-Turn
	Shahid Mousavi Street
	Gilan Street
	Zeinoddin Expressway Shahid Zeyn-o-ddin Metro Station
Shahid Sayyad Shirazi Interchange	Resalat Expressway; Khajeh Abdollah Ansari Street Khajeh Abdollah-e Ansari Metro Station
	Masil-e Bakhtar Boulevard Shahid Sayyad-e Shirazi Metro Station
	Qoddusi Street; Janbazan Street; Ostad Hasan Bana Street
	Sabalan Street North
	Police Street
Sepah Square	Khaje Nasir Street; Tusi Street; Sepah Street
From South to North
