= Imam Ali Expressway =

Road in Tehran, Iran

Imam Ali Expressway

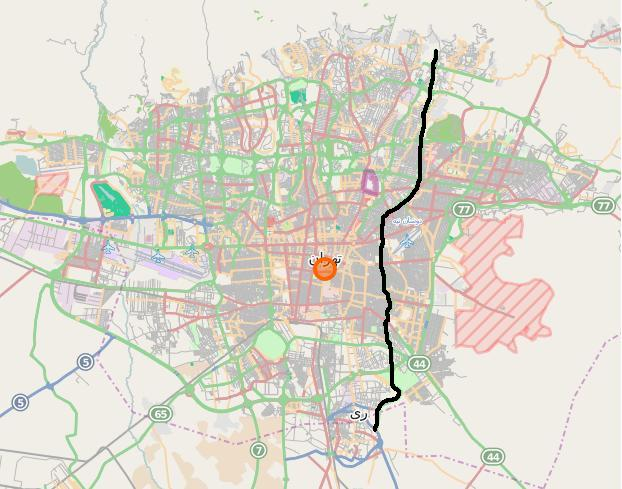

Route information
- Length: 35 km (22 mi)

Major junctions
- North end: Artesh Expressway
- South end: Avini Expressway

Location
- Country: Iran
- Major cities: Tehran

Highway system
- Highways in Iran; Freeways

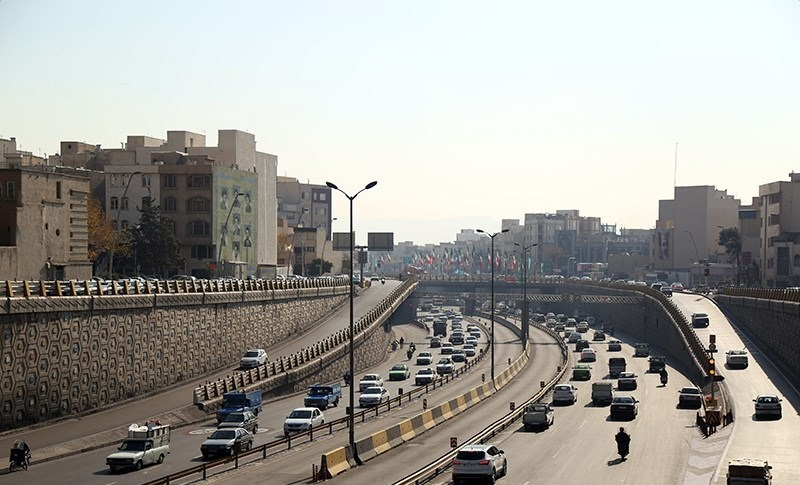
Imam Ali Highway near Piroozi St

Imam Ali Expressway is an expressway in eastern Tehran. It is from Darabad to Ray. This highway links the northernmost point of Tehran to the southernmost site, it cuts off east-west highways and streets, and this makes it easier to access other parts of Tehran. Imam Ali highway plays a role as a communication link among many main arteries of the city.
