= Tehran Metro Line 3 =

Metro line in Tehran, Iran

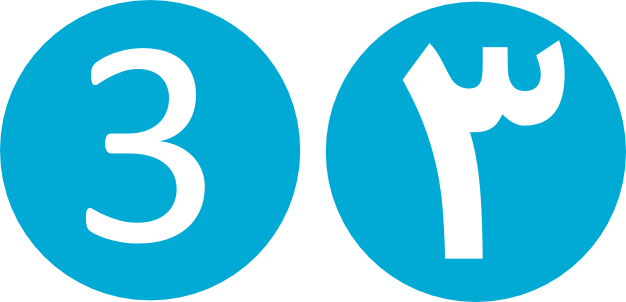

Overview
- Native name: خط ۳ مترو تهران
- Owner: Tehran Urban and Suburban Railways Organization (Metro)
- Locale: Tehran, Tehran Province
- Termini: Ghaem Station; Azadegan Station
- Stations: 25

Service
- Type: Rapid transit
- System: Tehran Metro
- Operator(s): Tehran Urban and Suburban Railways Organization (Metro)
- Depot(s): Azadegan Depot

History
- Opened: 16 December 2012; 13 years ago
- Last extension: 2015

Technical
- Line length: 37 km (23 mi)
- Track gauge: 1,435 mm (4 ft 8 1/2 in)
- Electrification: Third rail
Route map
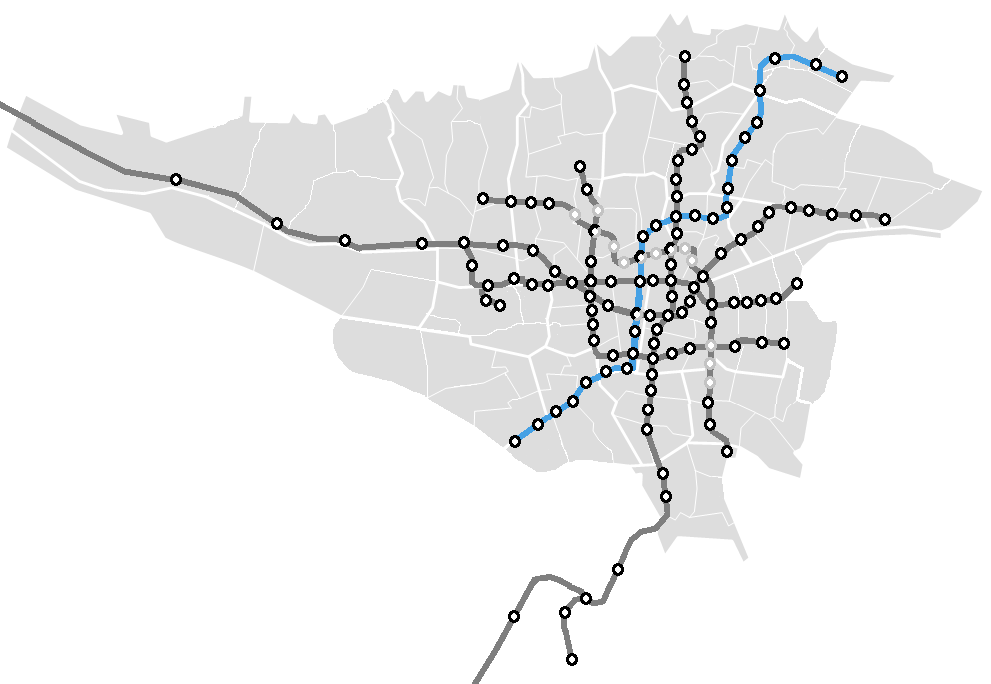

Tehran Metro Line 3 travels from northeast to southwest. Line 3 is one of the most important lines as it connects southwest Tehran to northeast, crosses busy parts of the capital city, and can help to alleviate traffic problems. About 7 kilometers (4.3 mi) of Line 3 became operational in December 2012, followed by 12 kilometers (7.5 mi) in April 2014, and finally, the last section of the line which is 18 kilometers (11 mi) opened on 22 September 2015, increasing the length of the line to a total of 37 kilometers (23 mi).

== Route ==
The line starts from northeastern Tehran at Shahrak-e Qa'em going westward parallel to but 300 m north of Artesh Expressway, passing through Aghdasieh neighbourhood. Then, it turns south at the end of Artesh Expressway going to Nobonyad Square. It then turns towards Sayyad Expressway and runs southward along it for about 5.6 kilometers (3.5 mi). At Sabalan square, it then turns west, going under Beheshti Street, intersecting with Line 1 at Shahid Beheshti Station. It then turns towards south, going under Valiasr Street for 7.7 kilometers (4.8 mi), until it reaches Rahahan Square, providing access to Tehran railway station. It then turns towards southwest, passing through Javadiyeh and then going along Cheraghi Expressway and Saidi Expressway. The line then terminates at Azadegan Station at the intersection of Saidi Expressway with Azadegan Expressway.
