= Ghaem Metro Station =

Metro station

Ghaem Metro Station ایستگاه مترو قائم

General information
- Location: Shahrak-e Qa'em 1st Square, Shahrak-e Qa'em, District 1, Tehran, Shemiranat County; Tehran Province, Iran
- Coordinates: 35°47′58″N 51°31′18″E
- System: Tehran Metro Station
- Operator: Tehran Urban and Suburban Railways Organization (Metro)
- Connections: Tehran Buses: 298 Tajrish Term.-Shahrak-e Qa'em

History
- Opened: 31 Shahrivar 1394 H-Kh (22 September 2015)

Services
Preceding station	Tehran Metro	Following station
Terminus	Line 3	Shahid Mahallati towards Azadegan
Location

Ghaem Metro Station is a station in line 3 of the Tehran Metro. It is located at Shahrak-e Qa'em in Northeastern Tehran. Ghaem Station is the Northeastern terminus of Tehran's line 3.

The station is located in the proximity of Islamic Azad University, Central Tehran Branch - Velayat Campus.
