= Azadegan Metro Station =

Station of the Tehran Metro

Azadegan Metro Station ایستگاه مترو آزادگان
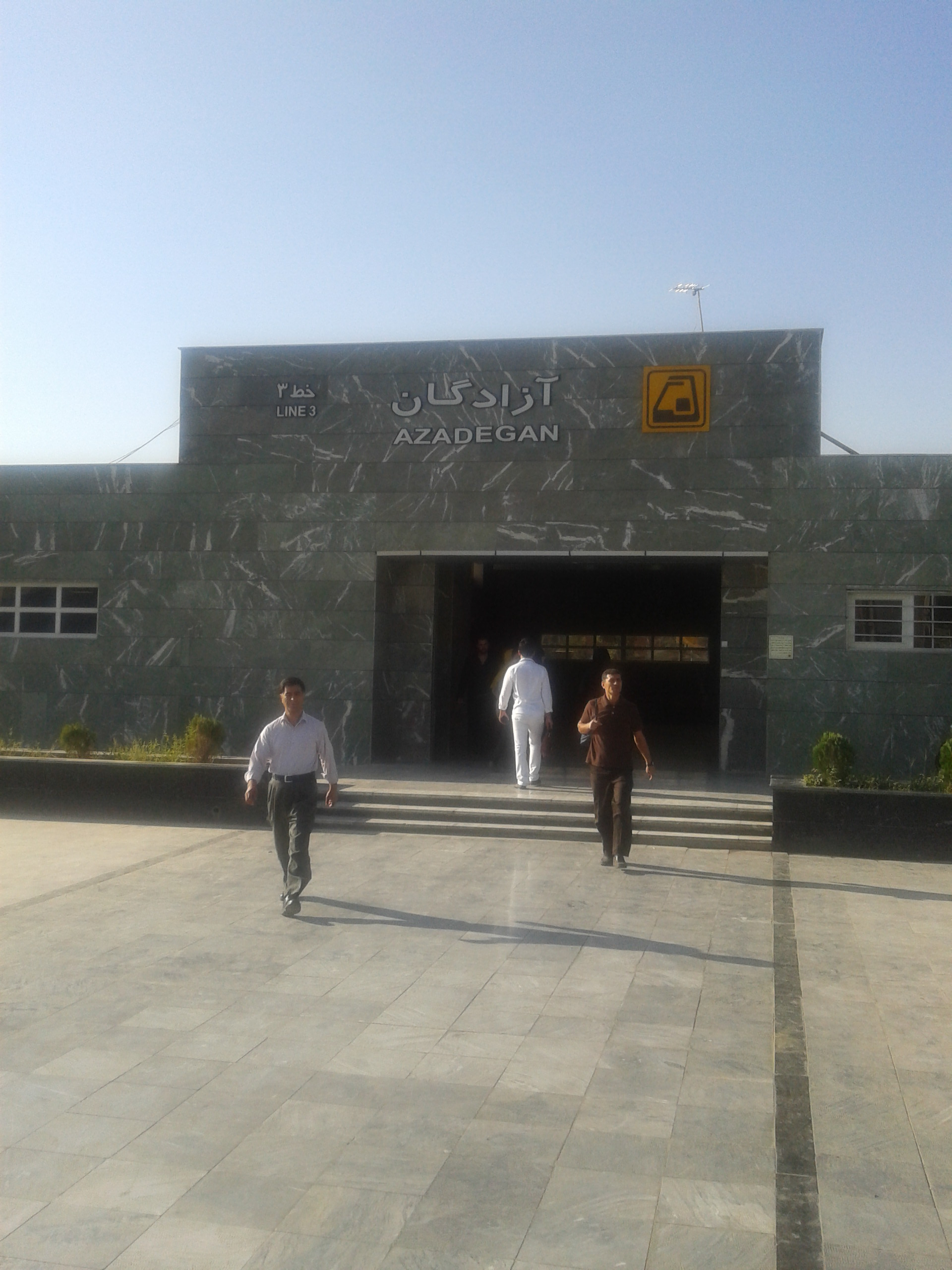

General information
- Location: Saidi Expressway, Districts 18-19, Tehran, Iran
- Coordinates: 35.6273°N 51.3355°E
- System: Tehran Metro Station
- Operator: Tehran Urban and Suburban Railways Organization (Metro)
- Connections: Tehran BRT: BRT 10; Eslamshahr City Buses: Eslamshahr-Azadi; Firuz Bahram-Azadi; Vavan-Azadi (Special); Shahrak-e Emam Hosein-Azadi (Special)

History
- Opened: 2 Ordibehesht, 1393 H-Kh (22 April 2014)

Services
Preceding station	Tehran Metro	Following station
Ne'mat Abad towards Ghaem	Line 3	Terminus
Location
- Location within Tehran

Azadegan Metro Station is the southern terminus in line 3 of the Tehran metro.
