= List of railway stations in Iran =

Railway Stations in Iran
- Railway network in Iran 2020

There are about 300 railway stations in Iran from 1938. The names of some of these stations are as follows:

- Tehran railway station
- Qom railway station
- Karaj railway station
- Kermanshah railway station
- Tabriz railway station
- Isfahan railway station
- Mashhad railway station
- Istgah-e Rah Ahan-e Shush
- Istgah-e Kuh Pank
- Maragheh City railway station
- Nishapur City railway station
- Arak railway station
- Kerman railway station
- Qazvin railway station
- Meybod Railway Station
- Zahedan railway station
- Khan Muhammad Chah railway station
- Mirjaveh railway station

== See also ==
- Islamic Republic of Iran Railways
