= Eslamshahr railway station =

Railway station in Eslamshahr, Iran

Eslamshahr Railway Station ايستگاه راه آهن اسلامشهر

General information
- Location: Eslamshahr, Esmalshahr, Tehran; Iran
- Coordinates: 35.5539343°N 51.2154206°E
Location

Eslamshahr railway station (Persian: ايستگاه راه آهن اسلامشهر, romanized: Istgah-e Rah Ahan-e Eslamshahr) is located in Eslamshahr, Tehran Province. The station is owned by IRI Railway.

== Service summary ==
Note: Classifications are unofficial and only to best reflect the type of service offered on each path
Meaning of Classifications:

- Local Service: Services originating from a major city, and running outwards, with stops at all stations
- Regional Service: Services connecting two major centres, with stops at almost all stations
- InterRegio Service: Services connecting two major centres, with stops at major and some minor stations
- InterRegio-Express Service:Services connecting two major centres, with stops at major stations
- InterCity Service: Services connecting two (or more) major centres, with no stops in between, with the sole purpose of connecting said centres.

Preceding station	Tehran Commuter Railways	Following station
Tappeh Sefid towards Tehran	Tehran - Parand	Nasimshahr towards Parand
Tappeh Sefid towards Tehran	Tehran - Jamkaran	Mohammadieh towards Jamkaran
Preceding station	IRI Railways	Following station
Tappeh Sefid towards Tehran	Tehran - Ahvaz Regional Service	Qom towards Ahvaz
