= Varamin railway station =

Railway station in Varamin, Iran

Varamin Railway Station ايستگاه راه آهن ورامین

General information
- Location: Varamin, Varamin, Tehran; Iran
- Coordinates: 35.3350657°N 51.6451486°E
Location

Varamin railway station (Persian: ايستگاه راه آهن ورامین, romanized: Istgah-e Rah Ahan-e Varamin) is located in Varamin, Tehran Province. The station is owned by IRI Railway.

== Service summary ==
Note: Classifications are unofficial and only to best reflect the type of service offered on each path
Meaning of Classifications:

- Local Service: Services originating from a major city, and running outwards, with stops at all stations
- Regional Service: Services connecting two major centres, with stops at almost all stations
- InterRegio Service: Services connecting two major centres, with stops at major and some minor stations
- InterRegio-Express Service:Services connecting two major centres, with stops at major stations
- InterCity Service: Services connecting two (or more) major centres, with no stops in between, with the sole purpose of connecting said centres.

Preceding station	Tehran Commuter Railways	Following station
Bagher Abad towards Tehran	Tehran - Pishva - Garmsar	Pishva towards Emamzadeh (Pishva) or Garmsar
Preceding station	IRI Railways	Following station
Tehran Terminus	Tehran - Gorgan Regional Service	Garmsar towards Gorgan
Tehran Terminus	Tehran - Mashhad Regional Service	Pishva towards Mashhad
Tehran Terminus	Tehran - Mashhad InterRegio Service	Garmsar towards Mashhad
Tehran Terminus	Tehran - Semnan InterRegio Service	Garmsar towards Semnan
Tehran Terminus	Tehran - Tabas InterRegio Service	Garmsar towards Tabas
