= Tappeh Sefid railway station =

Railway station in Chahardangeh, Iran

Tappeh Sefid Railway Station ايستگاه راه آهن تپه سفید
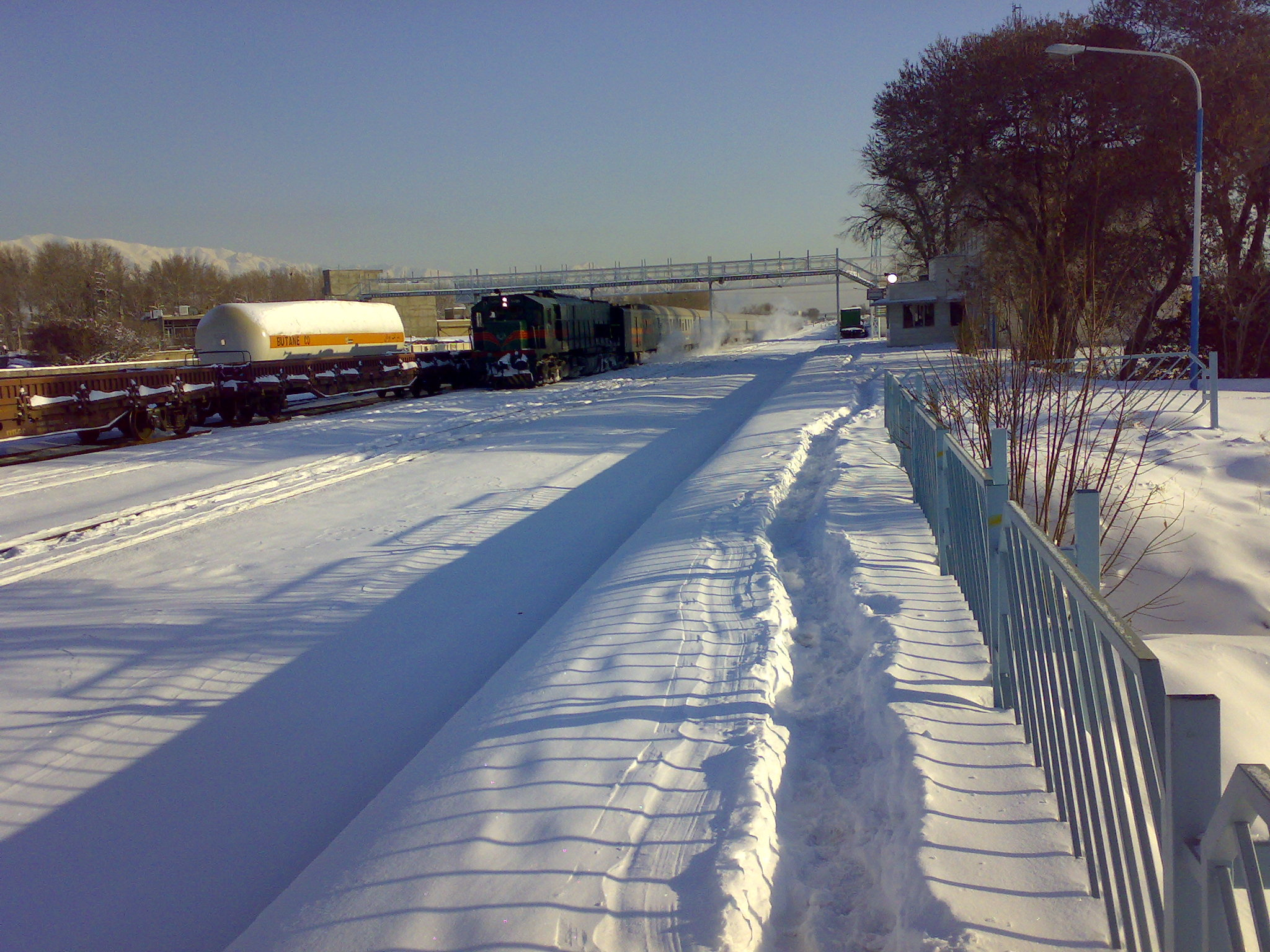

General information
- Location: Chahardangeh, Esmalshahr, Tehran; Iran
- Coordinates: 35.611555°N 51.3058734°E
Location

Tappeh Sefid railway station (Persian: ايستگاه راه آهن تپه سفید, romanized: Istgah-e Rah Ahan-e Tappe Sefid) is located in Chahardangeh, Tehran Province. The station is owned by IRI Railway.

== Service summary ==
Note: Classifications are unofficial and only to best reflect the type of service offered on each path
Meaning of Classifications:

- Local Service: Services originating from a major city, and running outwards, with stops at all stations
- Regional Service: Services connecting two major centres, with stops at almost all stations
- InterRegio Service: Services connecting two major centres, with stops at major and some minor stations
- InterRegio-Express Service:Services connecting two major centres, with stops at major stations
- InterCity Service: Services connecting two (or more) major centres, with no stops in between, with the sole purpose of connecting said centres.

Preceding station	Tehran Commuter Railways	Following station
Tehran Terminus	Tehran - Parand	Eslamshahr towards Parand
Tehran Terminus	Tehran - Jamkaran	Eslamshahr towards Jamkaran
Preceding station	IRI Railways	Following station
Tehran Terminus	Tehran - Ahvaz Regional Service	Eslamshahr towards Ahvaz
