= Shahreza railway station =

Railway station in Shahreza, Iran

Shahreza Railway Station ايستگاه راه آهن شهرضا

General information
- Location: Shahreza, Shahreza, Isfahan; Iran
- Coordinates: 31.9760717°N 51.8323428°E
- System: IRI Railway station
Location

Shahreza railway station (Persian: ايستگاه راه آهن شهرضا, romanized: Istgah-e Rah Ahan-e Shahreza) is located in Shahreza, Isfahan Province. The station is owned by IRI Railway.

== Service summary ==
Note: Classifications are unofficial and only to best reflect the type of service offered on each path
Meaning of Classifications:

- Local Service: Services originating from a major city, and running outwards, with stops at all stations
- Regional Service: Services connecting two major centres, with stops at almost all stations
- InterRegio Service: Services connecting two major centres, with stops at major and some minor stations
- InterRegio-Express Service: Services connecting two major centres, with stops at major stations
- InterCity Service: Services connecting two (or more) major centres, with no stops in between, with the sole purpose of connecting said centres.

Preceding station	IRI Railways	Following station
Abadeh towards Shiraz	Shiraz - Mashhad InterRegio Service	Tabas towards Mashhad
Abadeh towards Shiraz	Shiraz - Tehran InterRegio Service	Kashan towards Tehran
