= Eqlid railway station =

Railway station in Fars province, Iran

Eghlid Railway Station ايستگاه راه آهن اقلید

General information
- Location: Eqlid, Eqlid, Fars; Iran
- Coordinates: 31.0067069°N 52.7508015°E
- System: IRI Railway station
Location

Eqlid railway station (Persian: ايستگاه راه آهن اقلید, romanized: Istgah-e Rah Ahan-e Eghlid) is located in Eqlid, Fars province. The station is owned by IRI Railway.

== Service summary ==
Note: Classifications are unofficial and only to best reflect the type of service offered on each path
Meaning of Classifications:

- Local Service: Services originating from a major city, and running outwards, with stops at all stations
- Regional Service: Services connecting two major centres, with stops at almost all stations
- InterRegio Service: Services connecting two major centres, with stops at major and some minor stations
- InterRegio-Express Service:Services connecting two major centres, with stops at major stations
- InterCity Service: Services connecting two (or more) major centres, with no stops in between, with the sole purpose of connecting said centres.

Preceding station	IRI Railways	Following station
Shiraz Terminus	Shiraz - Mashhad InterRegio Service	Abarkuh towards Mashhad
Shiraz Terminus	Shiraz - Tehran InterRegio Service	Abadeh towards Tehran
