= Kashan railway station =

Railway station in Kashan, Iran

Kashan Railway Station ايستگاه راه آهن کاشان

General information
- Location: Kashan, Kashan, Isfahan; Iran
- Coordinates: 33.9875236°N 51.4715883°E
Location

Kashan railway station (Persian: ايستگاه راه آهن کاشان, romanized: Istgah-e Rah Ahan-e Kashan) is located in Kashan, Isfahan Province. The station is owned by IRI Railway. The station is also home to a turnaround wye.

== Service summary ==
Note: Classifications are unofficial and only to best reflect the type of service offered on each path
Meaning of Classifications:

- Local Service: Services originating from a major city, and running outwards, with stops at all stations
- Regional Service: Services connecting two major centres, with stops at almost all stations
- InterRegio Service: Services connecting two major centres, with stops at major and some minor stations
- InterRegio-Express Service:Services connecting two major centres, with stops at major stations
- InterCity Service: Services connecting two (or more) major centres, with no stops in between, with the sole purpose of connecting said centres.

Preceding station	IRI Railways	Following station
Mohammadieh towards Tehran	Tehran - Bandarabbas InterRegio Service	Badrud towards Bandarabbas
Mohammadieh towards Tehran	Tehran - Shiraz InterRegio Service	Shahreza towards Shiraz
Mohammadieh towards Tehran	Tehran - Yazd InterRegio Service	Badrud towards Yazd
Terminus	Kashan - Mashhad InterCity Service	Mashhad Terminus
