= Sufian railway station =

Railway station in East Azerbaijan Province, Iran

Sufian Railway Station ايستگاه راه آهن صوفیان

General information
- Location: Sufian, Shabestar, East Azerbaijan; Iran
- Coordinates: 38.2728856°N 46.0026876°E

Services
Preceding station	Azerbaijan Commuter Railway	Following station
Sahlan towards Tabriz	Tabriz - Jolfa	Piyam towards Jolfa
Sahlan towards Tabriz	Tabriz - Salmas	Dizaj Khalil towards Salmas
Location

Sufian railway station (Persian: ايستگاه راه آهن صوفیان, romanized: Istgah-e Rah Ahan-e Sufian) is located southeast of Sufian, East Azerbaijan Province. The station is owned by IRI Railway. The station serves the town of Sufian.
