= Bagher Abad railway station =

Railway station in Qarchak, Iran

Bagher Abad Railway Station ايستگاه راه آهن باقر آباد

General information
- Location: Qarchak, Qarchak, Tehran; Iran
- Coordinates: 35.4035475°N 51.5840303°E

Services
Preceding station	Tehran Commuter Railways	Following station
Qarchak towards Tehran	Tehran - Pishva - Garmsar	Varamin towards Emamzadeh (Pishva) or Garmsar
Location

Bagher Abad railway station (Persian: ايستگاه راه آهن باقر آباد, romanized: Istgah-e Rah Ahan-e Bagher Abad) is located in Qarchak, Tehran Province. The station is owned by IRI Railway.
