= Abadeh railway station =

Railway station in Abadeh, Iran

Abadeh Railway Station ايستگاه راه آهن آباده

General information
- Location: Abadeh, Abadeh, Fars; Iran
- Coordinates: 31.1701874°N 52.5801024°E
- System: IRI Railway station
- Platforms: 2
Location

Abadeh railway station (Persian: ايستگاه راه آهن آباده, romanized: Istgah-e Rah Ahan-e Abadeh) is located in Abadeh, Fars province. The station is owned by IRI Railway. The station also serves the nearby suburban towns of Soghad and Bahman. The station is also home to a turnaround wye.

== Service summary ==
Note: Classifications are unofficial and only to best reflect the type of service offered on each path
Meaning of Classifications:

- Local Service: Services originating from a major city, and running outwards, with stops at all stations
- Regional Service: Services connecting two major centres, with stops at almost all stations
- InterRegio Service: Services connecting two major centres, with stops at major and some minor stations
- InterRegio-Express Service:Services connecting two major centres, with stops at major stations
- InterCity Service: Services connecting two (or more) major centres, with no stops in between, with the sole purpose of connecting said centres.

Preceding station	IRI Railways	Following station
Eghlid towards Shiraz	Shiraz - Tehran InterRegio Service	Shahreza towards Tehran
