= Robat Karim railway station =

Railway station in Robat Karim, Iran

Robat Karim Railway Station ايستگاه راه آهن رباط کریم

General information
- Location: Robat Karim, Robat Karim, Tehran; Iran
- Coordinates: 35.4817637°N 51.0753268°E
Location

Robat Karim railway station (Persian: ايستگاه راه آهن رباط کریم, romanized: Istgah-e Rah Ahan-e Robat Karim) is located in Robat Karim, Tehran Province. The station is owned by IRI Railway.

== Service summary ==
Note: Classifications are unofficial and only to best reflect the type of service offered on each path
Meaning of Classifications:

- Local Service: Services originating from a major city, and running outwards, with stops at all stations
- Regional Service: Services connecting two major centres, with stops at almost all stations
- InterRegio Service: Services connecting two major centres, with stops at major and some minor stations
- InterRegio-Express Service: Services connecting two major centres, with stops at major stations
- InterCity Service: Services connecting two (or more) major centres, with no stops in between, with the sole purpose of connecting said centres.

Preceding station	Tehran Commuter Railways	Following station
Nasir Shahr towards Tehran	Tehran - Parand	Parand Terminus
