= Qarchak railway station =

Railway station in Qarchak, Iran

Qarchak Railway Station ايستگاه راه آهن قرچک

General information
- Location: Qarchak, Qarchak, Tehran; Iran
- Coordinates: 35.4286744°N 51.566046°E

Services
Preceding station	Tehran Commuter Railways	Following station
Tehran Terminus	Tehran - Pishva - Garmsar	Bagher Abad towards Emamzadeh (Pishva) or Garmsar
Location

Qarchak railway station (Persian: ايستگاه راه آهن قرچک, romanized: Istgah-e Rah Ahan-e Qarchak) is located in Qarchak, Tehran Province. The station is owned by IRI Railway.
