= Marand railway station =

Railway station in Marand, Iran

Marand Railway Station ايستگاه راه آهن مرند

General information
- Location: Marand, Marand, East Azerbaijan; Iran
- Coordinates: 38.4365639°N 45.7942598°E

Services
Preceding station	Azerbaijan Commuter Railway	Following station
Piyam towards Tabriz	Tabriz - Jolfa	Harzand towards Jolfa
Location

Marand railway station (Persian: ايستگاه راه آهن مرند, romanized: Istgah-e Rah Ahan-e Marand) is located in Marand, East Azerbaijan Province. The station is owned by IRI Railway.
