= Dizaj Khalil railway station =

Railway station in East Azerbaijan Province, Iran

Dizaj Khalil Railway Station ايستگاه راه آهن دیزج خلیل

General information
- Location: Dizaj Khalil, Shabestar, East Azerbaijan; Iran
- Coordinates: 38.1438149°N 45.7491624°E

Services
Preceding station	Azerbaijan Commuter Railway	Following station
Sufian towards Tabriz	Tabriz - Salmas	Sharafkhaneh towards Salmas
Location

Dizaj Khalil railway station (Persian: ايستگاه راه آهن دیزج خلیل, romanized: Istgah-e Rah Ahan-e Dizaj Khalil) is located 1.5 km south of Dizaj Khalil, East Azerbaijan Province. The station is owned by IRI Railway. It serves the locality of Dizaj Khalil and other communities nearby from county capital Shabestar and Vayqan, and also Islamic Azad University of Shabestar, 3.5 km away next to Sufian-Salmas Highway.
