= Hashtgerd railway station =

Railway station in Hashtgerd, Iran

Hashtgerd Railway Station ايستگاه راه آهن هشتگرد

General information
- Location: Hashtgerd, Savojbolaq, Alborz; Iran
- Coordinates: 35.9495065°N 50.6699482°E
Location

Hashtgerd railway station (Persian: ايستگاه راه آهن هشتگرد, romanized: Istgah-e Rah Ahan-e Hashtgerd) is located in Hashtgerd, Alborz Province. The station is owned by IRI Railway.

== Service summary ==
Note: Classifications are unofficial and only to best reflect the type of service offered on each path
Meaning of Classifications:

- Local Service: Services originating from a major city, and running outwards, with stops at all stations
- Regional Service: Services connecting two major centres, with stops at almost all stations
- InterRegio Service: Services connecting two major centres, with stops at major and some minor stations
- InterRegio-Express Service:Services connecting two major centres, with stops at major stations
- InterCity Service: Services connecting two (or more) major centres, with no stops in between, with the sole purpose of connecting said centres.

Preceding station	Tehran Commuter Railways	Following station
Karaj towards Tehran	Tehran - Hashtgerd - Qazvin	Terminus
Karaj towards Tehran	Tehran - Hashtgerd - Qazvin	Abyek towards Qazvin or Takestan
Preceding station	IRI Railways	Following station
Qazvin towards Tabriz	Tabriz - Mashhad InterRegio Service	Karaj towards Mashhad
Karaj towards Tehran	Tehran - Mianeh InterRegio Service	Qazvin towards Mianeh
