= Pishva railway station =

Railway station in Pishva, Iran

Pishva Railway Station ايستگاه راه آهن پیشوا

General information
- Location: Pishva, Pishva, Tehran; Iran
- Coordinates: 35.2898929°N 51.7216425°E
Location

Pishva railway station (Persian: ايستگاه راه آهن پیشوا, romanized: Istgah-e Rah Ahan-e Pishva) is located in Pishva, Tehran Province. The station is owned by IRI Railway.

== Service summary ==
Note: Classifications are unofficial and only to best reflect the type of service offered on each path
Meaning of Classifications:

- Local Service: Services originating from a major city, and running outwards, with stops at all stations
- Regional Service: Services connecting two major centres, with stops at almost all stations
- InterRegio Service: Services connecting two major centres, with stops at major and some minor stations
- InterRegio-Express Service:Services connecting two major centres, with stops at major stations
- InterCity Service: Services connecting two (or more) major centres, with no stops in between, with the sole purpose of connecting said centres.

Preceding station	Tehran Commuter Railways	Following station
Varamin towards Tehran	Tehran - Pishva - Garmsar	Emamzadeh (Pishva) Terminus
Varamin towards Tehran	Tehran - Pishva - Garmsar	Garmsar Terminus
Preceding station	IRI Railways	Following station
Varamin towards Tehran	Tehran - Mashhad Regional Service	Garmsar towards Mashhad
