= Karaj railway station =

Railway station in Karaj, Iran

Karaj Railway Station ايستگاه راه آهن کرج
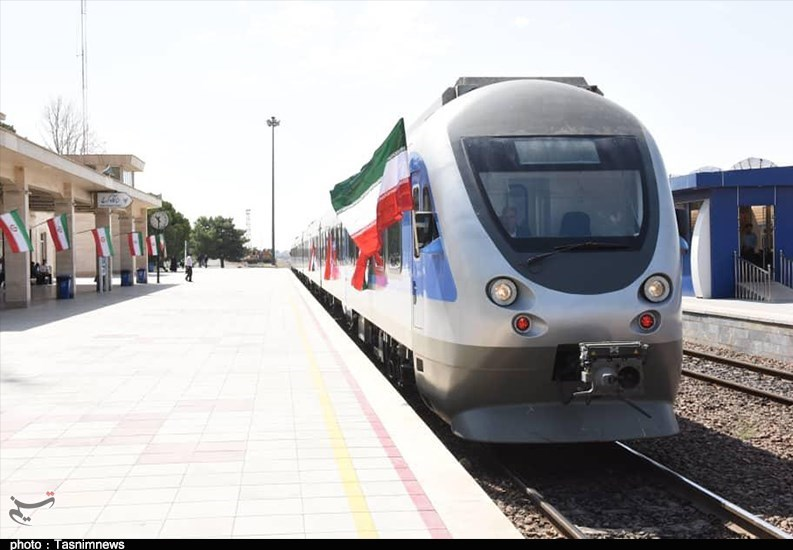

General information
- Location: Karaj, Karaj, Alborz; Iran
- Coordinates: 35.7794938°N 50.9891161°E
Location

Karaj railway station (Persian: ايستگاه راه آهن کرج, romanized: Istgah-e Rah Ahan-e Karaj) is located in Karaj, Alborz Province. The station is owned by IRI Railway. The station is 1.8 km south of Karaj Metro Station, which serves Tehran Metro Line 5.

== Service summary ==
Note: Classifications are unofficial and only to best reflect the type of service offered on each path
Meaning of Classifications:

- Local Service: Services originating from a major city, and running outwards, with stops at all stations
- Regional Service: Services connecting two major centres, with stops at almost all stations
- InterRegio Service: Services connecting two major centres, with stops at major and some minor stations
- InterRegio-Express Service:Services connecting two major centres, with stops at major stations
- InterCity Service: Services connecting two (or more) major centres, with no stops in between, with the sole purpose of connecting said centres.

Preceding station	Tehran Commuter Railways	Following station
Shahr-e Qods towards Tehran	Tehran - Hashtgerd - Qazvin	Hashtgerd towards Hashtgerd, Qazvin or Takestan
Preceding station	IRI Railways	Following station
Terminus	Karaj - Mashhad InterRegio Service	Tehran towards Mashhad
Hashtgerd towards Tabriz	Tabriz - Mashhad InterRegio Service	Tehran towards Mashhad
Tehran Terminus	Tehran - Mianeh InterRegio Service	Hashtgerd towards Mianeh
Tehran Terminus	Tehran - Rasht InterRegio Service	Qazvin towards Rasht
Tehran Terminus	Tehran - Zanjan InterRegio Service	Qazvin towards Zanjan
Terminus	Karaj - Mashhad InterCity Service	Tehran towards Mashhad
