= Qom railway station =

Railway station in Qom, Iran

Qom Railway Station ايستگاه راه آهن قم
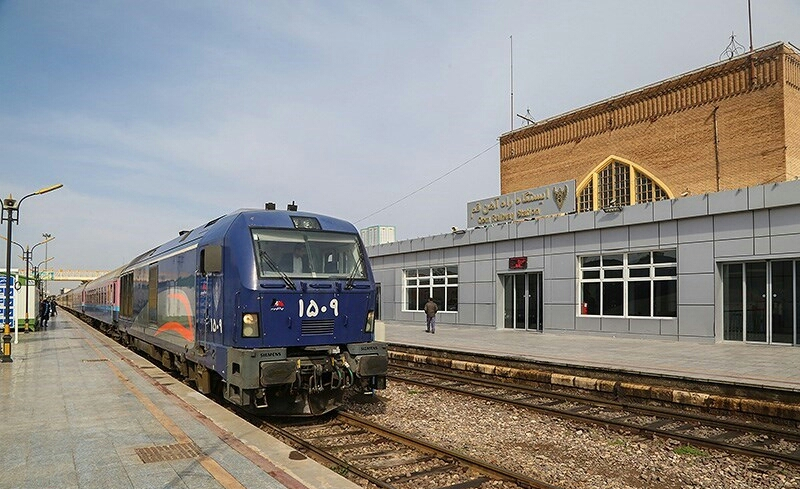

General information
- Location: Qom, Qom; Iran; Iran
- Coordinates: 34.6482667°N 50.8728549°E
- System: IRI Railway station
- Connections: Shuttle bus to Mohammadieh Station
Location

Qom railway station (Persian: ايستگاه راه آهن قم, romanized: Istgah-e Rah Ahan-e Qom) is located in Qom, Qom Province. The station is owned by IRI Railway. All train services were moved to Mohammadieh railway station on the outskirts of the city, however due to public demand and drop in passenger levels, some services were restored in this city centre station. There are connections planned to Qom Metro lines A and Monorail.

== Service summary ==
Note: Classifications are unofficial and only to best reflect the type of service offered on each path
Meaning of Classifications:

- Local Service: Services originating from a major city, and running outwards, with stops at all stations
- Regional Service: Services connecting two major centres, with stops at almost all stations
- InterRegio Service: Services connecting two major centres, with stops at major and some minor stations
- InterRegio-Express Service: Services connecting two major centres, with stops at major stations
- InterCity Service: Services connecting two (or more) major centres, with no stops in between, with the sole purpose of connecting said centres.

Preceding station	Tehran Commuter Railways	Following station
Tehran Terminus	Tehran - Qom	Terminus
Preceding station	IRI Railways	Following station
Eslamshahr towards Tehran	Tehran - Ahvaz Regional Service	Arak towards Ahvaz
Arak towards Ahvaz	Ahvaz - Mashhad InterRegio-Express Service	Tehran towards Mashhad
Terminus	Qom - Mashhad InterRegio-Express Service	Semnan towards Mashhad
Terminus	Qom - Mashhad InterCity Service	Mashhad Terminus
