= Sahlan railway station =

Railway station in Sahlan, Iran

Sahlan Railway Station ايستگاه راه آهن سهلان

General information
- Location: Sahlan, Tabriz, East Azerbaijan; Iran
- Coordinates: 38.1975147°N 46.0985538°E

Services
Preceding station	Azerbaijan Commuter Railway	Following station
Tabriz Terminus	Tabriz - Jolfa	Sufian towards Jolfa
Tabriz Terminus	Tabriz - Salmas	Sufian towards Salmas
Location

Sahlan railway station (Persian: ايستگاه راه آهن سهلان, romanized: Istgah-e Rah Ahan-e Sahlan) is located near Sahlan (Saghalan) East Azerbaijan Province, Iran. The station is owned by IRI Railway. The station is rural in nature, and its infrastructures and accesses are still undeveloped, and thus it virtually cannot serve any population centre or point of interest.
