= Nasimshahr railway station =

Railway station in Nasimshahr, Iran

Nasimshahr Railway Station ايستگاه راه آهن نسیم شهر

General information
- Location: Nasimshahr, Baharestan, Tehran; Iran
- Coordinates: 35.5420982°N 51.1781278°E

Services
Preceding station	Tehran Commuter Railways	Following station
Eslamshahr towards Tehran	Tehran - Parand	Golestan towards Parand
Location

Nasimshahr railway station (Persian: ايستگاه راه آهن نسیم شهر, romanized: Istgah-e Rah Ahan-e Nasimshahr) is located in Nasimshahr, Tehran Province. The station is owned by IRI Railway.
