= Mohammadieh railway station =

Railway station in Qom, Iran

Mohammadieh Railway Station ايستگاه راه آهن محمدیه

General information
- Location: Qom, Qom; Iran
- Coordinates: 34.5587298°N 51.0482365°E
- Connections: Shuttle bus to Qom Station
Location

Mohammadieh railway station (Persian: ايستگاه راه آهن محمدیه, romanized: Istgah-e Rah Ahan-e Mohammadieh) is located in Qom, Qom Province. The station is owned by IRI Railway. In order to shorten travel time on passing longer distance trains, most services serving Qom railway station in the city centre were moved to this station located on Qom bypass rail line.

== Service summary ==
Note: Classifications are unofficial and only to best reflect the type of service offered on each path
Meaning of Classifications:

- Local Service: Services originating from a major city, and running outwards, with stops at all stations
- Regional Service: Services connecting two major centres, with stops at almost all stations
- InterRegio Service: Services connecting two major centres, with stops at major and some minor stations
- InterRegio-Express Service:Services connecting two major centres, with stops at major stations
- InterCity Service: Services connecting two (or more) major centres, with no stops in between, with the sole purpose of connecting said centres.

Preceding station	Tehran Commuter Railways	Following station
Eslamshahr towards Tehran	Tehran - Jamkaran	Jamkaran Terminus
Preceding station	IRI Railways	Following station
Tehran Terminus	Tehran - Bandarabbas InterRegio Service	Kashan towards Bandarabbas
Tehran Terminus	Tehran - Bandarabbas InterRegio-Express Service	Badrud towards Bandarabbas
Tehran Terminus	Tehran - Shiraz InterRegio Service	Kashan towards Shiraz
Tehran Terminus	Tehran - Yazd InterRegio Service	Kashan towards Yazd
