= Shahr-e Qods railway station =

Railway station in Qods, Iran

Shahr-e Qods Railway Station ايستگاه راه آهن شهر قدس

General information
- Location: Shahr-e Qods, Qods, Tehran; Iran
- Coordinates: 35.72481°N 51.1278551°E

Services
Preceding station	Tehran Commuter Railways	Following station
Tehran Terminus	Tehran - Hashtgerd - Qazvin	Karaj towards Hashtgerd, Qazvin or Takestan
Location

Shahr-e Qods railway station (Persian: ايستگاه راه آهن شهر قدس, romanized: Istgah-e Rah Ahan-e Shahr-e Qods) is located in Shahr-e Qods, Tehran Province. The station is owned by IRI Railway.
