= Tarbiat-e Mo'allem railway station =

Railway station in Iran

Tarbiat-e Mo'allem Railway Station ايستگاه راه آهن تربیت معلم

General information
- Location: Azarbaijan Shahid Madani University; Azarshahr, Azarshahr, East Azerbaijan; Iran
- Coordinates: 37.8122669°N 45.9363028°E

Services
Preceding station	Azerbaijan Commuter Railway	Following station
Zeraei towards Tabriz	Tabriz - Tarbiat-e Mo'allem	Terminus
Location

Tarbiat-e Mo'allem railway station (Persian: ايستگاه راه آهن تربیت معلم, romanized: Istgah-e Rah Ahan-e Tarbiat-e Mo'allem) is located on northern edge of Azarshahr, and on the southern edge of Mamqan, East Azerbaijan Province. The station is owned by IRI Railway. The station serves primarily the students, staff, and faculty of Azarbaijan Shahid Madani University, and is named after the university.
