= Garmsar railway station =

Railway station in Iran

Garmsar Railway Station ايستگاه راه آهن گرمسار

General information
- Location: Garmsar, Garmsar, Semnan; Iran
- Coordinates: 35.2352486°N 52.3092582°E
Location

Garmsar railway station (Persian: ايستگاه راه آهن گرمسار, romanized: Istgah-e Rah Ahan-e Garmsar) is located in Garmsar, Semnan Province. The station is owned by IRI Railway.

== Service summary ==
Note: Classifications are unofficial and only to best reflect the type of service offered on each path
Meaning of Classifications:

- Local Service: Services originating from a major city, and running outwards, with stops at all stations
- Regional Service: Services connecting two major centres, with stops at almost all stations
- InterRegio Service: Services connecting two major centres, with stops at major and some minor stations
- InterRegio-Express Service:Services connecting two major centres, with stops at major stations
- InterCity Service: Services connecting two (or more) major centres, with no stops in between, with the sole purpose of connecting said centres.

| Preceding station | Tehran Commuter Railways | Following station |
|---|---|---|
| Pishva towards Tehran | Tehran - Pishva - Garmsar | Terminus |
| Preceding station | IRI Railways | Following station |
| Varamin towards Tehran | Tehran - Gorgan Regional Service | Simin Dasht towards Gorgan |
| Pishva towards Tehran | Tehran - Mashhad Regional Service | Yateri towards Mashhad |
| Varamin towards Tehran | Tehran - Mashhad InterRegio Service | Semnan towards Mashhad |
| Varamin towards Tehran | Tehran - Semnan InterRegio Service | Yateri towards Semnan |
| Varamin towards Tehran | Tehran - Tabas InterRegio Service | Semnan towards Tabas |
