= Isfahan railway station =

Railway station in Isfahan, Iran

Coordinates: 32°32′59.51″N 51°41′41.61″E

Isfahan Railway Station ايستگاه راه آهن اصفهان
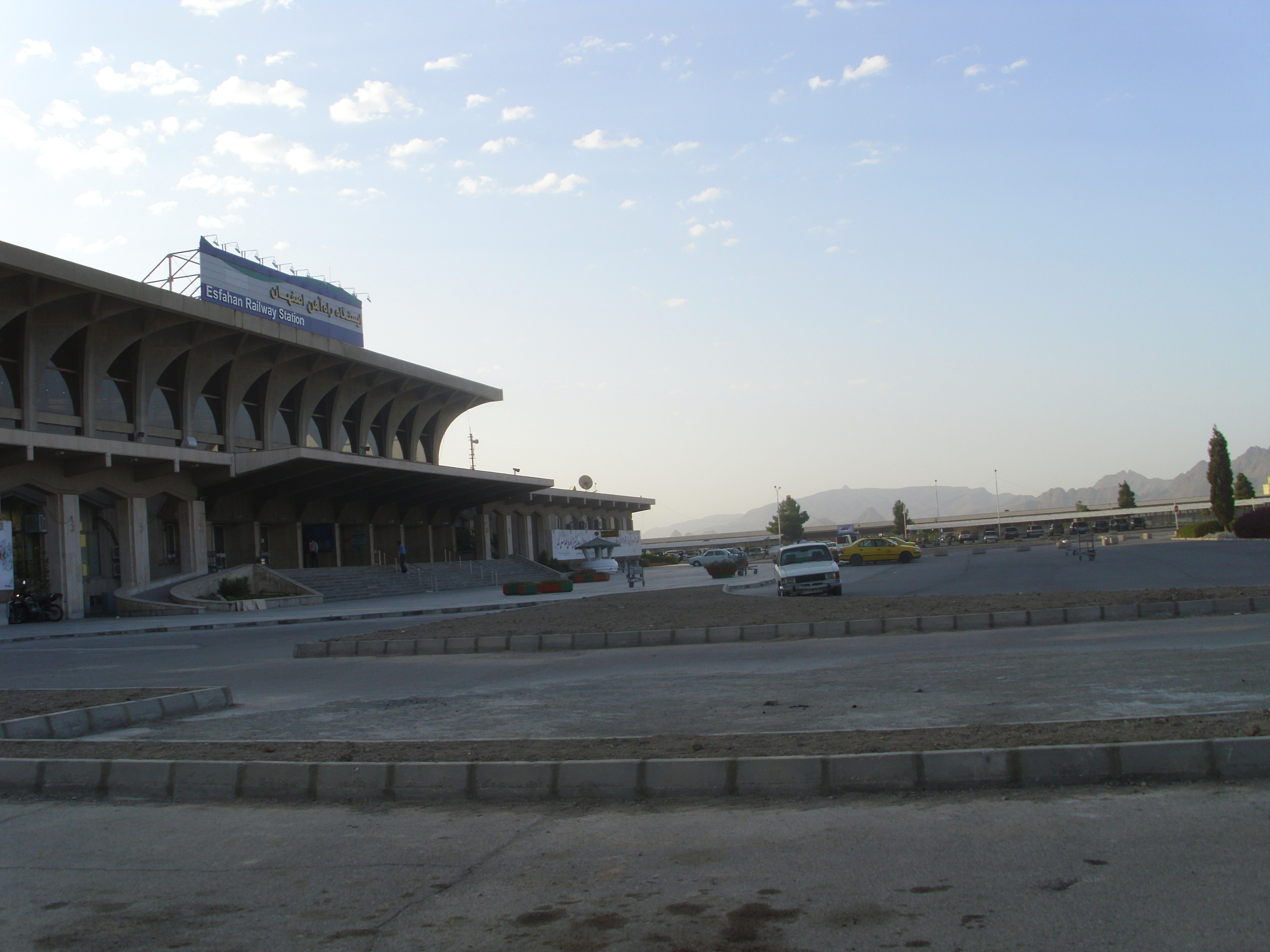
- Facade of the station building

General information
- Location: Iran
- System: IRI Railway station
- Connections: Isfahan City Buses: 37 Azadi - Rahahan

History
- Opened: 1966
Location

Isfahan railway station (Persian: ايستگاه راه آهن اصفهان, romanized: Istgah-e Rah Ahan-e Isfahan) is located in Isfahan, Isfahan Province, the third largest city and second largest metropolitan area of Iran. The station is owned by IRI Railway and currently has two tri-weekly services, one to Mashhad and one to Bandarabbas.

The station is designed as a terminal station, with railways branching off of the main line and ending at the station. This has made some of the lines passing through Isfahan to bypass the station altogether, to save one to two hours of time wasted on going into the branch and reversing out.

There is a metro station under construction at the station connecting the station to the city centre, and Isfahan's two main inter-urban bus terminals.

== Service summary ==
Note: Classifications are unofficial and only to best reflect the type of service offered on each path
Meaning of Classifications:

- Local Service: Services originating from a major city, and running outwards, with stops at all stations
- Regional Service: Services connecting two major centres, with stops at almost all stations
- InterRegio Service: Services connecting two major centres, with stops at major and some minor stations
- InterRegio-Express Service:Services connecting two major centres, with stops at major stations
- InterCity Service: Services connecting two (or more) major centres, with no stops in between, with the sole purpose of connecting said centres.

Preceding station	IRI Railways	Following station
Terminus	Isfahan - Bandarabbas InterRegio Service	Meybod towards Mashhad
Terminus	Isfahan - Mashhad InterCity Service	Tabas towards Mashhad
