= Tabas railway station =

Railway station in Tabas, Iran

Tabas Railway Station ايستگاه راه آهن طبس

General information
- Location: Iran
- Coordinates: 33.6133348°N 56.8900213°E
- System: IRI Railway station
Location

Tabas railway station (Persian: ايستگاه راه آهن طبس, romanized: Istgah-e Rah Ahan-e Tabas) is located in Tabas, South Khorasan. The station is owned by IRI Railway.

== Service summary ==
Note: Classifications are unofficial and only to best reflect the type of service offered on each path
Meaning of Classifications:

- Local Service: Services originating from a major city, and running outwards, with stops at all stations
- Regional Service: Services connecting two major centres, with stops at almost all stations
- InterRegio Service: Services connecting two major centres, with stops at major and some minor stations
- InterRegio-Express Service:Services connecting two major centres, with stops at major stations
- InterCity Service: Services connecting two (or more) major centres, with no stops in between, with the sole purpose of connecting said centres.

| Preceding station | IRI Railways | Following station |
|---|---|---|
| Bajestan towards Tehran | Tehran - Tabas InterRegio Service | Terminus |
| Shahreza towards Shiraz | Shiraz - Mashhad InterRegio Service | Mashhad Terminus |
| Isfahan Terminus | Isfahan - Mashhad InterCity Service | Mashhad Terminus |
