= Sharafkhaneh railway station =

Railway station in East Azerbaijan Province, Iran

Sharafkhaneh Railway Station ايستگاه راه آهن شرفخانه

General information
- Location: Sharafkhaneh, Shabestar, East Azerbaijan; Iran
- Coordinates: 38.1682999°N 45.4854074°E
Location

Sharafkhaneh railway station (Persian: ايستگاه راه آهن شرفخانه, romanized: Istgah-e Rah Ahan-e Sharafkhaneh) is located in the town of Sharafkhaneh, East Azerbaijan Province, on the northern shore of Lake Urmia. The station is owned by IRI Railway.

== Service summary ==
Note: Classifications are unofficial and only to reflect the type of service offered on each path
Meaning of Classifications:

- Local Service: Services originating from a major city, and running outwards, with stops at all stations
- Regional Service: Services connecting two major centres, with stops at almost all stations
- InterRegio Service: Services connecting two major centres, with stops at major and some minor stations
- InterRegio-Express Service: Services connecting two major centres, with stops at major stations
- InterCity Service: Services connecting two (or more) major centres, with no stops in between, with the sole purpose of connecting said centres.

Preceding station	Azerbaijan Commuter Railway	Following station
Dizaj Khalil towards Tabriz	Tabriz - Salmas	Cheshmeh Kanan towards Salmas
Preceding station	IRI Railways	Following station
Tabriz Terminus	Tabriz - Razi InterRegio Service	Salmas towards Razi
