= Abyek railway station =

Railway station in Abyek, Iran

Abyek Railway Station ايستگاه راه آهن آبیک

General information
- Location: Abyek, Abyek, Qazvin; Iran
- Coordinates: 36.0330046°N 50.5097398°E

Services
| Preceding station | Tehran Commuter Railways | Following station |
|---|---|---|
| Hashtgerd towards Tehran | Tehran - Hashtgerd - Qazvin | Qazvin towards Qazvin or Takestan |
Location

Abyek railway station (Persian: ايستگاه راه آهن آبیک, romanized: Istgah-e Rah Ahan-e Abyek) is located in Abyek, Qazvin province. The station is owned by IRI Railway.
