= Gargar railway station =

Railway station in East Azerbaijan Province, Azerbaijan

Gargar Railway Station ايستگاه راه آهن گرگر

General information
- Location: Hadishahr, Jolfa, East Azerbaijan; Iran
- Coordinates: 38.8318123°N 45.6334439°E

Services
Preceding station	Azerbaijan Commuter Railway	Following station
Harzand towards Tabriz	Tabriz - Jolfa	Jolfa Terminus
Location

Gargar railway station (Persian: ايستگاه راه آهن گرگر, romanized: Istgah-e Rah Ahan-e Gargar) is located in Hadishahr, East Azerbaijan Province. The station is owned by IRI Railway. The station serves the city of Hadishahr. It is located 3 km west of the centre of Gargar neighbourhood of the city, and 5 km southwest of Alamdar neighbourhood.
