= Qazvin railway station =

Railway station in Iran

Qazvin Railway Station ايستگاه راه آهن قزوین
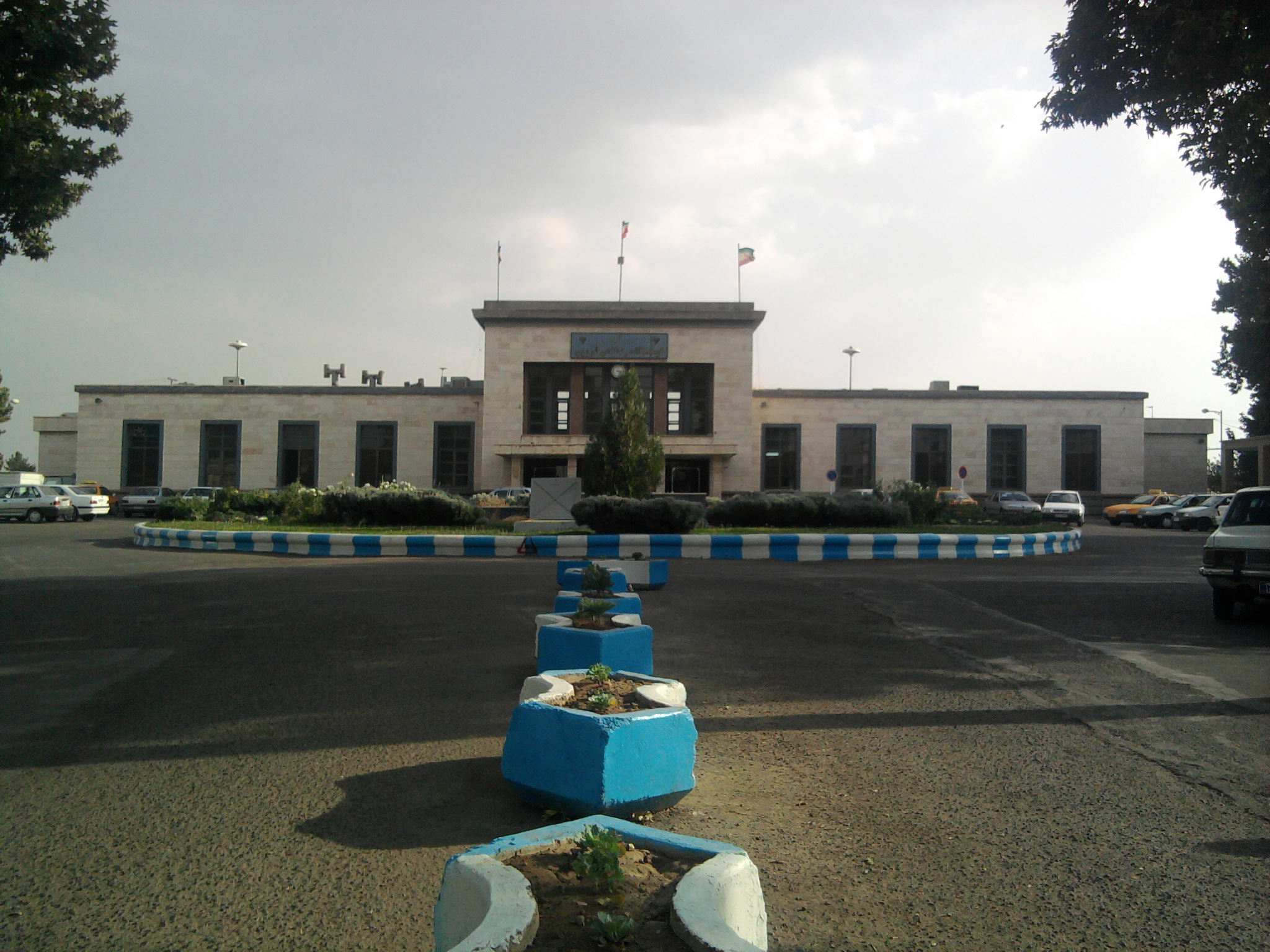
- Qazvin Railway Station in 2012

General information
- Location: Qazvin, Qazvin, Qazvin; Iran
- Coordinates: 36.2436961°N 50.0077859°E
Location

Qazvin railway station (Persian: ايستگاه راه آهن قزوین, romanized: Istgah-e Rah Ahan-e Qazvin) is located in Qazvin, Qazvin Province, Iran. The station is owned by IRI Railway.

== Service summary ==
Preceding station	Tehran Commuter Railways	Following station
Abyek towards Tehran	Tehran - Hashtgerd - Qazvin	Terminus
Abyek towards Tehran	Tehran - Hashtgerd - Qazvin	Takestan Terminus
Preceding station	IRI Railways	Following station
Terminus	Qazvin - Mashhad InterRegio-Express Service	Tehran towards Mashhad
Zanjan towards Tabriz	Tabriz - Mashhad InterRegio Service	Hashtgerd towards Mashhad
Tehran Terminus	Tehran - Mahabad InterRegio Service	Takestan towards Mahabad
Tehran Terminus	Tehran - Maragheh InterRegio Service	Takestan towards Maragheh
Hashtgerd towards Tehran	Tehran - Mianeh InterRegio Service	Takestan towards Mianeh
Karaj towards Tehran	Tehran - Rasht InterRegio Service	Rasht Terminus
Tehran Terminus	Tehran - Tabriz InterRegio Service	Takestan towards Tabriz
