= Mohammad Rahmati (minister) =

Iranian politician and CEO

Mohammad Rahmati (Persian: محمد رحمتی; born 1958 in Yazd) was the Minister of Roads in the two governments of Khatami and Ahmadinejad and the CEO of the Iranian Railway Company.
