= Ahvaz Metro =

Rapid transit system in Ahvaz, Iran

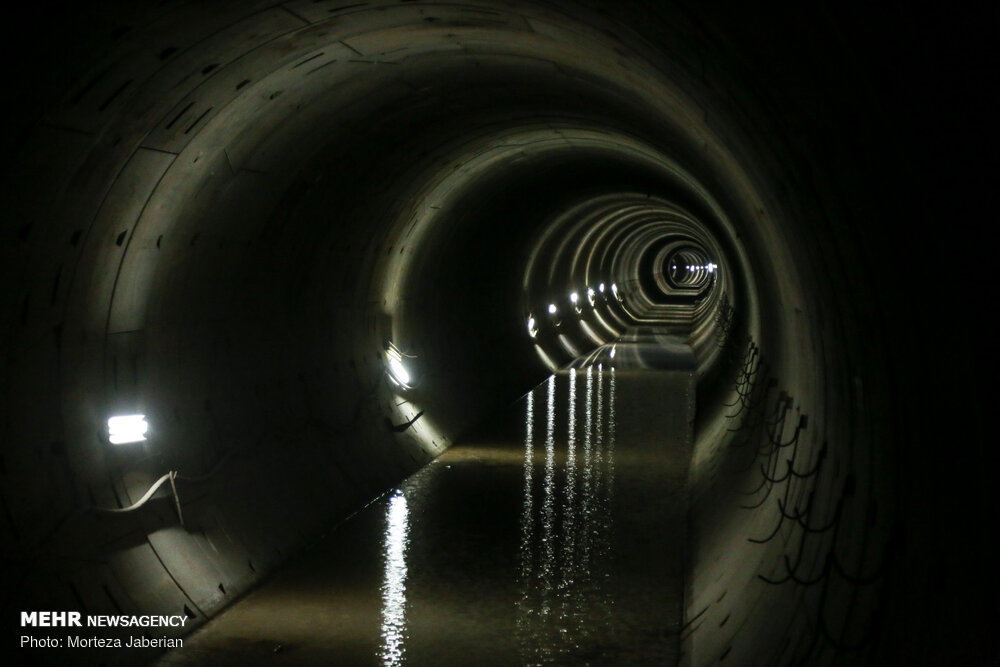

Overview
- Native name: متروی اهواز / Metro-ye Ahvâz
- Owner: Ahvaz Municipality
- Locale: Ahvaz, Khuzestan; Iran
- Transit type: Rapid transit
- Website: Urban Railway Organization

Operation
- Began operation: 2025

Technical
- System length: Line 1: 23 km
- Track gauge: 1,435 mm (4 ft 8 1/2 in) (standard gauge)
System Map
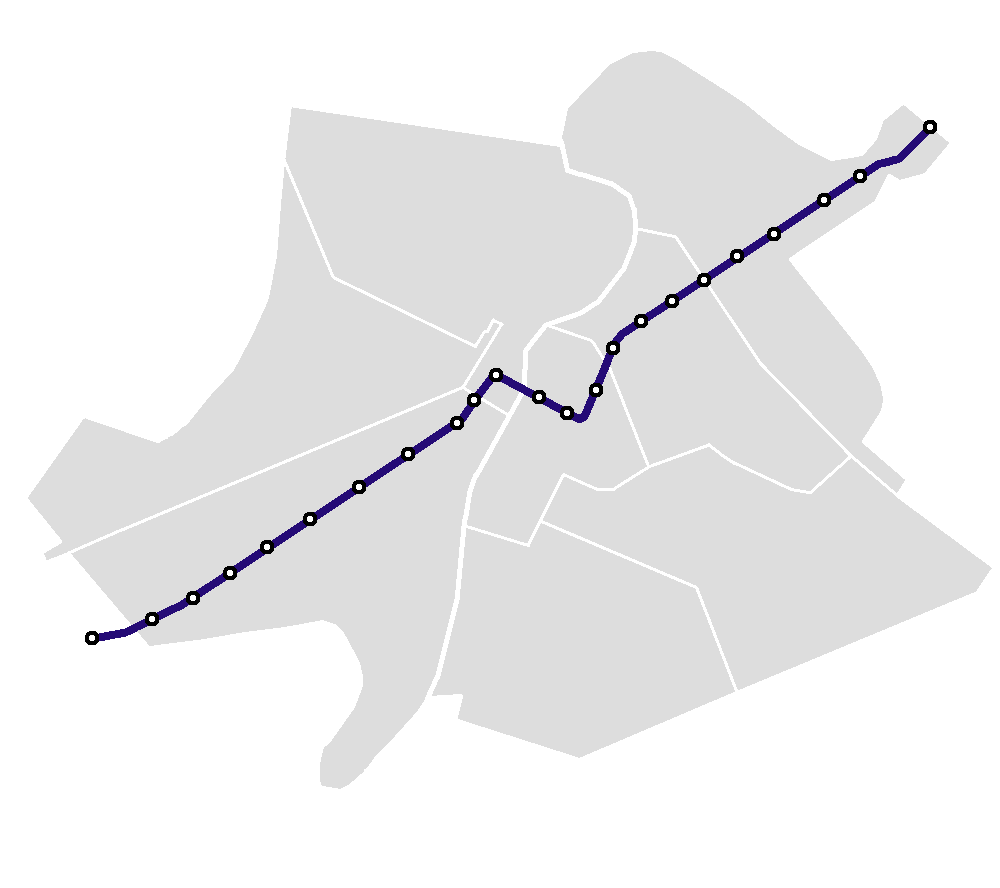

Ahvaz Metro is a metro system serving the city of Ahvaz, Iran. The first line with a length of 23 km is currently under construction with 24 stations. There are three other lines also planned for the city.

== Lines ==
=== Line 1 ===
Line 1 of Ahvaz metro is currently under construction. The line starts from the Northeast of the city, from in front of the power plant, going to the Southwest of the city, passing through near Ahvaz Airport, through Ahvaz old town on the left bank of Karun River, crossing the river and passing through Ahvaz Central Business and Administrative District and near Ahvaz railway station, passing the side of Chamran University, and continuing to the city's border to Baghaei Hospital.

The line is being built in 4 segments or phases. The metro remains unopened. As of 2026, construction is delayed, and the city is finalizing a new contract with Khatam-al Anbiya after legally dismissing the original contractor, Kayson.

=== Line 2 ===
Line 2 of Ahvaz metro is planned for construction later. The line will run opposite of Line 1, from Southeast to Northwest.

=== Line 3 ===
Line 3 is currently in the planning stage. it will run in an East West direction on the southern edge of central Ahvaz.

=== Line 4 ===
Line 4 is currently in the planning stage. it will run in an East West direction further north of the city, just south of the airport.

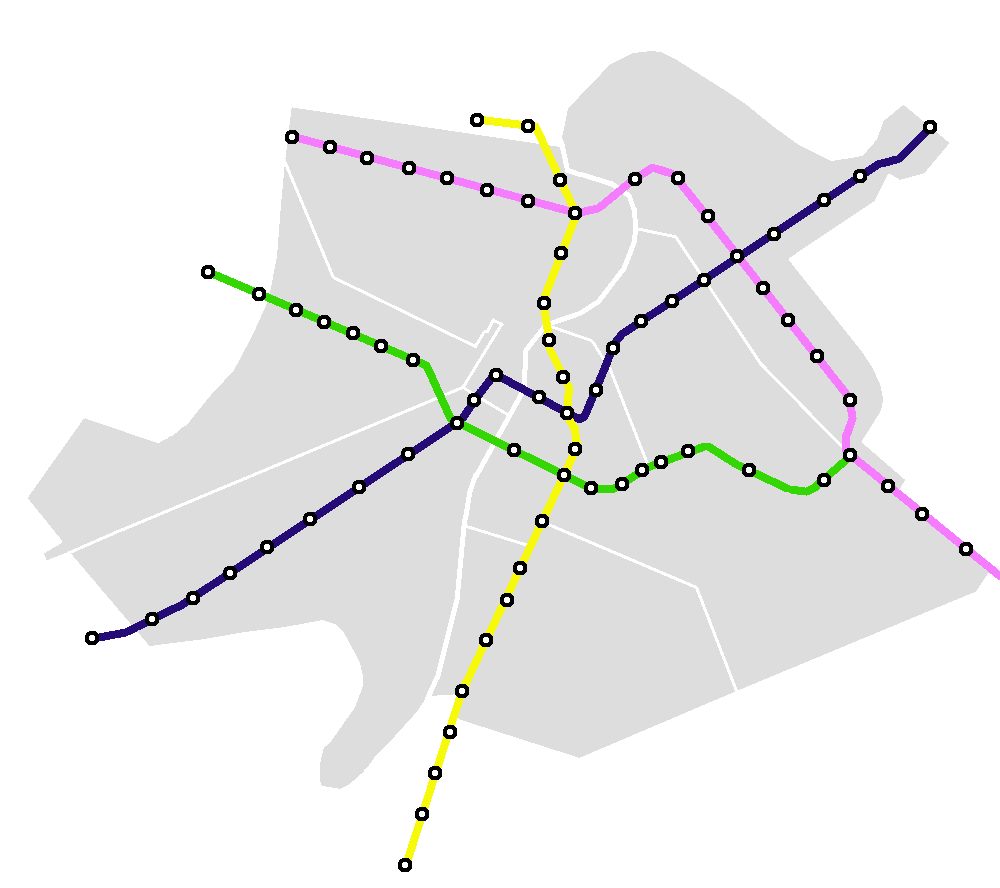
Expansion plans of Ahvaz Metro

== Rolling stock ==
Rolling stock will be supplied by CRRC Nanjing Puzhen in cooperation with Wagon Pars.

== See also ==
- Rapid transit in Iran
