= Qom Urban Railway =

Rapid transit system in Qom, Iran

Qom Metro
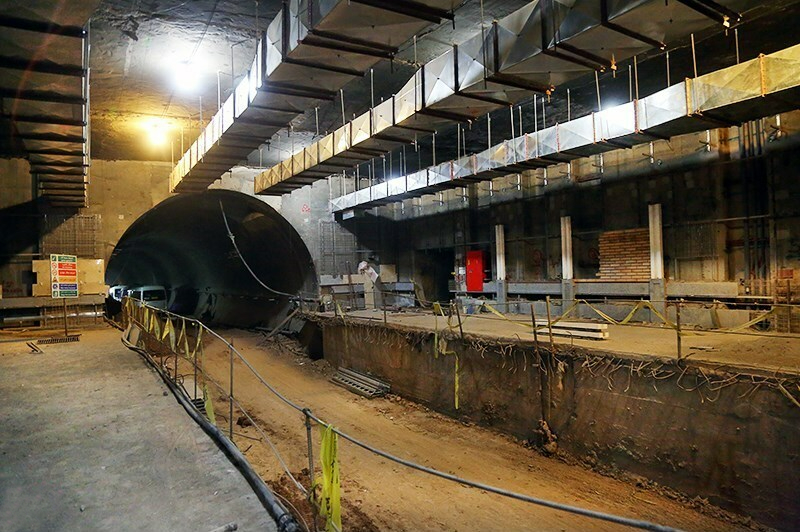

Overview
- Native name: متروی قم/ Metro-ye Qom
- Owner: Qom Municipality
- Locale: Qom, Qom; Iran
- Transit type: Rapid transit
- Website: Urban Railway Organization

Technical
- System length: Line A: 14 km (8.7 mi); Line M: 7 km (4.3 mi)
- Track gauge: 1,435 mm (4 ft 8 1/2 in) (standard gauge)
System Map
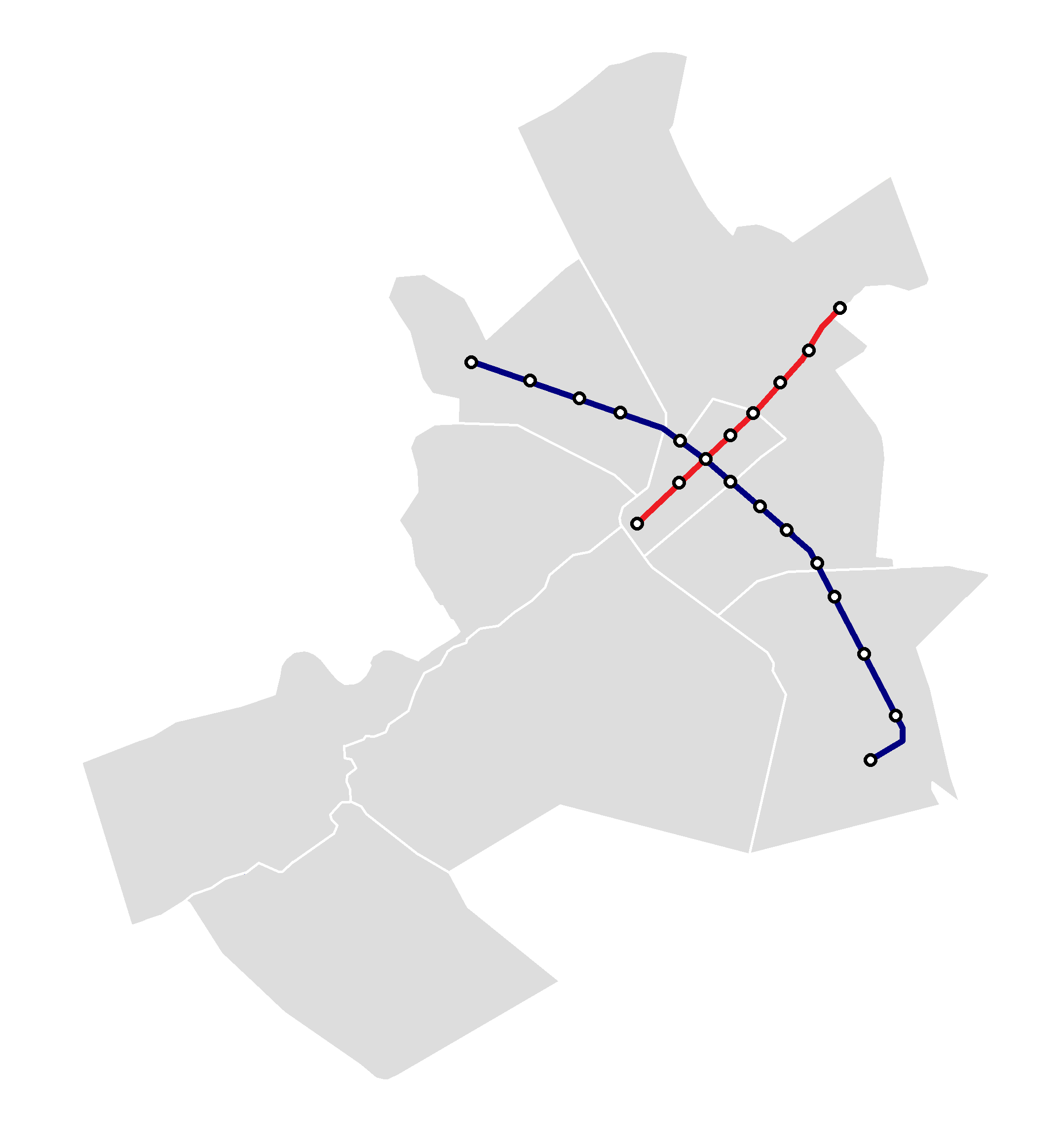

Qom Metro is a metro system serving the city of Qom, Iran, currently under construction. A metro line with a length of 14 kilometres (8.7 mi) with 14 stations is due to be completed by 2026. A monorail line with a length of 7 kilometres (4.3 mi) with 8 stations is partially built but construction has been halted. An extension of the monorail, plus two other brand new metro lines, are being considered as part of future plans.

== Lines ==
=== Line A ===
Line A is an underground metro line currently under construction, it was due to open by the end of 2021, but delayed.The line has a length of 14 kilometres (8.7 mi) with 14 stations, extending from the Northern edge of the city, passing near Qom railway station and Fatima Masumeh Shrine, terminating at Jamkaran Mosque.

=== Line M ===
Line M is a currently partially built monorail line. The line is planned to connect Fatima Masumeh Shrine to locations upstream and downstream of Qom River. Construction commenced in 2009 and large sections including some stations were completed. A two-car train was delivered in 2015 and some testing was carried out. However in 2016 doubts about opening the system by the following year were raised. Further construction was suspended soon after. As of 2021 no information is available on resumption of work.

The line was originally planned to span the whole city East-West but it was cut to its current length. An extension of the line may be considered in the future.

== Other lines ==
Two other metro lines are being considered.

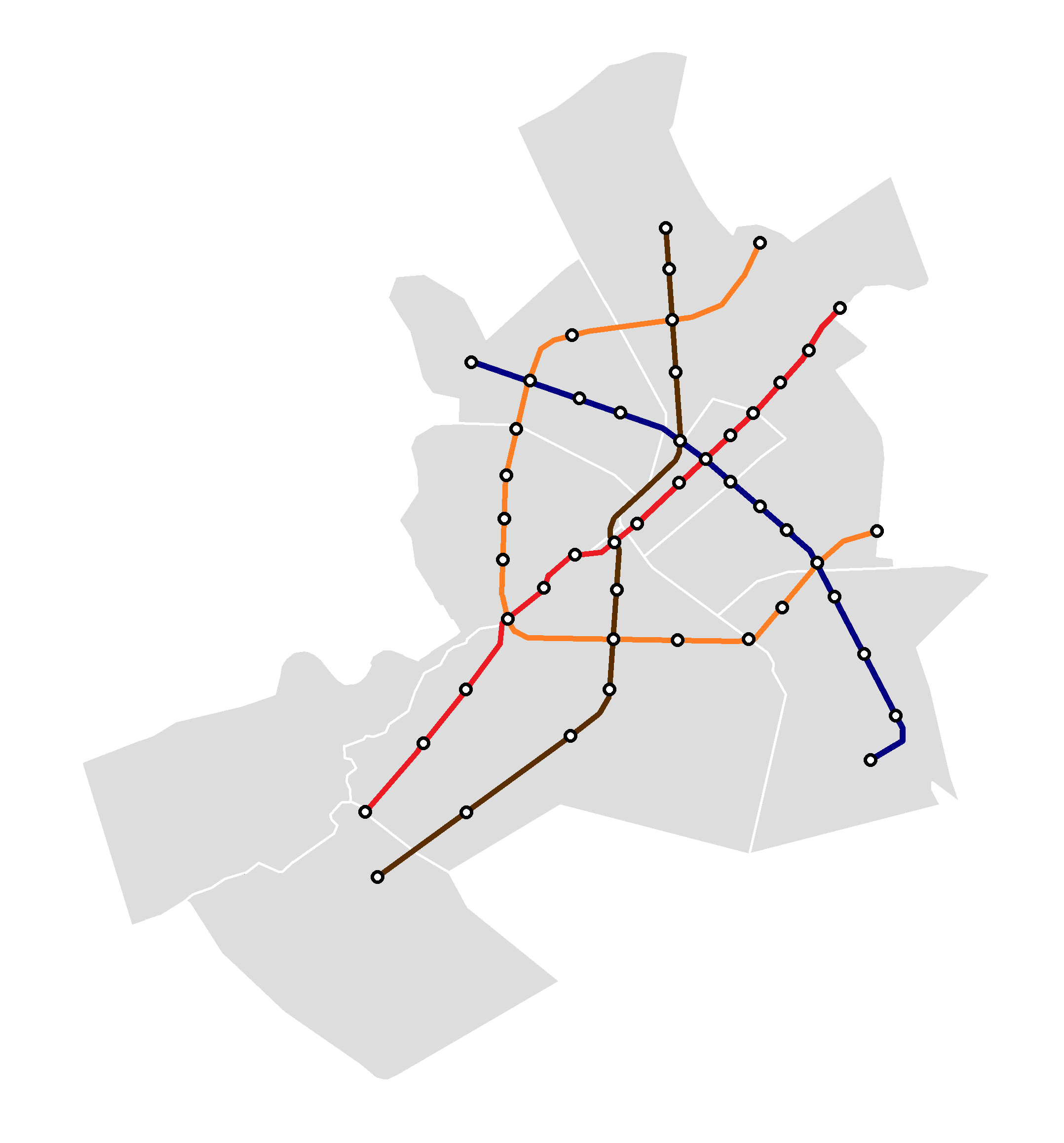
Expansion plans of Qom Metro

== See also ==
- Rapid transit in Iran
