= Jamkaran railway station =

Railway station in Iran

Jamkaran Railway Station ايستگاه راه آهن جمکران

General information
- Location: Jamkaran, Qom, Qom; Iran
- Coordinates: 34.5969069°N 50.9186616°E
Location

Jamkaran railway station (Persian: ايستگاه راه آهن جمکران, romanized: Istgah-e Rah Ahan-e Jamkaran) is located in Jamkaran, in the outskirts of Qom, Qom Province. The station is owned by IRI Railway. There are weekly commuter trains from Tehran on Tuesday evenings and back to Tehran early Wednesday morning as Tuesday evenings are the Jamkaran Mosque's main activity and pilgrimage day.

== Service summary ==
Note: Classifications are unofficial and only to best reflect the type of service offered on each path
Meaning of Classifications:

- Local Service: Services originating from a major city, and running outwards, with stops at all stations
- Regional Service: Services connecting two major centres, with stops at almost all stations
- InterRegio Service: Services connecting two major centres, with stops at major and some minor stations
- InterRegio-Express Service:Services connecting two major centres, with stops at major stations
- InterCity Service: Services connecting two (or more) major centres, with no stops in between, with the sole purpose of connecting said centres.

Preceding station	Tehran Commuter Railways	Following station
Mohammadieh towards Tehran	Tehran - Jamkaran	Terminus
