= Rapid transit in Iran =

Iran has rapid transit systems operating in five cities, and others are under construction.

== Currently operational ==
As of March 2025, the following metro systems were operational in Iran.

- Tehran Metro
- Mashhad Urban Railway
- Shiraz Metro
- Tabriz Metro
- Isfahan Metro
- Karaj Metro

== Under construction ==
Along with extension work on the Tehran Metro and Mashhad urban rail, three other metro projects are being built. In total, 172 extra kilometers were to be built by 2012 and over 380 kilometers in the other cities.

- Other cities with plans to construct a metro:
  - Ahvaz Metro
  - Qom Urban Railway (along with a Monorail Line known as Qom Monorail)
  - Kermanshah Metro
- Other cities with proposed metro projects:
  - Tehran LRT
  - Tabriz Tramway
  - Shiraz Tram System
  - Urmia Tramway
  - Rasht Tramway
  - Kerman Tramway
  - Hamadan Tramway
  - Qazvin Tramway
  - Kish Tramway

== See also ==
- List of tram and light-rail transit systems
- List of bus rapid transit systems
- List of rapid transit systems
