= Ahvaz railway station =

Railway station in Ahvaz, Iran

Ahvaz Railway Station ايستگاه راه آهن اهواز
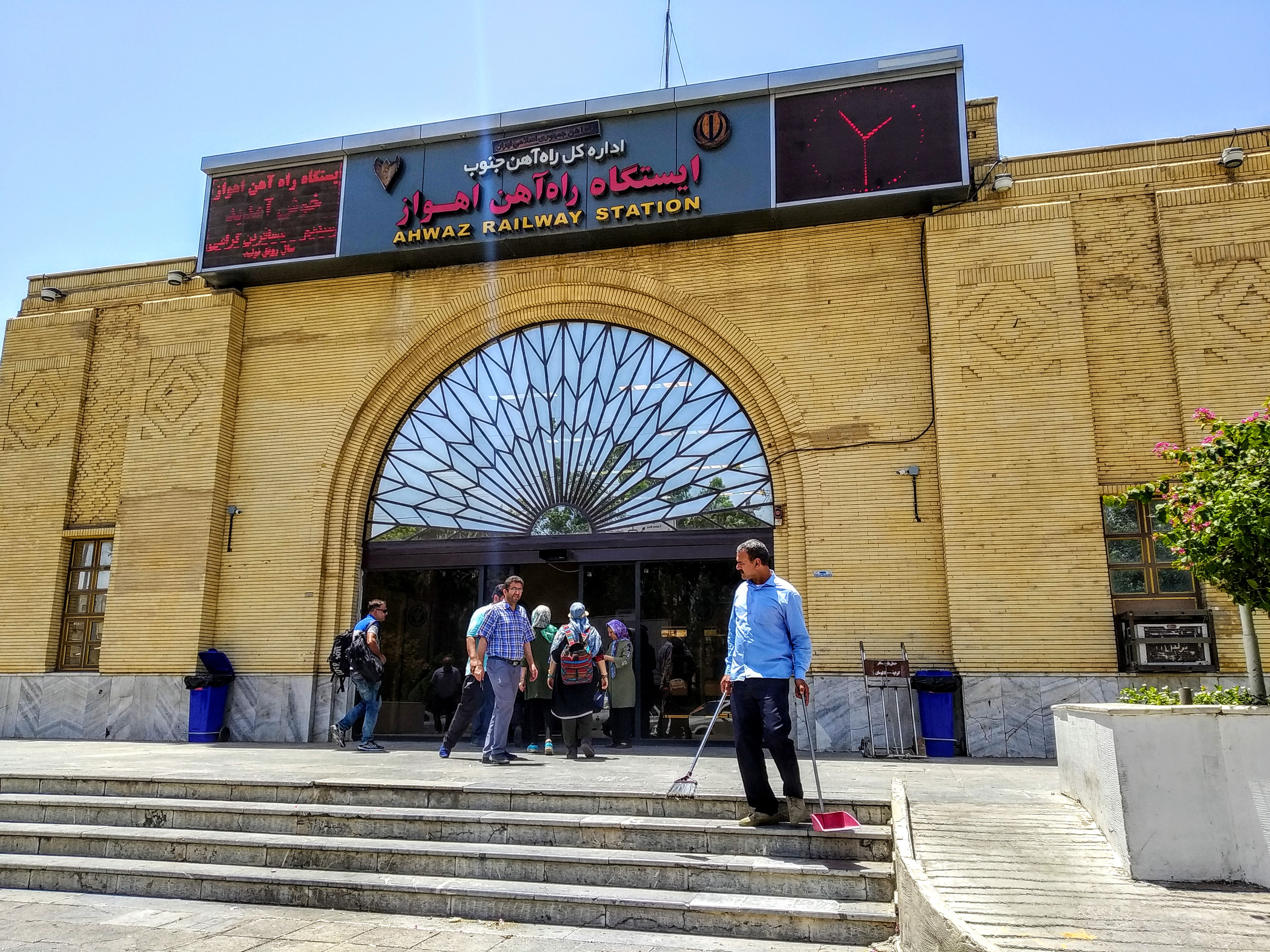

General information
- Location: Districts 2 and 6, Ahvaz, Ahvaz County, Khuzestan; Iran
- Coordinates: 31.3239382°N 48.6640584°E
- System: IRI Railway station
Location

Ahvaz railway station (Persian: ايستگاه راه آهن اهواز, romanized: Istgah-e Rah Ahan-e Ahvaz) is located in Ahvaz, Khuzestan Province. The station is owned by IRI Railway. This is the oldest of the two railway stations in the city of Ahvaz, with the other one being Karun railway station.

== Service summary ==
Note: Classifications are unofficial and only to best reflect the type of service offered on each path
Meaning of Classifications:

- Local Service: Services originating from a major city, and running outwards, with stops at all stations
- Regional Service: Services connecting two major centres, with stops at almost all stations
- InterRegio Service: Services connecting two major centres, with stops at major and some minor stations
- InterRegio-Express Service:Services connecting two major centres, with stops at major stations
- InterCity Service: Services connecting two (or more) major centres, with no stops in between, with the sole purpose of connecting said centres.

Preceding station	IRI Railways	Following station
Terminus	Ahvaz - Andimeshk Local Service	Haft Tappeh towards Andimeshk
Terminus	Ahvaz - Khorramshahr Local Service	Hamid towards Khorramshahr
Haft Tappeh towards Tehran	Tehran - Ahvaz Regional Service	Terminus
Terminus	Ahvaz - Mashhad InterRegio-Express Service	Andimeshk towards Mashhad
