= Salmas railway station =

Salmas Railway Station ايستگاه راه آهن سلماس

General information
- Other names: Qarah Tappeh (قره تپه)
- Location: Salmas - Khoy Hwy, Salmas, West Azerbaijan; Iran
Location

Qareh Tappeh Railway Station ايستگاه راه اهن قره تپه
- Village/railway station
- Location within Iran
- Coordinates: 38°19′50″N 44°49′40″E
- Country: Iran
- Province: West Azerbaijan
- County: Salmas
- Bakhsh: Central
- Rural District: Koreh Soni

Population (2006)
  - Total: 119
- Time zone: UTC+3:30 (IRST)
  - Summer (DST): UTC+4:30 (IRDT)

Salmas railway station (Persian: ايستگاه راه آهن سلماس, romanized: Istgah-e Rah Ahan-e Salmas), also referred to as Qareh Tappeh Railway Station (Persian: ايستگاه راه اهن قره تپه, romanized: Īstgāh-e Rāh Āhan-e Qareh Tappeh) is a village and railway station in Koreh Soni Rural District, in the Central District of Salmas County, West Azerbaijan Province, Iran. At the 2006 census, its population was 119, in 26 families. The station is located 11 km north of Salmas, the city it is primarily intended to serve, 26 km south of the city of Khoy, and 20 km southwest of Khoy Airport. The station is owned by IRI Railway.

== Service summary ==
Note: Classifications are unofficial and only to best reflect the type of service offered on each path
Meaning of Classifications:

- Local Service: Services originating from a major city, and running outwards, with stops at all stations
- Regional Service: Services connecting two major centres, with stops at almost all stations
- InterRegio Service: Services connecting two major centres, with stops at major and some minor stations
- InterRegio-Express Service: Services connecting two major centres, with stops at major stations
- InterCity Service: Services connecting two (or more) major centres, with no stops in between, with the sole purpose of connecting said centres.

Preceding station	Azerbaijan Commuter Railway	Following station
Cheshmeh Kanan towards Tabriz	Tabriz - Salmas	Terminus
Preceding station	IRI Railways	Following station
Sharafkhaneh towards Tabriz	Tabriz - Razi InterRegio Service	Razi Terminus
