= Azarbaijan Shahid Madani University =

University in Iran

Azarbaijan Shahid Madani University (ASMU)
- دانشگاه شهید مدنی آذربایجان; Daneshgah-e Shahid-e Midâni-ye Âzerbaijan
- Azarbaijan University coat of arms
- Former names: Tabriz University of Tarbiat Moallem, Azarbaijan University of Tarbiat Moallem
- Type: Public University
- Established: 1987
- Chancellor: Mohammad Bagher Mohammad Sadeghi Azad
- Academic staff: 237
- Administrative staff: 213
- Students: 7500
- Location: 35 km of Tabriz – Azarshahr Road, Tabriz, East Azarbaijan Province, Iran; 37°48′44.46″N 45°56′56.19″E
- Campus: Suburb, Urban
- Colours: blue
- Website: en2.azaruniv.ac.ir

Azarbaijan Shahid Madani University, (Persian: دانشگاه شهید مدنی آذربایجان, Danushgah-e Shihid-e Midâni-ye Âzerbaijan) commonly called only Azarbaijan University, is a public university located near Tabriz, East Azerbaijan province, Iran, founded in 1987. The university provides both undergraduate and graduate education to approximately 7,500 students at a wide range of fields including engineering, basic sciences, literature and theology. The university has got Research Gate's total impact point of 1716.47 from 61 publications, according to the latest statistics.

== History ==
Azarbaijan University was founded in 1987 in Tabriz as a branch of Tehran's Tarbiat Moallem (teacher education) University. The initial objective of the university was to train teachers for high schools and technical schools. In 1988, Azarbaijan University became an independent university under the title Tabriz University of Tarbiat Moallem and later Azarbaijan University of Tarbiat Moallem. In 2012, due to changing of Iranian educational policies, the university turned to a general educational university under the title Azarbaijan Shahid Madani University.

== Faculties ==
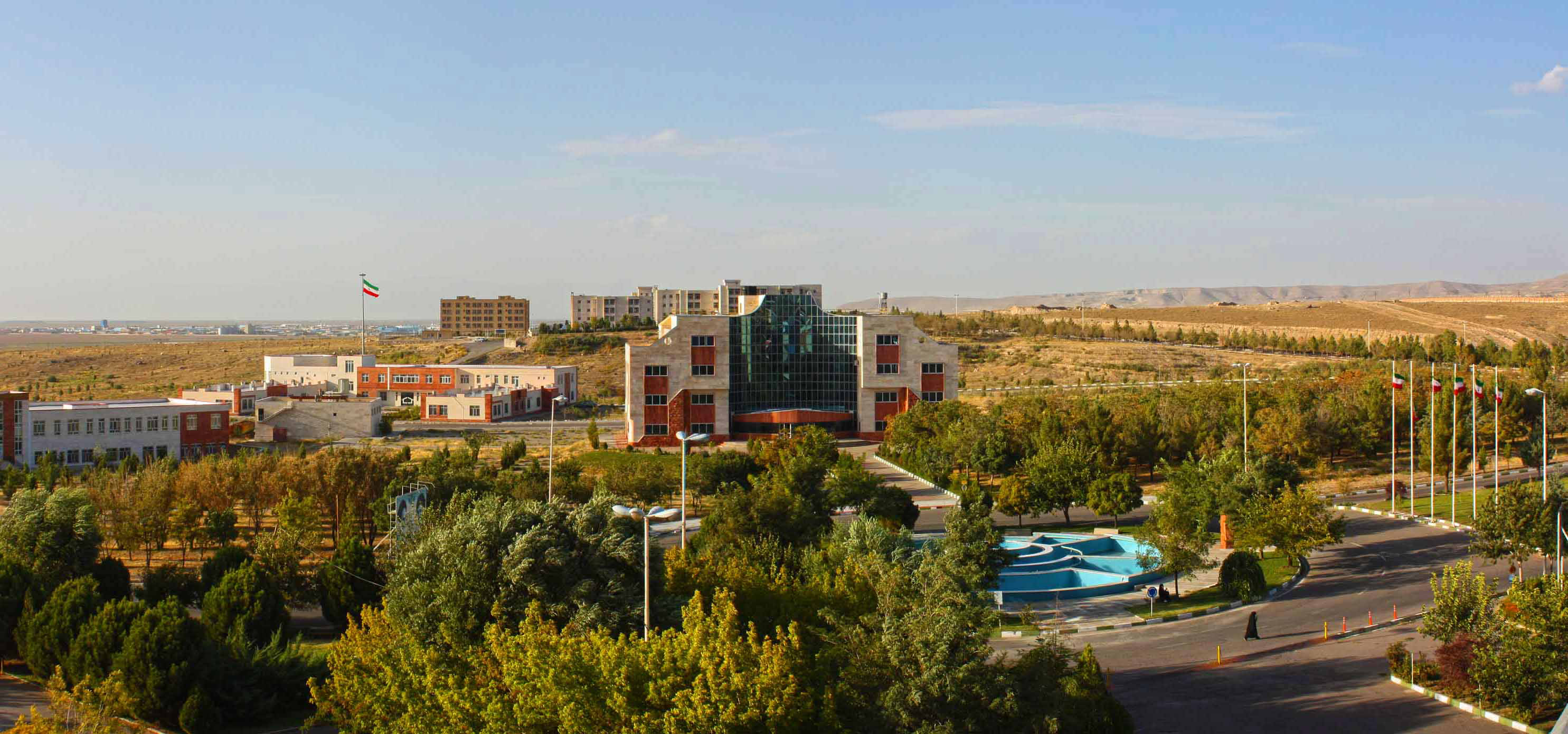
Central Library

- Engineering
- Basic Sciences
- Literature and Human Sciences
- Theology and Islamic Sciences
- Information Technology
- Psychology & Educational Sciences
- Agriculture

== Campuses ==
Azarbaijan University has two campuses:

- Main campus is located in the countryside of Tabriz alongside the Tabriz – Maragheh highway, near Azarshahr and Mamaqan, 35 km Southwest of Tabriz.
- Tabriz campus, which is located in Dampezeshki neighborhood of Tabriz, was established in 2013 with a focus on graduate studies in some of the theoretical engineering and science majors. The programs in Tabriz campus include Master of Science in: Analytical Chemistry, Theoretical Physics, Structural Engineering, Electrical Power Engineering, Applied Mathematics and PhD degree programs in: Analytical Chemistry, Atomic and Molecular Physics. Tabriz Campus holds the "Virtual and Distance Learning Center" of the university and also summer and short courses are held in this campus.

== International Relations ==
Azarbaijan Shahid Madani University has cooperation and exchange programs with universities and institutes in the Middle East and also in Asia and Europe. Some of them are as follows:

- Kanazawa University in Japan
- Khazar University in Azerbaijan
- Gebze Technical University in Turkey
- Siirt University in Turkey
- Van Yüzüncü Yıl University in Turkey
- BBCA Institute in Italy

== Student Communities ==
There are student communities and associations with academic, athletic or artistic objects.

== Exclusive Train ==
Tabriz – Azarbaijan SHahid Madani University train

Thanks to the Tehran – Tabriz railroad which passes through the university, Azarbaijan University is the only university in Iran with a railway station inside which transports students between Tabriz and the university.

== See also ==
- Higher education in Iran
- List of universities in Iran
