= Jolfa railway station =

Railway station in Jolfa, Iran

Jolfa Railway Station ايستگاه راه آهن جلفا
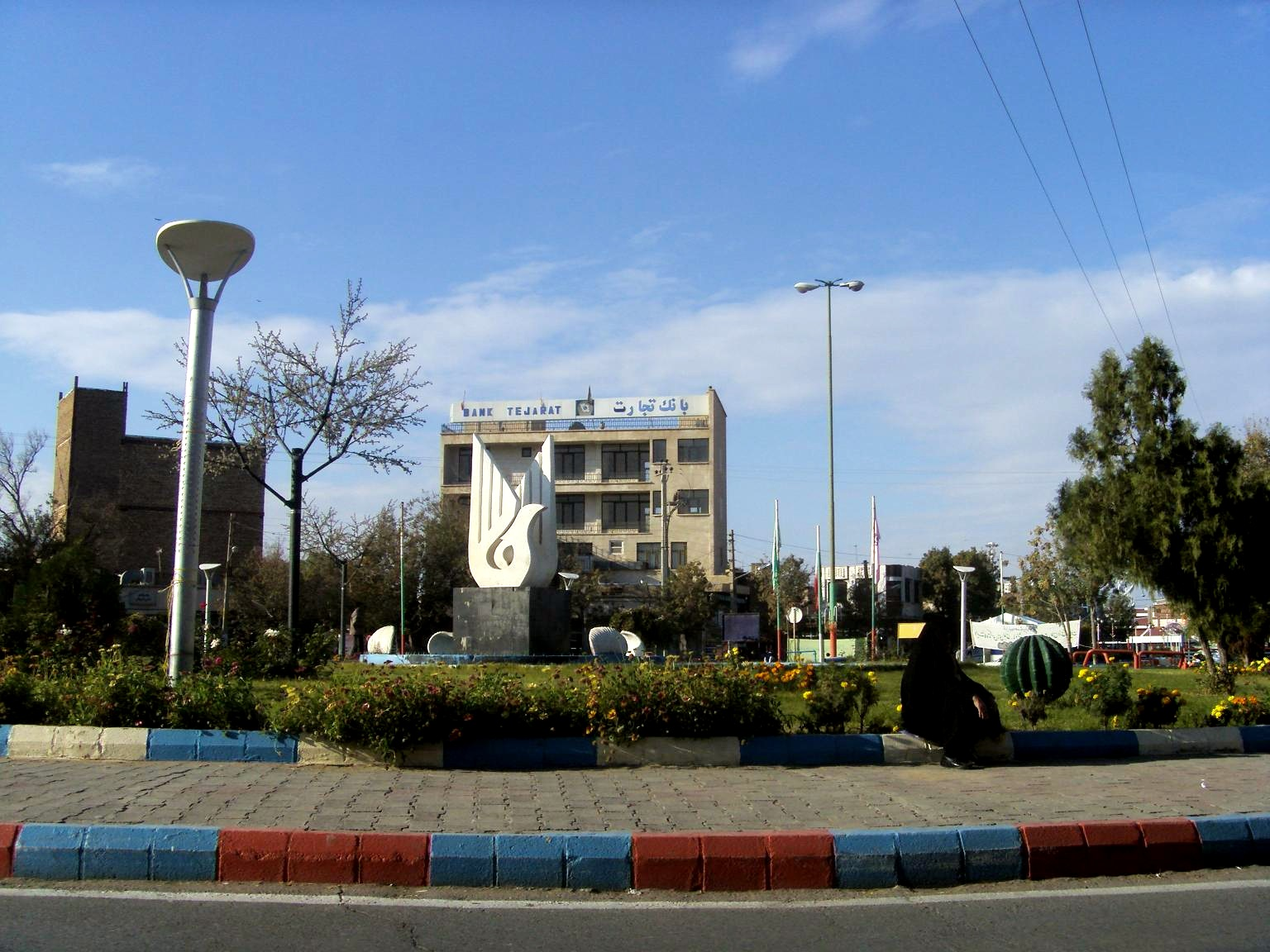
- Jolfa railway station

General information
- Location: Jolfa, Jolfa, East Azerbaijan; Iran
- Coordinates: 38.9377297°N 45.6300897°E

Services
Preceding station	Azerbaijan Commuter Railway	Following station
Gargar towards Tabriz	Tabriz - Jolfa	Terminus
Location

Jolfa railway station (Persian: ايستگاه راه آهن جلفا, romanized: Istgah-e Rah Ahan-e Jolfâ) is located in Jolfa, East Azerbaijan Province. The station is owned by IRI Railway.
