= Emamzadeh (Pishva) railway station, Emamzadeh =

Railway station in Tehran Province, Iran

Emamzadeh Railway Station ايستگاه راه آهن امامزاده

General information
- Location: Varamin, Varamin, Tehran; Iran
- Coordinates: 35.2957644°N 51.7315828°E

Services
Preceding station	Tehran Commuter Railways	Following station
Pishva towards Tehran	Tehran - Pishva - Garmsar	Terminus
Location

Emamzadeh railway station (Persian: ايستگاه راه آهن امامزاده, romanized: Istgah-e Rah Ahan-e Emamzadeh) is located in Varamin, Tehran Province. The station is owned by IRI Railway.
