= Shiraz railway station =

Railway station in Shiraz, Iran

Shiraz Railway Station ايستگاه راه آهن شیراز
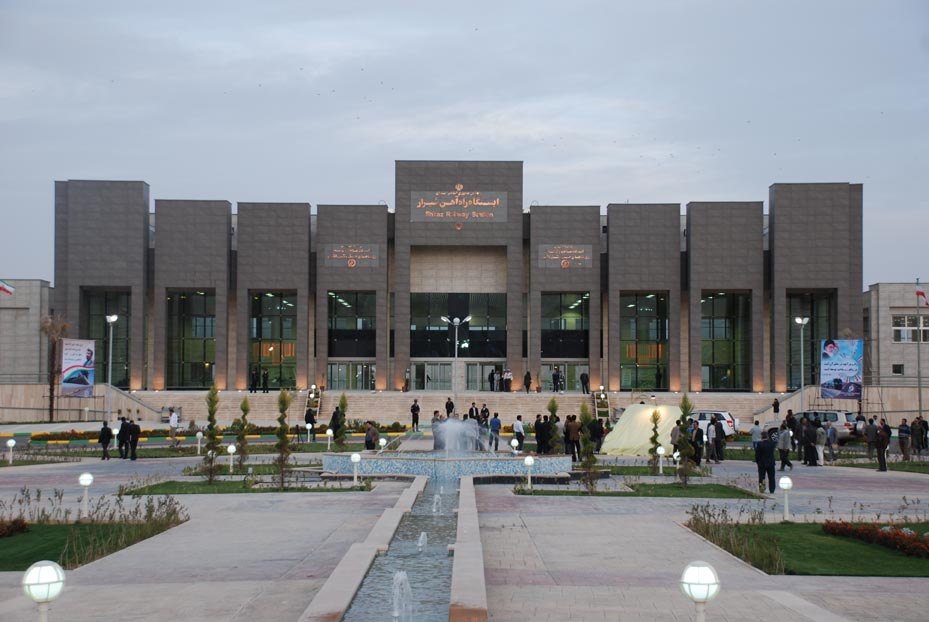

General information
- Location: Iran
- Coordinates: 29.7645737°N 52.4324356°E
- System: IRI Railway station
- Connections: Shiraz City Buses: 37 Qasrodasht-Guyom; 50 Qasrodasht-Qalat; 56 Qasrodasht-Qasr-e Qomsheh
Location

Shiraz railway station (Persian: ايستگاه راه آهن شیراز, romanized: Istgah-e Rah Ahan-e Shiraz) is located in Shiraz, Fars province. The station is owned by IRI Railway. The station has been criticized for its distance from the city's central parts.

There are plans to have a Local Service connecting this station to Marvdasht in the future.

== Service summary ==
Note: Classifications are unofficial and only to best reflect the type of service offered on each path
Meaning of Classifications:

- Local Service: Services originating from a major city, and running outwards, with stops at all stations
- Regional Service: Services connecting two major centres, with stops at almost all stations
- InterRegio Service: Services connecting two major centres, with stops at major and some minor stations
- InterRegio-Express Service:Services connecting two major centres, with stops at major stations
- InterCity Service: Services connecting two (or more) major centres, with no stops in between, with the sole purpose of connecting said centres.

Preceding station	IRI Railways	Following station
Terminus	Shiraz - Mashhad InterRegio Service	Marvdasht towards Mashhad
Terminus	Shiraz - Tehran InterRegio Service	Marvdasht towards Tehran
