= Parand railway station =

Railway station in Robat Karim, Iran

Parand Railway Station ايستگاه راه آهن پرند

General information
- Location: Robat Karim, Robat Karim, Tehran; Iran
- Coordinates: 35.463688°N 50.977858°E

Services
Preceding station	Tehran Commuter Railways	Following station
Robat Karim towards Tehran	Tehran - Parand	Terminus
Preceding station	Tehran Metro	Following station
Shahr-e Forudgahi-e Imam Khomeini towards Shahed - Bagher Shahr	Line 1 Under Construction	Terminus
Location

Parand railway station (Persian: ايستگاه راه آهن پرند, romanized: Istgah-e Rah Ahan-e Parand) is located in Parand, Tehran Province. The station is owned by IRI Railway.
