= Tabriz railway station =

Railway station in Tabriz, Iran

Tabriz ايستگاه راه اهن تبریز
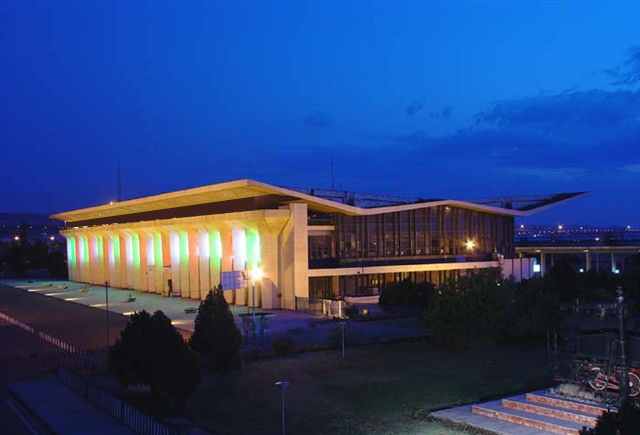

General information
- Location: Tabriz, Tabriz County, Easy Azerbaijan province, Iran
- Coordinates: 38°04′19.49″N 46°13′42.95″E
- System: Islamic Republic of Iran Railways station
- Connections: Tabriz City Buses: BRT1 Rahahan-Basij; 108 Sardrud; 120 Shahid Beheshti; 124 Qaramalek; 132 Shahrak-e Andisheh; 134 Kuy-e Laleh; 145 Kojaabad - Bagh-e Ma'ruf; 164 Esfahlan; 173 Sahand
Location

Tabriz railway station (Persian: ايستگاه راه اهن تبریز) is a structure in the city of Tabriz, Iran; the current building was built during the Pahlavi era. It was jointly designed by French architect Fernand Pouillon and Iranian architect Heydar Ghiaï-Chamlou and built in the 1950s.

== History ==
The first railroad arriving in Tabriz had been built by Russians during the height of World War I. The first train arrived in Tabriz in March 1916 from Jolfa. The railway stretched from Tabriz to Tehran in 1958, with a length of 748 km.

== Service summary ==
Note: Classifications are unofficial and only to best reflect the type of service offered on each path
Meaning of Classifications:

- Local Service: Services originating from a major city, and running outwards, with stops at all stations
- Regional Service: Services connecting two major centres, with stops at almost all stations
- InterRegio Service: Services connecting two major centres, with stops at major and some minor stations
- InterRegio-Express Service: Services connecting two major centres, with stops at major stations
- InterCity Service: Services connecting two (or more) major centres, with no stops in between, with the sole purpose of connecting said centres.

Preceding station	Azerbaijan Commuter Railway	Following station
Terminus	Tabriz - Jolfa	Sahlan towards Jolfa
Terminus	Tabriz - Salmas	Sahlan towards Salmas
Terminus	Tabriz - Tarbiat-e Mo'allem	Zeraei towards Tarbiat-e Mo'allem
Preceding station	IRI Railways	Following station
Terminus	Tabriz - Mashhad InterRegio Service	Maragheh towards Mashhad
Ajab Shir towards Tehran	Tehran - Tabriz InterRegio Service	Terminus
Terminus	Tabriz - Razi InterRegio Service	Sharafkhaneh towards Razi

== Gallery ==
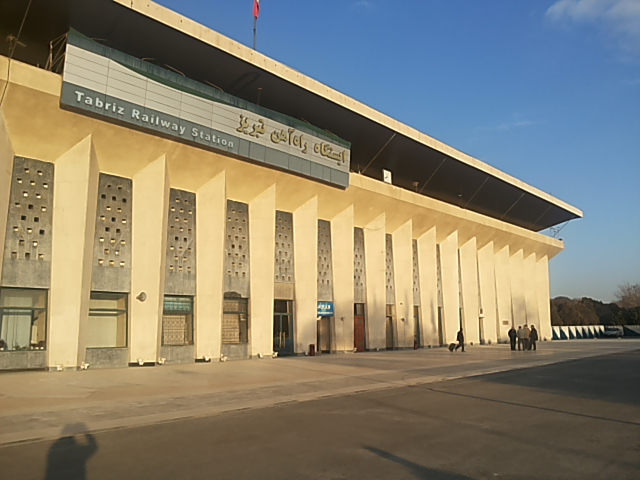
Exterior view

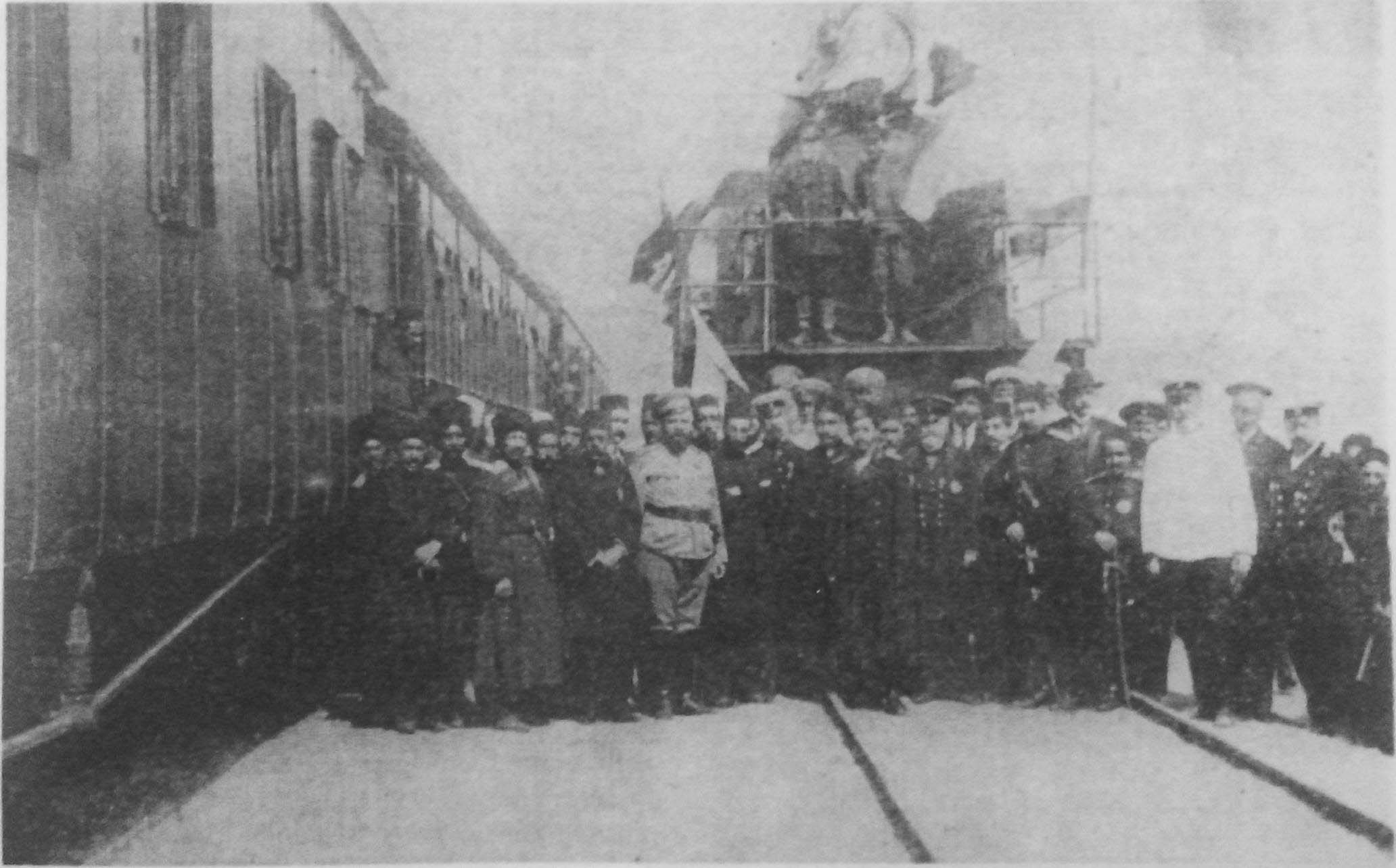
Tabriz train station, late Qajar era
