= Tehran railway station =

Railway station in Tehran, Iran

Tehran Railway Station ايستگاه راه آهن تهران
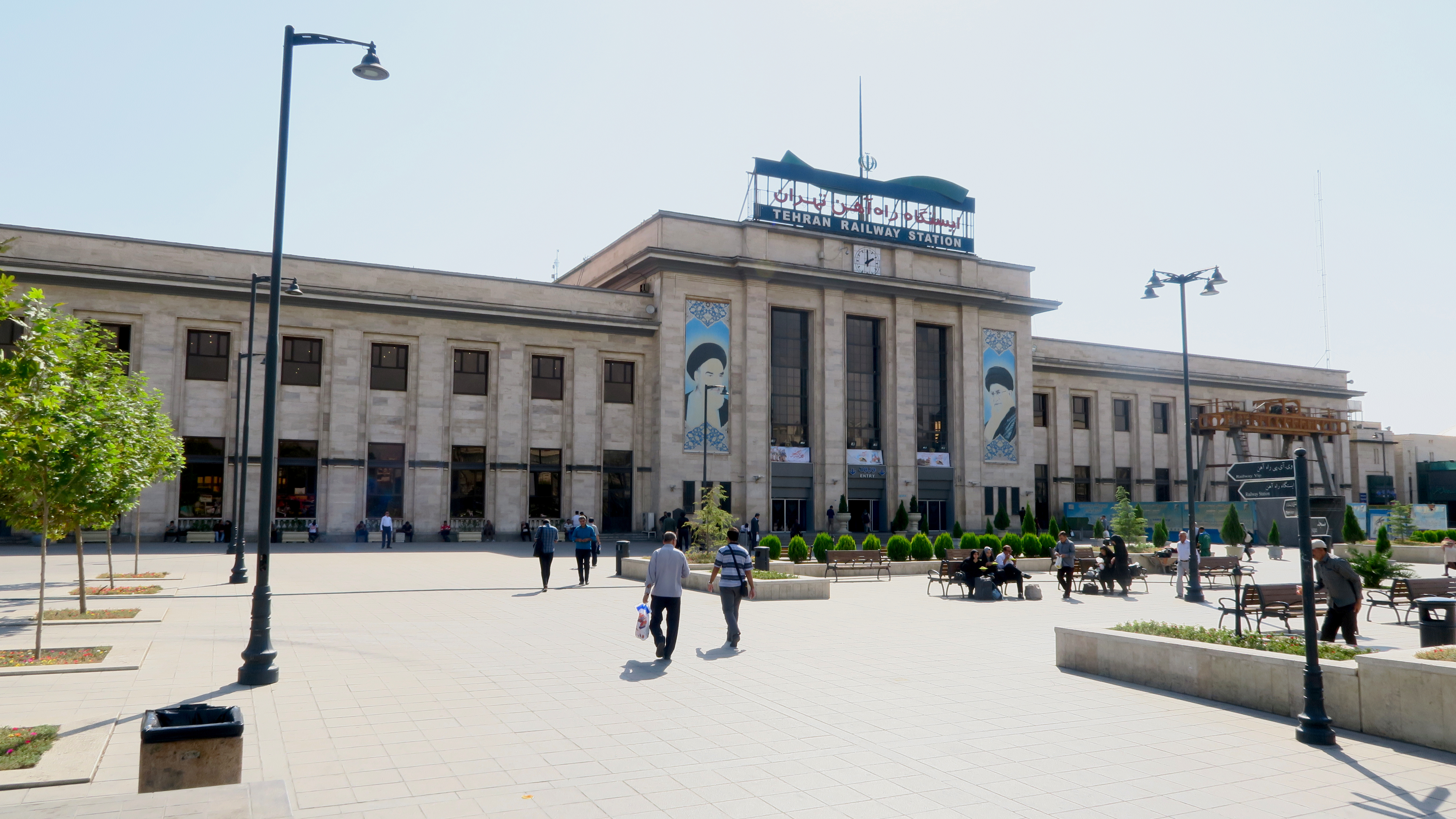
- The station building in 2018

General information
- Location: District 16, Tehran, Tehran Province; Iran
- Coordinates: 35°39′29″N 51°23′52″E
- System: Railway station
- Operator: Islamic Republic of Iran Railways
- Connections: Rahahan Metro Station Tehran BRT: BRT 7 · 105 Rahahan-Tajrish · 151 Rahahan-Valiasr Sq. · 152 Rahahan-Parkway; Tehran Buses: 245 Rahahan-Naziabad-Shahr-e Rey Metro; 246 Rahahan-Khazaneh-Shahr-e Rey Metro; 258 Javadieh-Fayyazbakhsh Term.; 259 Shahrak-e Valfajr-Moein Term.; 275 Imam Khomeini Hospital-Moein Term.; 320 Rahahan-Khorasan Sq.; 330 Rahahan-Parking Shahr-e Rey; 336 Rahahan-Qods Blvd.; 349 Rahahan-Mahallati Exp'way; 359 Rahahan-Haft-e Tir; 365 Khaniabad-e No-Enqelab Sq.; 366 Vesal Blvd.-Enqelab Sq.; 367 Terminal-e Jonub-Enqelab Sq.; 417 Sarvari Term.-Fayyazbakhsh Term.; 430 Rahahan-Shahr-e Aftab; 907 Rahahan-Tajrish; 911 Rahahan-Emam Hossein Sq.

Construction
- Architect: K.T. Seest

History
- Opened: 1930
Location

Tehran Railway Station (Persian: ايستگاه راه آهن تهران, romanized: Istgah-e Rah Ahan-e Tehran) is located in Rah Ahan Square, at the foot of Valiasr Street in the southern part of Tehran, Iran. The railway station was originally designed in 1928–29 by Polish architect Władysław Horodecki, who died before the construction could begin. In 1930, the experienced Danish railway architect Knud Tanggaard Seest was then tasked to finish the project. Around the time it opened in 1930, the previous tram system in Tehran was shut down. Seest changed the original plans dramatically and gave the railway station a new, highly modern, strict design. The Tehran Railway Station serves as an example of early modernistic architecture in West Asia.

== Service summary ==
Note: Classifications are unofficial and only to best reflect the type of service offered on each path
Meaning of Classifications:

- Local Service: Services originating from a major city, and running outwards, with stops at all stations
- Regional Service: Services connecting two major centres, with stops at almost all stations
- InterRegio Service: Services connecting two major centres, with stops at major and some minor stations
- InterRegio-Express Service:Services connecting two major centres, with stops at major stations
- InterCity Service: Services connecting two (or more) major centres, with no stops in between, with the sole purpose of connecting said centres.
- International Service: Nakhchivan — Mashhad speed train No. 15/16 operated by Azerbaijan Railways

Preceding station	Tehran Commuter Railways	Following station
Terminus	Tehran - Parand	Tappeh Sefid towards Parand
Terminus	Tehran - Jamkaran	Tappeh Sefid towards Jamkaran
Terminus	Tehran - Qom	Qom Terminus
Terminus	Tehran - Pishva - Garmsar	Qarchak towards Emamzadeh (Pishva) or Garmsar
Terminus	Tehran - Hashtgerd - Qazvin	Shahr-e Qods towards Hashtgerd, Qazvin or Takestan
Preceding station	IRI Railways	Following station
Terminus	Tehran - Ahvaz Regional Service	Tappeh Sefid towards Ahvaz
Terminus	Tehran - Gorgan Regional Service	Varamin towards Gorgan
Terminus	Tehran - Mashhad Regional Service	Varamin towards Mashhad
Qom towards Ahvaz	Ahvaz - Mashhad InterRegio-Express Service	Shahrud towards Mashhad
Karaj Terminus	Karaj - Mashhad InterRegio Service	Semnan towards Mashhad
Qazvin Terminus	Qazvin - Mashhad InterRegio-Express Service	Shahrud towards Mashhad
Karaj towards Tabriz	Tabriz - Mashhad InterRegio Service	Semnan towards Mashhad
Terminus	Tehran - Bandarabbas InterRegio Service	Mohammadieh towards Bandarabbas
Terminus	Tehran - Bandarabbas InterRegio-Express Service	Mohammadieh towards Bandarabbas
Terminus	Tehran - Khaf InterRegio Service	Pishva towards Khaf
Terminus	Tehran - Mahabad InterRegio Service	Qazvin towards Mahabad
Terminus	Tehran - Maragheh InterRegio Service	Qazvin towards Maragheh
Terminus	Tehran - Mashhad InterRegio Service	Varamin towards Mashhad
Terminus	Tehran - Mashhad InterRegio-Express Service	Semnan towards Mashhad
Terminus	Tehran - Mashhad InterRegio Service; Regional Service at Sabzevar Area	Semnan towards Mashhad
Terminus	Tehran - Mianeh InterRegio Service	Karaj towards Mianeh
Terminus	Tehran - Semnan InterRegio Service	Varamin towards Semnan
Terminus	Tehran - Shiraz InterRegio Service	Mohammadieh towards Shiraz
Terminus	Tehran - Tabas InterRegio Service	Varamin towards Tabas
Terminus	Tehran - Tabriz InterRegio Service	Qazvin towards Tabriz
Terminus	Tehran - Yazd InterRegio Service	Mohammadieh towards Yazd
Terminus	Tehran - Zanjan InterRegio Service	Karaj towards Zanjan
Terminus	Tehran - Rasht InterRegio Service	Karaj towards Rasht
Terminus	Tehran - Zahedan InterCity Service	Yazd towards Zahedan
Terminus	Tehran - Mashhad InterCity Service	Mashhad Terminus
Terminus	Tehran - Neishabur - Mashhad InterCity Service	Neishabur towards Mashhad
Terminus	Tehran - Semnan Province - Mashhad InterCity Service	Semnan towards Mashhad
Karaj Terminus	Karaj - Mashhad InterCity Service	Mashhad Terminus
Zanjan Terminus	Zanjan - Mashhad InterCity Service	Mashhad Terminus

== Gallery ==
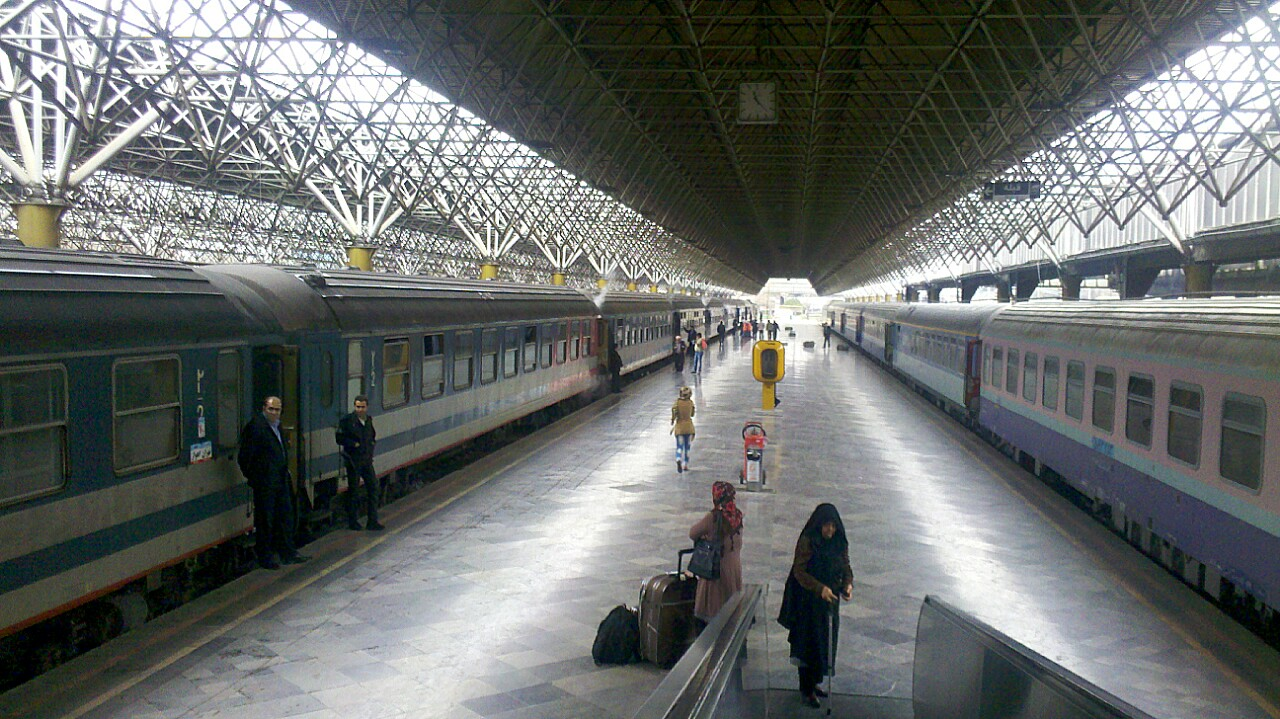
Platforms

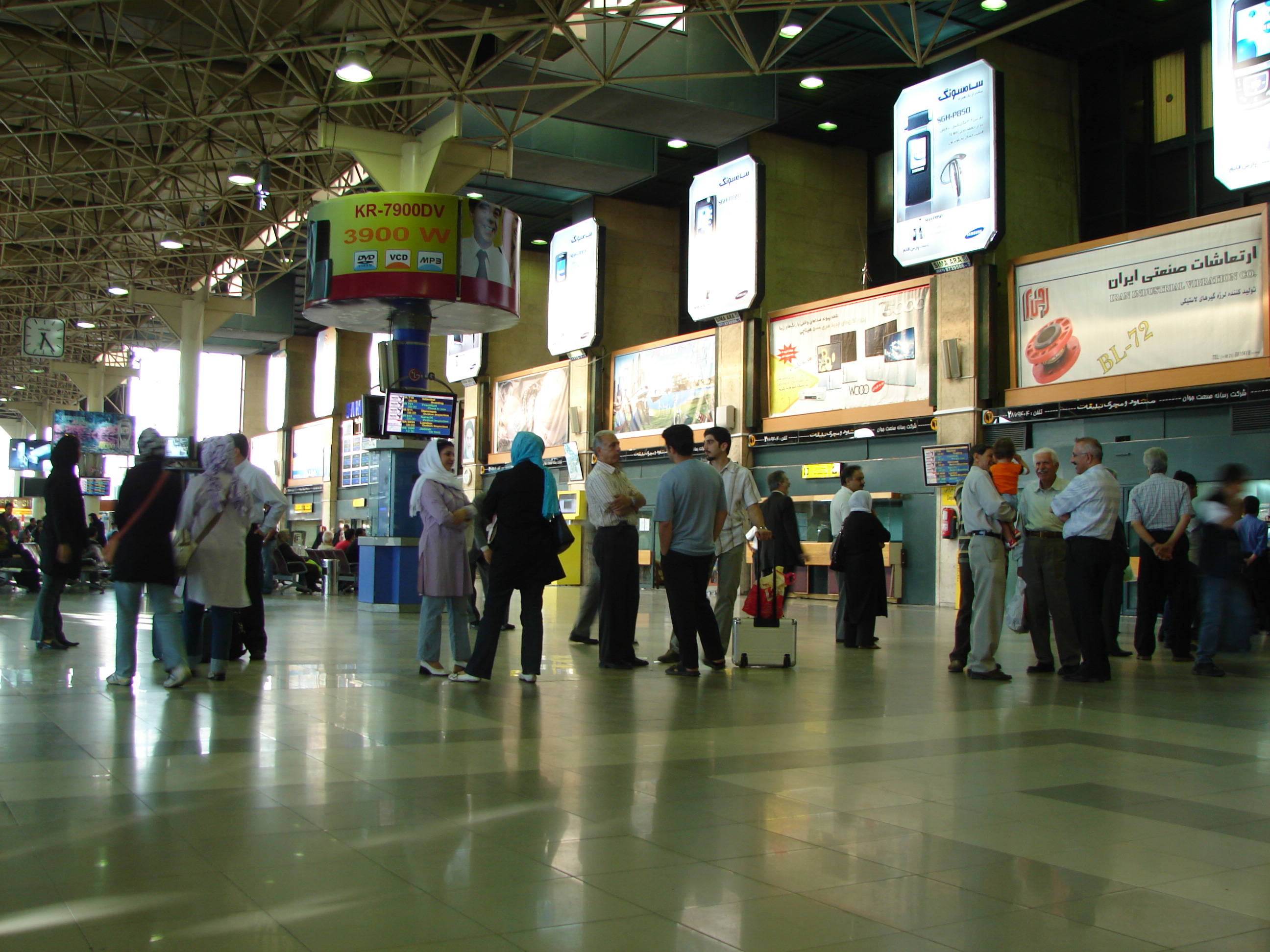
Hall

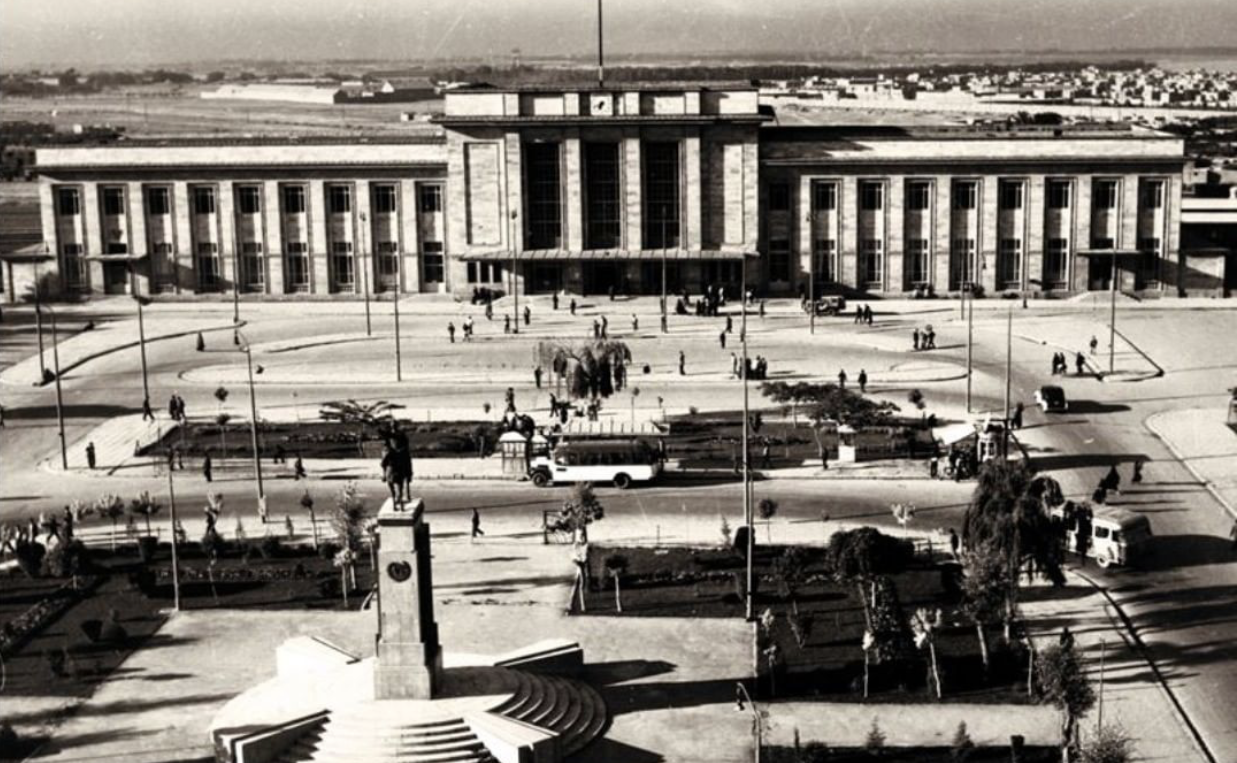
The railway station in 1930

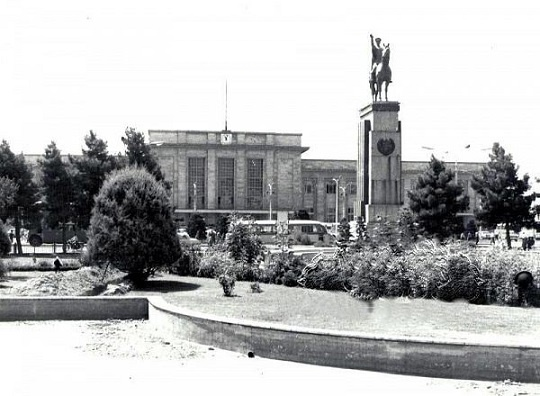
The railway station in the 1940s

== See also ==
- Rahahan Metro Station
- List of Tehran Metro stations
