= Mashhad railway station =

Railway station in Mashhad, Iran

Mashhad Shahid Raeisi Railway Station ایستگاه راه‌آهن شهید رئیسی مشهد

General information
- Location: Iran
- Coordinates: 32.5501941°N 51.6961992°E
- System: IRI Railway station
- Connections: Railway St. Metro Station

History
- Opened: 1957
Location

Mashhad Shahid Raeisi railway station (Persian: ایستگاه راه‌آهن شهید رئیسی مشهد), formerly Mashhad railway station (Persian: ايستگاه راه آهن مشهد, romanized: Istgah-e Rah Ahan-e Mashhad) is located in Mashhad, Razavi Khorasan province, the second largest city in Iran. The station is owned by IRI Railways, and was designed by Heydar Ghiai.

Following the 2024 Varzaqan helicopter crash, it was renamed in memory of the late President Ebrahim Raisi.

== Design and Opening ==
Mashhad railway station was opened by Mohammad Reza Shah and Queen Soraya Esfandiary-Bakhtiary on 2 May 1957, with the arrival of the royal train. Since Khorasan is the land of the Parthians and Mashhad is close to their original capital (Parten Nesa), this structure was designed inspired by Parthian architecture (Hatra Palace).

The station has an elongated plan with two rows of oval concrete columns on two axes, and a wavy roof is mounted on them. There are two wide side columns inside the space. The result of this design was an open and integrated interior space, which the sequence of columns, the contrast of concrete and glass, and how the light enters from inside, added to the splendor and sense of peace of the space. Upon entering, this building greets the travelers with a suspended and huge ceiling, and then passing through an array of columns, it reaches a hall with a high arch, which creates greatness in the viewer's mind. Mashhad railway station has been the most prominent building belonging to contemporary architectural trends in Mashhad.

== Symbol ==
The crown symbol in front of the station is a reference to Afsharid hats and Nader Shah's crown. It was designed by Yaghoob Danesh Doost.

== Park ==
Railroad Square and Boulevard is one of the greenest and most beautiful parks and recreation areas in Mashhad. In 2017, during the Taghizade Khamesi municipality period, with the aim of redefining and transforming it into an urban arena space (plaza) and using the potential of the lower levels of the area, it was put on the agenda of Mashhad urban management, and the symbol of the sq. returned to its original form.

== Connections ==
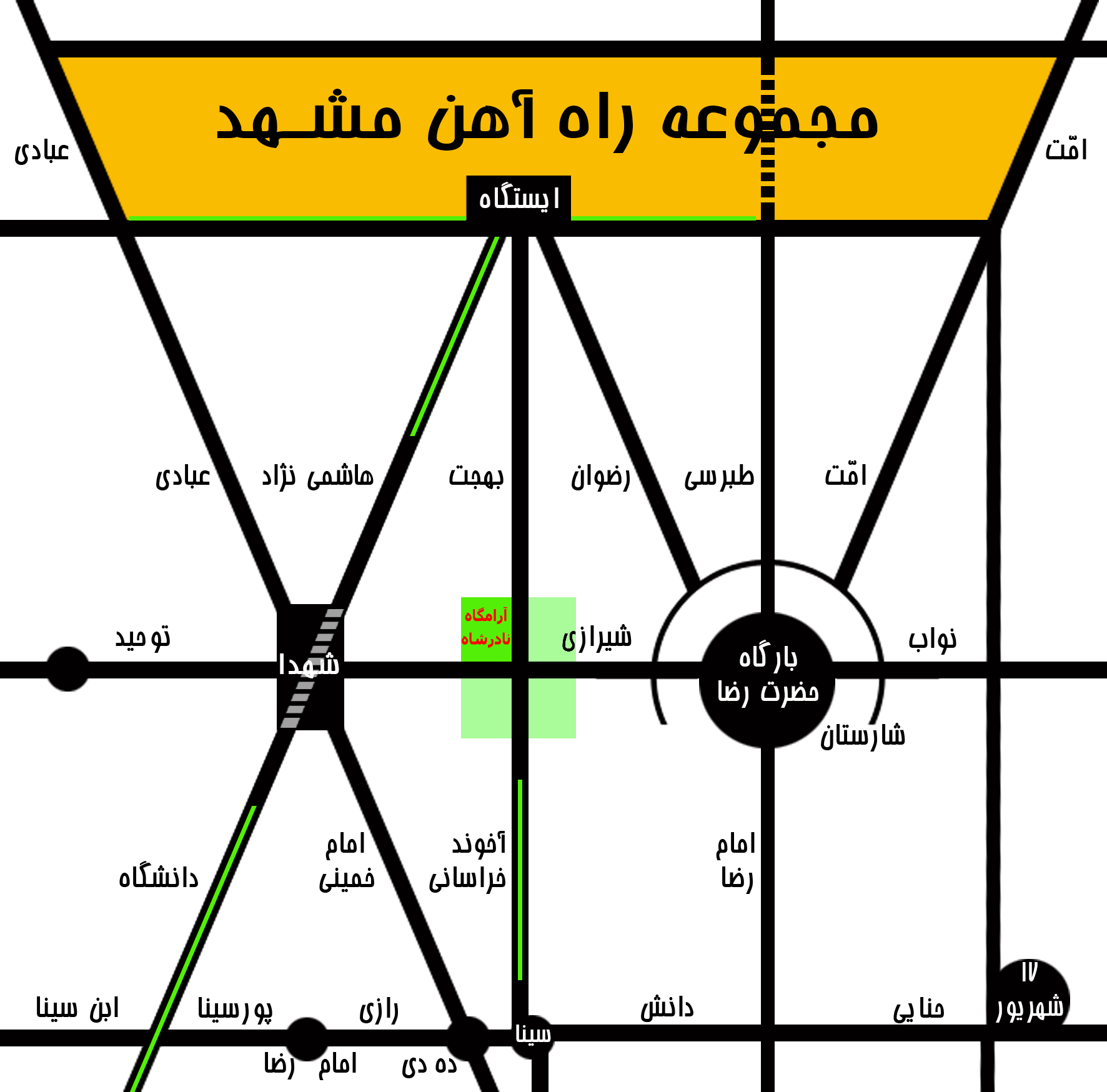
Mashhad Rail-way Station Connections

The three crossings of Mashhad Railway Square are:

- Hashminejad Street (former Foozia) leading to Koohsangi,
- Behjat St. (former Hospital Alley, Shah Reza, Azadi) leading to Sina Hospital and Central Post Office,
- Rezvan Blvd. (former Beyhaghghi) leading to Razavi Shrine.

The streets and boulevard around the Mashhad railway are:

- The railway boulevard (currently named after Sayyid Reza Kamyab) is a wide and green boulevard that has a park line and a long recreational space,
- Ayatollah Ebadi St. (former Nader Kalat Road and Khaaje Rabi),
- Ommat Blvd. ,
- Majlesi Blvd.

Also, Tabarsi St. has been crossed through the railway area as an underpass.

== Turbo Train ==
The increasing and ever-growing speed of trains and the emergence of high-speed trains, due to the significantly lower formalities, fuel costs, and depreciation of trains compared to the duration of formalities, fuel costs, and maintenance of airplanes, means that for distances of about a thousand kilometers, train transportation replaces air travel and reduces air traffic. In 1975 (2535 Imperial Calendar), on the eve of the fiftieth anniversary of the establishment of the Pahlavi dynasty, it was decided that the Tehran↔Mashhad railway line should be implemented as a Shinkansen-type line (Shinkansen of Japan and TGV of France) with two tracks for two-way travel.

In the first step of this vision, a significant and immediate reduction in travel time to Mashhad was made possible by purchasing four 5-car RTG turbo trains from ANF-Frangeco, France. The Turbo Train was a high-speed train with a turbine engine, used on intercity railway lines in France in 1967, paving the way for the creation of the French high-speed train system (Train à Grande Vitesse). Four RTG Class T 2000 units (a type compatible with the Iranian railway system) with a speed of 160 km/h were purchased by Iranian State Railway from France and put into operation on the Tehran-Mashhad route in 1976 (2535 Imperial Calendar). Iran's TurboTrains were the first fast passenger trains in Iran, offering two major advantages: a significant reduction in Tehran-Mashhad travel time, from over 16 hours to about 8 hours and 30 minutes. The second was the luxurious first-class travel experience, with meal and light beverage service at the seats, which was not available on other trains. Services were provided by trained hostesses in elegant blue uniforms with knowledge of at least one foreign language. These stylish and well-equipped trains, although not compartment-based, allowed passengers to travel from Tehran to Mashhad in 8 hours without fatigue due to excellent catering, professional hostesses, and a pleasant social environment.

For the trains to operate at 120 km/h, a rapid track upgrade program and some minor modifications were necessary. The integration, re-ballasting, re-alignment, track enclosure in some sections, some re-modernization, and service road construction were carried out by the French company Secmafer in three months.

== Shinkansen-type Rail Line and Electric Train ==
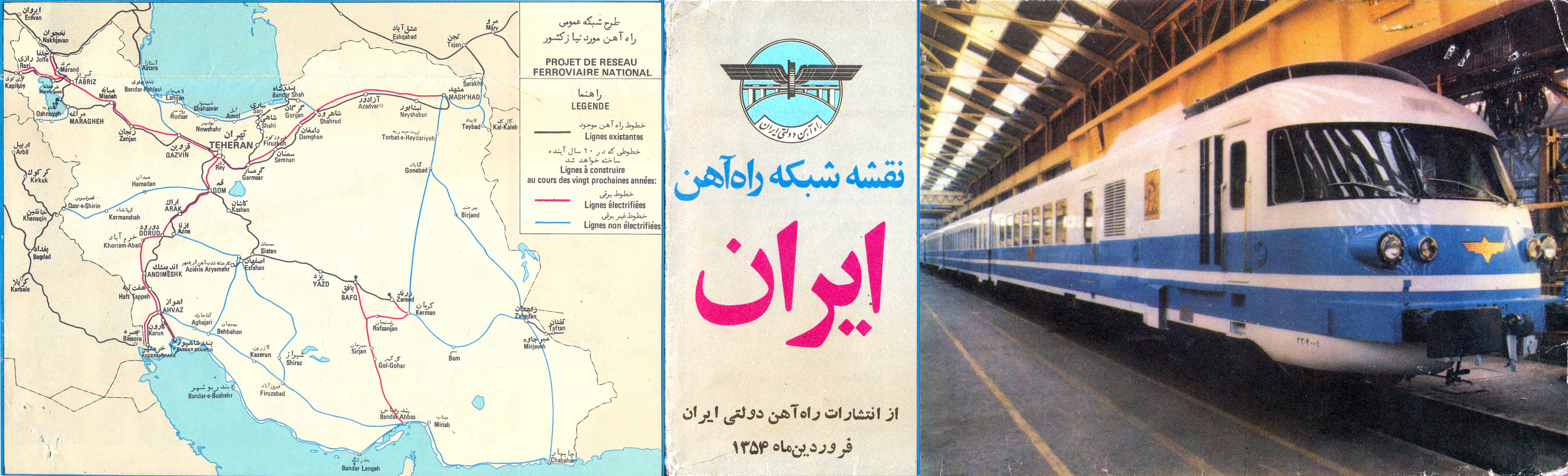
Map of Iran's electrified and non-electrified railway network - March 1975 (until 1995), image of one of the Tehran↔Mashhad Turbo Trains, and the new logo of the Iranian State Railway

After the launch of the high-speed Turbo trains on the Tehran↔Mashhad railway line in 1976 (1355 Solar Hijri), the Iranian government aimed to reduce travel time from eight hours to four hours. Therefore, it began studying a second route conforming to Shinkansen standards between the two cities. This study was conducted by a Japanese consulting team from Japanese National Railways (JNR) 日本国有鉄道. Although the TurboTrains had raised previous speeds from 80 km/h to 160 km/h standards, there were still many curves where speed had to be limited to 90 km/h. Therefore, the initial Japanese proposals included providing several cut-off routes with a second track, which would effectively reduce the railway distance between the two cities by about 130 km. This measure involved eliminating the railway bottleneck between Mashhad and Neyshabur (due to the Binalud mountain range). To prevent environmental damage to the animal and plant life on both sides of this mountain range and the surrounding villages (by human activities), it was decided that this route would be an exclusive railway tunnel through the heart of the Binalud mountains. This tunnel would start from the foothills of Koohsangi (at the current location of Ayeneh Complex) and exit the mountain at Bozhan, Neyshabur, and from there, continue parallel to the old line towards Tehran. The connection between Koohsangi railway station and the current railway station would be made via a tunnel passing under Daneshgah Street (the current Line 2 of the urban railway). This route was for passenger trains and was electrified, and according to the plan, the project would start in the summer of 1979 and be operational by the end of 1981 (2540 Imperial Calendar).

== Completion of Greater Khorasan and Transnational Railway Network ==
For rail connections between Mashhad and the southern cities of Greater Khorasan, given the cargo and transit function of this route and its mountainous terrain, it was necessary to use diesel locomotives to have the power to transport heavy goods. Therefore, these routes were designed as non-electrified. This railway route was a corridor from Koohsangi to Pivehjan and from there, consistent with the current existing railway, it went to Torbat station and then from Gonabad, it split into two branches, one continuing to Kerman and Bandar Abbas and the other to Birjand and Nehbandan. Transnational railways (with the former Soviet Union and Afghanistan) also required powerful diesel locomotives due to the heavy cargo and transit nature of the route and were designed as non-electrified. Iran intended to extend a railway branch from Mashhad to the Afghan border and then assist Afghanistan in designing and building a railway line to establish a direct connection with Kabul. This was a prelude to establishing railway connections between Iran, Kabul, Rawalpindi, and Delhi.

== See also ==
- List of National Heritage Sites in Mashhad County
- Khorasan Railway
- Heydar Ghiai
- History of Railways in Iran
- Tomb of Nader Shah
- Tehran Railway Station
