= Interregio-Express =

Train service in Germany

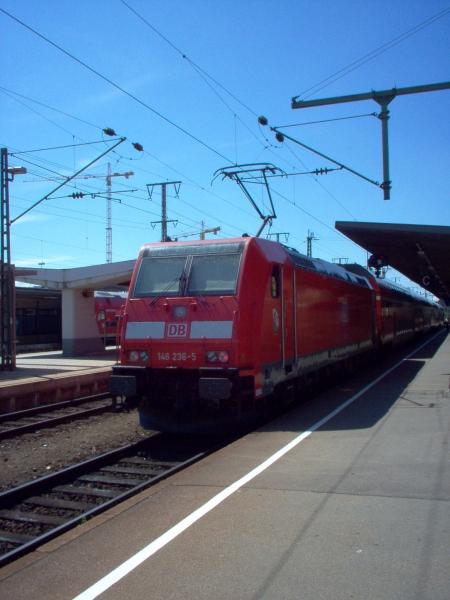
An Interregio-Express on the Black Forest railway (Baden) at Singen station

The Interregio-Express (IRE) is a train category for local public transport railway services operated by the Deutsche Bahn (DB). Until the December 2024 timetable change, it was available in the German states of Baden-Württemberg, Bavaria, Saxony, Saxony-Anhalt and Berlin, as well as on the High Rhine Railway line, which passes through Switzerland). The IRE category is since only used for the Kulturzug, a train that operates between Berlin and Wrocław, with other IRE services now operating as Regional-Express (RE) services.

== History ==
The IRE service was first introduced in the 2001 summer timetable, due to the increasing abolition of Interregio routes by DB's long-distance division (DB Fernverkehr). As a result, several German states ordered InterRegioExpress trains on the routes affected. In addition IRE trains were also introduced on routes that had not previously had an Interregio service (e. g. on the Stuttgart–Tübingen–Aulendorf and Ulm–Aalen routes).

Unlike the former Interregio trains, IRE trains were classified as local passenger trains and can therefore be used by passengers with local tickets (DB Fares product group C as well as tickets issued by Passenger Transport Executives). This led however to some passengers being confused, especially to begin with, because they frequently did not realise that they could use these trains with local tickets. Furthermore, the new train type was often wrongly referred to in the early days as an InterRegionalExpress or ironically as an InterRegioErsatz (InterRegio substitute). However, since then, the name Interregio-Express has established itself.

== Routes ==
As of 2025, the IRE category is used for the following route:

- IRE Kulturzug: Berlin-Lichtenberg — Berlin Ostkreuz — Cottbus — Wrocław Główny

=== Former routes (until 2024) ===
Baden-Württemberg and Bavaria (also cross-border trains to Switzerland):

- IRE (Stuttgart–Plochingen–Göppingen–)Ulm–Biberach–Aulendorf–Friedrichshafen–Lindau (Ulm–Friedrichshafen railway and Fils Valley Railway)
- IRE Stuttgart–Reutlingen–Tübingen-Balingen–Sigmaringen–Bad Saulgau–Aulendorf(–Ulm) (Plochingen–Tübingen railway, Tübingen–Sigmaringen railway and Ulm–Friedrichshafen railway)
- IRE Karlsruhe–Pforzheim-Stuttgart (Karlsruhe–Mühlacker railway, Western Railway, Mannheim–Stuttgart HSL)
- IRE Karlsruhe–Offenburg–Villingen–Singen–Konstanz-Kreuzlingen (Rhine Valley Railway, Black Forest Railway (Baden))
- IRE 3 Ulm–Biberach–Ravensburg–Friedrichshafen–Singen–Schaffhausen–Waldshut–Tiengen–Basel (Ulm–Friedrichshafen railway, High Rhine Railway)
- IRE Ulm - Ehingen (Donau) - Sigmaringen - Tuttlingen - Donaueschingen - Neustadt (Schwarzwald) (Danube Valley Railway: see Tuttlingen–Inzigkofen railway and Ulm–Sigmaringen railway)
- IRE Ulm–Heidenheim–Aalen (Aalen–Ulm railway)
- IRE Stuttgart–Schorndorf–Schwäbisch Gmünd–Aalen (Stuttgart-Bad Cannstatt–Aalen railway, only one pair of trains at peak traffic hours)
- IRE Stuttgart–Osterburken (only one pair of trains at peak traffic hours)
- IRE Stuttgart–Crailsheim (only one pair of trains at peak traffic hours)

Saxony and Bavaria:

- IRE Franconia-Saxony Express (Franken-Sachsen-Express) Nuremberg–Marktredwitz/Bayreuth–Hof–Plauen–Reichenbach–Zwickau–Glauchau–Chemnitz–Flöha–Freiberg–Dresden (Saxony-Franconia trunk line)

At the timetable change in December 2006, trains of the Mittelsachsen-Vogtland-Express from Hof to Dresden became a Regional-Express service. The designation IRE has since been used for the Franconia-Saxony Express from Nuremberg to Dresden, which replaced the previous Intercitys. In contrast to all the other IRE routes, the Franconia-Saxony Express is not subsidised by the SPNV (local public transport) organisations, but by an internal arm of DB Fernverkehr.

- IRE Wertheim–Miltenberg–Aschaffenburg–Hanau (Main Valley Railway)

Saxony-Anhalt and Berlin:

- IRE 25 Magdeburg-Berlin-Express: Magdeburg – Berlin Südkreuz – Berlin Potsdamer Platz – Berlin Hauptbahnhof (– Berlin Gesundbrunnen station) (two train-pairs Monday-Friday)

=== Temporary routes ===
In the meantime IRE trains with former IR coaches ran on the Saarbrücken–Kaiserslautern–Ludwigshafen–Mannheim route for a year, a route now worked by the more usual Regional-Express services. In Hesse in 2001 differences arose between the DB AG, which designated inter alia the Frankfurt–Gießen–Kassel and Frankfurt–Gießen–Siegen as InterRegioExpress routes, and the RMV, which steadfastly refused to adopt this new train category and even today uses the defunct StadtExpress term. In addition, in several federal states, on the introduction of the InterRegioExpress, former RE routes were changed to IRE routes. Whilst the difference between IRE and RE is hardly discernible, RE and RB trains can clearly be told apart just by the frequency of stops. The renaming of RE to IRE has been reversed in all cases.

== Usual running and rolling stock ==
IRE services in Baden-Württemberg use a great variety of stock, including diesel-driven tilting trains of classes 611 and 612, double-decker coaches of various generations and locomotive-hauled trains with n coaches. In earlier years y coaches could also be seen (on the Stuttgart–Tübingen line) as IRE trains as well as DBAG Class 650 multiples (Regio-Shuttle, in this case without 1st class service). Moreover, until spring 2006 old Class 112-hauled Interregio coaches in classic blue livery were also used on the Karlsruhe–Pforzheim-Stuttgart line as IRE trains. The delivery of newer double-decker coaches and Class 146 locomotives however means that that type of train formation belongs to history.

Class 612 diesel-powered tilting trains are used on the Franconia-Saxony Express.

== See also ==
- Rail transport in Germany
- Rail transport in Poland
- Train categories in Europe
