= Islamic Republic of Iran Railways =

State-owned rail company

Islamic Republic of Iran Railways (RAI)
- Iran railway 2020

Overview
- Locale: Iran

Technical
- Length: 12,998 kilometres (8,077 mi)

Other
- Website: www.rai.ir

Islamic Republic of Iran Railways (RAI)
- Industry: Rail transport
- Headquarters: Tehran, Iran

The Islamic Republic of Iran Railways (abbreviated as IRIR, or sometimes as RAI, or as IRI Railway) (Persian: راه‌آهن جمهوری اسلامی ایران, romanized: Râh âhan-e Jomhuri-ye Eslâmi-ye Irân) is the national state-owned railway system of Iran. The Raja Passenger Train Company is an associate of the IR, and manages its passenger trains. The Railway Transportation Company is an associate of the IR, which manages its freight transport. The Ministry of Roads & Urban Development is the state agency that oversees the IRIR. Some 33 million tonnes of goods and 29 million passengers are transported annually by the rail transportation network, accounting for 9 percent and 11 percent of all transportation in Iran, respectively (2011).

== Operations ==
In 2008, the IR operated 11,106 km of rail with a further 18,900 km in various stages of development. Almost all of this is standard gauge of 1,435 mm (4 ft 8 1/2 in), but 94 km are Russian gauge of 1,520 mm (4 ft 11 27/32 in) to link up to ex-Soviet Union border states. There is also the no-longer-isolated Indian gauge section of 1,676 mm (5 ft 6 in) from Zahedan to the Pakistan border that continues to Quetta and the Indian sub-continent. The extent of double-track lines is 1,082 km. The Jolfa–Tabriz line is electrified (148 km). In 2006, IR reported that it possessed 565 engines, 1,192 passenger coaches, and 16,330 wagons. The vast majority of the engines are diesel-powered.

== Affiliate companies ==
- Raja Passenger Train Company is an associate of the Islamic Republic of Iran Railways (IRIR) and manages its passenger trains, including international trains linking Tehran to Istanbul and Damascus. Raja Passenger Train Company carried more than 4 million passengers during 2003–05. The number of passengers traveling by rail increased from 11.7 million in 2000 to 17.3 million in the year ending March 2005. Every passenger wagon annually carries 7,340 passengers per km on average (whereas the figure is 3,950 people per km in Turkey and 5,220 passengers per km in Egypt). Private enterprises are expected to operate 5,000 wagons by 2009 (50% of total).
- Railway Transportation Company is also a subsidiary of the IRIR which manages its freight transport while the Ministry of Roads and Transportation is the state agency that oversees the IRIR. In Iran, for every wagon, some 1,050 tons of freight are being transported (2008).
- Zarand Company provides the national railroad system with freight and passenger train carriages.

== See also ==
- Iranian railway industry
- Railway stations in Iran
- Trans-Iranian Railway
- DESA diesel
- Tehran Metro
- North–South Transport Corridor
