= Rail transport in Iran =

- Iran railway 2020

Operation
- National railway: Islamic Republic of Iran Railways (RAI)
- Major operators: RAI, Tooka rail, Samand rail

Statistics
- Ridership: 21 million
- Passenger-distance: 13 billion
- Freight: 31 million tonnes

System length
- Total: 12,998 kilometres (8,077 mi)
- Double track: 1426 km
- Electrified: 146 km

Track gauge
- Main: 1,435 mm (4 ft 8 1/2 in)

Electrification
- Main: 25 kV 50 Hz AC

Features
- No. of tunnels: 105
- Tunnel length: 120 km
- Longest tunnel: 3000 m
- No. of bridges: 350
- Longest bridge: 750 m
- No. of stations: 360
- Max elevation: 2500 m
- Min elevation: -20 m

Iran has a state-owned railway system built to standard gauge (1,435 mm (4 ft 8½ in)) which falls under the remit of the Ministry of Roads & Urban Development. The primary rail carrier is the Islamic Republic of Iran Railways (abbreviated as IRIR, or sometimes as RAI, or as IRI Railway) which is the national state-owned railway system of Iran.

In 2008, the IR operated 11,106 km of rail with a further 18,900 km in various stages of development. Almost all of this is standard gauge of 1,435 mm (4 ft 8 1/2 in), but 94 km are Russian gauge of 1,520 mm (4 ft 11 27/32 in) to link up to ex-Soviet Union border states. There is also the no-longer-isolated Indian gauge section of 1,676 mm (5 ft 6 in) from Zahedan to the Pakistan border that continues to Quetta and the Indian sub-continent. The extent of double-track lines is 1,082 km. The Jolfa–Tabriz line is electrified (148km). In 2006, IR reported that it possessed 565 engines, 1,192 passenger coaches, and 16,330 wagons. The vast majority of the engines are diesel-powered.

== History ==
=== Qajar era ===
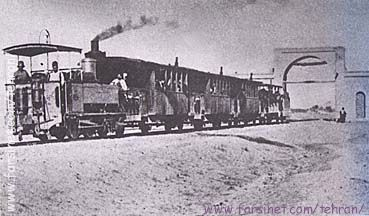
Narrow-gauge railway Tehran – Rey

In 1886, during the reign of Naser al-Din Shah Qajar, an 8.7 km 1,000 mm (3 ft 3 3/8 in) metre gauge horse-driven suburban railway was established south of Tehran, which was later converted to steam. This line was closed in 1952. The First Iranian railway was set up in 1887 between Mahmudabad and Amol; its construction was completely private. However it was not used because of several problems. The Tabriz–Jolfa line (146 km) was built in 1914, the Sufiyan–Sharafkhaneh line (53 km) in 1916, and the Mirjaveh–Zahedan line (93 km) in 1920.

=== Interwar period ===
The 1,392 km (865 mi) long Trans-Iranian Railway from Bandar Shah on the Caspian Sea to Bandar Shahpur on the Persian Gulf was opened during the reign of Reza Shah Pahlavi in 1938. The railroad was built with rail weighing 33 kilograms per metre (67 lb/yd) and required more than 3000 bridges. There were 126 tunnels in the Zagros mountains, the longest of which was 2.4 kilometres (1.5 mi). Grades averaged 1.5 percent south of Tehran, but then increased to 2.8 percent to cross the 2,220-metre (7,270 ft) pass between Tehran and the Caspian Sea.

=== Anglo-Soviet Invasion of Iran ===
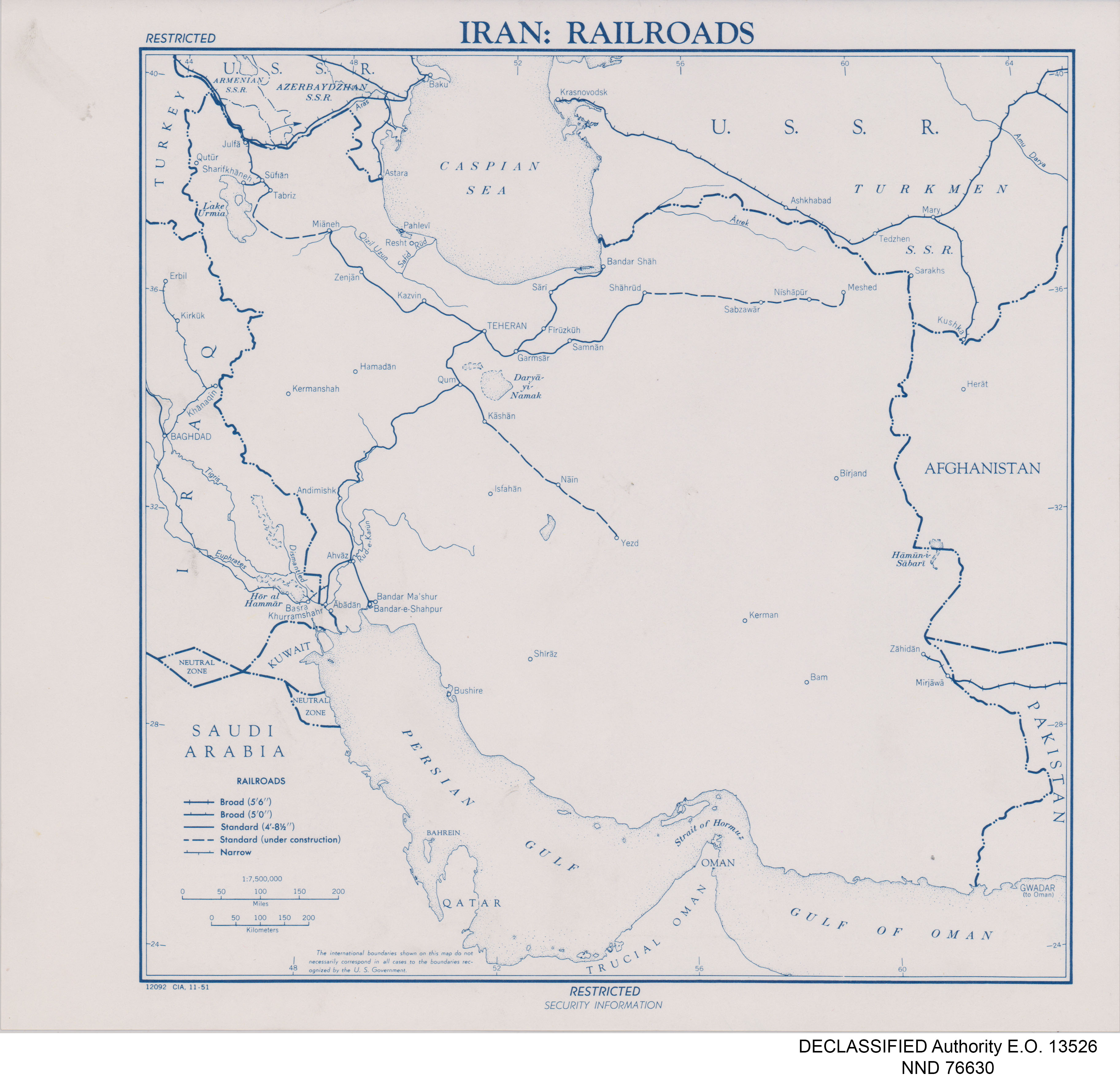
Map of rail lines in 1951

After the Anglo-Soviet invasion of Iran in 1941, this Persian Corridor became one of the supply routes for war material for the Soviet Union during World War II (Railway trend in Iran). The invading British built a 121-kilometre (75 mi) branch line from the 2,953-foot (900 m) bridge over the Karun River in Ahvaz to a new southern port at Khorramshahr on the Arvand Rud river. In 1943, 3,473 American soldiers of the Military Railway Service began running trains between the Persian Gulf and Caspian Sea using ALCO RS-1 locomotives rebuilt with 3-axle trucks and designated RSD-1. The Americans set up headquarters in Ahvaz, but were unable to tolerate the daytime heat, and generally operated the railway at night. The Persian Gulf Command ran trains day and night.

=== Challenging construction ===
The Trans-Iranian railway traverses many mountain ranges, and is full of spirals and 1 in 36 (2.78%) ruling grades. Much of the terrain was unmapped when construction took place, and its geology unknown. Several stretches of line, including tunnels, were built through unsuitable geology, and had to be replaced before the line opened. For example

- one tunnel went through a salt dome so that ground water was bound to dissolve the foundations; this tunnel and its approaches had to be completely replaced.

The railways have undergone extensions including the 1977 linking to the western railway system at the Turkish border, the 1993 opening of the Bandar Abbas line providing better access to the sea, and the 1996 opening of the Mashad–Sarakhs extension as part of the Silk Road railway to link to the landlocked Central Asian Countries.

=== Railway construction ===
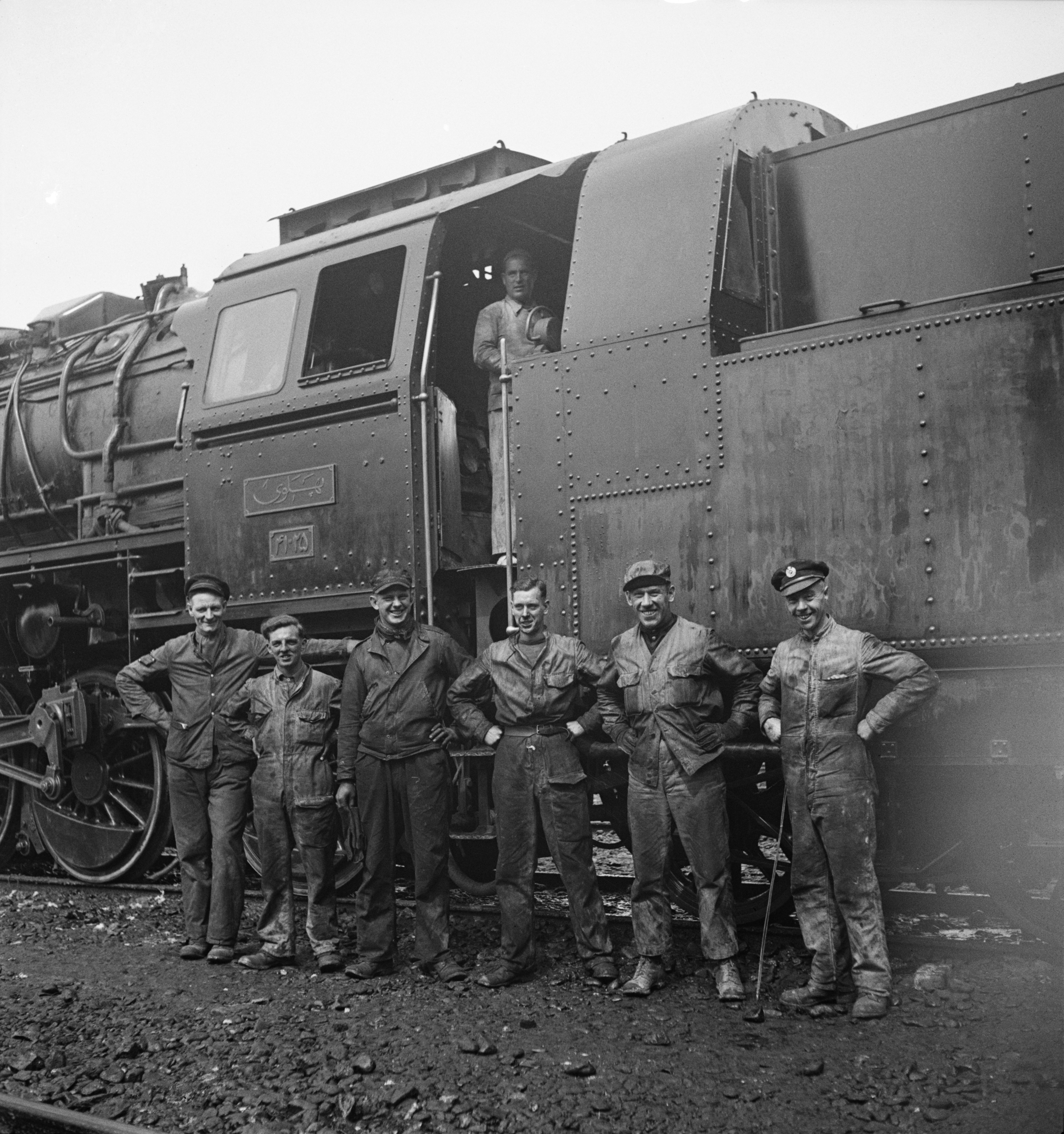
Following the Anglo-Soviet invasion of Iran, American and British railroad crews pose alongside a locomotive, ca. 1943.

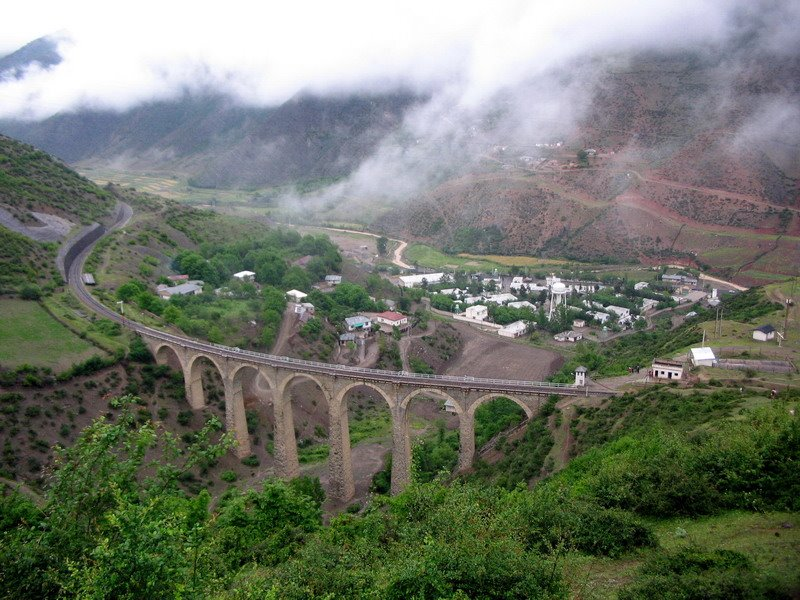
A railway bridge at Do Ab, Mazandaran province on the Gorgan — Bandar Torkaman line, 2007.

In December 2014, a rail line from Iran opened to Turkmenistan and Kazakhstan. The opening of the line marks the first direct rail link between Iran, Kazakhstan and China, and upon completion of the Marmaray rail project direct rail transport between China and Europe (while avoiding Russia) will be possible.

Start	End	Length in km	Start	End
of Route		Length in km	of Construction	
Tabriz	Jolfa	148	1912	1916
Zahedan	Mirjaveh	94	1920	1921
Tehran	Bandar Torkaman	461	1928	1938
Tehran	Bandar Šâhpur	928	1928	1939
Ahvaz	Khorramshahr	121	1942	1943
Sar Bandar	Mahshahr	12	1950	1951
Garmsar	Mashhad	812	1938	1958
Tehran	Tabriz	736	1939	1959
Gorgan	Bandar Torkaman	35	1960	1961
Sufian	Razi	139	1912	1971
Qom	Zarand	847	1939	1971
Isfahan	Zarrin Shahr	111	1969	1972
Zarand	Kerman	80	1975	1979
Bafq	Bandar-Abbas	626	1982	1995
Mashhad	Sarakhs	165	1993	1997
Aprin	Maleki	24	1993	1997
Badrud	Meibod	254	1996	1998
Chadormalu	Meibod	219	1992	1999
Mohammediya-2	Mohammediya-1	6	1994	1999
Aprin	Mohammediya-2	122	1994	1999
Rostamkola	Amir Abad Port	25	1996	2001
Kerman	Bam	225	1999	2002
Bafq	Torbat-e Heydarieh	800	1992	2004
Bam	Zahedan	546	2000	2009
Isfahan	Shiraz	506	2001	2009
Torbat-e Heydarieh	Khaf (Sangan Iron Mine)	146	2004	2010
Khorramshahr	Shalamcheh (Iraqi border)	16	2009	2012
Gorgan	Etrek	88	2009	2014
Tehran	Hamedan	268	2001	2017
Khaf	Shamtiq (Afghan border)	78	2007	2017
Arak	Kermanshah	267	2001	2018
Maragheh	Urmia	183	2003	2018
Qazvin	Rasht	164	2006	2018
Yazd	Eqlid	271	2015	2021
Zahedan	Khash	155	2013	2022
Hamedan	Sanandaj	151	2006	2023
Rasht	Caspian	37	2006	2024
Mianeh	Ardabil	174	2005	2026

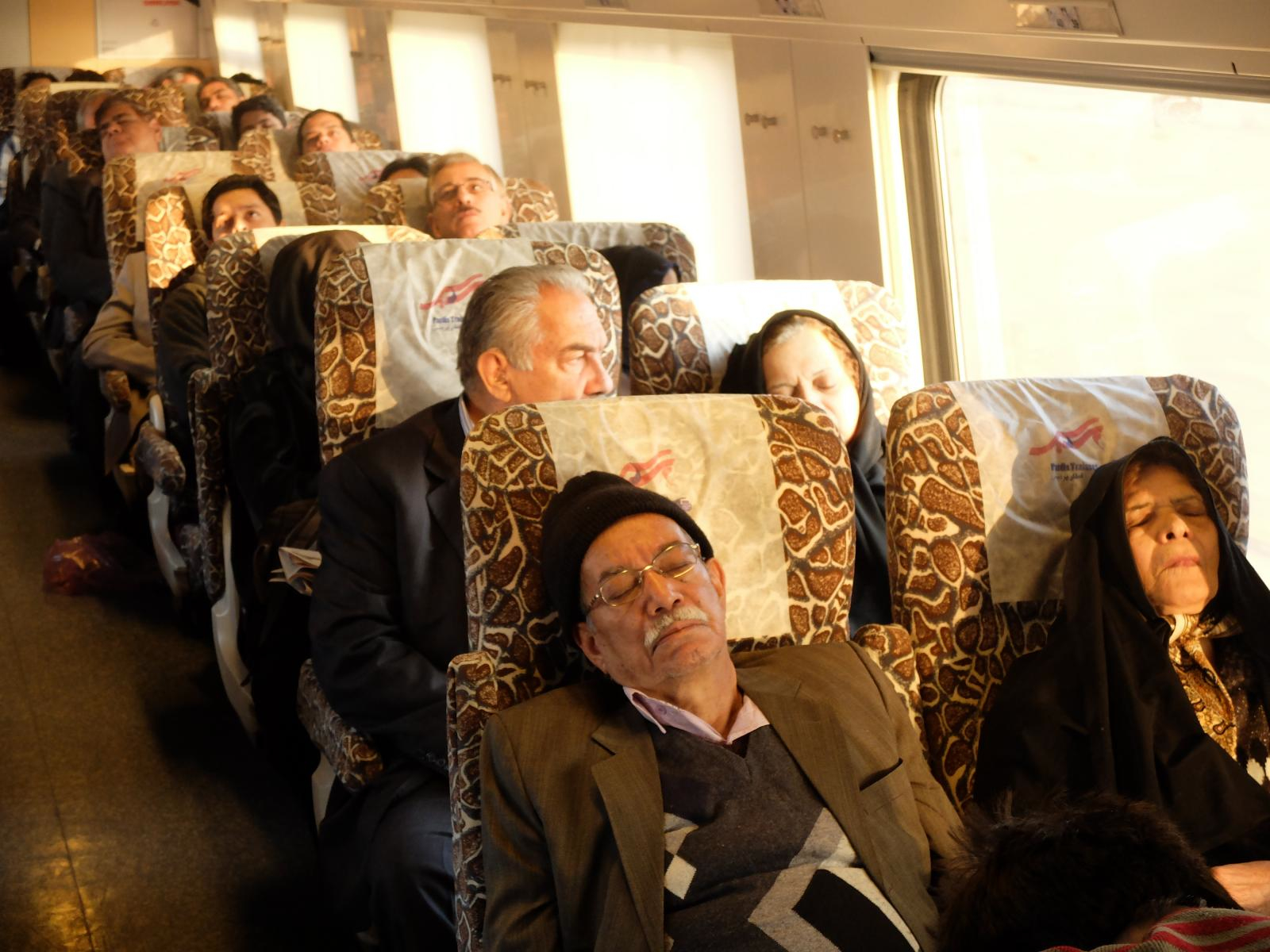
Passengers on board a train from Yazd to Tehran, 2014

== Rolling stock ==
Iran Railways uses a variety of rolling stock for their services. Trains are operated with diesel and electric locomotives. Steam locomotives have been phased out. Diesel is a strategic industry, and by using this heavy oil as a fuel instead of gas for locomotives, the Islamic Republic of Iran has joined the 12 world countries which manufacture this type of engine.

== Operations ==
The Islamic Republic of Iran Railways is the national state-owned railway system of Iran. The Raja Passenger Train Company is an associate of the IR, and manages its passenger trains. The Railway Transportation Company is an associate of the IR, which manages its freight transport. The Ministry of Roads & Urban Development is the state agency that oversees the IRIR. Some 33 million tonnes of goods and 29 million passengers are transported annually by the rail transportation network, accounting for 9 percent and 11 percent of all transportation in Iran, respectively (2011). In 2008, the IR operated 11,106 km of rail with a further 18,900 km in various stages of development. Almost all of this is standard gauge of 1,435 mm (4 ft 8 1/2 in), but 9 km are Russian gauge of 1,520 mm (4 ft 11 27/32 in) to link up to ex-Soviet Union border states. There is also the no-longer-isolated Indian gauge section of 1,676 mm (5 ft 6 in) from Zahedan to the Pakistan border that continues to Quetta and the Indian sub-continent. The extent of double-track lines is 1,082 km. The Jolfa–Tabriz line is electrified (148 km). In 2006, IR reported that it possessed 565 engines, 1,192 passenger coaches, and 16,330 wagons. The vast majority of the engines are diesel-powered.

=== Expansion ===
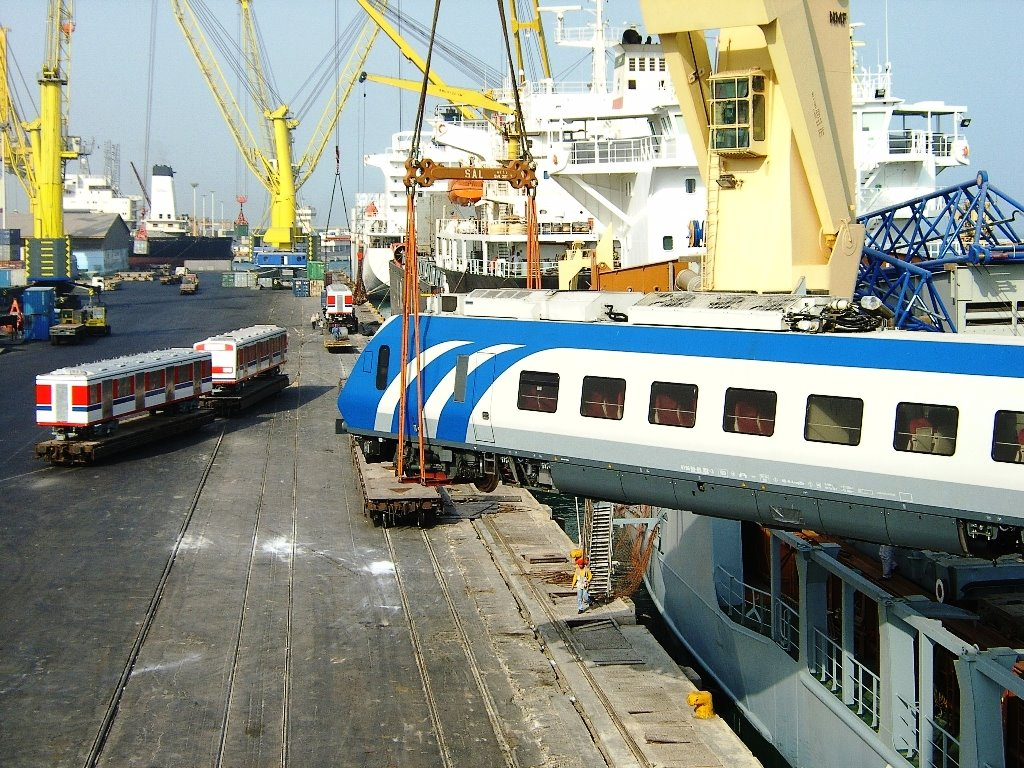
Pardis trains being unloaded in Shahid Rajai Port.

The majority of transportation in Iran is road-based. The government plans to transport 3.5% of the passenger volume and 8.5% of the freight volume by rail. Extensive electrification is planned. The railway network expands by about 500 km per year according to the Ministry of R&T. According to plan, Iran's railway lines are to reach 15,000 km by 2015 and 25,000 km by the year 2025. The State Railways Company has 300 locomotives with an average lifespan of 40 years. The Islamic Republic of Iran Railways, the Iran Power Plant Projects Management (Mapna) and Germany's Siemens have signed a contract for 150 IranRunner locomotives for passenger trains. Siemens is committed to exporting to Iran some 30 locomotives in the first phase, and to manufacturing another 120 using domestic capacities and expertise over the next 6 years (2007). MLC (Mapna Locomotive Engineering and Manufacturing Company) is the manufacturing company responsible for this production. Another locomotive manufacturer in Iran is Wagon Pars which builds AD43C locomotives in partnership with Iranian power plant maker DESA diesel. In 2009, €17 billion in foreign investment in the rail industry has been secured, according to the Ministry of Road and Transportation of Iran.

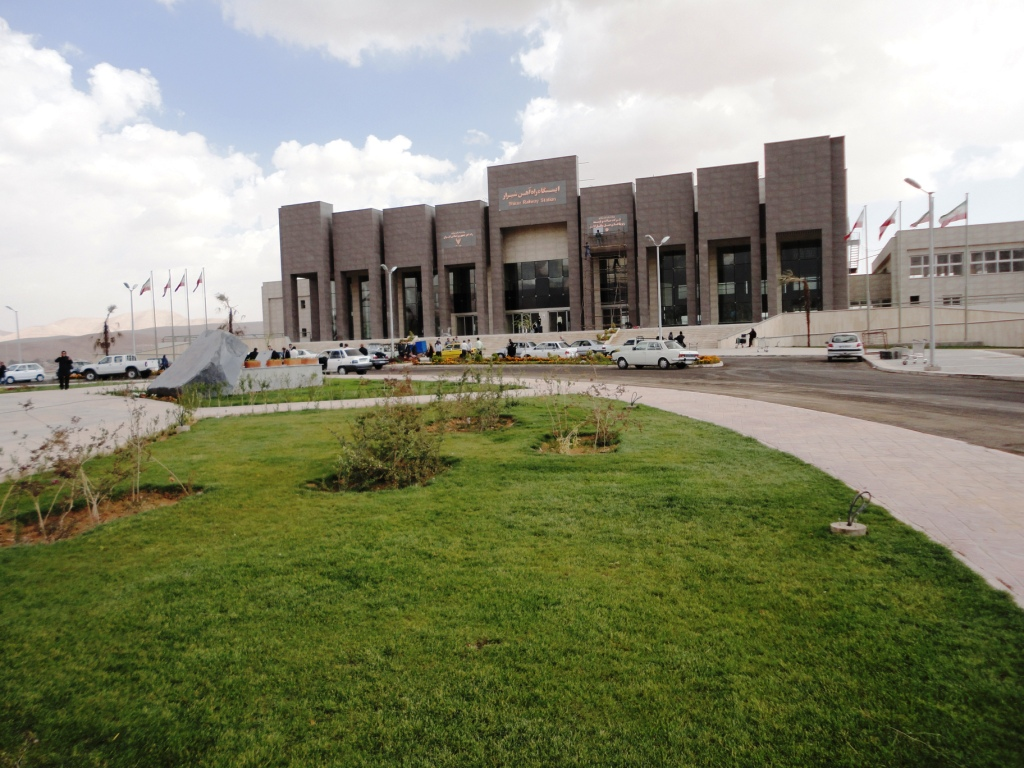
Shiraz train station

== Network and corridors ==
The railway network converges on Tehran. The Iranian cities of Isfahan and Shiraz were linked to Tehran in 2009. Further extension of this line to Bushehr and Bandar Abbas is planned. Furthermore, the construction of Chabahar-Zahedan-Mashhad railway, extending from southeast to northeast of the country to the length of 1,350 kilometers, started in 2010 with 3 billion euro credit. The western railway extension links to Turkey at the Rāzī–Kapıköy border. There is a northern connection to Azerbaijan, the Caucasus, and Russia has a bogie-changing station at the border at Jolfa. The southern routes connect Tehran to the Persian Gulf ports of Bandar Imam and Bandar Abbas. A line to the Caspian Sea ends at the terminal of Amir Abad and at Bandar Torkaman, and is part of a north–south corridor to Russia and Scandinavia. The north-east corridor connects Mashhad and continues further to the bogie-changing station at Sarakhs. For the landlocked countries of Turkmenistan, Uzbekistan, Tajikistan, Kyrgyzstan, and Kazakhstan this line provides access to the sea. A recent connection from Mashhad to Bafq has significantly shortened access to the port city of Bandar Abbas. Tehran-Mashhad with a length of 900 km, Tehran-Qom-Esfahan with a length of 410 km (under construction), Qazvin-Rasht-Anzali-Astara with a length of 370 km; will all be built with help from China at a cost of $12 billion. In total, Iran has signed a number of contracts with China for the development of 5,000 km of railway lines.

=== North-South Railway ===
The north–south railway is complete between Bandar-e Anzali and Bandar Abbas; the line was initially expected to be completed as far as Azerbaijan by the end of 2016. Qazvin to Astara was the missing link in the North-South Transportation Corridor, which links India, Iran, Azerbaijan, Russia and Finland. Qazvin-Rasht railway was completed in 2018 and Rasht-Anzali in 2023 whilst Anzali-Astara railway needs another four years to be completed.

=== Links to Azerbaijan and Armenia ===
Iran's first rail link to the outside world appeared simultaneously with the beginning of the country's railway system, as Iran's first major railway (1916) connected Tabriz with Jolfa on the border with the Russian Empire. The link continued its importance throughout the USSR era; Iran and the USSR signed an agreement on cross-border rail transport in 1940, and amended it in 1958. It is reported that during the late-Soviet era, some 350 railcars crossed the border at Jolfa daily, with the annual amount of cross-border freight reaching 3.5 million tons. However, after the breakup of the USSR and the closing of the border between Armenia and Azerbaijan the Jolfa connection became a dead end, as it only links Iran with the isolated Nakhichevan exclave of the Republic of Azerbaijan. In 2007, Iranian Railways, Azerbaijan State Railway and Russian Railways agreed on implementing the project to build a new line between Qazvin, Resht, Astara, Iran and Astara, Azerbaijan. In April 2017, Russia and India celebrated 70 years of diplomatic relations and vowed to complete the North-South Transportation Corridor (NSTC) with the help of Iran. The NSTC reduces time and cost of travel by 30-40%.There is presently no direct railway connection between Iran and Armenia, even though the two countries share a border. In 2009, Iran and Armenia agreed to build a railway linking Armenia with Iran's Persian Gulf ports.

=== Links to Central Asia ===
In 1996, Mashhad–Sarakhs extension connected Iran to Turkmenistan, as part of the Silk Road railway to link to the landlocked Central Asian Countries. Former states of the Soviet Union have railways using a 1,520 mm (4 ft 11 27/32 in) Russian gauge, thus the Iranian Railways maintain break-of-gauge services at borders to Azerbaijan and Turkmenistan, and beyond brief wide-track rail segments to the border crossing. The Kazakhstan-Turkmenistan-Iran railway link is a part of the North-South Transport Corridor and is a 677 km (421 mi)long railway line connecting the Central Asian countries of Kazakhstan and Turkmenistan with Iran and the Persian Gulf. It will link Uzen in Kazakhstan with Bereket - Etrek in Turkmenistan and end at Gorgan in Iran's Golestan province. In Iran, the railway will be linked to national network making its way to the ports of the Persian Gulf. The project is estimated to cost $620m which is being jointly funded by the governments of Kazakhstan, Turkmenistan and Iran.

=== Links to Iraq, Syria and Afghanistan ===
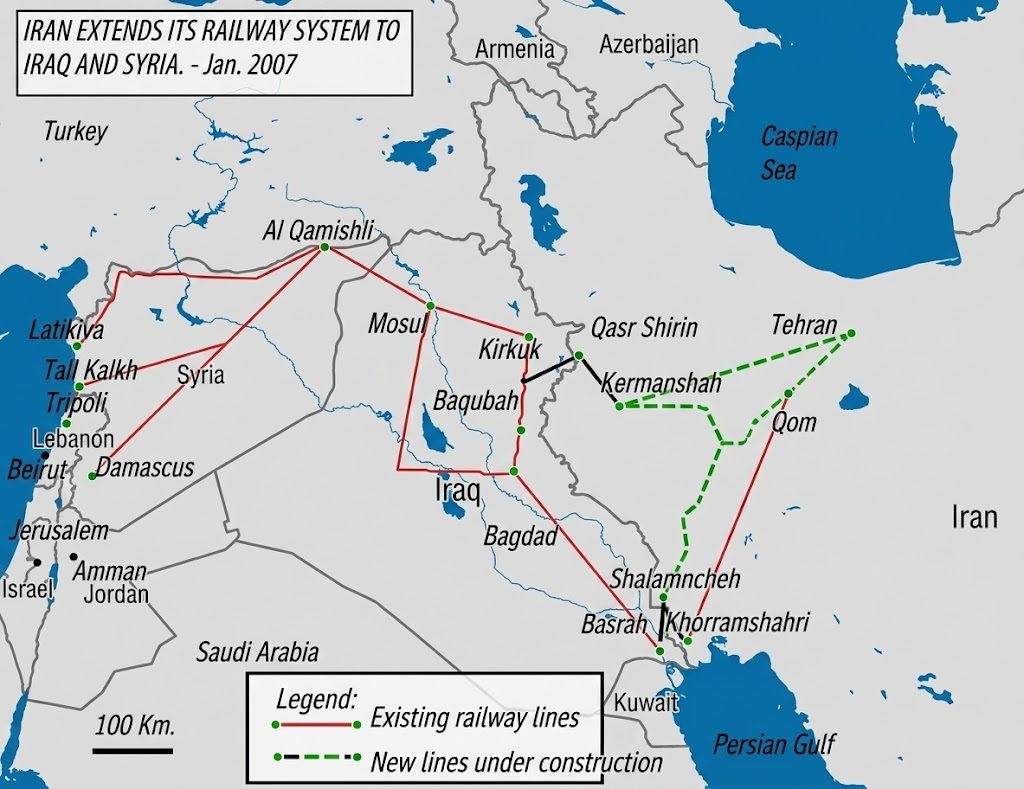
Iran extends its railway system to Iraq and Syria(01-2007)

Feasibility studies were started on Khorramshahr-Basra and Kermanshah-Baghdad links with Iraq. As of 2014, the Iranian line to Khorramshahr was finished, but construction had not started on the track from the Iraqi border to Basra. In 2017, the West Corridor known locally as Rahahane Gharb was expanded from Arak to Malayer and Kermanshah. The Iranian government plans on expanding the network further to Khosravi (Iran-Iraq) border. China Civil Engineering Construction Corp is building the Malayer-Khosravi corridor, which will eventually run to the border with Iraq. On 27 December 2021, Iran and Iraq agreed to build a railway connecting both countries. The project would connect Basra in southern Iraq to Shalamcheh in western Iran. There are only around 30 kilometers (18 miles) between the two areas. The railway would be strategically important for Iran, linking the country to the Mediterranean Sea via Iraq and Syria's railways.

Mashhad-Khvaf-Afghanistan's Border-Islam Qala railway is being constructed by an Iranian firm, with funding from the Afghan government, but the section in Afghanistan remains incomplete. On 10 December 2020, the first rail link between Iran and Afghanistan on Khaf - Herat route between Khaf and Rahzanak in Afghanistan for a distance of 140 km (87 mi) was formally inaugurated although traffic had started on 12 December 2020 with a 500 tonnes test train cement delivery from Iran. The works on remaining 85 km (53 mi) section of the project between Rahzanak and Herat is in progress. The works on both sides are done as development assistance to Afghanistan by Iran. The new Khaf - Rahzanak rail line continues from Khaf to Torbat-e Heydarieh where it links with Mashhad - Bafq railway line a crucial rail link opened in 2009 which connects port city, Bandar Abbas in Persian Gulf with north eastern city of Mashhad and from there with Turkmenistan through Sarakhs.

=== Link to Turkey, and International Standard Gauge route to Europe ===
In 1977, the Iranian railways linked to the western railway system at the Turkish border. The route to the west into Turkey terminates at Van with a 90 km (56 mi) train ferry for both freight wagons and international passenger traffic (baggage car only) across Lake Van, which is at an altitude of 1,650 m (5,413 ft), to Tatvan where it joins the Turkish standard-gauge network.

=== Link to Pakistan ===
The construction of the railway from Bam to Zahedan was completed in early 2009 connecting Tehran to Pakistan border with an opening ceremony on 19 July 2009. However international container traffic commenced operations on 14 August 2009 with transshipment (or transloading) between 1,676 mm (5 ft 6 in) and 1,435 mm (4 ft 8 1/2 in) standard gauge wagons in the Zahedan Exchange Yard on the bypass line. The freight traffic was discontinued however after the initial trial trains, and was only revived in 2015. Iranian Railways have been trying to persuade Pakistan Railways to convert its route to Quetta to standard gauge, in order to facilitate the flow of international traffic to Europe. Pakistan responded in 2006 with a statement that it is to convert its network to standard gauge, and would plan a link with the standard gauge system of China. A through passenger service is being considered to supplement the occasional Quetta-Zahedan service, itself a poor shadow of the former Pakistan-Iran 'Taftan Express'.

=== International railway links with neighboring countries ===
- Afghanistan-open-1,435 mm (4 ft 8 1/2 in) standard gauge.
- Armenia-no link-break-of-gauge 1,520 mm (4 ft 11 27/32 in).
- Azerbaijan-open-break-of-gauge 1,520 mm (4 ft 11 27/32 in)-only via the Azerbaijani exclave Nakhchivan; a railway link to Azerbaijan proper is being built.
- Iraq-no link-1,435 mm (4 ft 8 1/2 in) standard gauge.
- Pakistan-open-break-of-gauge 1,676 mm (5 ft 6 in).
- Turkey-open-1,435 mm (4 ft 8 1/2 in) standard gauge.
- Turkmenistan-open-break-of-gauge.1,520 mm (4 ft 11 27/32 in).

== Railway electrification ==
Although railway electrification in Iran began in 1975, it was halted for almost 30 years. A contract for electrification of the Tehran-Mashhad double-track line and the supply of 70 electric locomotives was awarded in 2009. Speeds of up to 200 km/h for locomotive-hauled passenger trains and 250 km/h for tilting EMUs are expected to reduce existing journey times of 7.5 to 12 to less than 5 hours.

== Commuter railway services ==
Local Rail, also referred to as Suburban Rail or Commuter rail when originating from a large city and covering its suburbs, is a class of rail services, using railbus-type trains, running a distance of about 50 km to 200 km, and serving all stations. Currently there are the following services:

- Tehran
  1. Tehran-Parand
  2. Tehran-Jamkaran
  3. Tehran-Qom
  4. Tehran-Pishva
  5. Tehran-Firuzkuh
- Tabriz
  1. Tabriz-Azarbaijan Shahid Madani University
  2. Tabriz-Jolfa
  3. Tabriz-Maragheh
  4. Tabriz-Salmas (Once every two weeks)
- Khuzestan
  1. Ahvaz (Karun Station)-Sarbandar
  2. Ahvaz (Karun Station)-Bandar-e Mahshahr
  3. Ahvaz (Ahvaz Station)-Khorramshahr
  4. Ahvaz (Ahvaz Station)-Andimeshk
  5. Andimeshk-Dorud
- Lorestan
  1. Dorud-Cham Sangar
- Mashhad
  1. Mashhad-Binalud-Neishabur
  2. Mashhad-Sarakhs
- Mazandaran-Golestan (Shomal Division)
  1. Gorgan-Pol-e Sefid
  2. Gorgan-Incheh Borun
- Qazvin
  1. Hashtgerd-Qazvin (Planned)

== High-speed rail ==
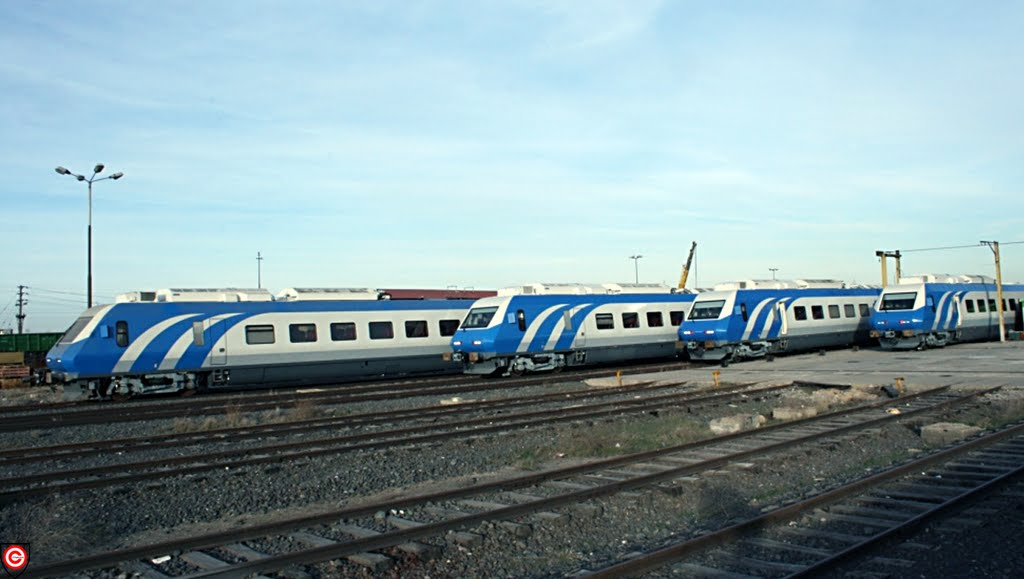
Siemens DMUs capable of traveling at 200 km/h manufactured in Iran, 2007

Currently there is one high speed railway line under construction between Tehran and Isfahan passing through Qom. The length of the line is 410 km; completion is planned for 2025.

Construction of another high speed rail line between Qom and Arak is under way as well.

== See also ==
- Iranian railway industry
- Railway stations in Iran
- Trans-Iranian Railway
- Islamic Republic of Iran Railways
- DESA diesel
- Tehran Metro
- North–South Transport Corridor
- Ashgabat Agreement, a Multimodal transport agreement signed by India, Oman, Iran, Turkmenistan, Uzbekistan and Kazakhstan, for creating an international transport and transit corridor facilitating transportation of goods between Central Asia and the Persian Gulf.
