= List of stock used by railways in Iran =

While passenger trains are operated by private operators, motive power is generally provided by the Islamic Republic of Iran Railways (RAI). Additionally, Alborz Niroo Equipment & Railway Fleet Company runs freight train using privately owned diesel locomotives.

== Current ==
=== Electric locomotives ===
Class	Numbers	Type	Manufacturer	Introduced	Weight	Power	Electric brake power	Tractive Effort	Top speed	Length	Width	Height	Comments
	651-658	RC4	ASEA	1985	80 t	3440 kW	2400 kW	218 kN	100 km/h				

=== Diesel locomotives ===
This is an incomplete list of diesel locomotives used in Iran.

Class	Numbers (Qty)	Type	Manufacturer	Introduced	Weight	Power	Dynamic brake power	Tractive Effort	Top speed	Length	Width	Height	Comments
40	001-137 (137)	G12	EMD	1957		963 kW		115 kN	105 km/h				
40	138-178	G22W	EMD	1975		1103 kW		116 kN	105 km/h				
40	401-414 (14)	G8	EMD	1959		643 kW		158 kN	105 km/h				
40	451-452 (2)	G18W	EMD	1968		735 kW		95 kN	105 km/h				
60	301-320 (20)	G16	EMD	1959		1323 kW		253 kN	105 km/h				
60	501–569, 801–914, (183)	GT26CW	EMD	1971	120 t	2205 kW	1500 kW	235 kN	123 km/h				
60	915–994 (80)	GT26CW-2	EMD	1984	132 t	2205 kW		235 kN	132 km/h				
60	351-360 (10)	LDE626 CL-2	Electroputere/ALCO	1986		1385 kW		234 kN	100 km/h				
60	? (10)	060-DA	Electroputere/Sulzer	1959		1546 kW			100 km/h				
60	? (77)	GT26CW	EMD	2009-2015	120 t	2205 kW	1500 kW	235 kN	123 km/h				Former Korail class 7100 and 7500, now used by AlborzNiroo.
60	2001-2021 (21)	U30C	General Electric	1992	120 t	2400 kW	2400 kW	240 kN	107 km/h	17.7 m	3.02 m	4.06 m	Serial numbers 47055-47075
60	2022-2055 (34)	C30-7i	General Electric	1993	132 t	2400 kW	2400 kW	340 kN	113 km/h	18 m	3.15 m	4.2 m	Serial numbers 4756.1-4756.34, built in Montreal
60	2056-2062 (7)	C30-7i	General Electric	1994	132 t	2400 kW	2400 kW	340 kN	113 km/h	18 m	3.15 m	4.2 m	Serial numbers 47773-47779
40	601-638 (37)	HD10C	Hitachi	1970	68 t	709 kW		122 kN	100 km/h				
	? (5)	2M62U	Luhansk	1997		2942 kW			100 km/h				
60	201-230 (30)	AD43C	Alstom	2002	123 t	3160 kW	3000 kW	480 kN	150 km/h				Passenger variant
60	231-299 (69)	AD43C	Alstom	2002	123 t	3160 kW	3000 kW	480 kN	110 km/h				Freight variant
		DF8	CSR	2008	138 t	3680 kW	3700 kW	369 kN	100 km/h	22.2 m	2.95 m	4.75 m	
40	1501-1650 (150)	IranRunner	Siemens	2010	t	2400 kW	-kW		160 km/h	18.6 m	2.9 m	4.3 m	Passenger

=== Diesel multiple unit ===
Class	Image	Type	Top speed		Number	Remarks	Built
Class	Image	Type	mph	km/h	Number	Remarks	Built
Turbotrain		First Class Train	99	160		Exported from SNCF	1967
DH4 IRAN (Pardis)		First Class Train	99	160	20	Built by Siemens	2005
Rotem 4 (Railbus)		Suburban Train				Exported from Hyundai Rotem	

=== Carriages ===
Class	Image	Type	Top speed		Number	Remarks	Built
Class	Image	Type	mph	km/h	Number	Remarks	Built
Green Train		First Class Train				Built by SGP	
Simorgh Train		First Class Train				Built and Delivered in Germany	
Tus Train		First Class Train				Built and Delivered in Germany	
Green Pleurisy Train		First Class Train				Built and Delivered in Romania	
Delijan Train		First Class Train				Built and Delivered in France	
Persian Gulf Train		First Class Train				Built and delivered in Germany	
Parsi Train		First Class Train				Built by Wagon Pars	2007
Raad Train		First Class Train				Built and Delivered in Spain	
First Class Spanish Train		First Class Train				Built and Delivered in Spain	
Chinese 1st class sleeping carriages(Ghazal Train)		First Class Train			150	Built and Delivered in China	2004
First Class East Germany Train		First Class Train				Built and Delivered in Germany	
Maral Train		First Class Train				Built and Delivered in France	
Safir Train		First Class Train				Built and Delivered in China	
Fadak Train		First Class Train				CIWL	
Mahtab Train		First Class Train					
Milad Train		First Class Train					
N-wagen (Otubusi)		Second Class Train				Second hand from Germany.	
SRZ125Z (Double Decker Otubusi)		Second Class Train				Exported from Chinese Railway.	
Normal Otubusi Train		Second Class Train				Second Hand from Germany	2007
Scandia Litra B, ABns(Alborz Train)		Second Class Train			166	Bought from DSB	1998
Third Class West Germany Tabdili Train		Third Class Train				Second Hand from Germany	
Zagros Train		Third Class Train					

== Former ==
=== Steam locomotives ===
Steam locomotives have been phased out by Iran Railways.

Class	Image	Manufacturer	Introduced	Top speed	Comments
Class 30.0 (de)		Krupp	1929		2 locomotives
Class 31.0 (de)		Krupp	1929		5 locomotives
Class 300 (de)		Baldwin Locomotive Works	1932		4 locomotives
Class 41.0 (de)		Beyer, Peacock & Company	1934		5 locomotives
Class 42 (de)		NOHAB	1936		12 locomotives
Class 86 (de)		Beyer, Peacock & Company	1936		4 locomotives
kkStB 80 (de)		Wiener Neustädter Lokomotivfabrik, Lokomotivfabrik Floridsdorf, Lokomotivfabrik der StEG and ČKD	1937		10 locomotives
		Krupp, Henschel, MF Esslingen			Axle 1'D. 49 locomotives.
		Henschel			Axle 1'E. 16 locomotives.
Class 52.1 (de)		Vulcan Foundry	1952		2-10-2. Freight locomotives, 64 built. Total weight 175 tons
2-8-0		Maschinenfabrik Esslingen			
