= DESA company =

Iranian engineering company

Coordinates: 36.400897°N 52.329705°E

Iran Heavy Diesel Manufacturing Company DESA
- Type: Private Company
- Industry: Manufacturing, Engineering, service
- Founded: 1991; 35 years ago
- Headquarters: Amol (factory) and Tehran (sales office) Iran
- Area served: Worldwide
- Key people: A. Ghorban Alibeik, Managing Director; M. Mirsalim, Chairman
- Products: Diesel engine, gas engine
- Services: Maintenance & refurbishing of diesel engines
- Revenue: $ 30.2 million
- Number of employees: 160(2009)
- Website: www.desa.ir

Iran Heavy Diesel Manufacturing Company (DESA) is an Iranian company which is a manufacturer of heavy diesel engines from 200 to 3500 kW for railway, marine and power generation purposes.

== History ==
The Iran Heavy Diesel Engine Mfg Co. (DESA) company was established in 1991 in Amol with the aim of developing industrial production of diesel engines; a factory of over 10,000m^{2} was constructed on a 80ha site, with facilities for quality testing and research and design.

The company obtained licenses to manufacture Wärtsilä engines and Ruston RK 215 engines under license from MAN. Wärtsilä engine assembly began in 1996, RK 215 engine production began in 2000.

In 2009 the company unveiled Iran's first indigenous heavy diesel engine, the D87.

== Production ==
Generators

The company produces diesel generators for permanent and emergency electricity supply. 104 units have been supplied to the Iran Telecommunications Company.

Railway

The company is a supplier to both the Iranian Islamic Republic Railways and the Raja Passenger Train Company.

DESA has manufactured the Ruston RK 215 diesel engine for the AD43C mainline diesel locomotive, of which 70 units were manufactured by Wagon Pars.

The company is also assembling 16V 4000 MTU type diesel engines for a contract for 150 IranRunner locomotives for passenger trains to be manufactured by Siemens and the MLC (Mapna Locomotive Engineering and Manufacturing Company). The first 30 units will be supplied by Siemens, the remaining 120 will be primarily manufactured domestically capacities and expertise over six years.

The company has also supplied 120 engines for trainsets, and 60 engines for railbuses.

Other

The company also supplies engines for marine use, and dual fuel engines for powerplants.

== See also ==
- Iranian railway industry
- AD43C, diesel locomotive class using DESA Diesel built Ruston RK 215 type engines
