= RC4 (disambiguation) =

RC4 can refer to:

- RC4 – cipher used for computer data protection
- Battle of Route Coloniale 4 – battle during the Vietnam War
- Iranian Railways RC4 – Iranian electric locomotive
- SJ Rc4 – Swedish electric locomotive
