= Railway industry in Iran =

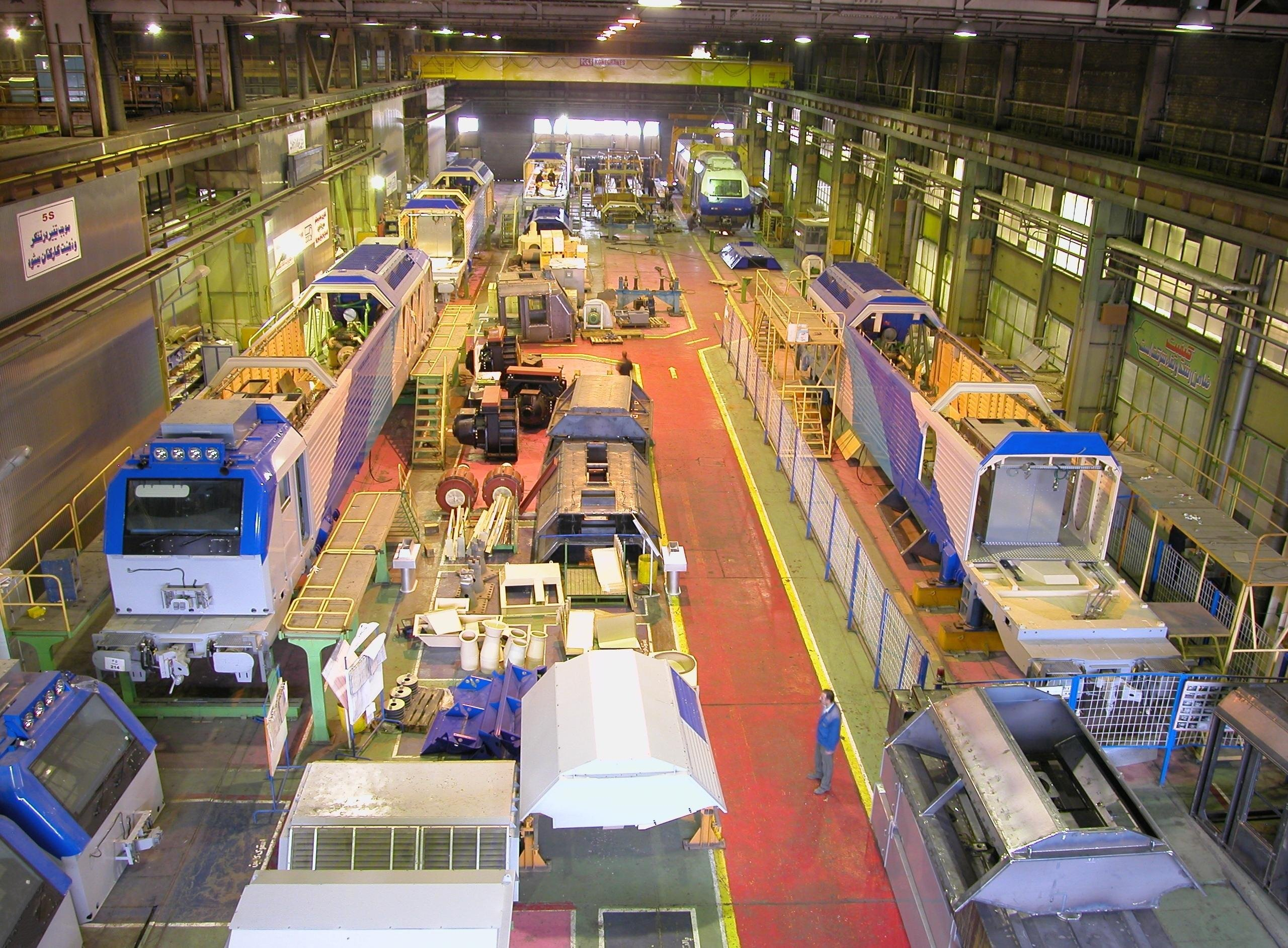
Wagon Pars's locomotive production line

The railway equipment industry in Iran started its activity with wagon production.

It was formed by the inauguration of train-manufacturing company Wagon Pars in 1974. The railway is being developed with Iranian-government backing and forms a part of the Iranian Economic Reform Plan.

The Iran Khodro Rail Transport Industries Company (IRICO) was established in 2003 to produce passenger cars, and the Mapna Locomotive Engineering and Manufacturing Company was established in 2006 to manufacture locomotives.

In July 2012, a Mapna Locomotive Engineering and Manufacturing Company production plant was officially inaugurated. The plant is projected to manufacture 120 locomotives – with a maximum speed of 160 kilometres per hour (99 miles per hour) – each year.

== Iranian rail companies ==
- Arvin Tabriz Company – established in 1993, TSI certified Y25 bogie manufacturer; Freight wagons leasing service provider.
- Esfahan Steel Company (also known as Zob Ahan) – established 1994; rail production; U33
- Iran Heavy Diesel Manufacturing Company (also known as DESA Amol) – established in 1991, manufactures diesel-engines
- Iran Khodro Rail Transport Industries Company – established 2003; manufactures passenger rolling stock
- Iranian Railroad Industries Development Company – switches
- Jala Pardazan Alvand – designs and manufactures industrial parts in the railway and automotive industries
- Maharan – signaling
- Taam Locomotive Arya
- Mapna Locomotive Engineering and Manufacturing Company – established 2006; manufactures locomotives
- Polour Sabz – passenger wagons
- Tehran Wagon Manufacturing Company – Wagon Sazi Tehran
- Wagon Pars – established 1974; manufactures Freight trains, Passenger trains, diesel multiple units and locomotives

== See also ==
- Industry of Iran
- Islamic Republic of Iran Railways
