= Eurorunner =

Diesel–electric locomotives by Siemens

Siemens Eurorunner ER20 ER20 CF ER30
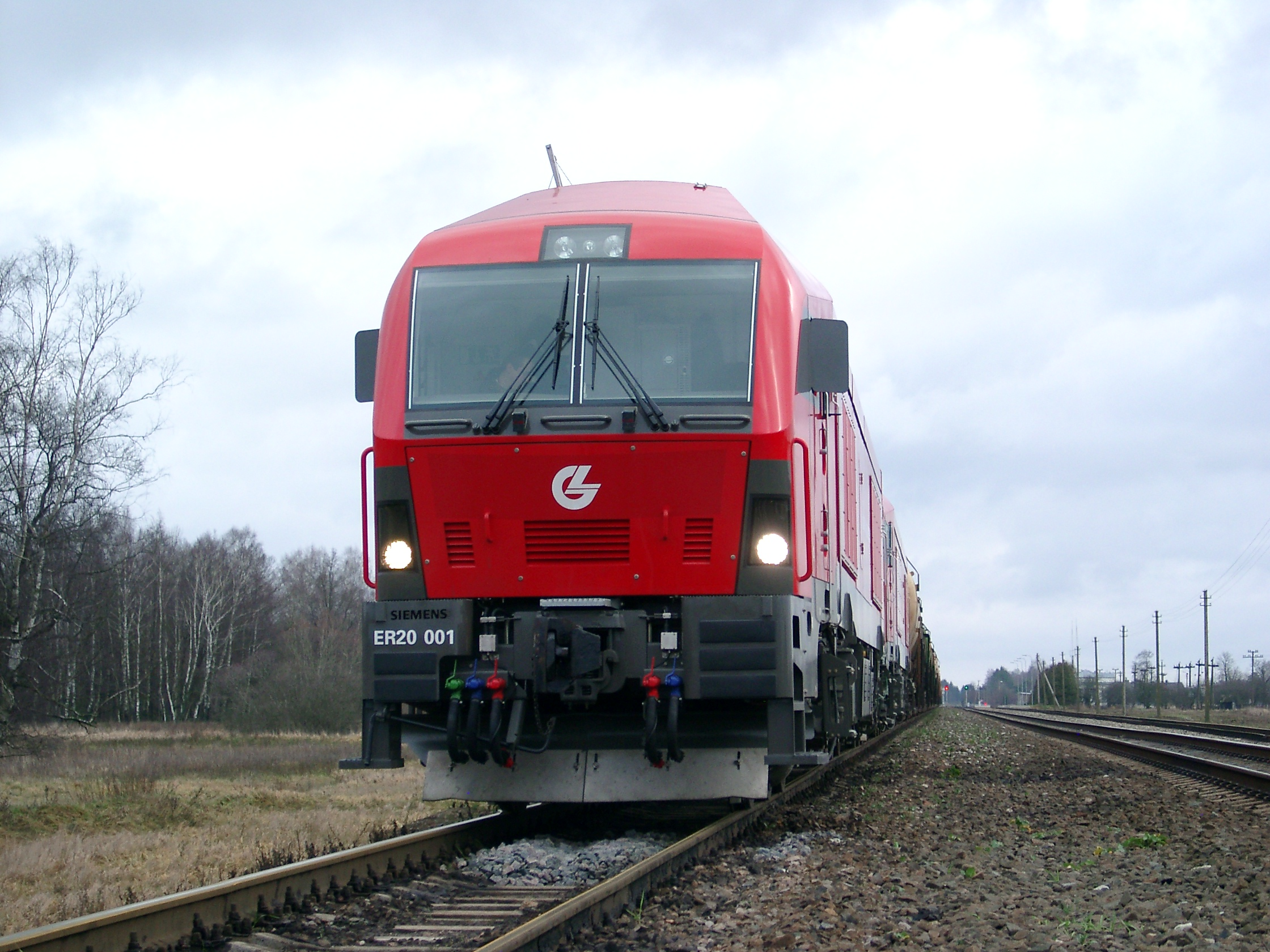
- ER20 CF of Lithuanian Railways
Type and origin
- Power type: Diesel electric
- Builder: Siemens
- Total produced: 181
Specifications
- Configuration
  - UIC: ER20: Bo′Bo′; ER20 CF, ER 30: Co′Co′
- Gauge: ER20, ER20 CF, ER30: 1,435 mm (4 ft 8 1/2 in) standard gauge ER20 CF, ER 30 : 1,520 mm
- Wheelbase: 10 362 mm between bogie pivots
- Length: 19 275 mm
- Width: 2870 mm
- Loco weight: ER20: 80 t ER20 CF: 135.7 t
- Fuel type: Diesel fuel
- Fuel capacity: ER20: 2500–4000 L ER20 CF: 7000 L ER 30: 5000–7000 L
- Prime mover: MTU 16 V 4000 R41
- Engine type: V16 Diesel
- Transmission: Electric
- Loco brake: SW-GPRmZ+E
- Train brakes: pneumatic and dynamic brakes
- Safety systems: ETCS, PZB, Sifa
Performance figures
- Maximum speed: ER30: 120–160 km/h (75–100 mph); ER20: 140 km/h (90 mph); ER20 CF: 120 km/h (75 mph)
- Power output: ER20, ER20 CF: 2,000 kW (2,700 hp); ER 30 :2,700–3,500 kW (3,600–4,700 hp); ER 20 (ÖBB Rh 2016): 1,600–1,750 kW (2,150–2,350 hp) available for traction
- Tractive effort: ER20: 235 kN starting ER20 CF, ER30: 450 kN
Career
- Locale: Germany, Austria, Hong Kong, Lithuania, Slovakia

The Eurorunner family of locomotives are a series of medium- to high-power diesel–electric locomotives built by Siemens for the European market. Introduced from 2002 onwards, they share design characteristics with the successful Eurosprinter range of electric locomotives, also built by Siemens.

The main initial order for these locomotives was for 100 of the four-axle ER20 for ÖBB and designated ÖBB type 2016, and commonly called Hercules; further smaller orders from smaller railway companies have also been fulfilled. Later six-axle versions ER20CF were produced for Lithuanian Railways. A higher-power version ER30 is also offered but has not resulted in any orders as of 2010.

Production of the Eurorunner ceased by 2012, replaced by Siemens Vectron diesel-engined versions.

== Technical ==
The locomotive is designed to be made of as few parts as possible, and is of modular construction, with separate components (engine, electronics etc.) kept in separately fabricated units and are designed to be easily replaceable.

Marketing by Siemens has heavily emphasised the locomotive's energy-saving characteristics, as well as the technology used to reduce particulate emissions.

The locomotives have a supercharged 16-cylinder diesel engine of the MTU 4000 series developing 2,000 kW of power which drive a three-phase brushless alternator. At idle 8 of the 16 cylinders can be turned off, reducing fuel consumption and emissions.

The three-phase electrical supply is rectified to DC to supply a pulse-width modulator, which in turn generates a three-phase electrical supply to the traction motors (which are of the induction type) – the four traction motors are connected in parallel.

Electrical taps from the main DC power supply also provide power to other electronically controlled power supplies, including those that power the cooling fans (also known as 'blowers') at 440 V 3-phase 60 Hz. The power supply for passenger operations (coach heating, lighting etc.) is optional and is located separately under the main frame whereas the rest of the electronic equipment is mounted in the body of the vehicle.

In addition the electrodynamic brakes can charge both a battery pack, as well as high capacity capacitors – meaning that energy absorbed on deceleration can be reused later on. This feature saves emissions and fuel consumption – if the batteries and capacitors are full, a roof-mounted set of resistors provides the remainder or additional rheostatic braking. The maximum electrical braking effort is 100 kN (22,000 lb_{f}). For additional braking a pneumatic braking system is included.

The locomotives are equipped for push-pull operation (with control car for instance) and for multiple-unit operation (see Multiple-unit train control.)

=== Eurorunner ER20 C ===
The six-axled locomotives have a number of changes in addition to the change of bogie type: both mass, tractive effort and braking effort are increased. The modularity concept used in the 4-axle versions remains unchanged. One notable difference between the two is that the ER20 C models have one pulse-width modulator (electronic power supply: generic term 'inverter') per bogie (i.e. 2 ), whereas the ER 20B models have only one pulse-width modulator in total. In addition the arrangement of modular components is changed from the Bo'Bo' versions. This model also sports a water closet.

=== Eurorunner ER20 CF ===
The Eurorunner ER20 CF is a freight version of the ER20, with maximum speed and top speed tradeoff reduced to 120 km/h (75 mph) and 450 kN respectively. The HEP is also removed to save space and weight.

=== Eurorunner ER24 PC ===
The Eurorunner ER24 PC is derived from the ER20 CF, but with a Bo'Bo' axle configuration, 2,400 kW power output, a top speed of 160 km/h (99 mph), a lighter body mass, a smaller passenger tank and a single cab end.

=== Eurorunner ER30 ===
The Eurorunner ER30 was designed to be a modified version of the ER20 CF. The differences between the two were regarding their locomotive weight, power output, maximum speed and fuel capacity. It was canceled due to the low sales of the ER20 CF.

== History and operators ==
The initial order of the Eurorunner was of 100 units for Austrian Federal Railways ÖBB as locomotive type 2016.

Further locomotives were purchased by various companies:

organisation	location	number of units	date	comments
MTR Corporation (as Kowloon-Canton Railway Corporation)	Hong Kong	5	2003	named 8000 series
MRCE Dispolok	Europe	15	2003–2006	leasing company
StLB (Steiermärkische Landesbahnen)	Austria	2	2004/5	as 2016 series
LTE (LTE Logistik- und Transport- GmbH)	Austria	2	2004/5	as 2016 series
PRESS (Pressnitztalbahn)	Germany	2	2004/5	as 253 series
Eisenbahnen und Verkehrsbetriebe Elbe-Weser (EVB)	Germany	4	2005/7	as 420 series
CBrail	Luxembourg	3	2006	leasing company
WLE (Westfälische Landes Eisenbahn)	Germany	2	2007/9	
RTS Austria	Austria	2	2007/9	as class 2016
Osthannoversche Eisenbahnen (OHE)	Germany	3	2007	as 27000 series
Stern & Hafferl	Austria	1	2008	as Rh 2016
Angel Trains		12		leasing company
Lithuanian Railways	Lithuania	44	2007–2009	as ER20 series

Kowloon-Canton Railway Corporation of Hong Kong were an early customer, ordering five locomotives in 2001 for use hauling freight services on the Kowloon-Canton Railway. Nord-Ostsee-Bahn also operate ER20s as 'DE 2000'. These original locomotives were available in a passenger version; the equipment (such as electric train heat etc.) required for passenger operation was carried under the locomotives frame between the bogies and necessitated a reduction in the size of the fuel tank. Alternatively, it may be said that the freight version has a larger fuel tank.

Locomotives based in Germany have been called 'Class 253', but that code has been given to the Vossloh G2000, and the locomotives now answer to the name 'Class 223'; in Austria the designation is often 'Class 2016' since the original Austrian order for ÖBB had that number, the name 'Hercules' is also commonly used for this class since the original Austrian locomotive carried that name.In the Czech Republic they have been given 'Class 761' and are mainly operated by METRANS.

In 2007 Siemens announced variants available as a six-axle Co'Co' locomotive. The first order for this type came from Lithuanian Railways (Lietuvos Geležinkeliai or LG) for 34 of a 1,520 mm (4 ft 11 27/32 in) gauge freight-specific version; the new variant was given the reporting name ER 20 CF Higher-powered versions are also offered, designated ER30.

The passenger version is labelled ER 20 CU (U is for universal), and retrospectively the two-axle variants have been relabelled ER 20 BU or ER 20 BF for the universal (passenger) and freight versions respectively. (Originally the Bo'Bo' freight version reported as ER 20 F)

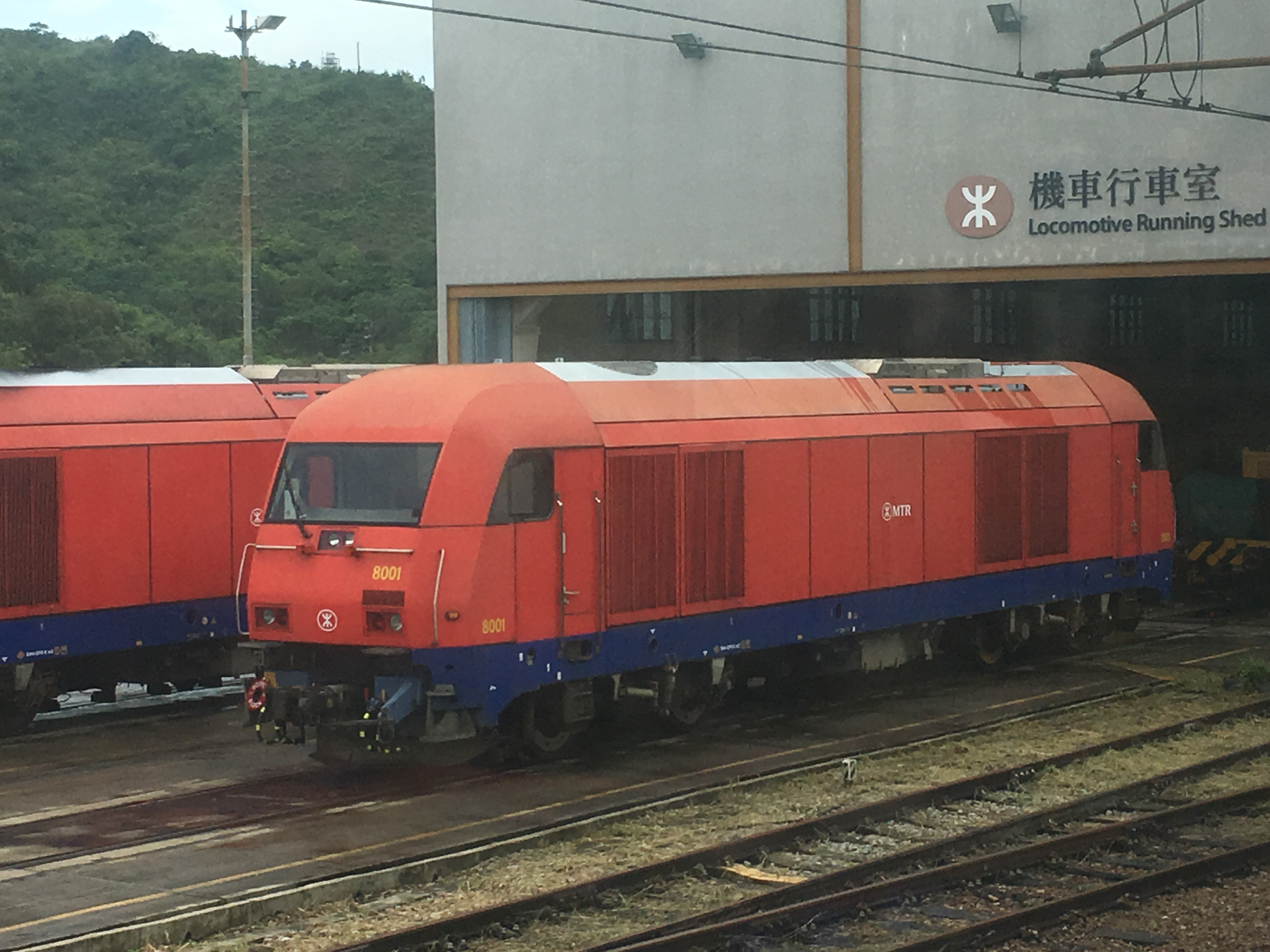

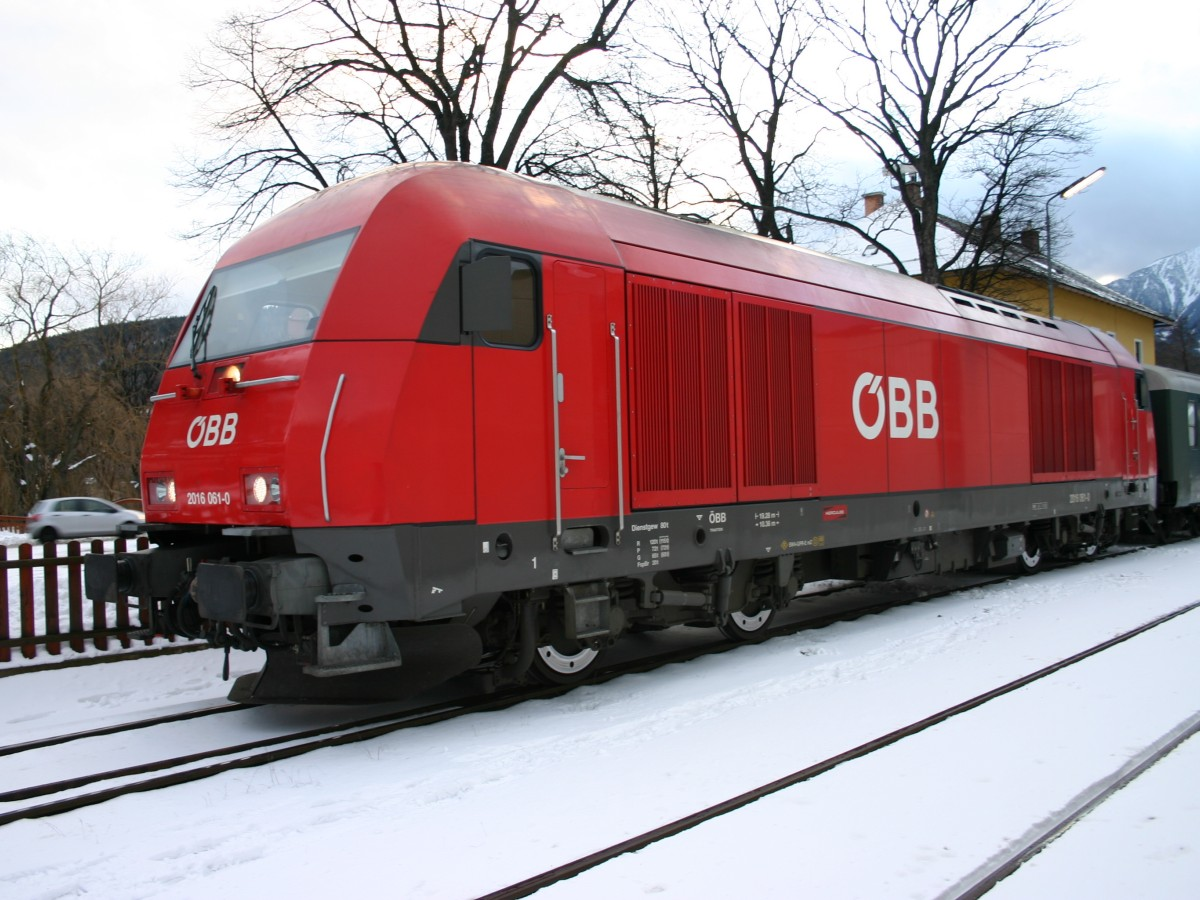

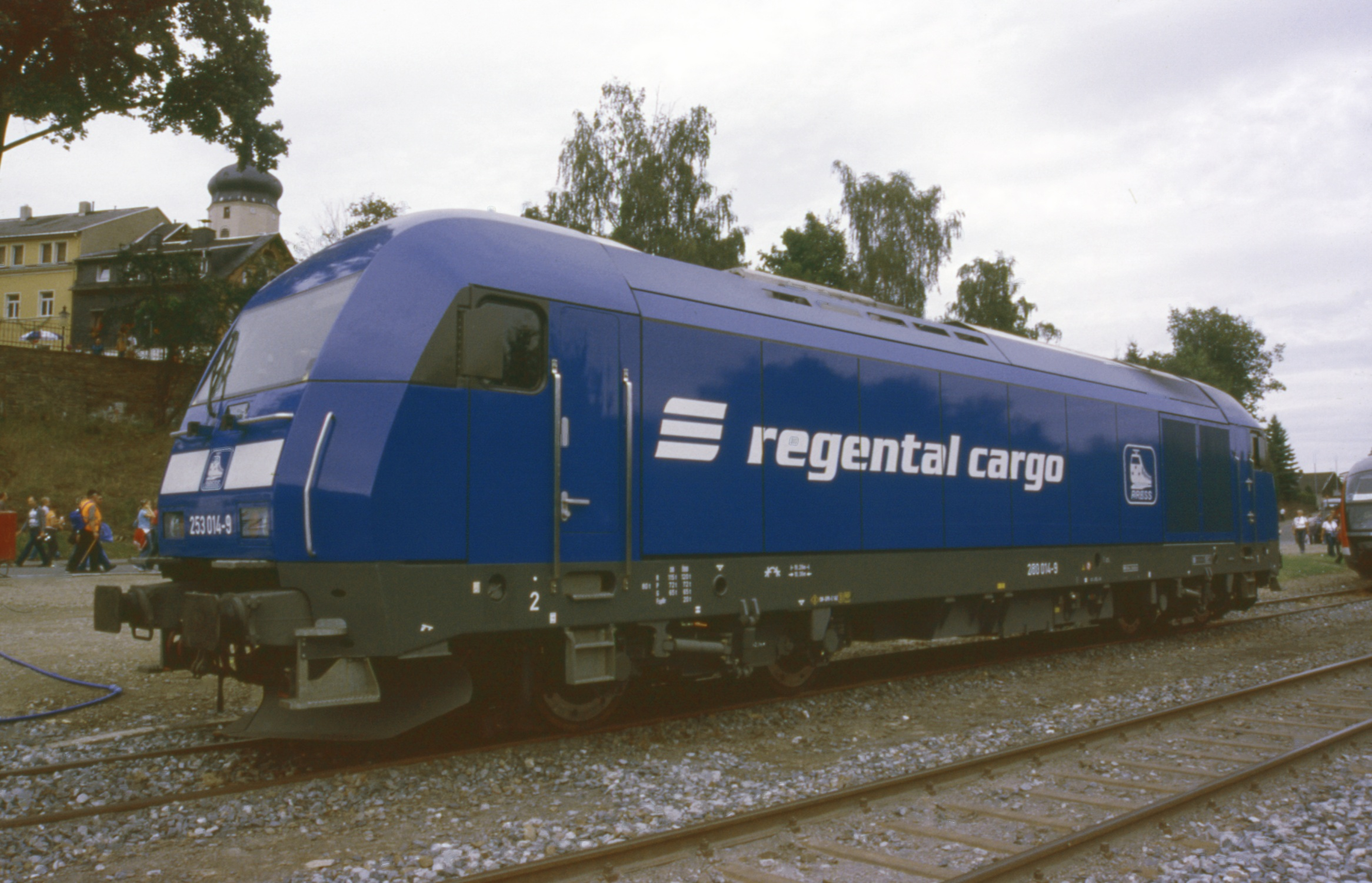

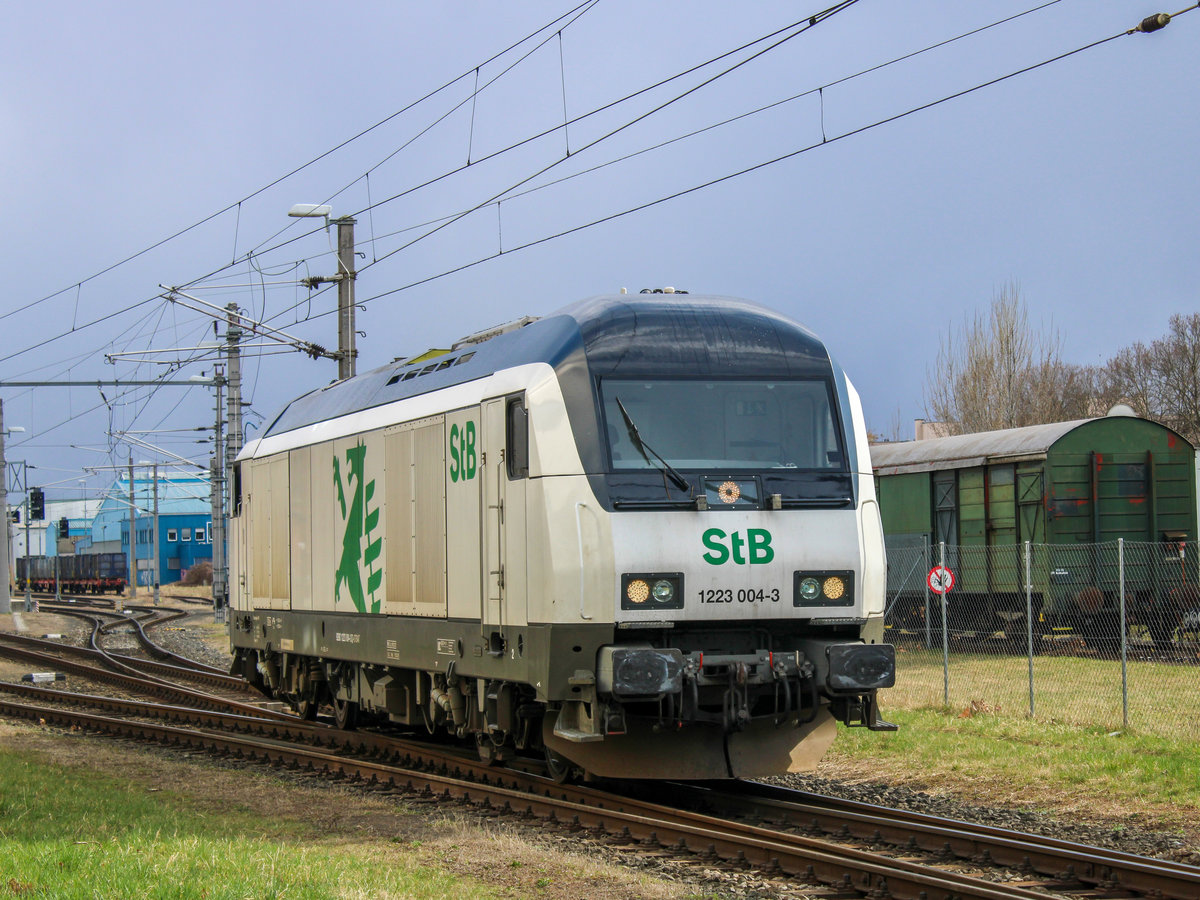

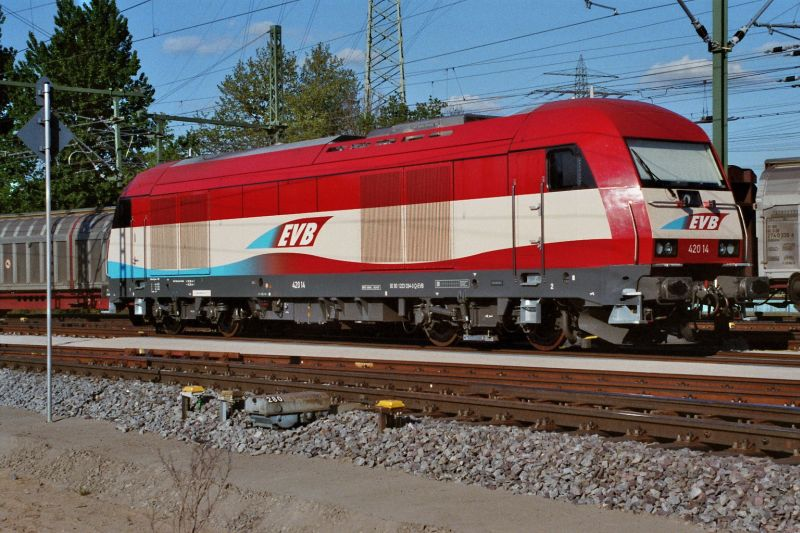

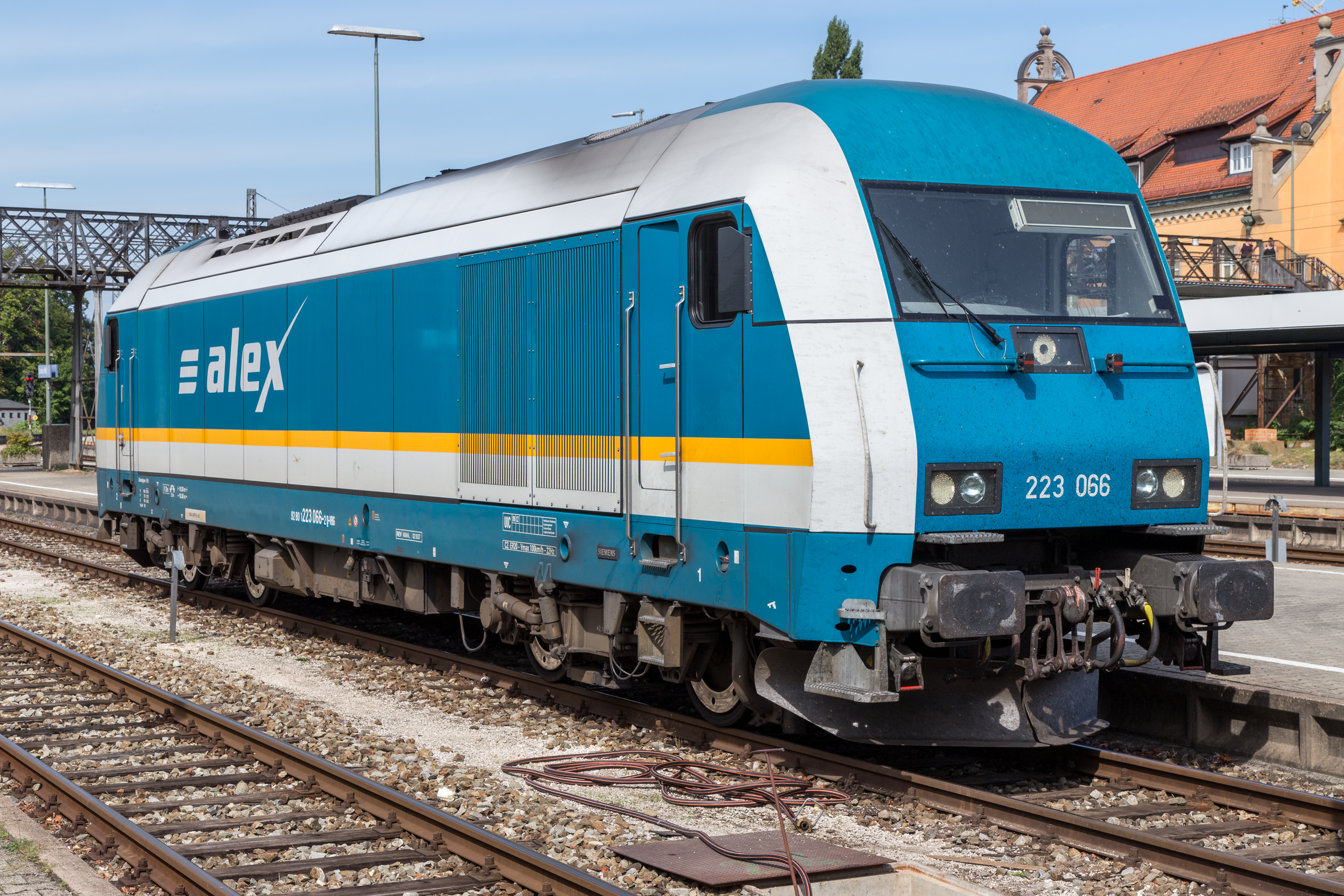

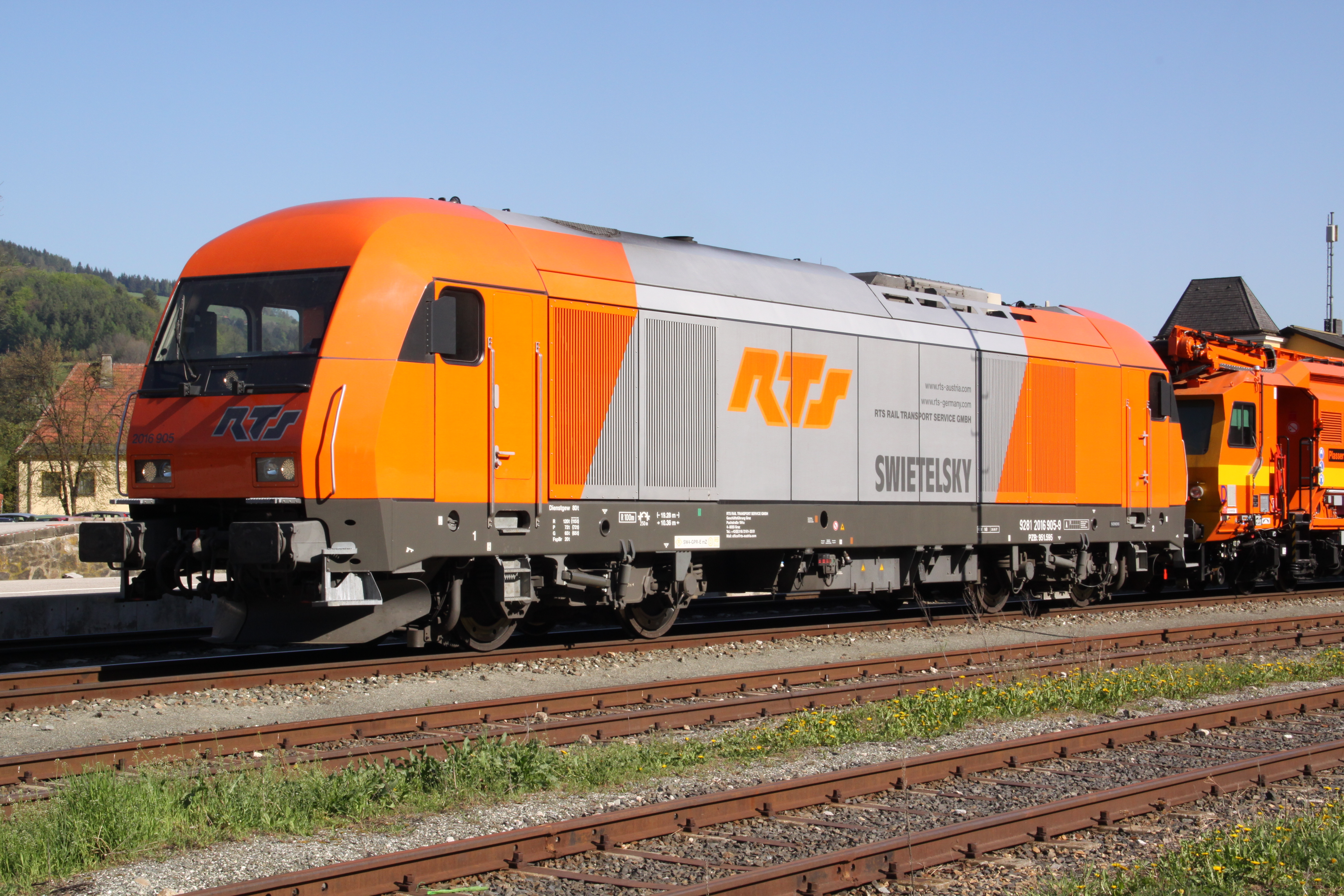

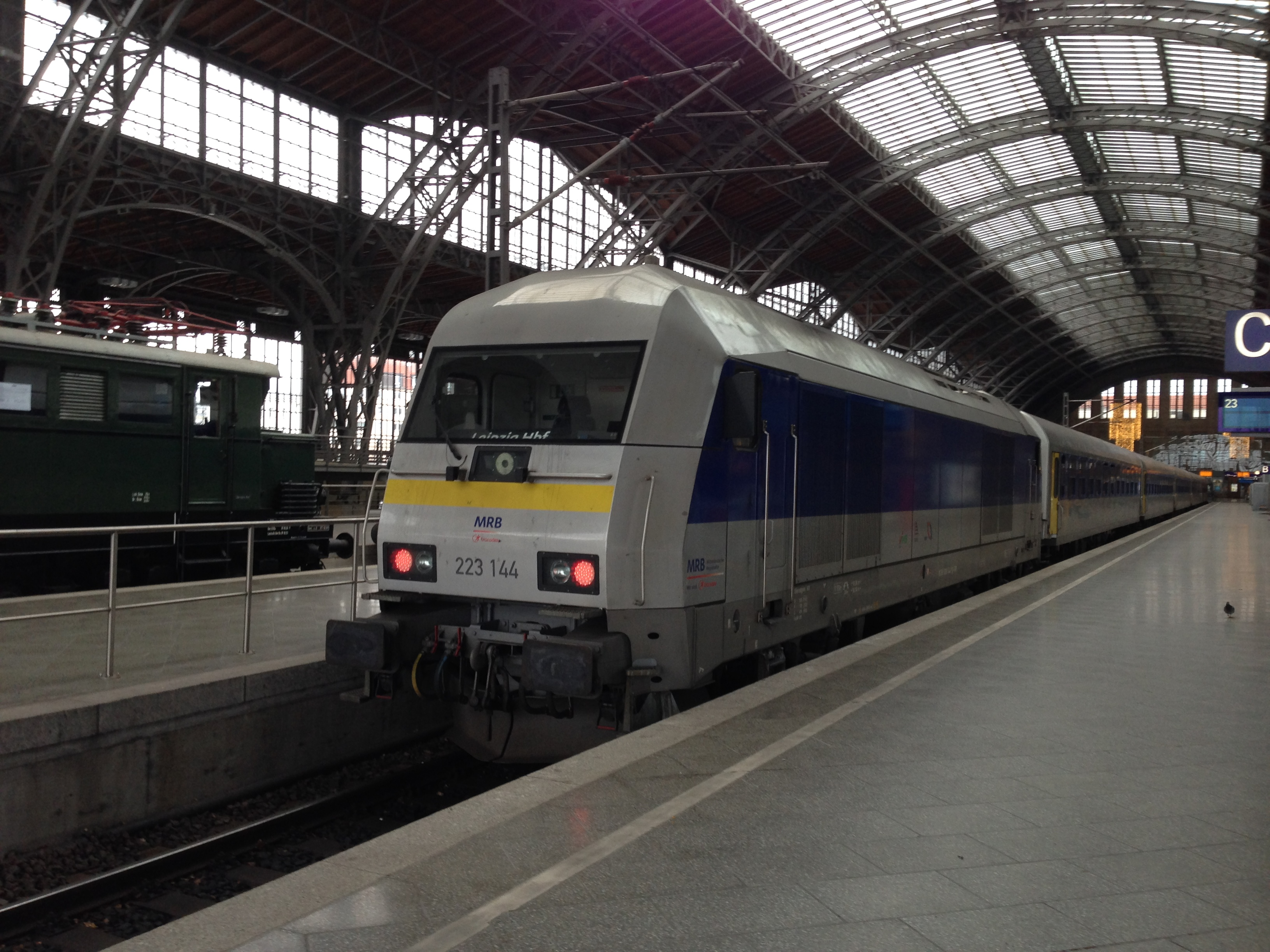

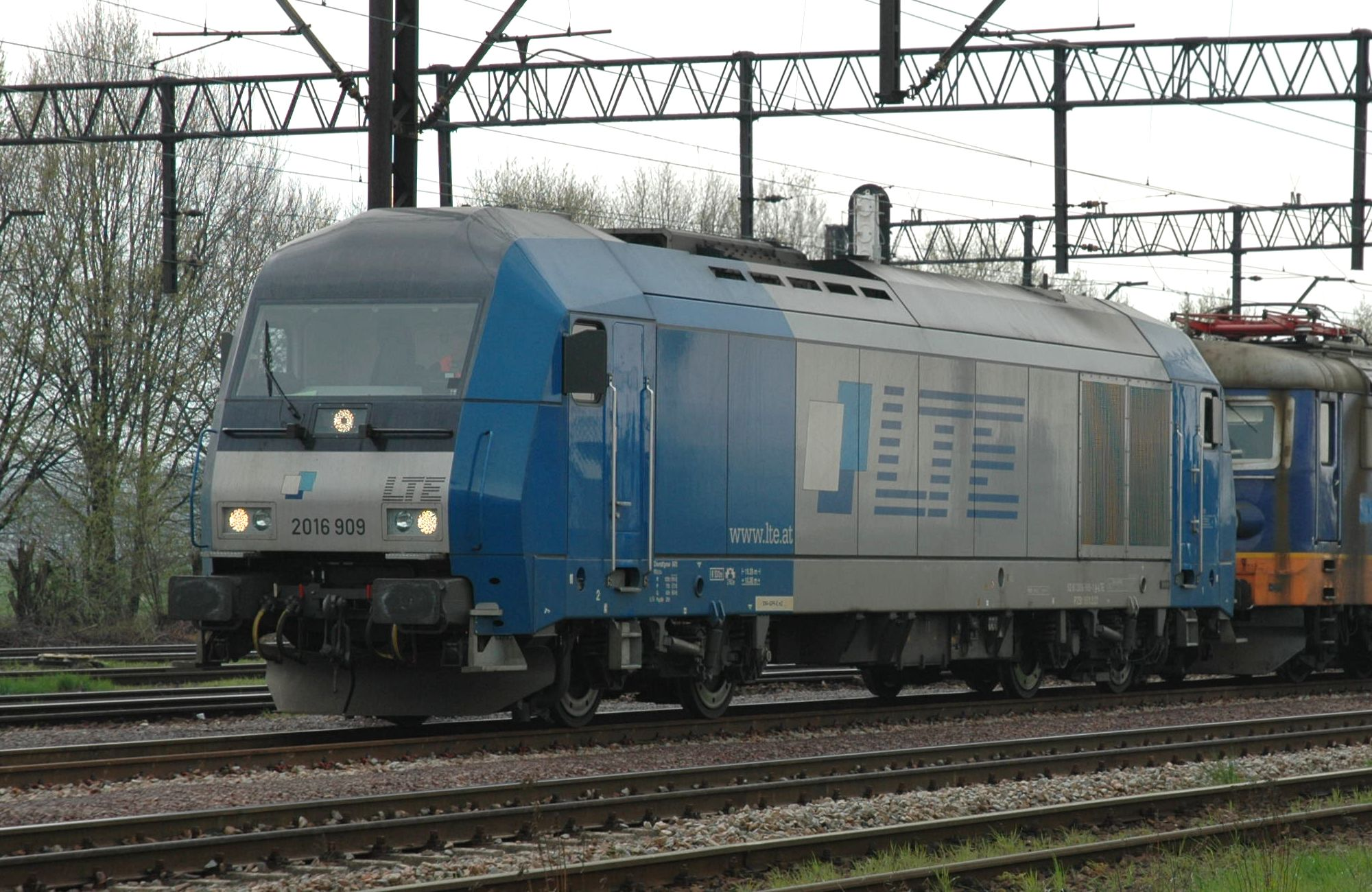

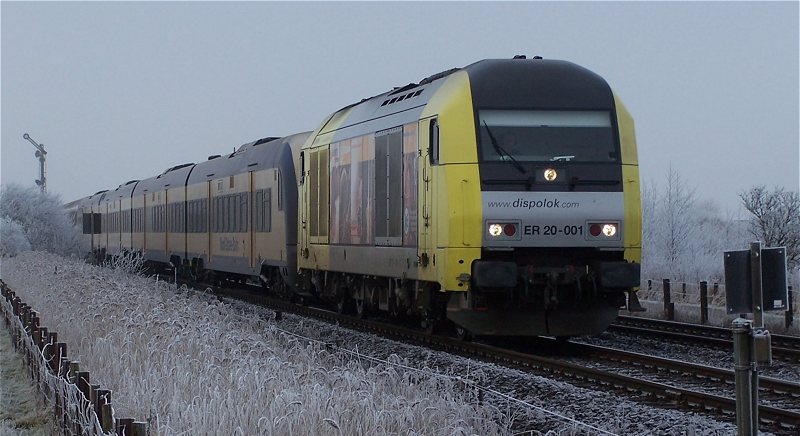

== See also ==
- Contemporary Siemens locomotive products
  - Siemens Eurosprinter - electrically powered related product
  - Siemens Asiarunner - Locomotive sold to Vietnam for meter gauge railway, contemporary to the EuroRunner
  - IranRunner - Eurorunner type locomotive for railways of Iran produced by Siemens and on license by MLC (Mapna Locomotive Engineering and Manufacturing Company)
- Contemporaries and potential competitors in the European diesel locomotive market:
  - Bombardier TRAXX
  - JT42CWR also known as "Class 66"
  - Vossloh Euro locomotive
  - Vossloh G2000
  - Alstom Prima locomotives
