= Iranian Rail Industries Development Co =

Rolling stock manufacturer

Iranian Rail Industries Development Co (IRICO)
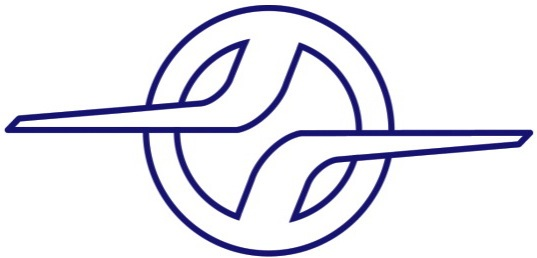
- Industry: Rail Transport
- Founded: 2003; 23 years ago
- Headquarters: Tehran, Iran
- Area served: Worldwide
- Products: Rail Transport, rolling stock
- Services: Passenger railways, Freight services, Bus transportation
- Owner: Iranian Golden Goal International Group, Green Refinement Company, PPS Kish Company
- Number of employees: 430 (2018)
- Parent: Iranian Golden Goal International Group (IGG Group)
- Website: iri.co.ir

Iranian Rail Industries Development Co (IRICO) (Persian: ایریکو, Iriku) is an Iranian manufacturer of passenger rolling stock. The company was founded in 2003 and began series production of rail vehicles in 2009. The company has several license manufactured rolling stock in cooperation such as Hyundai Rotem, Siemens, Stadler & CRRC Puzhen.

== History ==
Iranian Rail Industries Development Co (IRICO) was founded in with the aim of domestic manufacture of rolling stock including metro, suburban, light rail and monorail vehicles. A $45 million investment established a factory in Abhar, Zanjan province Iran.

Production at the plant began in February 2009 after a formal inauguration in December 2008; at inception the plant had a capacity of 100 vehicles p.a. with single shift working.

In 2004 Rotem entered into a technology transfer and manufacturing agreement (value €110 million) with IRICO for the supply of passenger trainsets; 24 units were to manufactured by Rotem in 2006, 24 assembled from CKD kits by IRICO, and the remainder manufactured by IRICO with Rotem assistance. The trains were manufactured for the Raja Passenger Train Company.

In 2010 IRICO won a contract to supply 135 vehicles for the Shiraz Metro.

In March 2016 IRICO was acquired by IGG Group.

The DMU contract was extended in December 2017 to another contract for supplying 450 DMU cars for increasing passenger transportation capacity of Iran. The first 150 vehicles will be built at Hyundai Rotem's plant in Changwon, Korea. The remaining 300 vehicles will be assembled locally by Iranian Rail Industries Development (IRICO). All 450 cars will be delivered within 78 months of contract signing. has been awarded a $US 856 million contract by Iranian Islamic Republic Railways (RAI) to supply 150 three-car DMUs.

== See also ==
- Iranian railway industry
