= RK 215 =

The RK 215 is a line of diesel engines built by MAN (previously Ruston). The RK 215 series is a large four-stroke diesel engine that has an 11-liter displacement per cylinder.

RK215 diesel engines have also been manufactured in Iran by DESA diesel.

== Applications ==
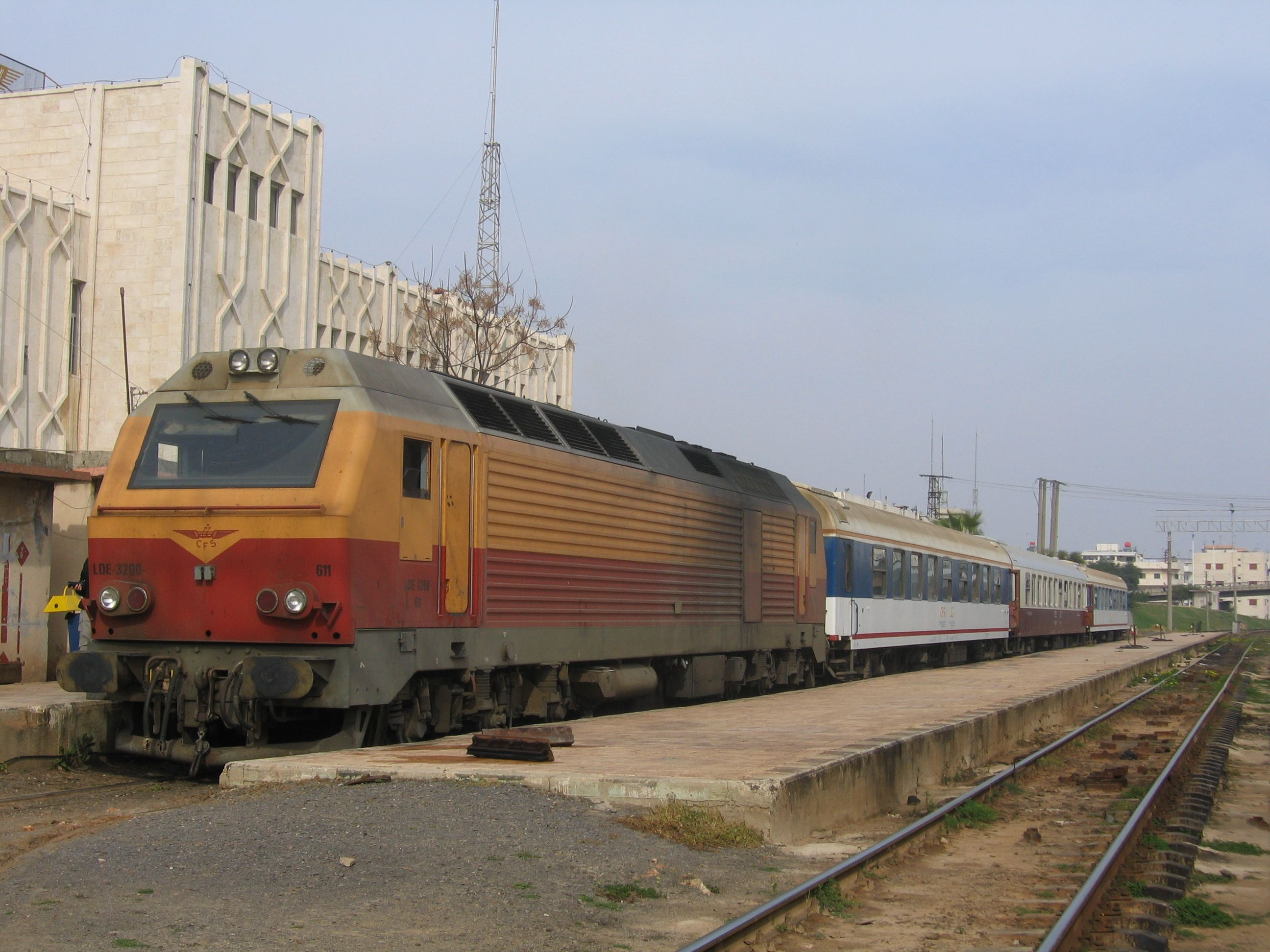
Syrian railway LDE 3200 equipped with RK 215 diesel engine

Twelve- and sixteen-cylinder versions have been used in main line diesel electric locomotives, including Alstom's LDE 3200 locomotive for Syria and M9 for Sri Lanka (12-cylinder), and the AD43C for Iran as well as the KTM Class 29 for Malaysia (16-cylinder).

Like most MAN engines, the RK 215 is also sold for stationary and marine use. It is available in I6, V8, V12 and V16 configurations.
