= Caspian Port =

Coordinates: 37.2740°N 49.3837°E

Caspian Port بندر کاسپین
- Interactive map of Caspian Port بندر کاسپین

Location
- Country: Iran
- Location: Rasht and Anzali; Gilan Province, Iran

Details
- Operated by: Under construction
- Owned by: Anzali Free Zone
- Size of harbour: 8.5 km
- Land area: 3,510,000 m
- No. of wharfs: 25
- No. of piers: 2

Caspian Port (Persian: بندر کاسپین) is a seaport located in Anzali Trade-Industrial Freezone, Gilan Province, Iran.

The port is a key element in the International North–South Transport Corridor Caspian route and has been connected to the Iranian railway network since June 2024.
