= Sri Lanka Railways M9 =

Class of M9 Sri Lanka diesel-electric locomotives

M9
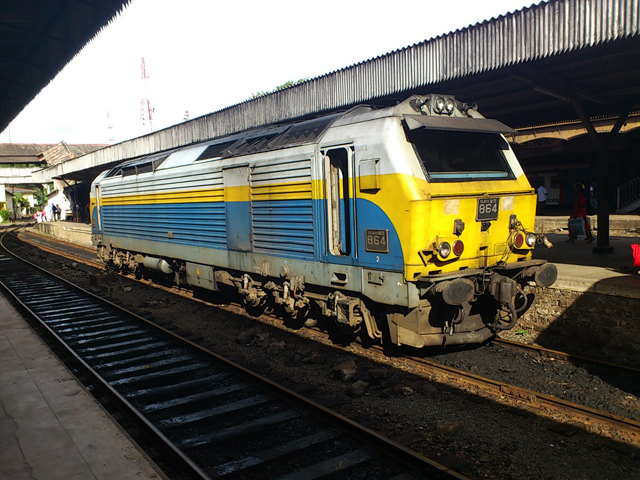
- M9 No. 864
Type and origin
- Power type: Diesel
- Builder: Alstom
- Model: AD 32C
- Build date: 2000
- Total produced: 10
Specifications
- Configuration
  - UIC: Co'Co'
- Gauge: 1,676 mm (5 ft 6 in)
- Minimum curve: 100 m (109 yd 1 ft)
- Loco weight: 100.56 t (98.97 long tons; 110.85 short tons)
- Fuel capacity: 5,000 L (1,100 imp gal; 1,300 US gal)
- Sandbox cap.: 480 L (110 imp gal; 130 US gal)
- Prime mover: Ruston 12 RK 215T engine
- Engine type: V12, 4 stroke diesel
- Cylinders: 12
Performance figures
- Maximum speed: 110 km/h (68 mph)
- Power output: 3,200 hp (2,400 kW) @1000rpm
Career
- Numbers: 864 to 873
- Official name: Class M9
- Locale: Sri Lanka
- Current owner: Sri Lanka Railways

The Sri Lankan Railways M9 locomotive is a mainline 6 axle Co'Co' diesel electric locomotive built by Alstom (manufacturers code AD 32C) and imported in 2000 for the Sri Lanka Railways.

The locomotives initially had both electrical and mechanical problems, and several were out of service for several years. In 2010 the process of returning the fleet to service began.

== History ==
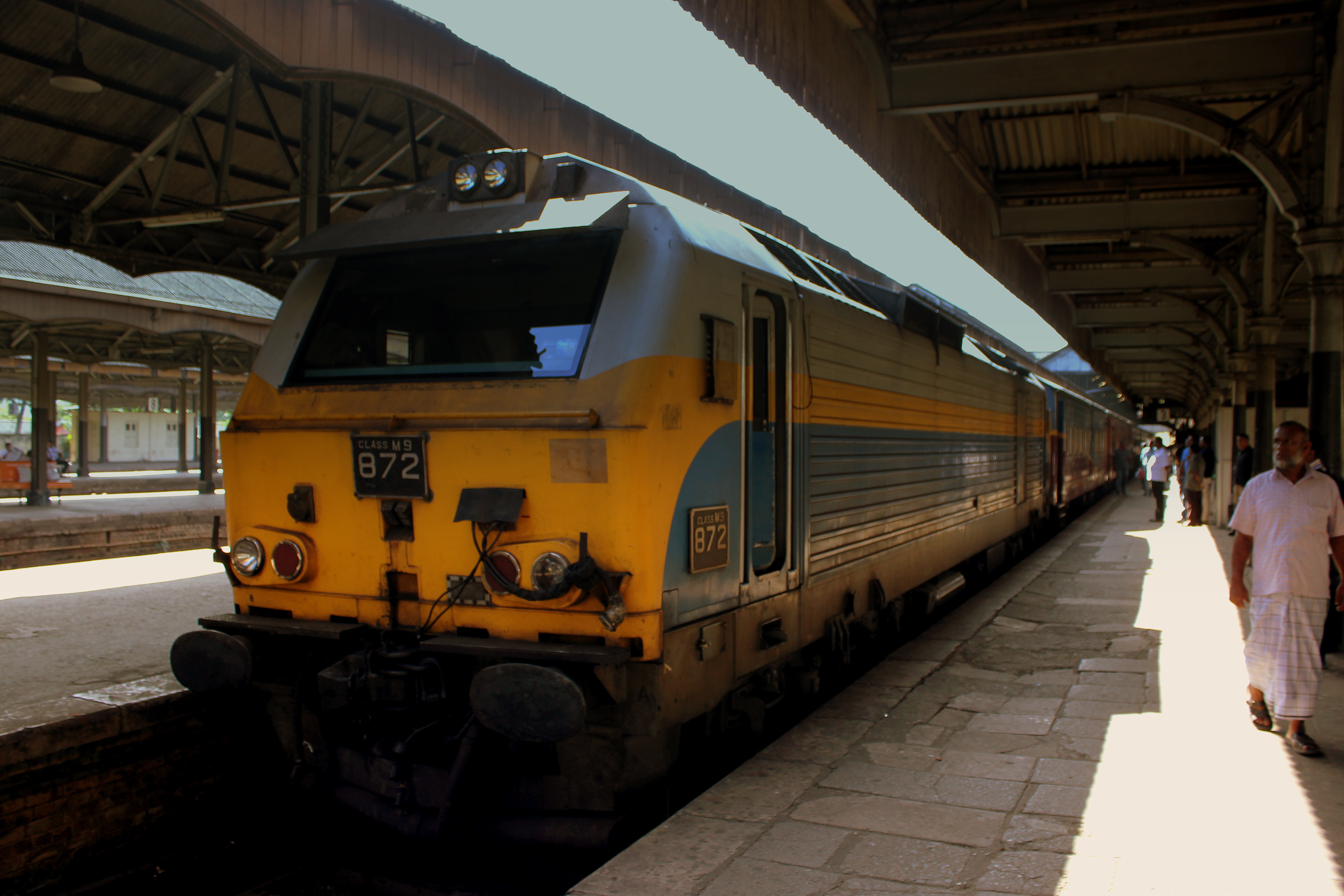
M9 Locomotive

Ten units were ordered in 1997 and delivered in 2000, costing 190 million Sri Lankan rupees each. By 2010 only 3 were in operation due to technical problems, Various problems were described including engine malfunction, and problems with the engine control units, as well as the machines requiring modifications for use on curving track.

The delay in returning the locomotives to service was ascribed to an unaffordability of spare parts, and prohibitive cost of work by foreign firms.

The first of the 7 inoperative locomotives, number 869, was returned to service after 6 years in September 2010, following work by the Arthur C. Clarke Institute for Modern Technologies (ACCIMT) and the Industrial Technology Institute (ITI).

=== Operation ===
M9s were not allowed on line above Nawalapitiya, Kelani Valley Line and Matale line.

== See also ==
- Locomotives of Sri Lanka Railways
- Sri Lanka Railways
- Sri Lanka Railways
