= Iranian Railways AD43C =

AD43C
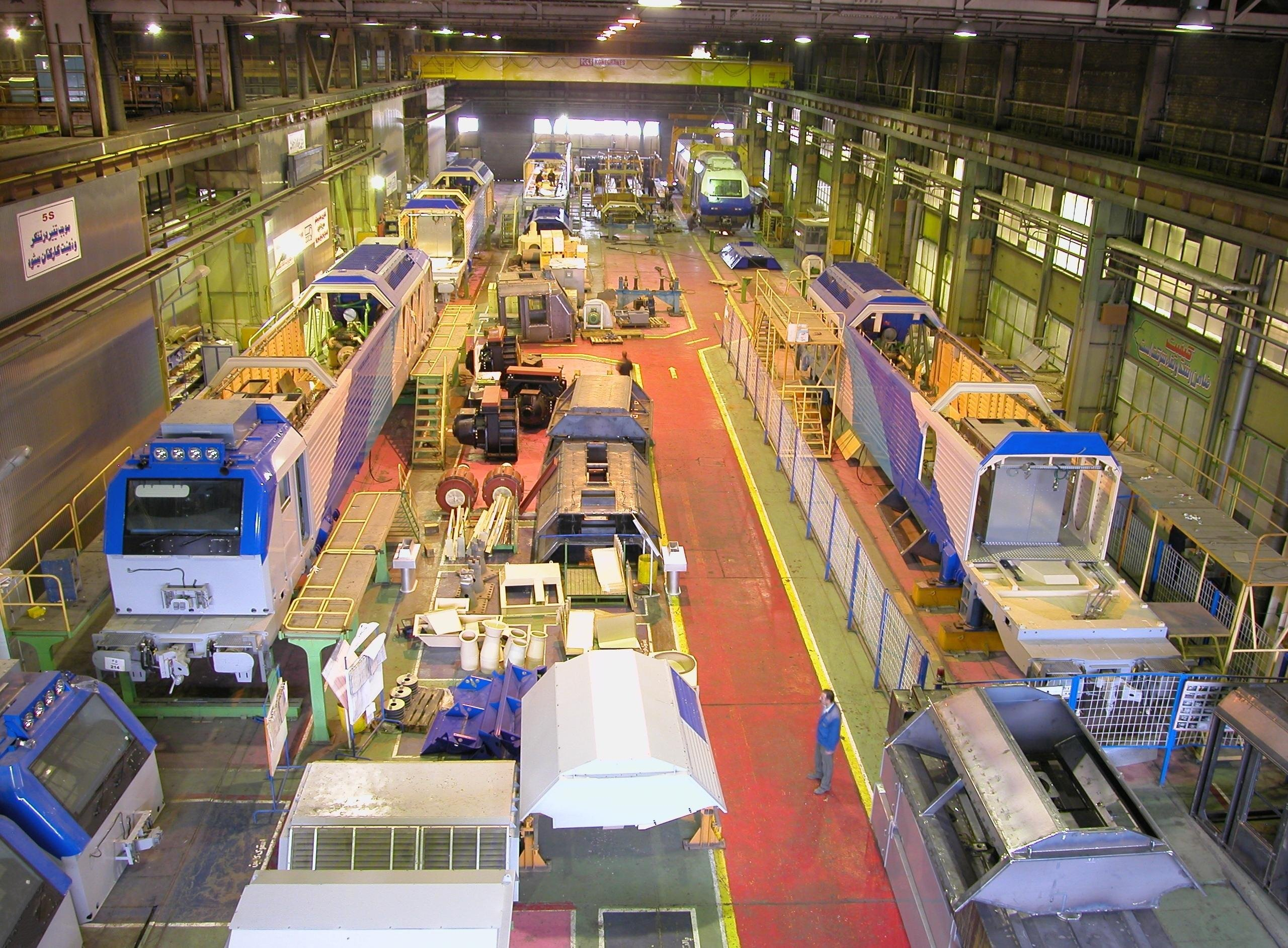
- AD43Cs under construction at Wagon Pars (2009)
Type and origin
- Power type: Diesel–electric
- Designer: Alstom
- Builder: Alstom / Ruston (first 20 units); Wagon Pars; Desa diesel (remainder)
- Total produced: 120
Specifications
- Configuration
  - UIC: Co´Co'
- Gauge: 1,435 mm (4 ft 8 1/2 in)
- Length: frame 21.540 m (70 ft 8.0 in) / 22.790 m (74 ft 9.2 in) over buffers 24.030 m (78 ft 10.1 in)
- Width: 2,850 mm (9 ft 4 in)
- Height: 4,280 mm (14 ft 1 in)
- Axle load: Freight versions : 20.5 or 23 tonnes (20.2 or 22.6 long tons; 22.6 or 25.4 short tons)*; Passenger version : 20.5 tonnes (20.2 long tons; 22.6 short tons)
- Loco weight: 123 t (121 long tons; 136 short tons)†
- Fuel capacity: 9,200 L (2,000 imp gal; 2,400 US gal)
- Sandbox cap.: 80 L (18 imp gal; 21 US gal) minimum capacity
- Prime mover: Ruston 16 RK 215 diesel
- Alternator: Alstom AT 14
- Traction motors: Alstom 6FRA 4564 forced ventilation
- Transmission: AC/AC electric of ONIX type Alstom ONIX 1500 water-cooled IGBT inverter
- MU working: 3 units of same type
- Loco brake: ~220 kN (49,000 lb_{f}) maximum (electrical dynamic)
- Train brakes: air
Performance figures
- Maximum speed: Freight version : 110 km/h (68 mph); Passenger version 150 km/h (93 mph)
- Power output: 3,160 kW (4,300 metric horsepower; 4,240 horsepower)
- Tractive effort: starting Freight version : 542 kN (122,000 lb_{f}); Passenger version : 482.5 kN (108,500 lb_{f})
Career
- Operators: Islamic Republic of Iran Railways
- ballasted † with 5,000 L (1,100 imp gal; 1,300 US gal) fuel, 480 L (110 imp gal; 130 US gal) sand

The AD43C is a type of mainline 6 axle Co'Co' diesel locomotive designed by Alstom and used by the Islamic Republic of Iran Railways (RAI). It was in production from 2000. Delivery started in 2002.

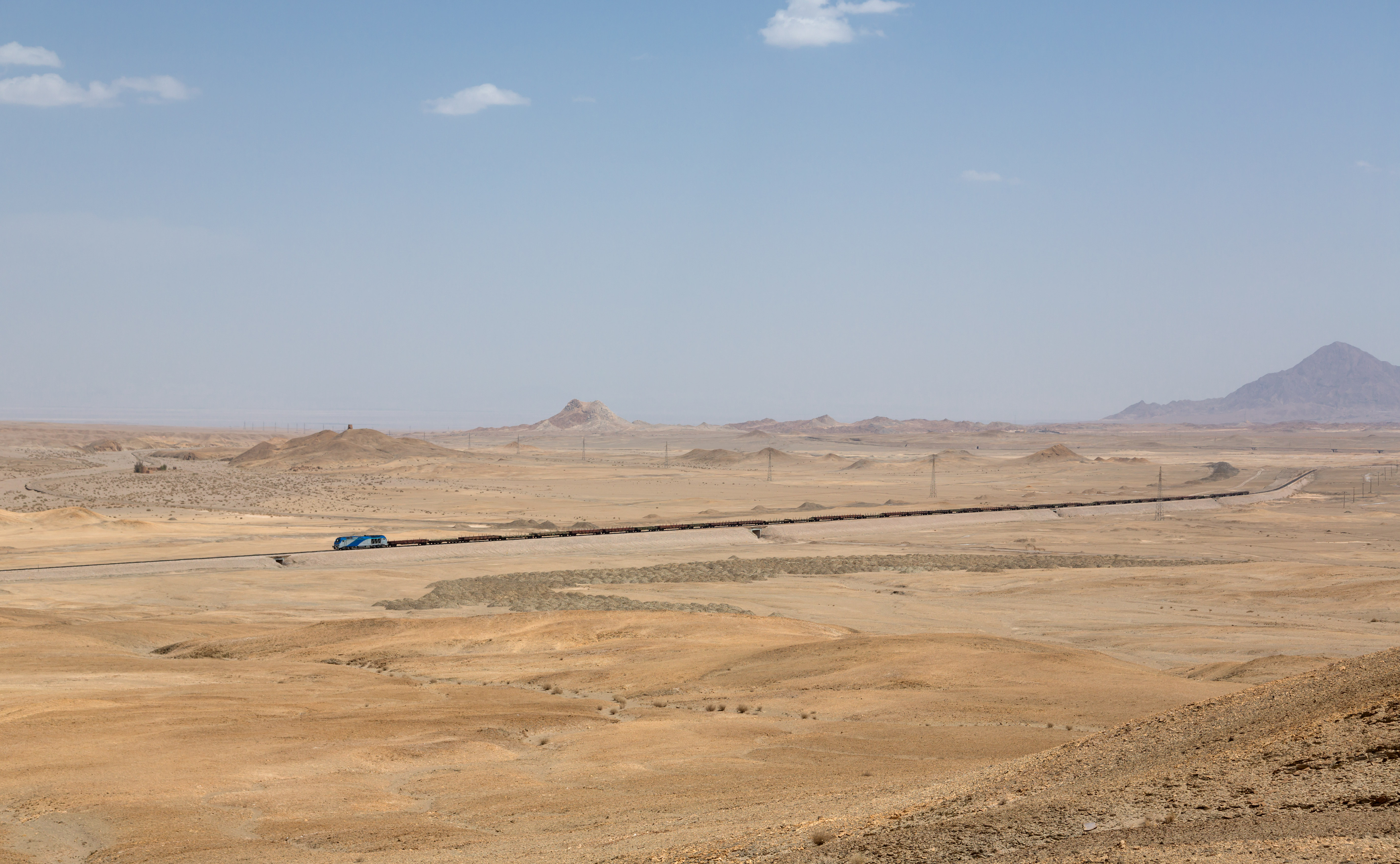
AD43C with a freight train

Alstom designated the vehicle with product code Prima DE 43 C AC.

== Background ==
In 1998 GEC Alstom won an order valued at $125 million (later valued at €192 million) for the supply of 100 mixed use locomotives for Islamic Republic of Iran Railways. The first 20 units were to be manufactured at Alstom's factory in Belfort, France, the remainder at Wagon Pars in Iran. (Note: Wagon Pars undertook superstructure and bogie manufacturing, as well as assembly and commissioning) After production of an initial batch by Ruston the remaining engines were to be built by DESA in Iran under a technology transfer agreement.

== Design ==
The locomotives are a 6-axle Co'Co' twin cab design, incorporating a RK 215 engine with a power at rail of 2,880 kW (3,860 hp). After premature failures both in engine and turbocharger RAI has de-rated the engine power gradually up to 2400 Kw.

Three variants were produced, a passenger version with a 150 km/h (93 mph) top speed and a 20.5-tonne (20.2-long-ton; 22.6-short-ton) axle load, and two freight versions with a 110 km/h (68 mph) top speed and either a 20.5-or-23-tonne (20.2-or-22.6-long-ton; 22.6-or-25.4-short-ton) axle load., Only two prototypes of ballasted locomotives had been introduced;as, the ballasts limited the engine room space and higher center of gravity raised concerns, the ballasts were later removed completely. The passenger locomotives were later assigned for freight service because of low reliability and introduction of more reliable ER24PC locomotives.

== Current conditions ==
As of the early of 2016 only a third of AD43C locomotives are in revenue service. These locomotives have undergone substantial modifications since RAI put them into service. Most of the out of service locomotives have been cannibalized for salvaging components to make operation of the in-service locomotives possible. As maintaining of the locomotives in service out-costs their revenue, Iranian railways has decided to retrofit these locomotives with other engines.

== See also ==
- Iranian locomotives
- IranRunner
