= Cham Sangar =

Cham Sangar چم سنگر
- Village
- Location within Iran
- Coordinates: 33°44′06″N 47°14′48″E
- Country: Iran
- Province: Lorestan
- County: Kuhdasht
- Bakhsh: Darb-e Gonbad
- Rural District: Darb-e Gonbad

Population (2006)
  - Total: 409
- Time zone: UTC+3:30 (IRST)
  - Summer (DST): UTC+4:30 (IRDT)

Cham Sangar (Persian: چم سنگر; also known as Sar Sangar) is a village in Darb-e Gonbad Rural District, Darb-e Gonbad District, Kuhdasht County, Lorestan Province, Iran. At the 2006 census, its population was 409, in 73 families.
