= DH4 IRAN =

German rail units

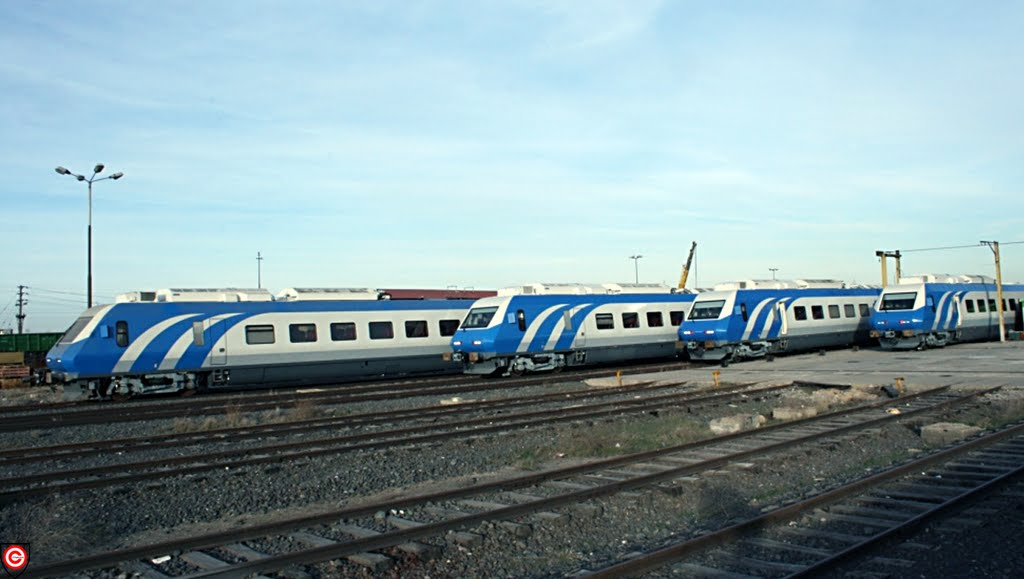
Siemens DMUs manufactured in Iran, 2007

The rail units (DMU) delivered by Siemens AG and employed by the operator RAJA consist of multiple-units being composed of three different car types (A-car, B-car, and C-car). These cars can be coupled up to a train set length of eight cars. The minimum configuration consists of three cars (A-car, C-car, B-car).

The train sets are driven by internal combustion engines powered by diesel fuel. Each car is equipped with a traction unit consisting of a diesel engine, a turbo transmission, a hydrostatic driven auxiliary drive system and a three-phase auxiliary generator.

The train sets can be operated in multiple traction consisting of identically composed units. The maximum configuration is a multiple train set consisting of 12 cars. Any orientation of units to form a multiple traction trains is possible (coupling of A-car to A-car, A-car to B-car and B-car to B-car). Top speeds are unknown.
