= Iranian Railways RC4 =

Class of Iranian electric locomotives

RC4
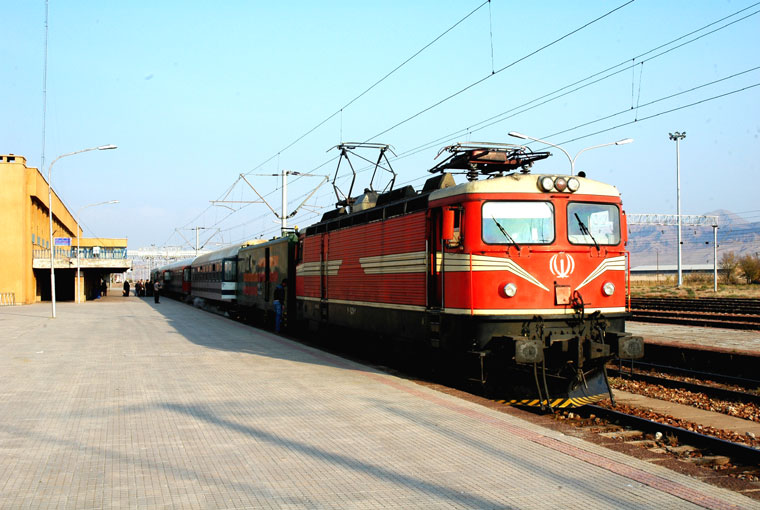
Type and origin
- Power type: Electric
- Builder: ASEA,
- Model: SJ Rc
- Build date: 1979-1980
Specifications
- Configuration
  - AAR: B-B
  - UIC: Bo-Bo
- Gauge: 1,435 mm (4 ft 8 1/2 in) standard gauge
- Wheel diameter: 1,200 mm (3 ft 11 in)
- Wheelbase: 2,500 mm (8 ft 2 in)
- Length: 16,000 mm (52 ft 6 in)
- Width: 2,800 mm (9 ft 2 in)
- Height: 3,960 mm (13 ft 0 in)
- Loco weight: 80 metric tons (79 long tons; 88 short tons)
- Electric system/s: 25 kV AC catenary
- Current pickup: Pantograph
- Traction motors: DC
Performance figures
- Maximum speed: 100 km/h (62 mph)
- Power output: 3,600 kW (4,800 hp)
- Tractive effort: 240 kN (54,000 lb_{f})
Career
- Operators: RAI
- Number in class: 8
- Disposition: in service

The RAI R-C-4 is a class of 4 axle Bo'Bo' electric locomotives used by the Islamic Republic of Iran Railways; the units have a similar design to the Swedish SJ Rc4.

These locomotives were purchased in 1982, in a number of 8 units, from Sweden to serve on the only electric line in the country between Tabriz and Jolfa stations, with a length of 146 km. Due to the steep slopes of up to 29 in a thousand on this axis, the operation of moving numerous freight trains to the former Soviet Union, and the inability of GM locomotives to provide proper traction, this line was equipped with an electric network. Unfortunately, after the Nagorno-Karabakh conflict between Azerbaijan and Armenia, this line is now partially closed and its capacity is used only for transporting local passenger trains. These locomotives are identified by numbers 651 to 658.

== See also ==
- Iranian locomotives
