= Mapna Locomotive Engineering and Manufacturing Company =

Rolling stock manufacturer

MLC (MAPNA Locomotive Engineering and Manufacturing Company)
- Company type: Private
- Industry: Locomotive Production
- Founded: 2006 in Tehran, Iran
- Founder: MAPNA Group
- Headquarters: Tehran and Karaj, Iran
- Key people: Hossein Ghomashi (CEO)
- Products: Locomotives (Diesel and Electric), Rail Vehicle Braking Systems
- Services: Maintenance & refurbishing of different types of locomotives
- Revenue: $ 30.2 million
- Number of employees: 400(2012)
- Website: www.mapnalocomotive.com

MAPNA Locomotive Engineering and Manufacturing Company (MLC) is an Iranian manufacturing company which was established in 2006. The company's manufacturing plant was officially inaugurated in 2012 with the objective of manufacturing 150 passenger locomotives in cooperation with Siemens, to be delivered to Iran's Railways Company (RAI).

== Products ==
The company has produced single-ended Eurorunner type locomotives (IranRunner).
