= IranRunner =

Iranian locomotive

ER24PC IranRunner
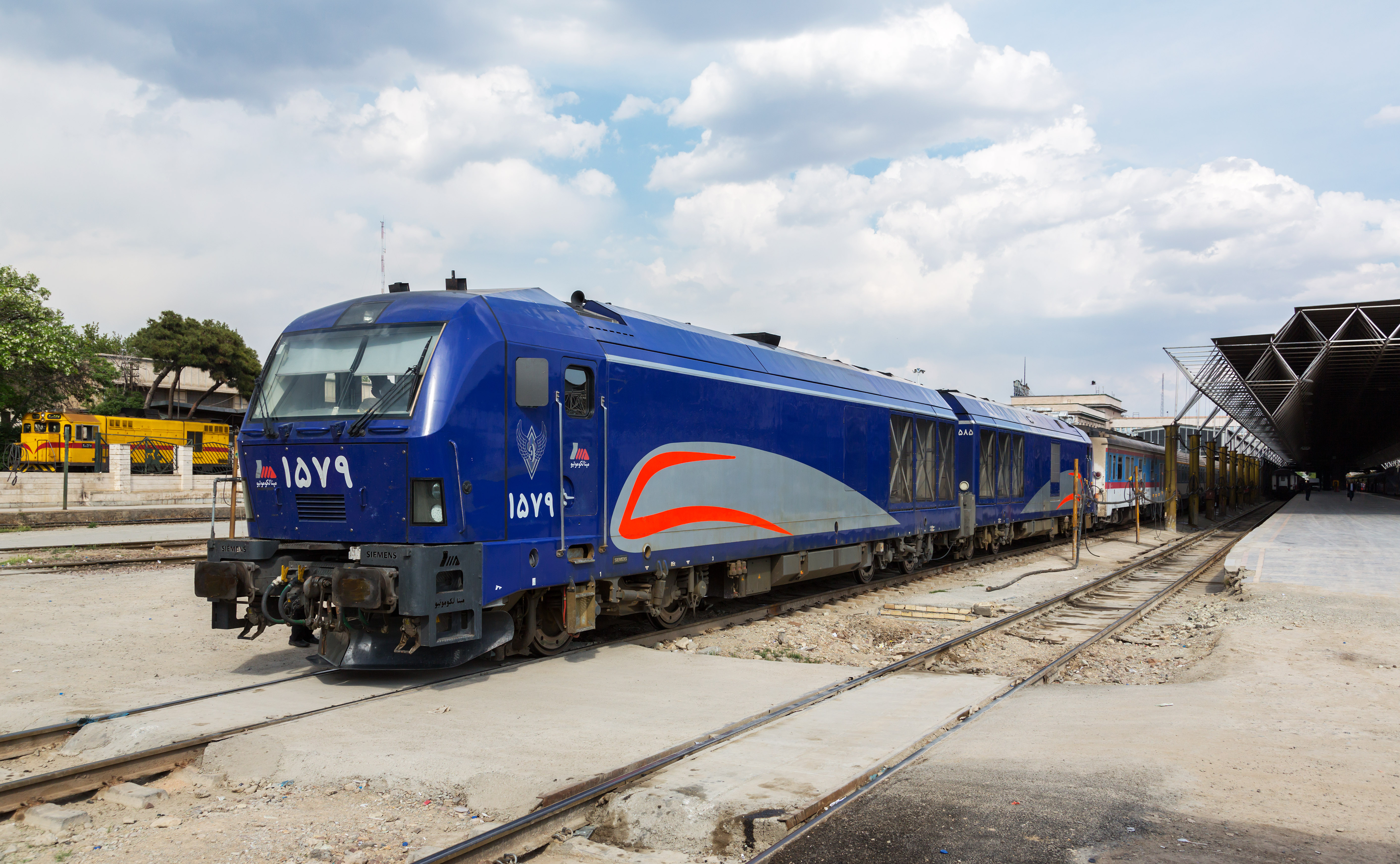
Type and origin
- Power type: diesel electric
- Build date: 2009-2013
- Total produced: 150
Specifications
- Configuration
  - UIC: Bo'Bo'
- Gauge: 1,435 mm (4 ft 8 1/2 in) standard gauge
- Length: 18,600 mm (61 ft 0 in)
- Width: 2,870 mm (9 ft 5 in)
- Height: 4,280 mm (14 ft 1 in)
- Loco weight: 85.5 t (94.2 tons)
- Prime mover: MTU 16V 4000 R43L
- Engine type: V16
- Cylinders: 16
Performance figures
- Maximum speed: 160 km/h (99 mph)
- Power output: 2,400 kW (3,200 hp)
- Tractive effort: 270 kN (61,000 lbf)
Career
- Operators: RAI
- Numbers: 1501–1650
- Sources: except where noted

The IranRunner, also known as the ER24PC and Iran Safir, is a class of single-cab diesel-electric passenger locomotives manufactured by the Mapna Locomotive Engineering and Manufacturing Company and Siemens for the Islamic Republic of Iran Railways.

== History ==
In 2006 the Islamic Republic of Iran Railways ordered 150 four axle Bo'Bo' 2.4 MW (3,200 hp) diesel locomotives for passenger trains from Siemens. The first 30 locomotives were manufactured by Siemens in Munich, Germany and the remaining 120 locomotives in Iran by Mapna under a technology transfer agreement. The value of the contract was €450 million.

The first locomotive was manufactured by Siemens in early 2009.

In 2015 a contract was signed for Siemens to supply components for Mapna to assemble another 50 IranRunner locomotives.

== Design ==
The locomotives are based on the Siemens EuroRunner, however unlike these the IranRunner has only one cab. The shape of the cab is similar to the Eurorunner ER20CF locomotives of Lithuanian Railways.

== Operations ==
The locomotives are maintained at a depot in Karaj.

Depot	Number	Quantity
Bandar Abbas	1577-1581, 1596-1600, 1602-1604	13
Isfahan	1571-1576	6
Kerman	1582-1586, 1601, 1605-1606	8
Mashhad	1591-1595	5
Shiraz	1610-1650	41
Tehran	1501-1570	70
Zahedan	1587-1590, 1607-1609	7

== See also ==
Iranian locomotives
