= Wagon Pars =

Rolling stock manufacturer

- Industry: Rail Transport
- Founded: 1974; 52 years ago
- Founder: IDRO Group
- Headquarters: Arak, Iran
- Area served: Worldwide
- Key people: Morteza Mollanejad (CEO)
- Products: Locomotives; Multiple unit trains; Freight trains; Passenger trains; Subway trains; Bogies
- Owner: MAPNA Group
- Number of employees: 900 (2020s)
- Website: www.mapnawagonpars.com

Wagon Pars (in Persian: شرکت واگن‌ پارس, Sherkat-e Vâgon Pars) is an Iranian train and locomotive manufacturer established in 1974, in Arak. Products include locomotives, trains, metros, freight and fuel railroad cars, and equipment for passenger boarding of aircraft. It is the largest rolling stock manufacturer in the Middle East.

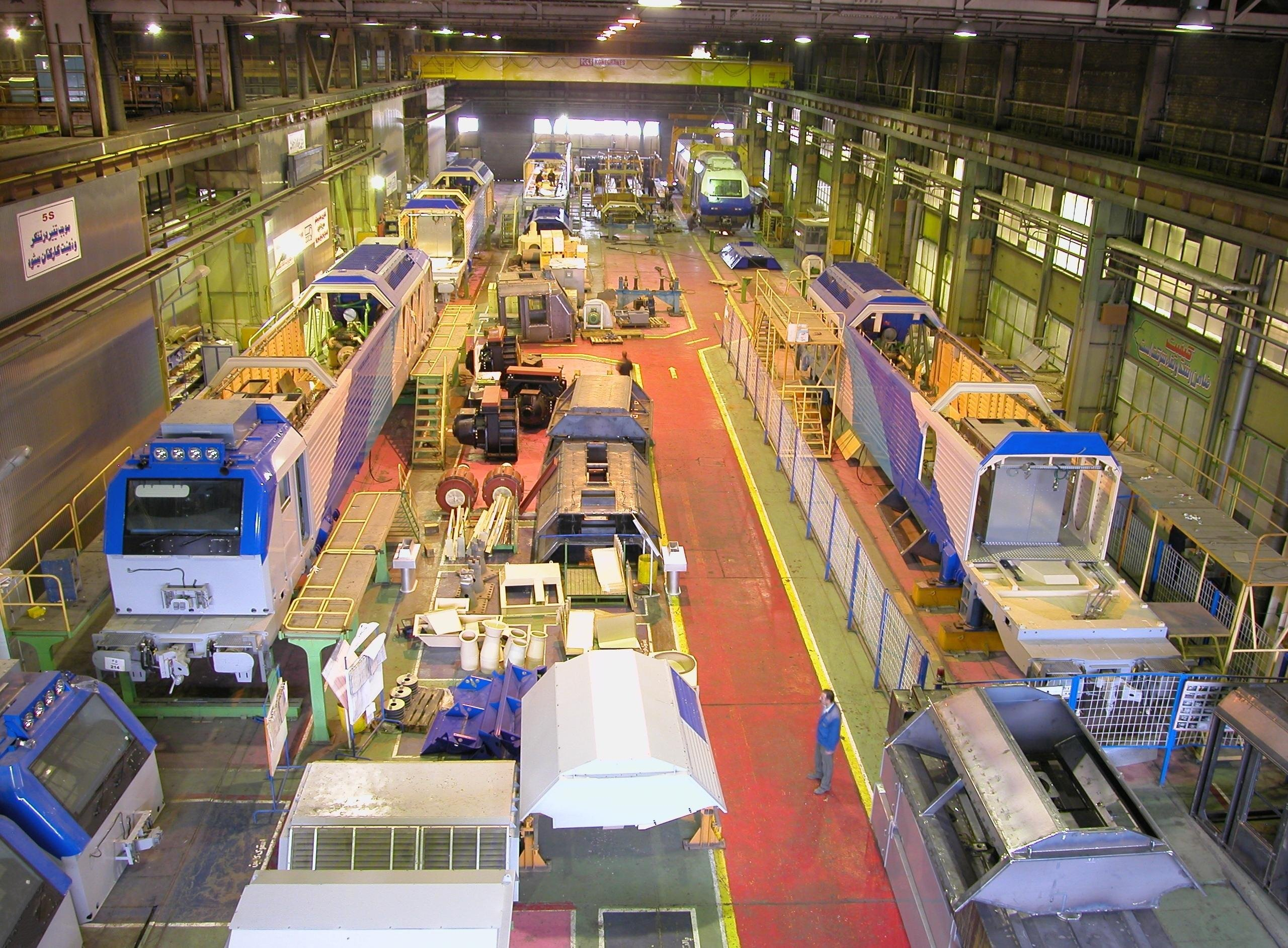
Iranian Railways AD43C locomotive production at Wagon Pars

== History ==
Wagon Pars began rolling stock manufacturing in 1984. In 1999, the factory reached an agreement with GEC-Alsthom to produce under license the Iranian Railways AD43C mainline locomotives.

In 2007 the company manufactured Iran's first express train: a four coach, 252 passenger, 160 km/h train. In 2009 the company had a production capacity of 1,800 vehicles per annum, and was operating at 20% of that figure.

In the first decade of the 21st century the company received export orders for Cuba, including a 60 billion rial order for 550 freight wagons, (completed Sept. 2009) and 200 passenger vehicles Also in 2009 the company obtained an €80 million contract with Vietnam Railways for the supply of 200 passenger vehicles - 40 of which would be produced by Wagon Pars, the remainder assembled in Vietnam as part of a technology transfer agreement.

In 2009 and 2010, workers at the Wagon Pars factory staged protests due to lack of payment of wages; the company is thought to be in financial difficulties due to mismanagement. The acquisition by Iran Khodro during the 2005-2010 privatization of Iranian industries is claimed to have contributed to the company's poor financial state.

In May 2010 the company announced it was going to help set up a rolling stock factory in Syria. The plant is to have a production capacity of 300 wagons, and also be able to repair passenger coaches.

In August 2018, the Iranian Ministry of Defense declared it had unloaded its shares in Wagon Pars. In 2019, the company broke its production record by building 411 cargo and passenger wagons in a year. The company said it had the capacity to make 150 passenger wagons and 1,000 cargo wagons per year.
