= Shariati Metro Station (Mashhad Metro) =

Mashhad Metro station

Coordinates: 36°17′27.81″N 59°35′9.53″E

Shariati Metro Station ایستگاه مترو شریعتی
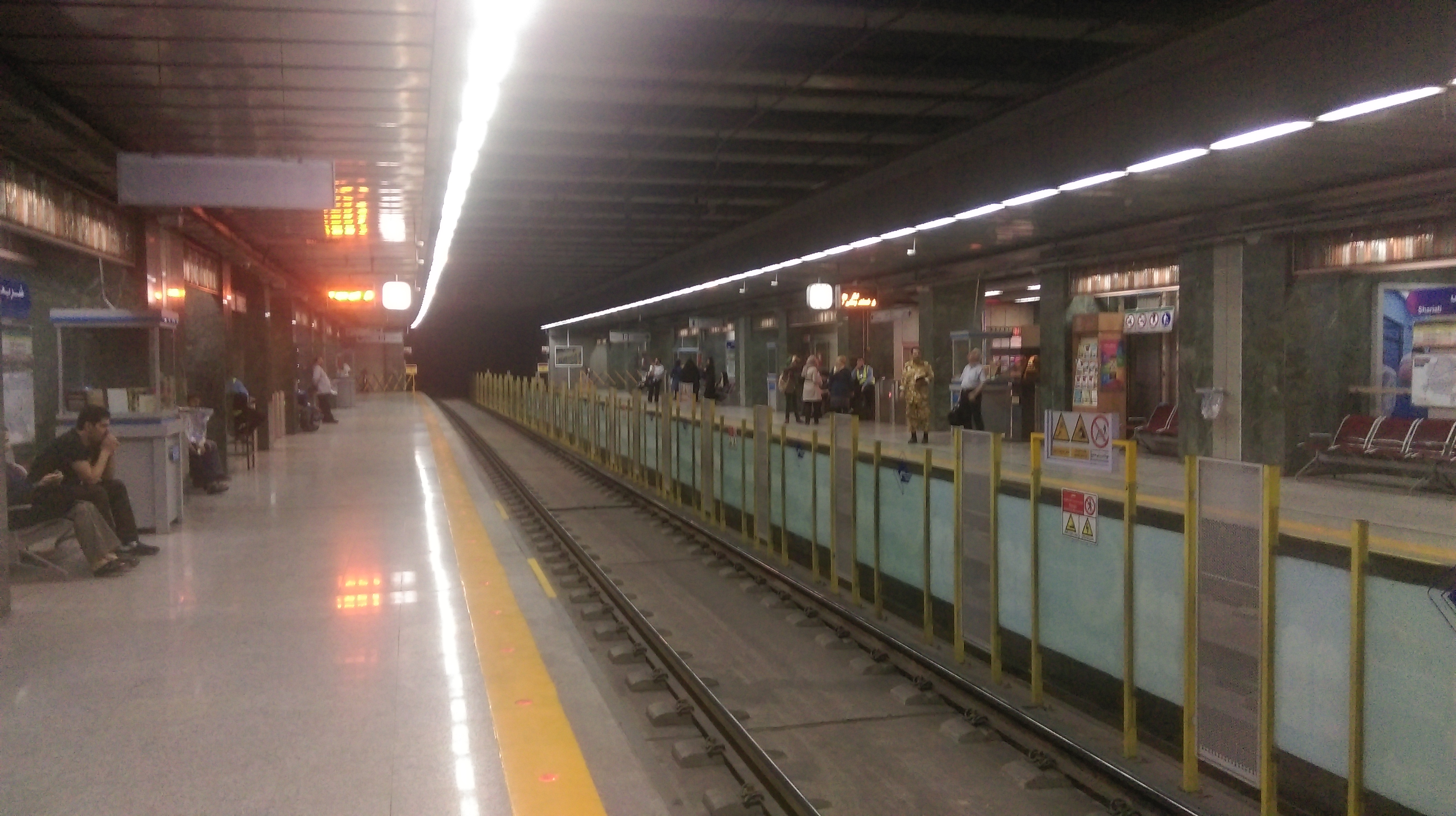

General information
- Location: Shari'ati Sq. Districts 1-8, Mashhad, Mashhad County; Iran
- System: Mashhad Metro Station
- Operator: Mashhad Urban Railway Operation Company(MUROC)
- Connections: Mashhad City Buses: 1 Ghadir-Vakil Abad (Express); 10 Ghadir-Vakil Abad; 15 Shariati-Elahieh; 22/2 Enqelab-Gardeshgari; 26 Shariati-Me'raj; 38 Khajeh Rabi-Zakaria; 38/1 Shohada-Azadi; 73 Felestin-Beyt-ol Moqaddas; 82 Beyt-ol Moqaddas-Zakaria; 86 Beyt-ol Moqaddas-Zakaria

History
- Opened: 18 Mehr 1390 H-Sh (10 October 2011) (Line 1); 29 Esfand 1396 H-Kh (20 March 2018) (Line 2)

Services
Preceding station	Mashhad Urban Railway	Following station
Ghaem towards Vakil Abad	Line 1	Imam Khomeini towards Hasheminejad Airport
Saadi towards Tabarsi	Line 2	Alandasht towards Shahid Kaveh
Location

Shariati Metro Station is a station of Mashhad Metro Line 1. The station opened on 10 October 2011. It is located on Shari'ati Sq.. The station provides access to Qa'em and Emam Reza hospitals. The station also serves Mashhad Metro Line 2 and provide interchange between the two lines from 20 March 2018. On 7 May 2018 Iranian President Hassan Rouhani took part in the inauguration ceremony of the first Mashhad Urban Railway interchange station "Shariati" which connects line 1 and 2.
