= Imam Khomeini Metro Station (Mashhad Metro) =

Mashhad Metro station

Coordinates: 36°16′52.46″N 59°35′44.79″E

Imam Khomeini Metro Station ایستگاه مترو امام خمینی

General information
- Location: Bahar Blvd. District 8, Mashhad, Mashhad County; Iran
- System: Mashhad Metro Station
- Operator: Mashhad Urban Railway Operation Company(MUROC)
- Connections: Mashhad City Buses: 1 Ghadir-Vakil Abad (Express); 2 Khajeh Rabi-Enqelab (Express); 10 Ghadir-Vakil Abad; 37 Mofatteh-Ghadir; 66 Mosalla-Enqelab; 82 Beyt-ol Moqaddas-Zakaria; 86 Beyt-ol Moqaddas-Zakaria

History
- Opened: 18 Mehr 1390 H-Kh (10 October 2011)

Services
Preceding station	Mashhad Urban Railway	Following station
Shariati towards Vakil Abad	Line 1	Basij towards Hasheminejad Airport
Location

Imam Khomeini Metro Station is a station of Mashhad Metro Line 1. The station opened on 10 October 2011. It is located on Bahar Blvd.
