= Park-e-Mellat Metro Station (Mashhad Metro) =

Mashhad Metro station

Coordinates: 36°19′2.27″N 59°32′1.85″E

Park-e-Mellat Metro Station ایستگاه مترو پارک ملت
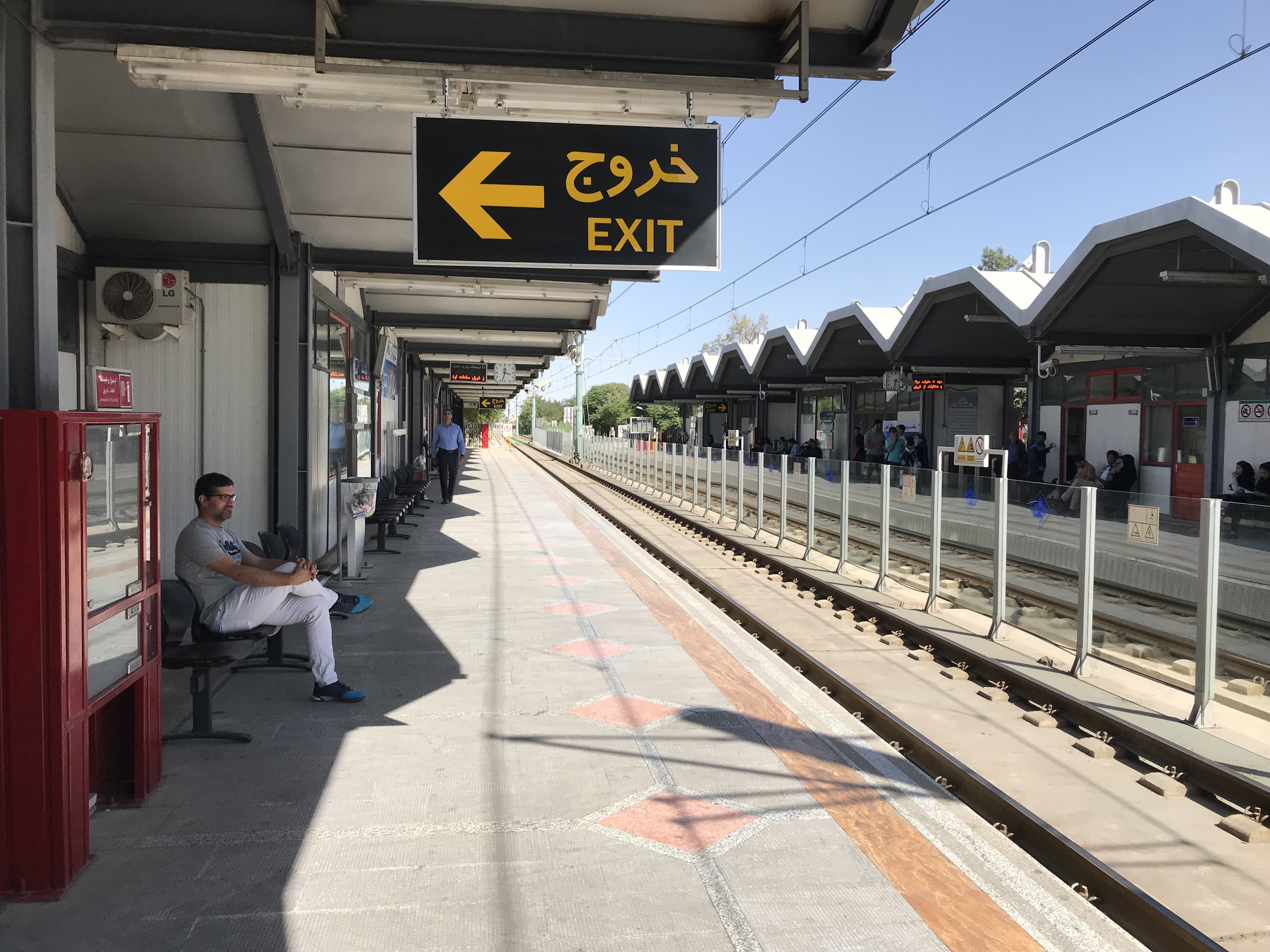

General information
- Location: Vakilabad Expressway; Districts 9-11, Mashhad, Mashhad County; Iran
- System: Mashhad Metro Station
- Operator: Mashhad Urban Railway Operation Company(MUROC)
- Connections: Azadi Bus Terminal Mashhad City Buses: 1 Ghadir-Vakil Abad (Express); 10 Ghadir-Vakil Abad; 11 Vakil Abad-Ferdowsi; 14, 14/1 Elahieh-Azadi; 15/1 Elahieh-Azadi; 16/1 Elahieh-Hejab-Azadi; 17, 17/1 Elahieh-Shahrak Razi-Azadi; 18, 18/1 Elahieh-Azadi; 19 Azadi-Shahed; 20 Elahieh-Azadi; 25 Mosalla-Azadi; 31 Elahieh-Andisheh-Azadi; 38/1 Shohada-Azadi; 62 Beyt-ol Moqaddas-Azadi; 88 Khajeh Rabi-Azadi; 88 Khajeh Rabi-Azadi; 94 Azadi-Kuy-e Ab o Barq; 94/1 Azadi-Piruzi-Vakil Abad; 96 Azadi-Shahrak Niru Havaei; 97 Azadi-Kowsar-Hashemieh; 98/1 Azadi-Sarafrazan; 100 Mosalla-Azadi

History
- Opened: 18 Mehr 1390 H-Kh (10 October 2011)

Services
Preceding station	Mashhad Urban Railway	Following station
Kowsar towards Vakil Abad	Line 1	Azadi towards Hasheminejad Airport
Location

Park-e-Mellat Metro Station is a station of Mashhad Metro Line 1. The station opened on 10 October 2011. It is located on Vakilabad Expressway. The station provides access to Ferdowsi University of Mashhad.
