= Sayyad-e-Shirazi Metro Station (Mashhad Metro) =

Mashhad Metro station

Coordinates: 36°19′56.95″N 59°29′6.5″E

Sayyad-e Shirazi Metro Station ایستگاه مترو صیاد شیرازی
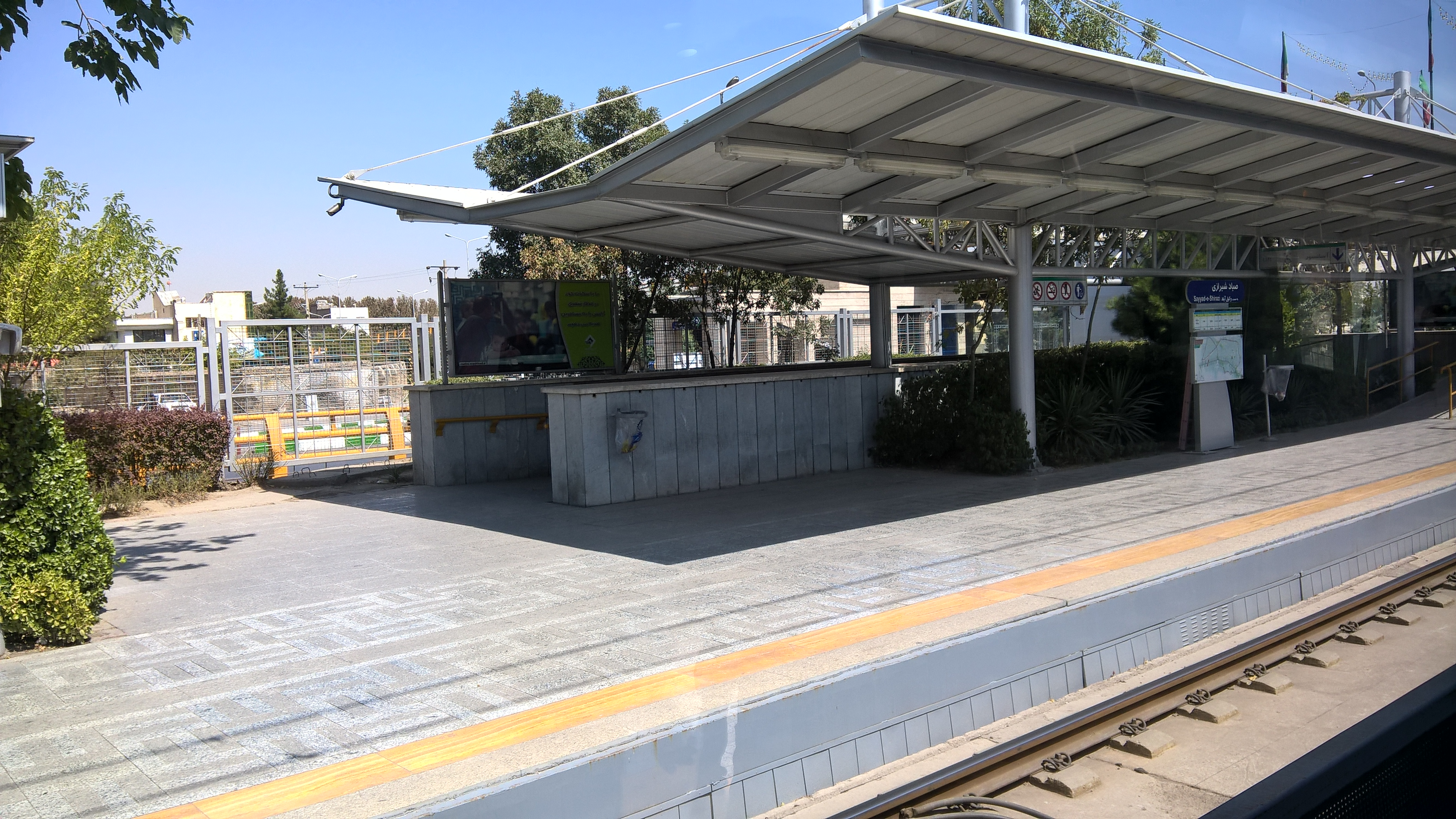

General information
- Location: Vakilabad Expressway; Districts 9-11, Mashhad, Mashhad County; Iran
- System: Mashhad Metro Station
- Operator: Mashhad Urban Railway Operation Company(MUROC)
- Connections: Mashhad City Buses: 1 Ghadir-Vakil Abad (Express); 10 Ghadir-Vakil Abad; 11 Vakil Abad-Ferdowsi; 12 Vakil Abad-Haram-e Motahhar; 14 Elahieh-Azadi; 18, 18/1 Elahieh-Azadi

History
- Opened: 18 Mehr 1390 H-Kh (10 October 2011)

Services
Preceding station	Mashhad Urban Railway	Following station
Iqbal towards Vakil Abad	Line 1	Sadaf towards Hasheminejad Airport
Location

Sayyad-e Shirazi Metro Station is a station of Mashhad Metro Line 1. The station opened on 10 October 2011. It is located on Vakilabad Expressway.

It is named after the assassinated Ali Sayad Shirazi, chief-of-staff of the Iranian Armed Forces during the eight-year Iran–Iraq war.
