= Danesh Amuz Metro Station (Mashhad Metro) =

Mashhad Metro station

Coordinates: 36°19′29.67″N 59°30′33.75″E

Danesh Amuz Metro Station ایستگاه مترو دانش آموز

General information
- Location: Vakilabad Expressway; Districts 9-11, Mashhad, Mashhad County; Iran
- System: Mashhad Metro Station
- Operator: Mashhad Urban Railway Operation Company(MUROC)
- Connections: Mashhad City Buses: 10 Ghadir-Vakil Abad; 11 Vakil Abad-Ferdowsi; 12 Vakil Abad-Haram-e Motahhar; 14 Elahieh-Azadi; 18, 18/1 Elahieh-Azadi; 94 Azadi-Kuy-e Ab o Barq; 96 Azadi-Shahrak Niru Havaei

History
- Opened: 18 Mehr 1390 H-Sh (10 October 2011)

Services
| Preceding station | Mashhad Urban Railway | Following station |
|---|---|---|
| Haft-e-Tir towards Vakil Abad | Line 1 | Seyed Razi towards Hasheminejad Airport |
Location

Danesh Amuz Metro Station is a station of Mashhad Metro Line 1. The station opened on 10 October 2011. It is located on Vakilabad Expressway.
