= Shohada Metro Station (Mashhad Metro) =

Metro station in Mashhad, Iran

Coordinates: 36°17′52.3″N 59°36′21.41″E

Shohada Metro Station ایستگاه مترو شهدا

General information
- Location: Shohada square Districts 1-2-3-8, Mashhad, Mashhad County; Iran
- System: Mashhad Metro Station
- Operator: Mashhad Urban Railway Operation Company(MUROC)
- Connections: Mashhad City Buses

History
- Opened: 27 Bahman 1395 H-Kh (15 February 2017)

Services
Preceding station	Mashhad Urban Railway	Following station
Raah Ahan towards Tabarsi	Line 2	Saadi towards Shahid Kaveh
Location

Shohada Metro Station is a station of Mashhad Metro Line 2. The station opened on 15 February 2017. It is located at Shohada square in downtown Mashhad.
