= Hefdah-e-Shahrivar Metro Station (Mashhad Metro) =

Mashhad Metro station

Coordinates: 36°16′3.8″N 59°36′32.9″E

Hefdah-e-Shahrivar Metro Station ایستگاه مترو هفده شهریور

General information
- Location: Fada'ian-e Eslam Blvd. District 7, Mashhad, Mashhad County; Iran
- System: Mashhad Metro Station
- Operator: Mashhad Urban Railway Operation Company(MUROC)
- Connections: Mashhad City Buses: 1 Ghadir-Vakil Abad (Express); 10 Ghadir-Vakil Abad

History
- Opened: 18 Mehr 1390 H-Kh (10 October 2011)

Services
Preceding station	Mashhad Urban Railway	Following station
Basij towards Vakil Abad	Line 1	Parvin-e-Etessami towards Hasheminejad Airport
Location

Hefdah-e-Shahrivar Metro Station is a station of Mashhad Metro Line 1. The station opened on 10 October 2011. It is located on Fada'ian-e Eslam Blvd.
