= Iqbal Metro Station (Mashhad Metro) =

Mashhad Metro station

Iqbal Metro Station ایستگاه مترو اقبال
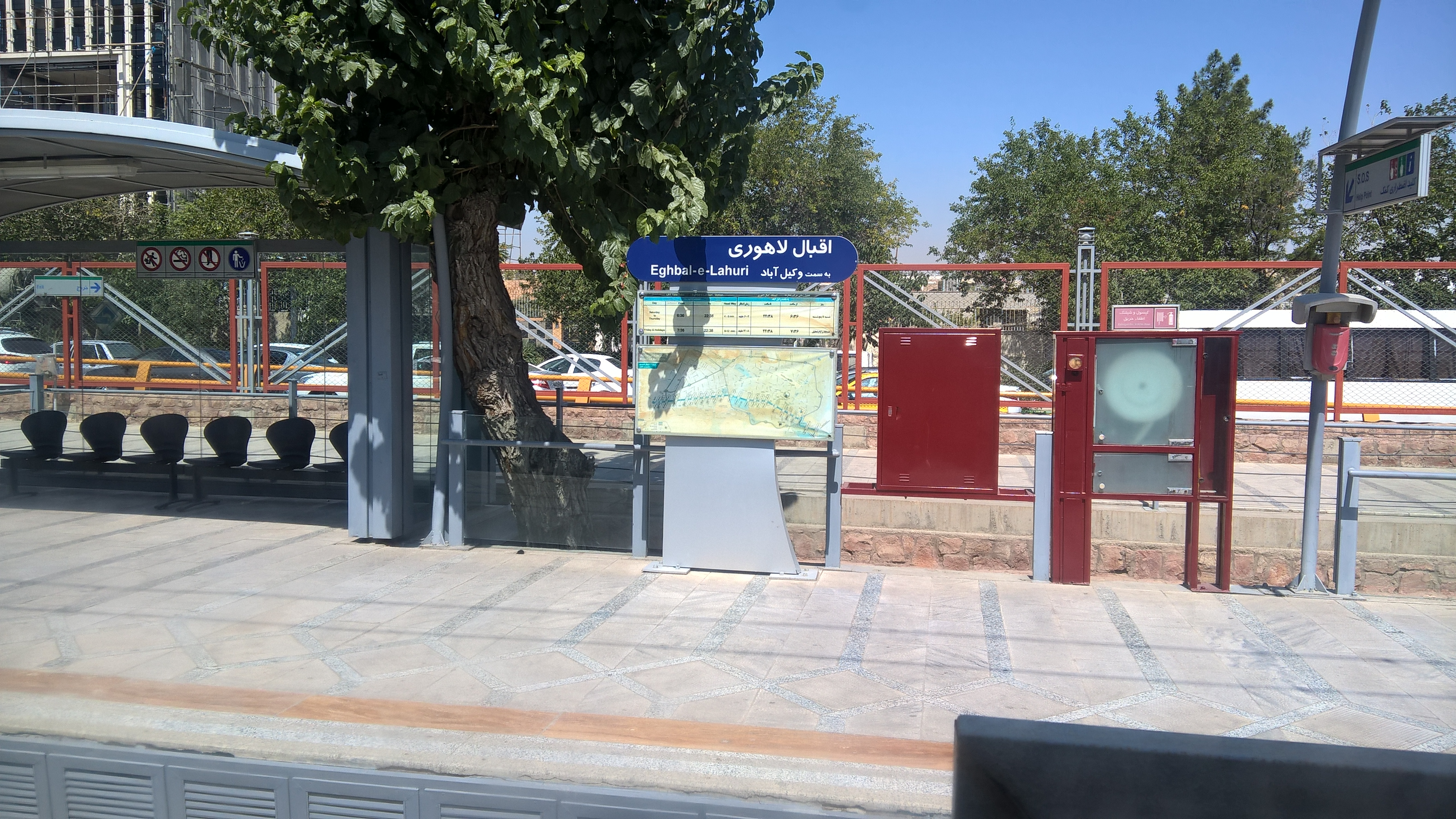

General information
- Location: Vakilabad Expressway; Districts 9-11, Mashhad, Mashhad County; Iran
- Coordinates: 36.3359°N 59.4743°E
- System: Mashhad Metro Station
- Operator: Mashhad Urban Railway Operation Company(MUROC)
- Connections: Mashhad City Buses: 1 Ghadir-Vakil Abad (Express); 10 Ghadir-Vakil Abad; 11 Vakil Abad-Ferdowsi; 12 Vakil Abad-Haram-e Motahhar

History
- Opened: 18 Mehr 1390 H-Sh (10 October 2011)

Services
Preceding station	Mashhad Urban Railway	Following station
Int. Exposition towards Vakil Abad	Line 1	Sayyad-e-shirazi towards Hasheminejad Airport
Location

Iqbal Metro Station (Persian: ایستگاه مترو اقبال) is a station of Mashhad Metro Line 1. It is located on Vakilabad Expressway. The station was opened on 10 October 2011 and is named after Islamic philosopher and poet Muhammad Iqbal.
