= Taleghani Metro Station (Mashhad Metro) =

Metro station in Mashhad, Iran

Coordinates: 36°17′49.24″N 59°34′23.45″E

Taleghani Metro Station ایستگاه مترو طالقانی

General information
- Location: Ahmadabad Blvd. District 1, Mashhad, Mashhad County; Iran
- System: Mashhad Metro Station
- Operator: Mashhad Urban Railway Operation Company(MUROC)
- Connections: Mashhad City Buses: 10 Ghadir-Vakil Abad; 15 Shariati-Elahieh; 22/2 Enqelab-Gardeshgari; 26 Shariati-Me'raj; 38/1 Shohada-Azadi; 73 Felestin-Beyt-ol Moqaddas

History
- Opened: 18 Mehr 1390 H-kh (10 October 2011)

Services
Preceding station	Mashhad Urban Railway	Following station
Palestine towards Vakil Abad	Line 1	Ghaem towards Hasheminejad Airport
Location

Taleghani Metro Station is a station of Mashhad Metro Line 1. The station opened on 10 October 2011. It is located on Ahmadabad Blvd.
