= Sadaf Metro Station (Mashhad Metro) =

Mashhad Metro station

Coordinates: 36°19′47.5″N 59°29′36.67″E

Sadaf Metro Station ایستگاه مترو صدف

General information
- Location: Vakilabad Expressway; Districts 9-11, Mashhad, Mashhad County; Iran
- System: Mashhad Metro Station
- Operator: Mashhad Urban Railway Operation Company(MUROC)
- Connections: Mashhad City Buses: 10 Ghadir-Vakil Abad; 11 Vakil Abad-Ferdowsi; 12 Vakil Abad-Haram-e Motahhar; 14 Elahieh--Azadi; 18, 18/1 Elahieh-Azadi

History
- Opened: 18 Mehr 1390 H-Kh (10 October 2011)

Services
Preceding station	Mashhad Urban Railway	Following station
Sayyad-e-shirazi towards Vakil Abad	Line 1	Haft-e-Tir towards Hasheminejad Airport
Location

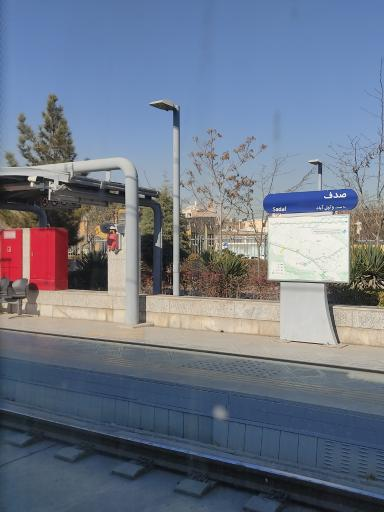
Sadaf Station, Line 1, Mashhad

Sadaf Metro Station is a station of Mashhad Metro Line 1. The station opened on 10 October 2011. It is located on Vakilabad Expressway.
