= Parvin-e-Etessami Metro Station =

Mashhad Metro station

Coordinates: 36°15′44.89″N 59°36′51.68″E

Parvin-e-Etessami Metro Station ایستگاه مترو پروین اعتصامی

General information
- Location: Fada'ian-e Eslam Blvd. District 7, Mashhad, Mashhad County; Iran
- System: Mashhad Metro Station
- Operator: Mashhad Urban Railway Operation Company(MUROC)
- Connections: Mashhad City Buses: 10 Ghadir-Vakil Abad

History
- Opened: 18 Mehr 1390 H-Kh (10 October 2011)

Services
Preceding station	Mashhad Urban Railway	Following station
Hefdah-e-Shahrivar towards Vakil Abad	Line 1	Ghadir towards Hasheminejad Airport
Location

Parvin-e-Etessami Metro Station is a station of Mashhad Metro Line 1. The station opened on 10 October 2011. It is located on Fada'ian-e Eslam Blvd.
