= Seyed Razi Metro Station (Mashhad Metro) =

Mashhad Metro station

Coordinates: 36°19′21.3″N 59°31′0.91″E

Seyed Razi Metro Station ایستگاه مترو سید رضی

General information
- Location: Vakilabad Expressway; Districts 9-11, Mashhad, Mashhad County; Iran
- System: Mashhad Metro Station
- Operator: Mashhad Urban Railway Operation Company(MUROC)
- Connections: Mashhad City Buses: 10 Ghadir-Vakil Abad; 11 Vakil Abad-Ferdowsi; 14 Elahieh-Azadi; 15/1 Elahieh-Azadi; 16/1 Elahieh-Hejab-Azadi; 18, 18/1 Elahieh-Azadi; 94 Azadi-Kuy-e Ab o Barq; 94/1 Azadi-Piruzi-Vakil Abad; 96 Azadi-Shahrak Niru Havaei; 98/1 Azadi-Sarafrazan

History
- Opened: 18 Mehr 1390 H-Kh (10 October 2011)

Services
Preceding station	Mashhad Urban Railway	Following station
Danesh Amuz towards Vakil Abad	Line 1	Kowsar towards Hasheminejad Airport
Location

Seyed Razi Metro Station is a station of Mashhad Metro Line 1. The station opened on 10 October 2011. It is located on Vakilabad Expressway.
