= Basij Metro Station (Mashhad Metro) =

Urban rail station in Mashhad, Iran

Coordinates: 36°16′24.83″N 59°36′12.42″E

Basij Metro Station ایستگاه مترو بسیج
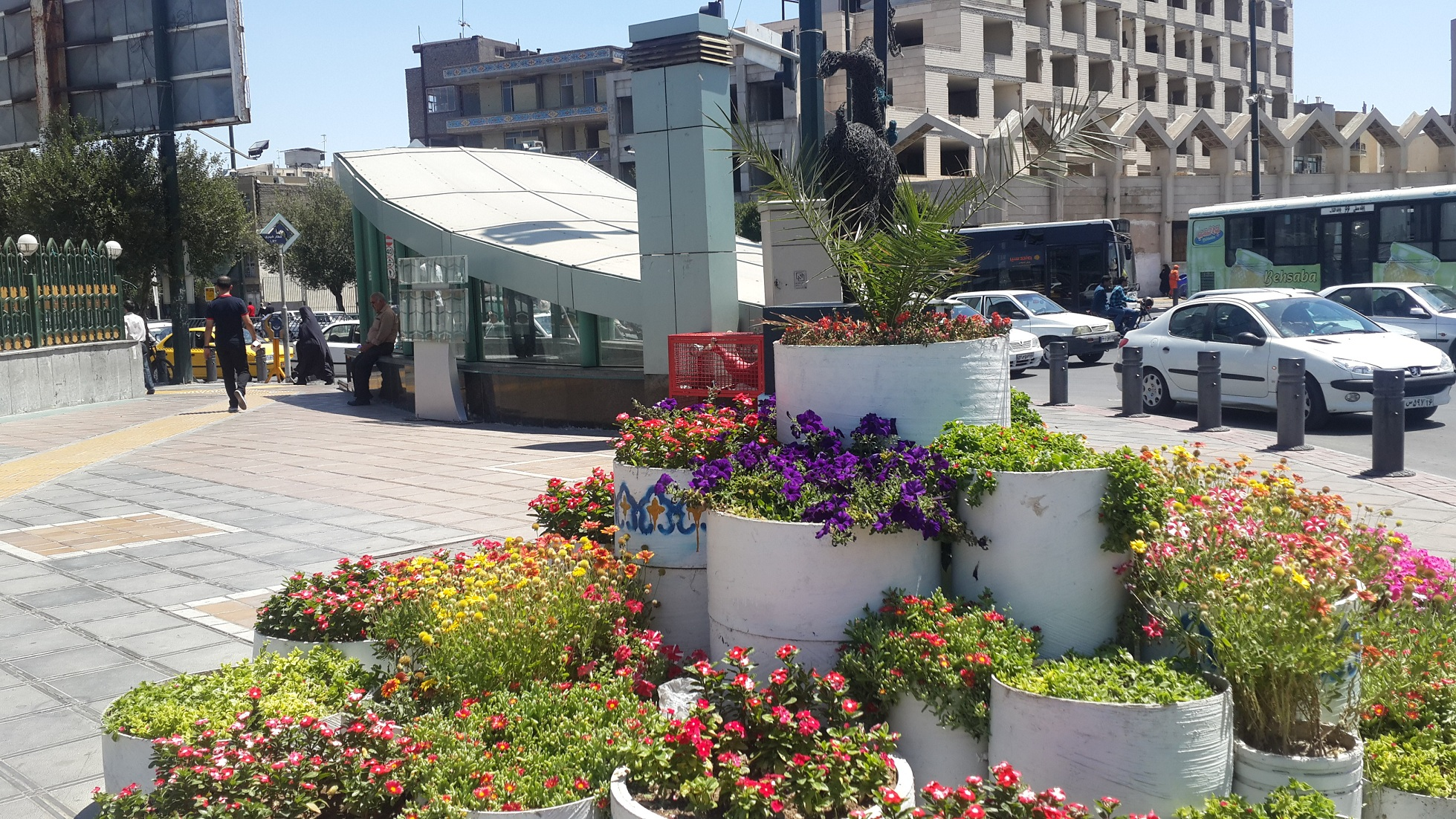

General information
- Location: Basij Square; Districts 7-8, Mashhad, Mashhad County; Iran
- System: Mashhad Metro Station
- Operator: Mashhad Urban Railway Operation Company(MUROC)
- Connections: Mashhad City Buses: BRT 1 Emam Reza Terminal-Holy Shrine-Tabrasi; 1 Ghadir-Vakil Abad (Express); 10 Ghadir-Vakil Abad; 63 Basij-Shahrak Hasheminejad; 71/1 Enqelab-Saba; 72 Mosalla-Basij; 74 Enqelab-Saba; 75 Enqelab-Saba; 76 Enqelab-Butan; 78 Enqelab-Asgarieh; 84 Emam Reza Terminal-Tabrasi; 701, 701/1 Enqelab-Toroq; 702 Enqelab-Behesht-e Reza

History
- Opened: 18 Mehr 1390 H-Sh (10 October 2011)

Services
Preceding station	Mashhad Urban Railway	Following station
Imam Khomeini towards Vakil Abad	Line 1	Hefdah-e-Shahrivar towards Hasheminejad Airport
Location

Basij Metro Station is an urban rail station of the Mashhad Metro, Line 1, opened on 10 October 2011 and located on Basij Square. The station is also planned to serve Line 3 of the Mashhad Metro and provide an interchange between the two lines once construction of the second line is completed. The station has a connection to the BRT line, providing access to the Mashhad Passenger Terminal and Imam Reza shrine.
