= Kowsar Metro Station (Mashhad Metro) =

Mashhad Metro station

Coordinates: 36°19′12.04″N 59°31′30.34″E

Kowsar Metro Station ایستگاه مترو کوثر
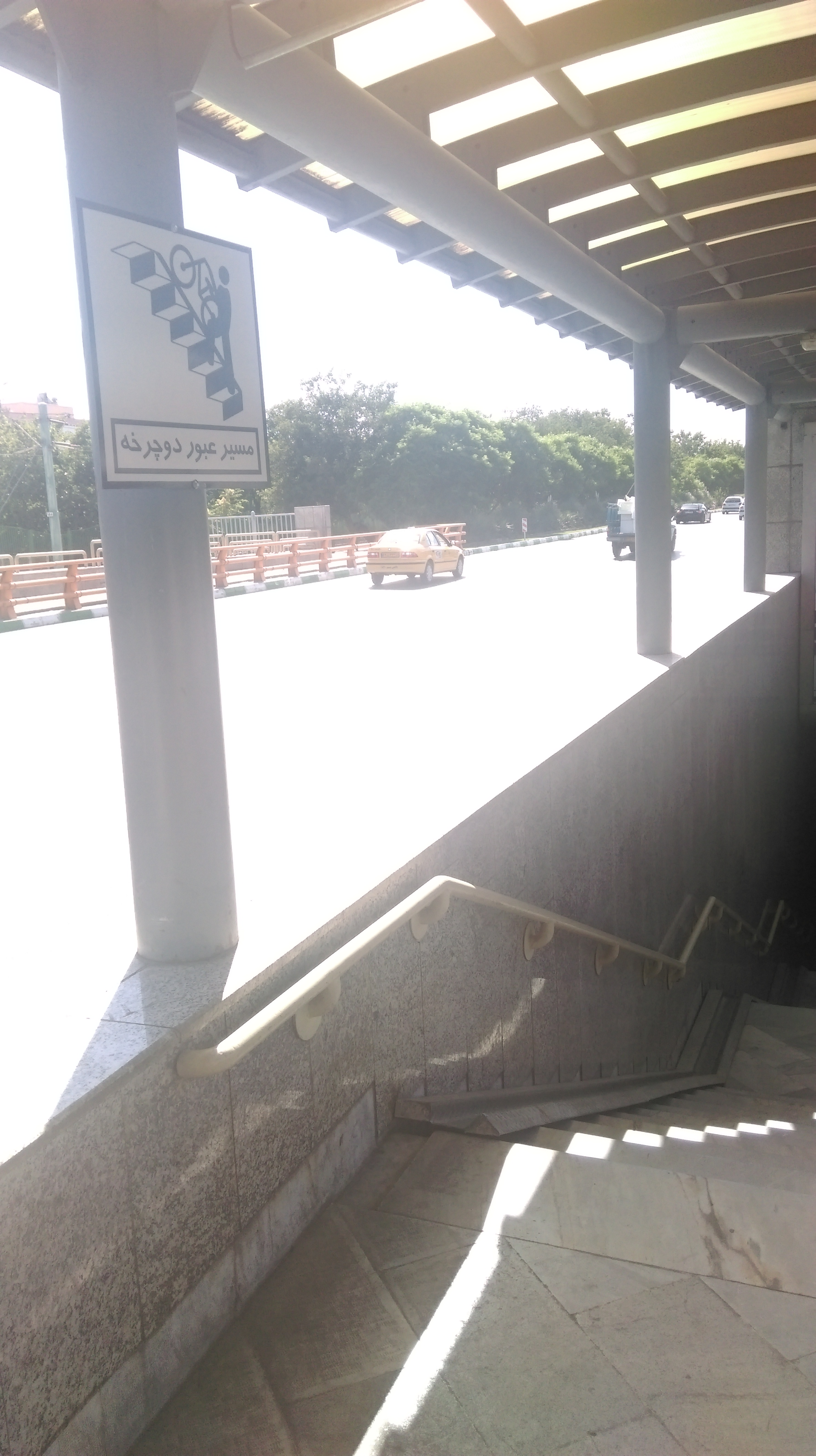

General information
- Location: Vakilabad Expressway; Districts 9-11, Mashhad, Mashhad County; Iran
- System: Mashhad Metro Station
- Operator: Mashhad Urban Railway Operation Company(MUROC)
- Connections: Mashhad City Buses: 10 Ghadir-Vakil Abad; 11 Vakil Abad-Ferdowsi; 14 Elahieh-Azadi; 15/1 Elahieh-Azadi; 16/1 Elahieh-Hejab-Azadi; 17 Elahieh-Shahrak Razi-Azadi; 18, 18/1 Elahieh-Azadi; 94 Azadi-Kuy-e Ab o Barq; 94/1 Azadi-Piruzi-Vakil Abad; 96 Azadi-Shahrak Niru Havaei; 97 Azadi-Kowsar-Hashemieh; 98/1 Azadi-Sarafrazan

History
- Opened: 18 Mehr 1390 H-Kh (10 October 2011)

Services
| Preceding station | Mashhad Urban Railway | Following station |
|---|---|---|
| Seyed Razi towards Vakil Abad | Line 1 | Park-e-Mellat towards Hasheminejad Airport |
Location

Seyyed Razi Metro Station is a station of Mashhad Metro Line 1. The station opened on 10 October 2011. It is located on Vakilabad Expressway. The station provides access to Farabi Hospital.
