= Velayat Metro Station (Mashhad Metro) =

Metro station in Mashhad, Iran

Coordinates: 36°19′1.01″N 59°39′43.98″E

Velayat Metro Station ایستگاه مترو ولایت

General information
- Location: North Tabarsi Boulevard; Districts 3-4, Mashhad, Mashhad County; Iran
- System: Mashhad Metro Station
- Operator: Mashhad Urban Railway Operation Company(MUROC)

History
- Opened: 27 Bahman 1395 H-Kh (15 February 2017)

Services
Preceding station	Mashhad Urban Railway	Following station
Tabarsi Terminus	Line 2	Fajr towards Shahid Kaveh
Location

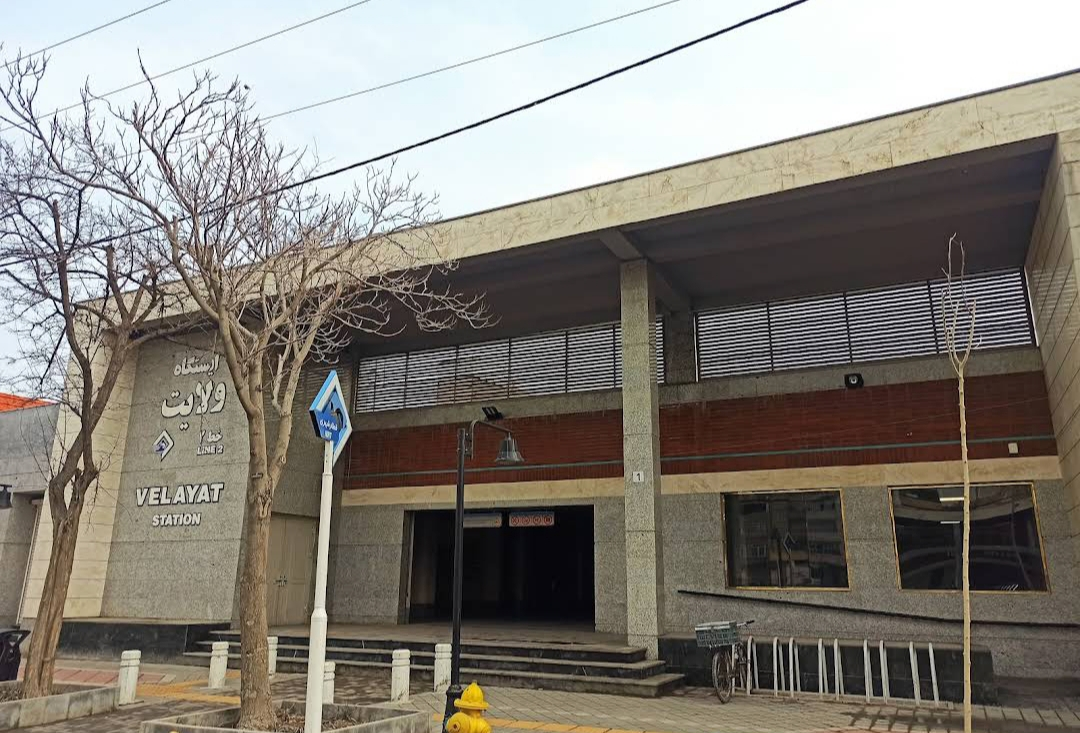
Velayat Metro Station, Line 2, Mashhad Metro

Velayat Metro Station is a station of Mashhad Metro Line 2. The station opened on 15 February 2017 and was named Tabarsi but later on the city council decided to replace the names of station 1 and 2 of line 2. It is located on North Tabarsi Boulevard.
