= Int. Exposition Metro Station (Mashhad Metro) =

Mashhad Metro station

Coordinates: 36°20′21.23″N 59°27′48.92″E

Int. Exposition Metro Station ایستگاه مترو نمایشگاه

General information
- Location: Vakilabad Expressway; Districts 9-11, Mashhad, Mashhad County; Iran
- System: Mashhad Metro Station
- Operator: Mashhad Urban Railway Operation Company(MUROC)
- Connections: Mashhad City Buses: 10 Ghadir-Vakil Abad; 11 Vakil Abad-Ferdowsi; 12, 12/1 Vakil Abad-Haram-e Motahhar; 90 Vakil Abad-Enqelab; 91 Felestin-Shahrak Shariati-Vakil Abad; 94/1 Azadi-Piruzi-Vakil Abad; 99 Khajeh Rabi-Vakil Abad

History
- Opened: 18 Mehr 1390 H-kh (10 October 2011)

Services
Preceding station	Mashhad Urban Railway	Following station
Kuhestan Park towards Vakil Abad	Line 1	Iqbal towards Hasheminejad Airport
Location

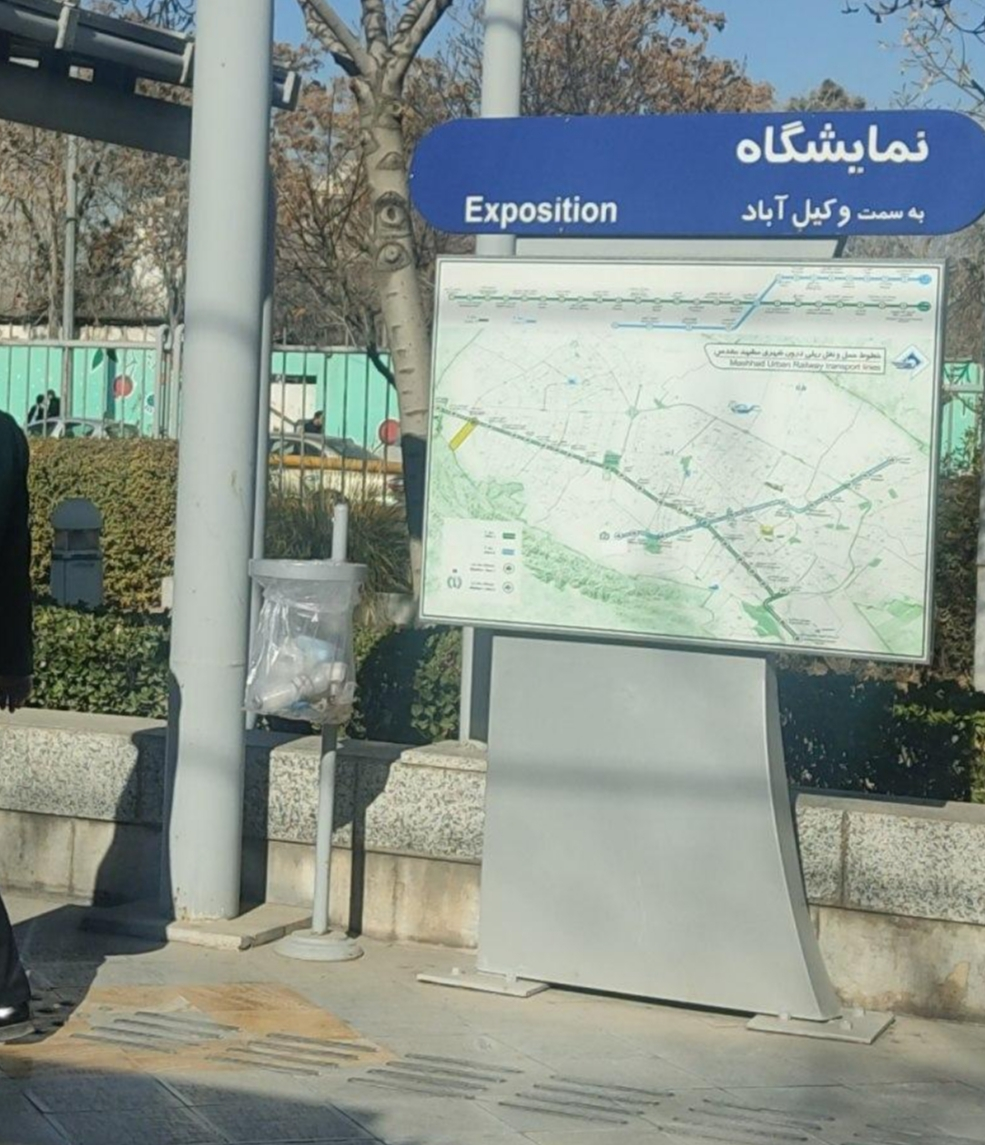
International Exposition Metro Station

International Exposition Metro Station (Persian: نمایشگاه-Namayeshgah) is a station of Mashhad Metro Line 1. The station opened on 10 October 2011. It is located on Vakilabad Expressway.
