= Nabovvat Metro Station (Mashhad Metro) =

Metro station in Mashhad, Iran

Nabovvat Metro Station ایستگاه مترو نبوت
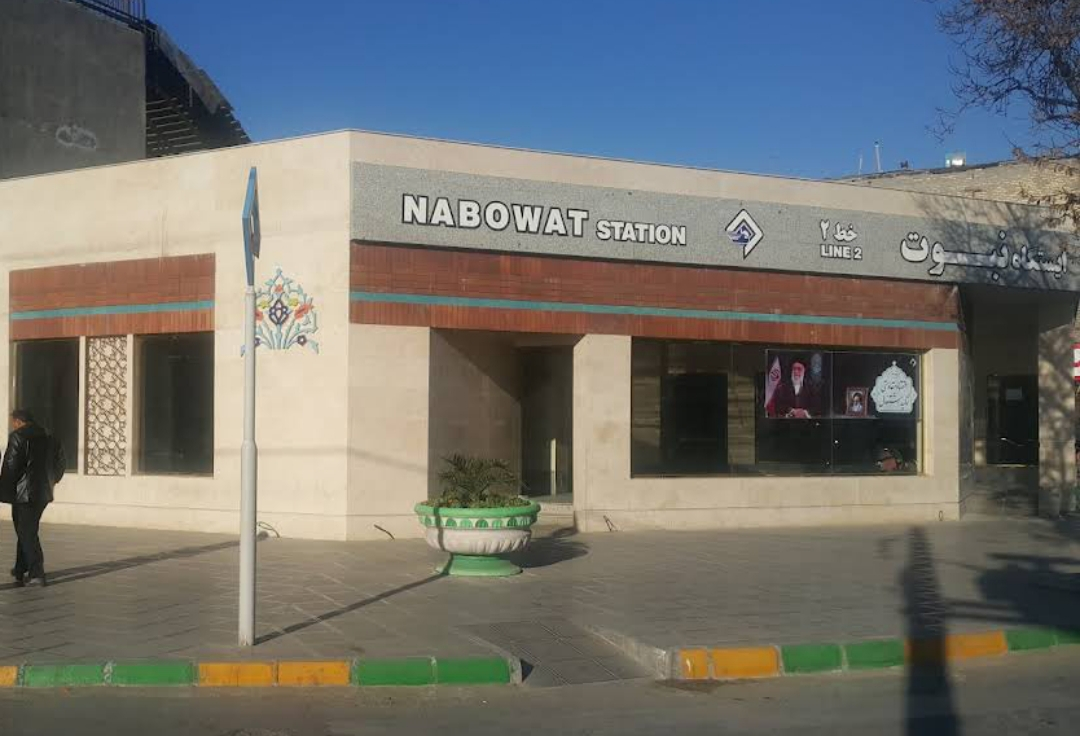

General information
- Location: Tabarsi Boulevard; Districts 3-4, Mashhad, Mashhad County; Iran
- Coordinates: 36°18′20.48″N 59°38′38.84″E
- System: Mashhad Metro Station
- Operator: Mashhad Urban Railway Operation Company(MUROC)

History
- Opened: 27 Bahman 1395 H-Kh (15 February 2017)

Services
Preceding station	Mashhad Urban Railway	Following station
Fajr towards Tabarsi	Line 2	Mofateh towards Shahid Kaveh
Location

Nabovvat Metro Station is a station of Mashhad Metro Line 2. The station opened on 15 February 2017. It is located on Tabarsi Boulevard at the intersection with Nobovvat and Gaz Streets.
