= Palestine Metro Station (Mashhad Metro) =

Mashhad Metro station

Coordinates: 36°18′0.61″N 59°33′47.96″E

Palestine Metro Station ایستگاه مترو فلسطین

General information
- Location: Felestin Sq. Districts 1-9, Mashhad, Mashhad County; Iran
- System: Mashhad Metro Station
- Operator: Mashhad Urban Railway Operation Company(MUROC)
- Connections: Mashhad City Buses: 1 Ghadir-Vakil Abad (Express); 10 Ghadir-Vakil Abad; 28/1 Mosalla-Felestin; 29 Felestin-Rahahan (Train Stn.); 37/1 Mofatteh-Felestin; 38/1 Shohada-Azadi; 73 Felestin-Beyt-ol Moqaddas; 91 Felestin-Shahrak Vali Asr-Vakil Abad; 92 Shariati-Nofel Loshato; 93 Felestin-Taleghani; 95 Felestin-Kuy Emam Reza-Sarafrazan; 96/1 Felestin-Shahrak Niru Havaei; 98 Felestin-Shahrak Lavizan-Sarafrazan

History
- Opened: 18 Mehr 1390 H-Kh (10 October 2011)

Services
Preceding station	Mashhad Urban Railway	Following station
Khayyam towards Vakil Abad	Line 1	Taleghani towards Hasheminejad Airport
Location

Palestine Metro Station is a station of Mashhad Metro Line 1. The station opened on 10 October 2011. It is located on Felestin Sq. Literary people call it Felestin in Persian, and this place is considered as one of the best locations in town in terms of quality of life and services. The station is of high importance for its location.
