= Haft-e-Tir Metro Station (Mashhad Metro) =

Mashhad Metro station

Coordinates: 36°19′40.12″N 59°30′0.86″E

Haft-e-Tir Station ایستگاه مترو هفت تیر
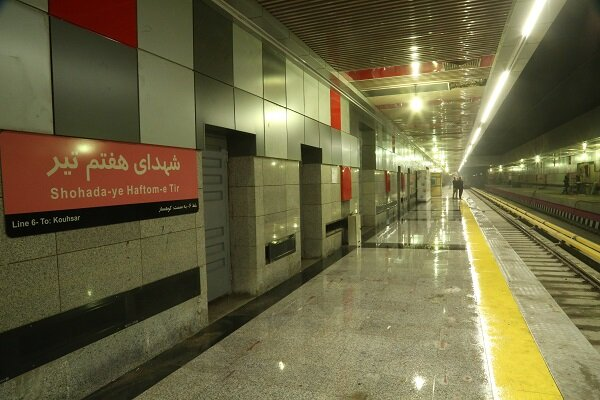

General information
- Location: Vakilabad Expressway; Districts 9-11, Mashhad, Mashhad County; Iran
- System: Mashhad Metro Station
- Operator: Mashhad Urban Railway Operation Company(MUROC)
- Connections: Mashhad City Buses: 1 Ghadir-Vakil Abad (Express); 10 Ghadir-Vakil Abad; 11 Vakil Abad-Ferdowsi; 12 Vakil Abad-Haram-e Motahhar; 14 Elahieh-Azadi; 18, 18/1 Elahieh-Azadi; 94 Azadi-Kuy-e Ab o Barq

History
- Opened: 18 Mehr 1390 H-Sh (10 October 2011)

Services
Preceding station	Mashhad Urban Railway	Following station
Sadaf towards Vakil Abad	Line 1	Danesh Amuz towards Hasheminejad Airport
Location

Haft-e-Tir Metro Station, meaning 7th of Month of Tir, is a station of Mashhad Metro Line 1. The station opened on 10 October 2011. It is located on Vakilabad Expressway.
