= Alandasht Metro Station (Mashhad Metro) =

Metro station in Mashhad, Iran

Alandasht Metro Station ایستگاه مترو الندشت

General information
- Coordinates: 36.2877°N 59.5761°E
- System: Mashhad Metro Station
- Operator: Mashhad Urban Railway Operation Company(MUROC)

History
- Opened: 18 November 2019

Services
Preceding station	Mashhad Urban Railway	Following station
Shariati towards Tabarsi	Line 2	Kuhesangi towards Shahid Kaveh
Location

Alandasht Metro Station is a station of Mashhad Metro Line 2. The station began operation on 18 November 2019.
