= Shahid Mofatteh Metro Station (Mashhad) =

Metro station in Mashhad, Iran

Coordinates: 36°17′59.81″N 59°38′5.39″E

Shahid Mofatteh Metro Station ایستگاه مترو مفتح
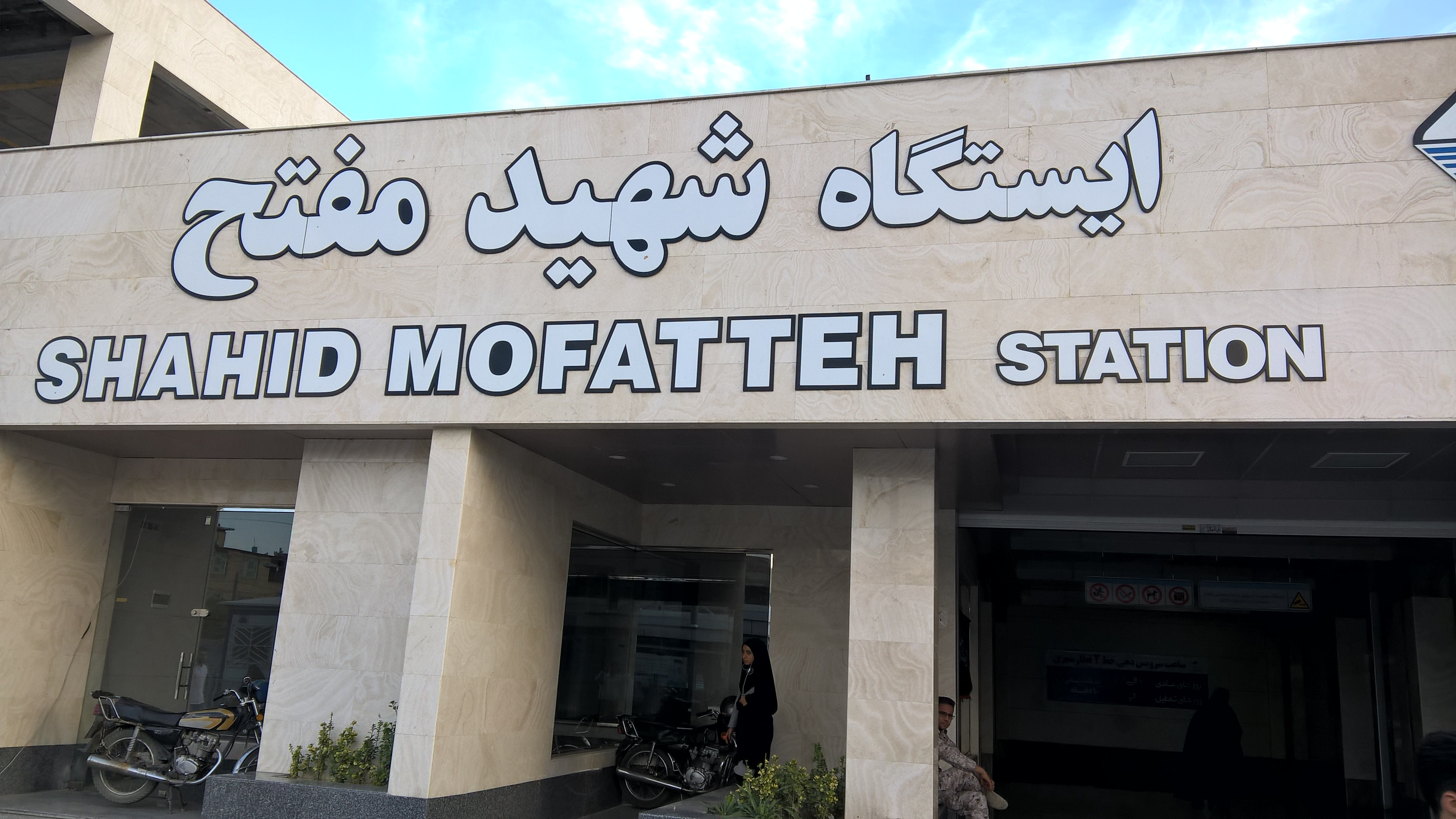

General information
- Location: Tabarsi Blvd. District 3, Mashhad, Mashhad County; Iran
- System: Mashhad Metro Station
- Operator: Mashhad Urban Railway Operation Company(MUROC)

History
- Opened: 28 Mordad 1396 H-Kh (17 August 2017)

Services
Preceding station	Mashhad Urban Railway	Following station
Nabovvat towards Tabarsi	Line 2	Raah Ahan towards Shahid Kaveh
Location

Mofatteh is a station of Mashhad Metro Line 2. The station opened on 17 August 2017. It is located on Tabarsi Boulevard.
