= Ghadir Metro Station (Mashhad Metro) =

Mashhad Metro station

Coordinates: 36°15′23.76″N 59°37′10.29″E

Ghadir Metro Station ایستگاه مترو غدیر
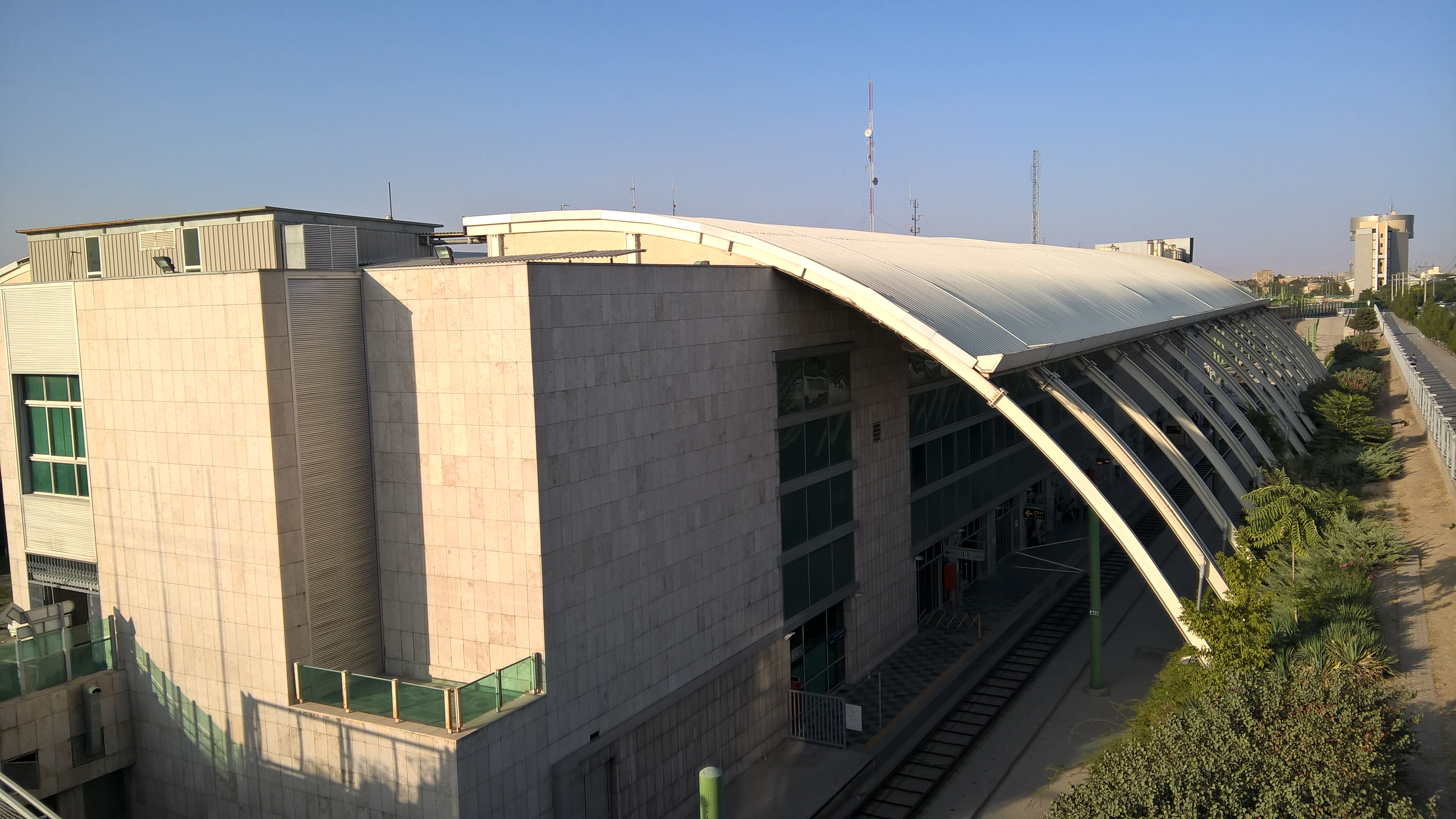

General information
- Location: Ghadir Expressway; District 7, Mashhad, Mashhad County; Iran
- System: Mashhad Metro Station
- Operator: Mashhad Urban Railway Operation Company(MUROC)
- Connections: Mashhad City Buses: 1 Ghadir-Vakil Abad (Express); 10 Ghadir-Vakil Abad

History
- Opened: 18 Mehr 1390 H-Kh (10 October 2011)

Services
Preceding station	Mashhad Urban Railway	Following station
Parvin-e-Etessami towards Vakil Abad	Line 1	Bustan-e Reyhaneh towards Hasheminejad Airport
Location

Ghadir Metro Station is a station of Mashhad Metro Line 1. The station opened on 10 October 2011. It is located along Ghadir Expressway. The line extends eastwards towards Mashhad International Airport.

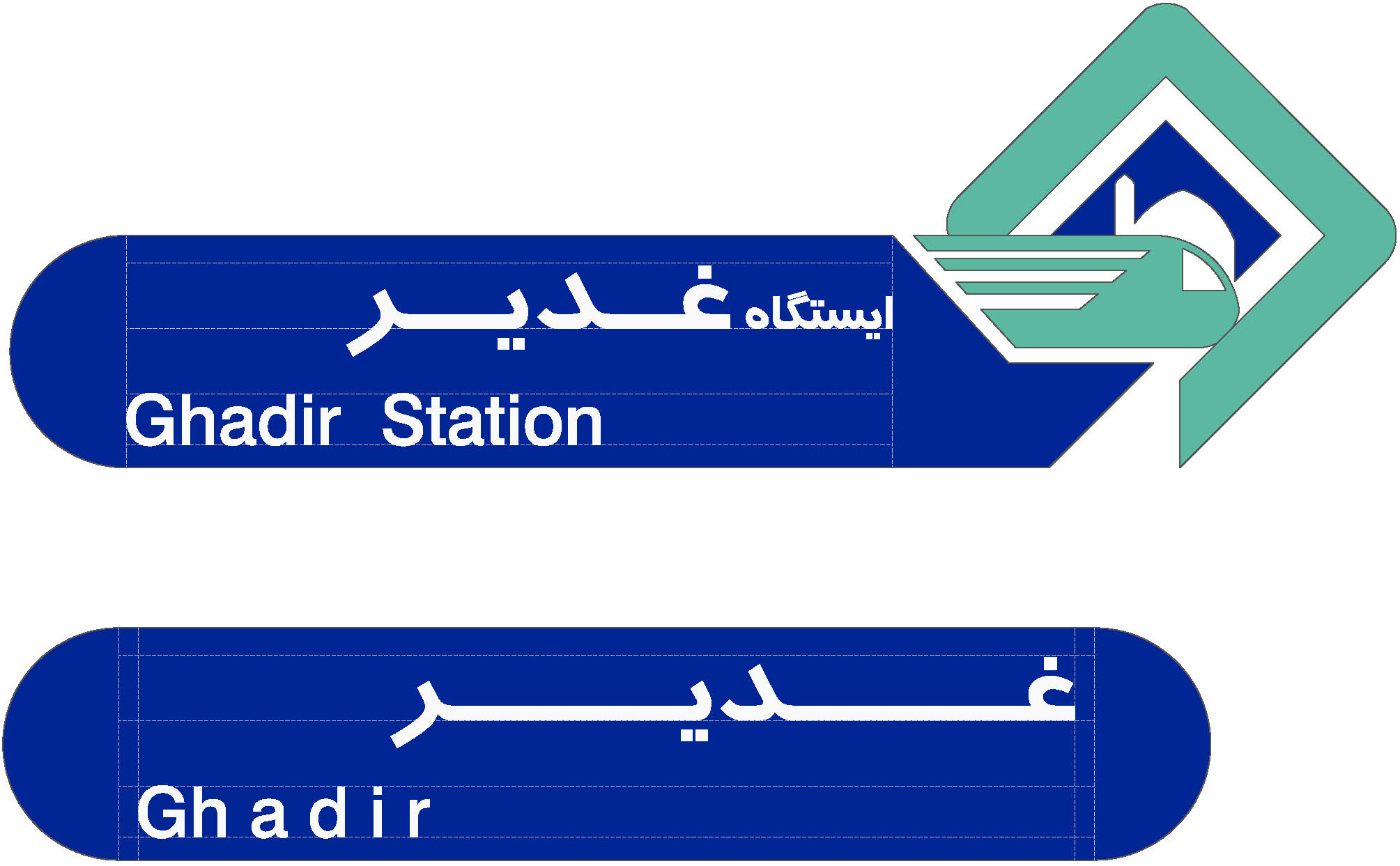
Typical Station Sign in the System
