= Imam Reza Stadium =

All-seated football stadium in Mashhad, Iran

AQR Stadium
- ورزشگاه ای کیو آر
- Interactive map of AQR Stadium
- Former names: Imam Reza Stadium
- Location: Mashhad, Iran
- Coordinates: 36°19′32″N 59°34′12″E
- Owner: Astan Quds Razavi
- Operator: A.Q.R. Athletic Institute
- Capacity: 27,700
- Executive suites: 70
- Surface: Desso GrassMaster
- Field size: 105 by 68 metres (115 by 74 yd)

Construction
- Groundbreaking: 5 March 2011
- Opened: 14 March 2017
- Cost: 2000 billion IR ($80 million)
- Project manager: Development Organization of Khorasan
- General contractor: Shaldeh
- Main contractor: Bonyan Beton Co.

Tenant
- Iran national football team (selected matches)

Website
- sport.aqr.ir

The Imam Reza Stadium (Persian: ورزشگاه امام رضا, Varzeshgâh-e Emâm Rezâ), currently known as the AQR Stadium for sponsorship reasons (Persian: ورزشگاه ای کیو آر, Varzeshgâh-e AQR), is an all-seated football stadium located in Mashhad, Iran. The stadium has a seating capacity of 27,700 and is the ninth biggest stadium in Iran. It hosts some matches of the Iran national football team. The stadium completed in January 2017 and was opened on 14 March 2017 on the day of Chaharshanbe Suri.

The stadium is in an area of Mashhad that belongs to the Astan Quds Razavi (AQR), a charitable foundation which manages the Imam Reza shrine. The stadium is located in the eastern side of the 2,000-hectare (7.7 sq mi) AQR Sports Complex and has a 5.4-hectare (13-acre) area. In addition to the football stadium, the complex has ten sport salons including tennis, basketball and volleyball arenas, swimming pools and water collection. The complex also has amphitheater, conference hall, dining hall, museum and coaching classes.

== History and design ==
The preliminary steps for building a new football stadium in Mashhad started in 2011. The stadium broke ground on 5 March 2013 and was planned to finish in mid-June 2016 but it delayed until January 2017. The stadium was set to open on 26 March 2016, but was postponed. The stadium was finally opened one year later on 14 March 2017 at the day of Chaharshanbe Suri. The stadium is named after Imam Ali al-Ridha, a descendant of the Islamic prophet Muhammad and the eighth Shi'ite imam.

== Structure and facilities ==
There are two gymnastics halls for men and women, two gyms, martial arts, table tennis, games, education, health and beauty, as well as conference halls, museums and collections of sports memorabilia, conference hall, medical clinic, buffet and natural turf soccer fields are among the other facilities in the complex. The cost of the gyms were 11 billion Iranian Rial.

== Development ==
Operations, including excavation and concrete structure, were set in a three-phase schedule, The first phase included excavation operations and the implementation of the concrete skeleton on the east side. The second phase of the project included construction of the northern concrete skeleton. The final concrete structures will be constructed at the end of the third phase of the project. The sport halls of the first and second phases are nearing completion.

== Transport Connections ==

Imam Reza Stadium lies on central parts of Mashhad and is situated near Khayyam Subway Station and Khayyam sq. BRT station. The stadium is 20 kilometres (12 mi) away from Mashhad International Airport that can be reached by either Subway, BRT or Taxi.

Nearby public transportation stations:

Service	Station	Line
Mashhad Metro	Khayyam Station	VakilAbad ↔ Airport
Mashhad Metro	Azadi Station	QasemAbad ↔ Abouzar
Mashhad BRT	L3S22	Emamieh ↔ Bahonar
Mashhad BRT	L3S23	Emamieh ↔ Bahonar

== International Matches ==
Iran National Football Team

Date	Team #1	Res.	Team #2	Competition	Attendance
29 March 2022	Iran	2–0	Lebanon	2022 FIFA World Cup qualification	22,453

== See also ==
- Football in Iran
- Samen Stadium
