= Raah Ahan Metro Station (Mashhad Metro) =

Metro station in Mashhad, Iran

Coordinates: 36°18′11.99″N 59°37′20.5″E

Raah Ahan Metro Station ایستگاه مترو راه آهن
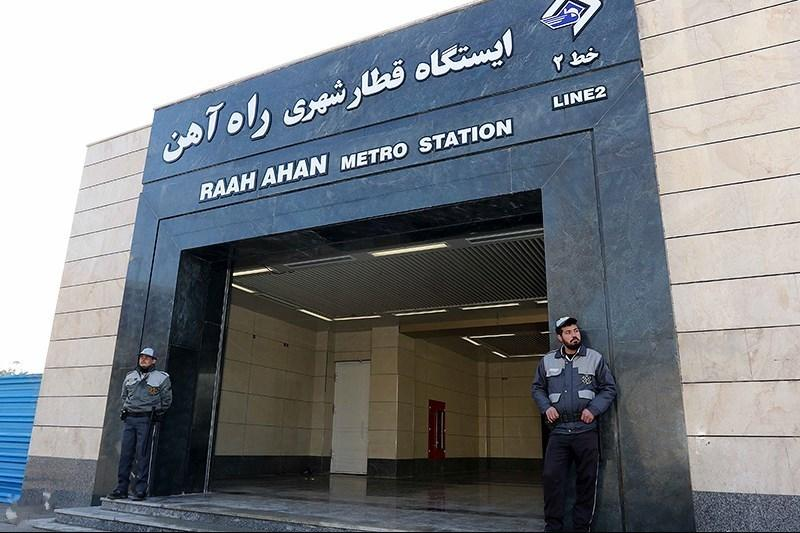

General information
- Location: Kamyab Blvd. District 3, Mashhad, Mashhad County; Iran
- System: Mashhad Metro Station
- Operator: Mashhad Urban Railway Operation Company(MUROC)
- Connections: Mashhad railway station

History
- Opened: 27 Bahman 1395 H-Kh (15 February 2017)

Services
| Preceding station | Mashhad Urban Railway | Following station |
|---|---|---|
| Mofateh towards Tabarsi | Line 2 | Shohada towards Shahid Kaveh |
Location

Raah Ahan Metro Station or Railway Metro Station is a station of Mashhad Metro Line 2. The station opened on 15 February 2017. It is located on Kamyab Boulevard, next to Mashhad railway station.
