= Azadi Metro Station (Mashhad Metro) =

Mashhad Metro station

Coordinates: 36°18′45.29″N 59°32′39.83″E

Azadi Metro Station ایستگاه مترو آزادی

General information
- Location: Malekabad Boulevard; Districts 1-9, Mashhad, Mashhad County; Iran
- System: Mashhad Metro Station
- Operator: Mashhad Urban Railway Operation Company(MUROC)
- Connections: Mashhad City Buses: 10 Ghadir-Vakil Abad; 38/1 Shohada-Azadi; 88 Khajeh Rabi-Azadi

History
- Opened: 18 Mehr 1390 H-Kh (10 October 2011)

Services
Preceding station	Mashhad Urban Railway	Following station
Park-e-Mellat towards Vakil Abad	Line 1	Khayyam towards Hasheminejad Airport
Location

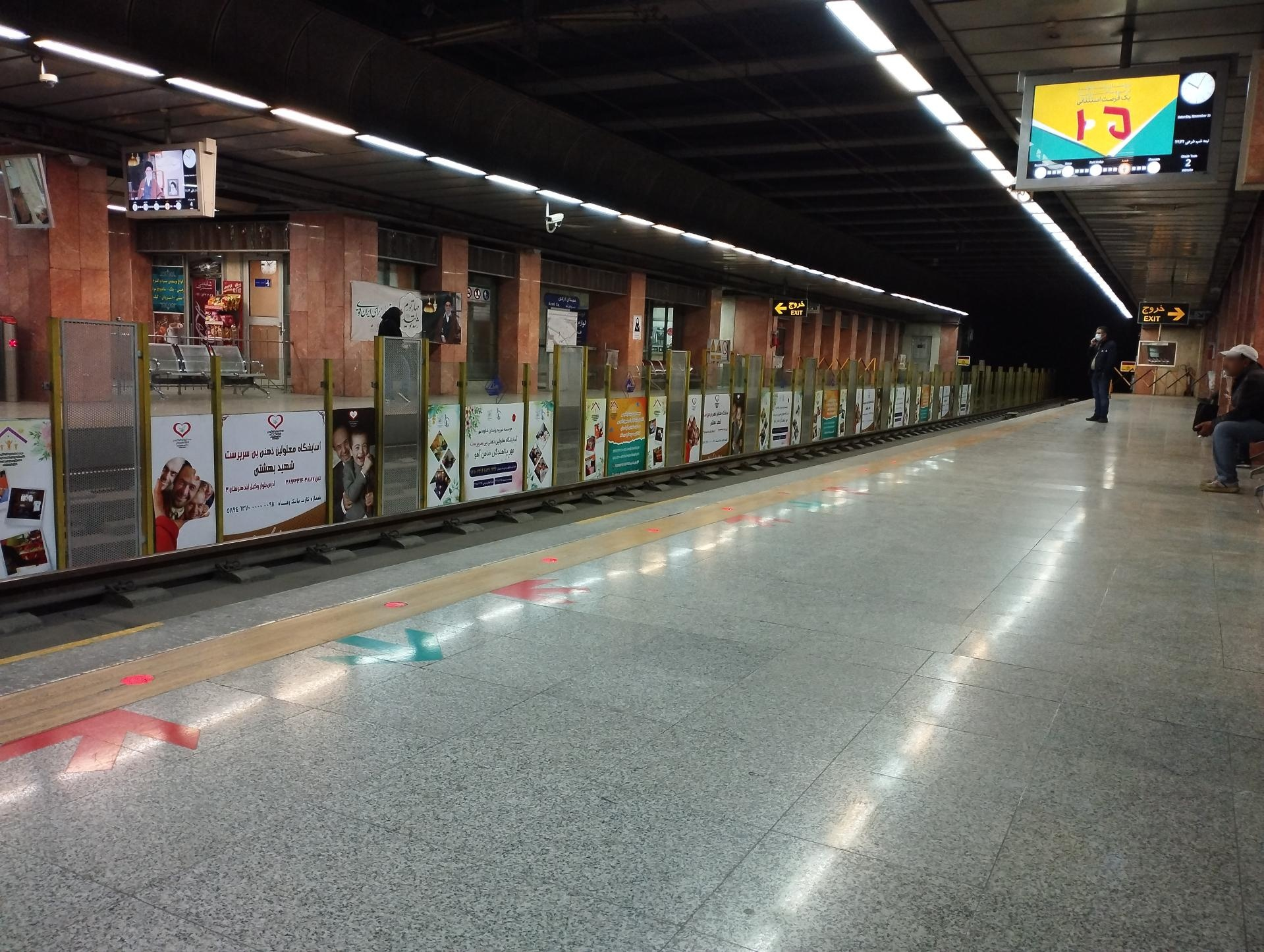
Istgah Azadi Square Line 1 Scene, Iran

Azadi Metro Station is a station of Mashhad Metro Line 1. The station opened on 10 October 2011. It is located on Malekabad Boulevard.
