= Fajr Metro Station (Mashhad Metro) =

Metro station in Mashhad, Iran

Coordinates: 36°18′45.1″N 59°39′18.18″E

Fajr Metro Station ایستگاه مترو فجر

General information
- Location: North Tabarsi Boulevard; Districts 3-4, Mashhad, Mashhad County; Iran
- System: Mashhad Metro Station
- Operator: Mashhad Urban Railway Operation Company(MUROC)

History
- Opened: 27 Bahman 1395 H-Kh (15 February 2017)

Services
Preceding station	Mashhad Urban Railway	Following station
Tabarsi Terminus	Line 2	Nabovvat towards Shahid Kaveh
Location

Fajr Metro Station is a station of Mashhad Metro Line 2. The station opened on 15 February 2017. It is located on North Tabarsi Boulevard. The station is named after Fajr Square, an interchange between Tabarsi Blvd. and the Expressway along north of Mashhad.
