= Khayyam Metro Station (Mashhad Metro) =

Mashhad Metro station

Coordinates: 36°18′25.1″N 59°33′10.47″E

Khayyam Metro Station ایستگاه مترو خیام
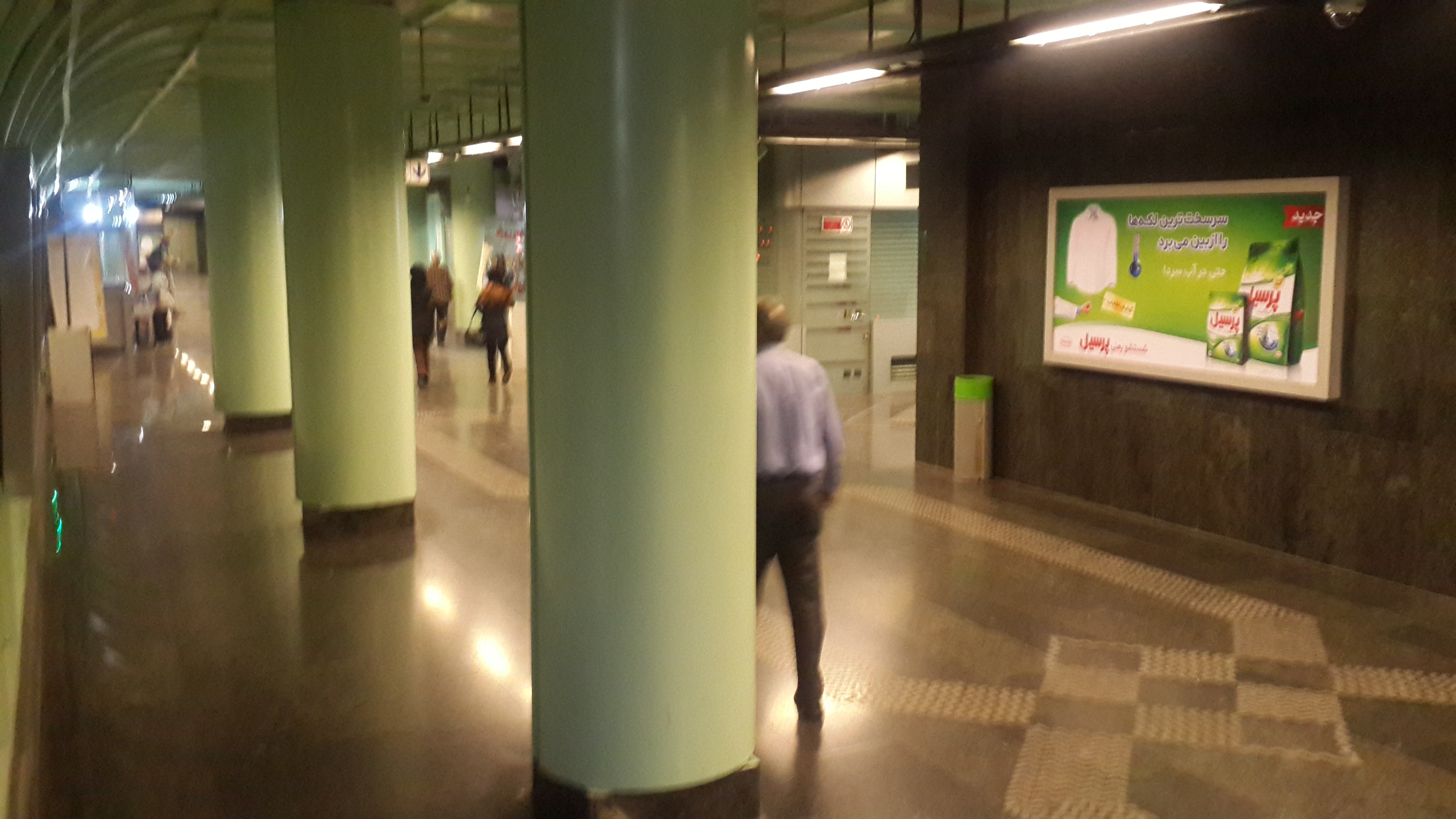

General information
- Location: Malekabad Boulevard; Districts 1-9, Mashhad, Mashhad County; Iran
- System: Mashhad Metro Station
- Operator: Mashhad Urban Railway Operation Company(MUROC)
- Connections: Mashhad City Buses: 88 Khajeh Rabi-Azadi

History
- Opened: 18 Mehr 1390 H-Kh (10 October 2011)

Services
Preceding station	Mashhad Urban Railway	Following station
Azadi towards Vakil Abad	Line 1	Palestine towards Hasheminejad Airport
Location

Khayyam Metro Station is a station of Mashhad Metro Line 1. The station opened on 10 October 2011. It is located on Malekabad Boulevard.
