= Shahid Javan Station (Mashhad Metro) =

Metro station in Mashhad, Iran

Salamat Metro Station ایستگاه مترو سلامت

General information
- System: Mashhad Metro Station
- Operator: Mashhad Urban Railway Operation Company(MUROC)

History
- Opened: Under Construction

Services
Preceding station	Mashhad Urban Railway	Following station
Shahid Kaveh towards Tabarsi	Line 2	Terminus

Salamat Metro Station is a station of Mashhad Metro Line 2. The station is currently under construction.
