= Saadi Metro Station (Mashhad Metro) =

Metro station in Mashhad, Iran

Coordinates: 36°17′43.24″N 59°35′53.96″E

Saadi Metro Station ایستگاه مترو سعدی
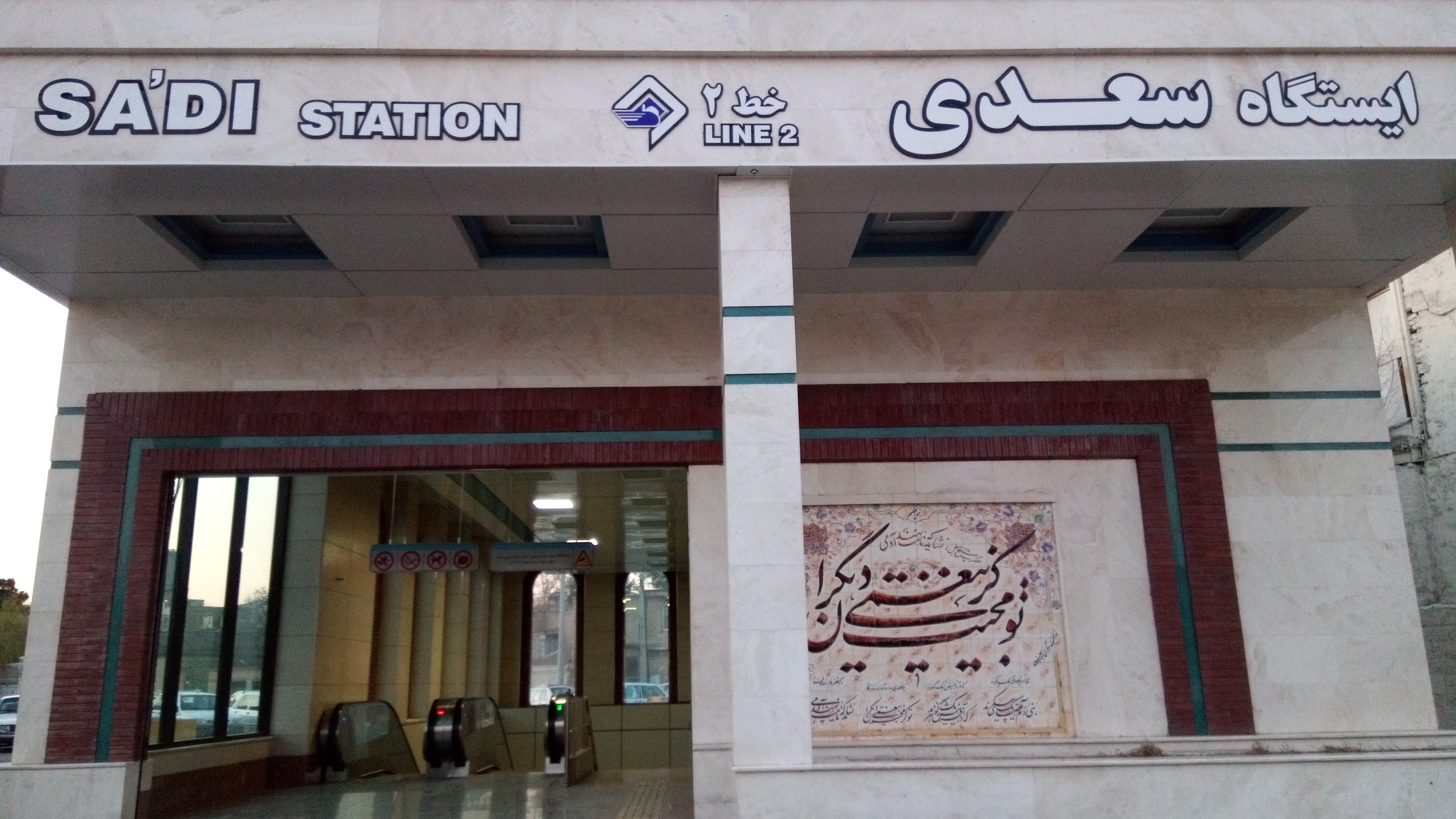

General information
- Location: ُsaadi Sq. Districts 1-8, Mashhad, Mashhad County; Iran
- System: Mashhad Metro Station
- Operator: Mashhad Urban Railway Operation Company(MUROC)
- Connections: Mashhad City Buses

History
- Opened: 29 Esfand 1396 H-Kh (20 March 2018)

Services
Preceding station	Mashhad Urban Railway	Following station
Shohada towards Tabarsi	Line 2	Shariati towards Shahid Kaveh
Location

Saadi Metro Station is a station of Mashhad Metro Line 2. The station opened on 20 March 2018. It is located on Saadi Sq.
