= Kuhesangi Metro Station (Mashhad Metro) =

Metro station in Mashhad, Iran

Kuhesangi Metro Station ایستگاه مترو کوهسنگی

General information
- System: Mashhad Metro Station
- Operator: Mashhad Urban Railway Operation Company(MUROC)
- Connections: Mashhad City Buses

History
- Opened: 10 December 2019

Services
Preceding station	Mashhad Urban Railway	Following station
Alandasht towards Tabarsi	Line 2	Shahid Kaveh Terminus
Location

Kuhesangi Metro Station is a station of Mashhad Metro Line 2. The station started its operation on 10 December 2019.
