= Bustan-e Reyhaneh Metro Station (Mashhad Metro) =

Mashhad Metro station

Coordinates: 36°14′32.02″N 59°37′27.31″E

Bustan-e Reyhaneh Metro Station ایستگاه مترو بوستان ریحانه

General information
- Location: Parvaz Square; District 7, Mashhad, Mashhad County; Iran
- System: Mashhad Metro Station
- Operator: Mashhad Urban Railway Operation Company(MUROC)
- Connections: Mashhad City Buses: 77 Enghelab - Airport

History
- Opened: 17 Bahman 1394 H-Sh (6 February 2016)

Services
Preceding station	Mashhad Urban Railway	Following station
Ghadir towards Vakil Abad	Line 1	Hasheminejad Airport Terminus
Location

Bustan-e Reyhaneh Metro Station is a station of Mashhad Metro Line 1. The station is on Parvaz Square, at the entrance of the airport property, and 2.5 km away from the terminal. The station provides access to Reyhaneh Park nearby, and is named after it. Originally it was to be called Parvaz Metro Station.
