= Shahid Fakouri Metro Station (Mashhad Metro) =

Metro station in Mashhad, Iran

Shahid Fakouri Metro Station ایستگاه مترو شهید فکوری

General information
- System: Mashhad Metro Station
- Operator: Mashhad Urban Railway Operation Company(MUROC)

History
- Opened: May 3, 2025

Services
Preceding station	Mashhad Urban Railway	Following station
Shahid Kaveh towards Tabarsi	Line 2	Terminus

Shahid Fakouri Metro Station is a station of Line 2 of the Mashhad Urban Railway. The station became Line 2's southern terminus when it opened on May 3rd, 2025. It is located at the crossroads of Kaveh Boulevard and Shahid Fakouri Boulevard, near the Mashhad University of Medical Sciences.
