= Shohada square project =

Iranian urban design and architecture project

The Shohada Square project is an underway urban design and architecture project in Mashhad, Iran, run by the Iranian government.

== Historical background ==
Shohada Square is an old square in the city of Mashhad, in northeastern Iran. It was built in 1922 as Mashhad's first modern square in the period of the first Pahlavi shah, Reza Shah. It was called Shah's Square but became commonly known as Mojassame (meaning statue) square because there was a statue of Reza Shah located there. The significance of this square is in its nearness to the shrine of Imam Reza and also to a gate for northern Khorasan county roads. The square was part of a new plan for changing the face of Iran's major cities to adopt them to a new motorized transport system and a more European look that was very common during the Pahlavi dynasty.

One of the key moments in the history of the 1979 Iranian revolution was the taking down of the statue of the Shah from the centre of this square and changing its name to Shohada (meaning martyrs).

== Renovation plan ==
After 2000, the square became the focus of attention again, as a large commercial center of the city and a meeting place for 14 million pilgrims a year. The site was considered a strong prospect for a new building and became the subject of much debate among architects and planners. The square was also viewed as a place where the city of Mashhad could re-establish its position in modern Iran. More than just a building site, Shohada Square became seen as a statement of post-revolution architecture and urban design attitudes.

The new plan consists of two tunnels (one from west to east and the other from east to west) to reduce the heavy traffic on the main level of the project. An extension to the old municipality building and a new city hall is planned, along with more than four other official and commercial buildings. Two hotels, a new boulevard, shopping malls, and a large plaza are also planned.

These improvements are planned to increase economic prosperity, promotions for businesses, and improve the social and environmental layout of the square. The goal of the project is to transform the Square from unfilled office buildings to public open space and better infrastructure.

== See also ==
- Mashhad
- Khorasan Razavi
