= Bahman =

- Native name: بهمن (Persian); دلو (Dari); Rêbendan (Kurdish); Баҳман / Далв (Tajik)
- Calendar: Solar Hijri calendar
- Month number: 11
- Number of days: 30
- Season: Winter
- Gregorian equivalent: January–February

Bahman (Persian: بهمن, Persian pronunciation: [bæhˈmæn]) is the eleventh and penultimate month of the Solar Hijri calendar, the official calendar of Iran and Afghanistan. Bahman has 30 days. It begins on 21 January and ends on 19 February in the Gregorian calendar. The month is equivalent to Aquarius in the Zodiac.

Bahman is the second month of winter, and is followed by Esfand. In modern Persian "Bahman" also means "snow avalanche"

Bahman is a derivative modern form of the Avestan Vohu Manah (Vôhü Manö) consisting of two parts: VÔHÜ coming from the root vah, from Proto-Indo-European *ves meaning "to revere, stand in awe of", and MAN meaning 'passion, determination, spirit, mind power'. Vohu Manah is a concept in Zoroastrianism meaning pure mind/spirit or absolute consciousness.

== Events ==
- 4 – 1302 – The Opening Ceremony of the 1924 Winter Olympics is held in Chamonix in France. Formerly titled as the "International Winter Sports Week", the Games were made in response to calls made in a 1920 IOC meeting to give winter sports their chance in the Olympic Games.
- 8 – 1279 – the American League, the younger of the two leagues constituting Major League Baseball, was officially founded on the basis of the teams comprising a former regional minor league, the Western League.
- 13 – 1252 – The National League, the older of the two leagues constituting Major League Baseball, was founded.
- 13 – 1323 – The Battle of Manila (1945) begins.
- 14 – 1326 – Sri Lanka, then Ceylon, gains independence in the Commonwealth, with full Dominion status.
- 22 – 1357 – The Supreme Military Council of Iran declares itself neutral in the face of resistance of Ayatollah Ruhollah Khomeini's forces against pro-Shah elements, toppling the monarchy and ending the Iranian Revolution.
- 15 – 1394 – Bangladesh Bank heist

== Births ==
- 10 – 1297 – Jackie Robinson, second baseman for the Brooklyn Dodgers, first African American player in modern-day Major League Baseball
- 24 – 1364 – Todd Frazier, professional baseball player for the New York Mets, 34th overall draft pick in the 2007 Major League Baseball Draft, brother of Jeff Frazier, Olympic silver medalist

== Observances ==
- Chinese New Year – Movable (either on the first to third week of Bahman)
- Super Bowl Sunday – Third or Fourth Sunday of Bahman
- Washington's Birthday and President's Day – Last Monday of Bahman
- Bahmanagān – 2 Bahman, Zoroastrian holiday
- Republic Day (India) and Australia Day – 6–7 Bahman
- Sadeh (Persian: سده also transliterated as Sade), The Iranian fire festival – 10 Bahman
- Candlemas - 12 or 13 Bahman
- National Day of Sri Lanka – 16 Bahman
- Islamic Revolution Day – 22 Bahman
- Valentine's Day – 25–26 Bahman
