= Shahid Kaveh Metro Station (Mashhad Metro) =

Metro station in Mashhad, Iran

Shahid Kaveh Metro Station ایستگاه مترو شهید کاوه

General information
- Coordinates: 36.2845184°N 59.549228°E
- System: Mashhad Metro Station
- Operator: Mashhad Urban Railway Operation Company(MUROC)
- Connections: Mashhad City Buses: BRT 4 Elahiyeh Term. - Imam Reza Term.

History
- Opened: July 27, 2019

Services
Preceding station	Mashhad Urban Railway	Following station
Kuhesangi towards Tabarsi	Line 2	Salamat towards Shahid Kaveh
Location

Shahid Kaveh Metro Station is a station of Mashhad Metro Line 2. The station began operation on July 27, 2019. On August 9, 2019, official inauguration of station ceremony was held with the presence of Iranian vice president Eshagh Jahangiri.
