= Tabarsi Metro Station (Mashhad Metro) =

Mashhad Metro Station

Coordinates: 36°19′30.41″N 59°40′31.12″E

Tabarsi Metro Station ایستگاه مترو طبرسی

General information
- Location: North Tabarsi Boulevard; Districts 3-4, Mashhad, Mashhad County; Iran
- System: Mashhad Metro Station
- Operator: Mashhad Urban Railway Operation Company(MUROC)

History
- Opened: 27 Bahman 1395 H-Kh (15 February 2017)

Services
Preceding station	Mashhad Urban Railway	Following station
Terminus	Line 2	Velayat towards Shahid Kaveh
Location

Tabarsi Metro Station is the northern terminus of Mashhad Metro Line 2. The station opened on 15 February 2017. Prior to opening, the station was to be called Kashaf Roud Station, named after Kashafrud River, a river defining the northern limits of the city of Mashhad, as the train depot of the line was located on the right bank of the river several hundred meters north of this station. In its initial opening days it was called Velayat Station but the City Council decided to replace the names of stations 1 and 2 of line 2. It is located on North Tabarsi Boulevard.
