= Vakil Abad Metro Station (Mashhad Metro) =

Mashhad Metro station

Coordinates: 36°20′46.12″N 59°26′32.17″E

Vakil Abad Metro Station ایستگاه مترو وکیل آباد
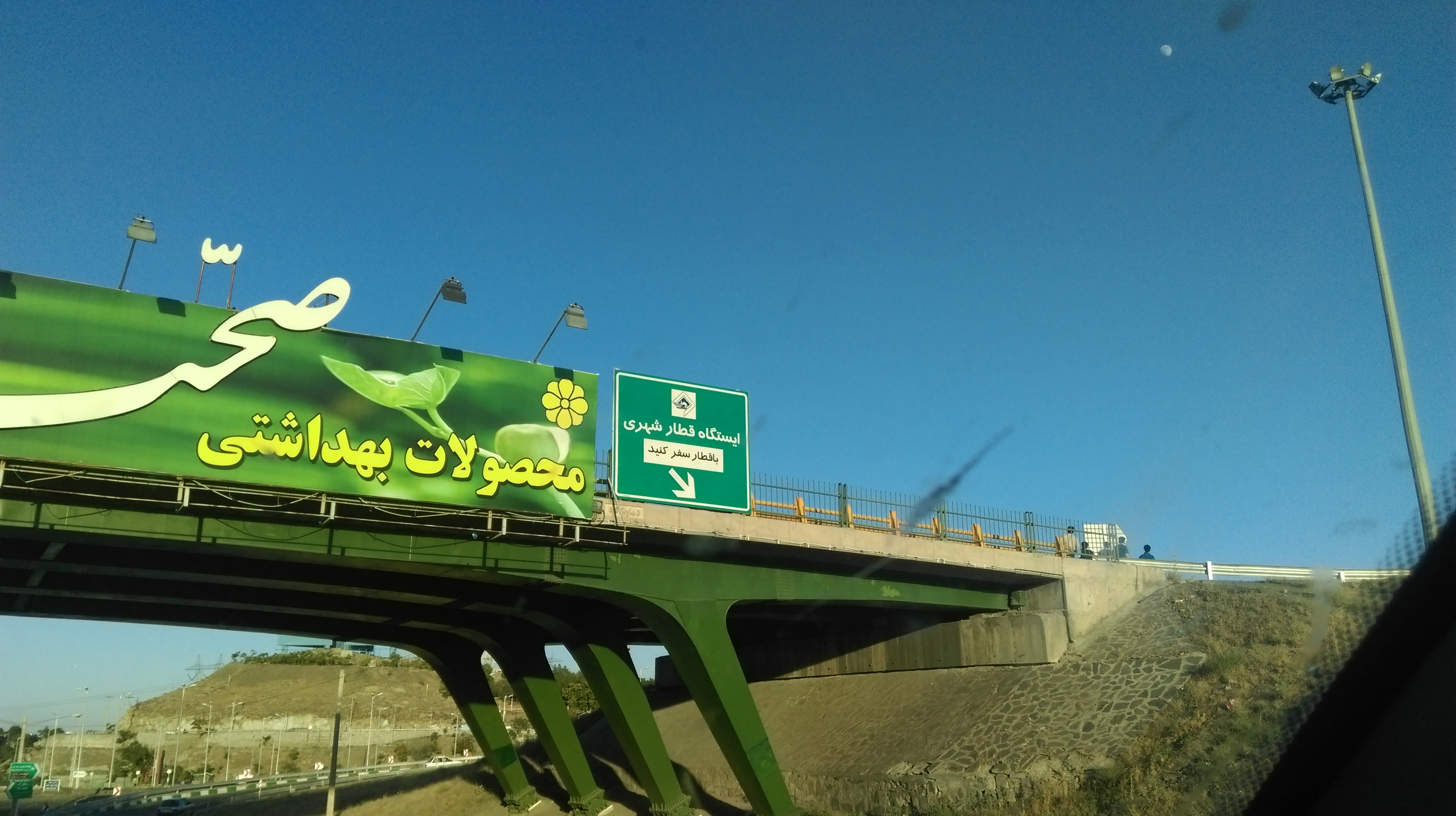

General information
- Location: Vakilabad Expressway; Districts 9-11, Mashhad, Mashhad County; Iran
- System: Mashhad Metro Station
- Operator: Mashhad Urban Railway Operation Company(MUROC)
- Connections: Vakil Abad Bus Terminal Mashhad City Buses: 1 Ghadir-Vakil Abad (Express); 10 Ghadir-Vakil Abad; 11 Vakil Abad-Ferdowsi; 12, 12/1 Vakil Abad-Haram-e Motahhar; 90 Vakil Abad-Enqelab; 91 Felestin-Shahrak Vali Asr-Vakil Abad; 94/1 Azadi-Piruzi-Vakil Abad; 99 Khajeh Rabi-Vakil Abad; 111 Vakil Abad-Torqabeh; 113 Vakil Abad-Hesar Golestan; 114 Vakil Abad-Jagharq; 115, 115/1 Vakil Abad-Naghdar; 121 Vakil Abad-Shandiz; 123 Vakil Abad-Abardeh-e Olya

History
- Opened: 18 Mehr 1390 H-Kh (10 October 2011)

Services
Preceding station	Mashhad Urban Railway	Following station
Terminus	Line 1	Kuhestan Park towards Hasheminejad Airport
Location

Vakil Abad Metro Station is the western terminus of Mashhad Metro Line 1. The station opened on 10 October 2011. It is located on western end of Vakilabad Expressway. The station will also be the eastern terminus of Mashhad-Golbahar Commuter Rail Line.
