= Hasheminejad Airport Metro Station (Mashhad Metro) =

Metro station in Mashhad, Iran

Coordinates: 36°13′31.05″N 59°38′37.85″E

Hasheminejad Airport Metro Station ایستگاه مترو فرودگاه هاشمی نژاد

General information
- Location: Hasheminejad Blvd. District 7, Mashhad, Mashhad County; Iran
- System: Mashhad Metro Station
- Operator: Mashhad Urban Railway Operation Company(MUROC)
- Connections: Mashhad Hasheminejad International Airport Mashhad City Buses: 77 Enghelab - Airport

History
- Opened: 17 Bahman 1394 H-Kh (6 February 2016)

Services
Preceding station	Mashhad Urban Railway	Following station
Bustan-e Reyhaneh towards Vakil Abad	Line 1	Terminus
Location

Hasheminejad Airport Metro Station is a station of Mashhad Metro Line 1. The station serves as an access point to Mashhad Shahid Hasheminejad International Airport and provides an indoor connection to the airport terminal. The station building is located adjacent to the airport terminal.
