= Mehr (month) =

- Native name: مهر (Persian); میزان (Dari); Rezber (Kurdish); Меҳр / Мизон (Tajik)
- Calendar: Solar Hijri calendar
- Month number: 7
- Number of days: 30
- Season: Autumn
- Gregorian equivalent: September-October

Mehr (Persian: مهر, Persian pronunciation: [mehɾ]) is the seventh month of the Solar Hijri calendar, the official calendar of Iran and Afghanistan. Mehr has 30 days. It begins on 23 September and ends on 22 October in the Gregorian calendar.

Mehr is the first month of autumn, and is followed by Aban.

It is named after the Iranian deity Mithra.

== Events ==
- 21 Mehr - 1154 - Continental Navy established
- 29 Mehr - 1184 - Battle of Trafalgar
- 8 Mehr - 1282 - Game 1 of the 1903 World Series, the first ever in the modern Major League Baseball era, begins in Boston's Huntington Avenue Baseball Grounds.
- 17 Mehr - 1290 - Wuchang (Wuhan) Uprising - Xinhai Revolution in China marks the beginning of the end of Qing imperial rule.
- 4 Mehr - 1299 - The first regular season games of the future National Football League officially begin.
- 12 - 1324 - Establishment of the Indonesian National Armed Forces
- 9 - 1328 - Proclamation of the People's Republic of China
- 8 - 1344 - 30 September coup attempt in Indonesia.
- 20 - 1350 - Celebrations of the 2,500 year celebration of the Persian Empire officially commence.
- 23 - 1358 - Salvadorian Civil War begins
- 11 - 1369 - German reunification
- 21 - 1370 - USS Cole bombing
- 18 - 1394 - 2015 Ankara bombings
- 9 - 1401 - Recapture of Lyman by Ukrainian forces
- 25 - 1401 - The Mahsa Amini protests commence

== Deaths ==
- 27 - 1392 - Mahmoud Zoufonoun, Iranian musician.
- 22 - 1395 - Bhumibol Adulyadej

== Holidays ==
- Mitrakana - 1 Mehr
- Meskel - 5 or 6 Mehr
- National Day of Pancasila Sanctity and 30 September Movement Memorial Day - 8 or 9 Mehr
- Mehregan - 8 or 9 Mehr
- National Day of the People's Republic of China - 8 or 9 Mehr
- German Unity Day - 11/12 Mehr
- Feast of the Holy Rosary - 14/15 Mehr
- National Day of the Republic of China - 16 or 17 Mehr
- Columbus Day and National Day of Spain -20 or 21 Mehr
- United States Navy Birthday - 21 or 22 Mehr
- Defenders Day (Ukraine) - 22 or 23 Mehr
- Bhumibol Adulyadej Death Anniversary Memorial Day - 23-24 Mehr
- Trafalgar Day - 28 Mehr (29 in leap years)
