= Mashhad Urban Railway =

Urban rail line in Iran

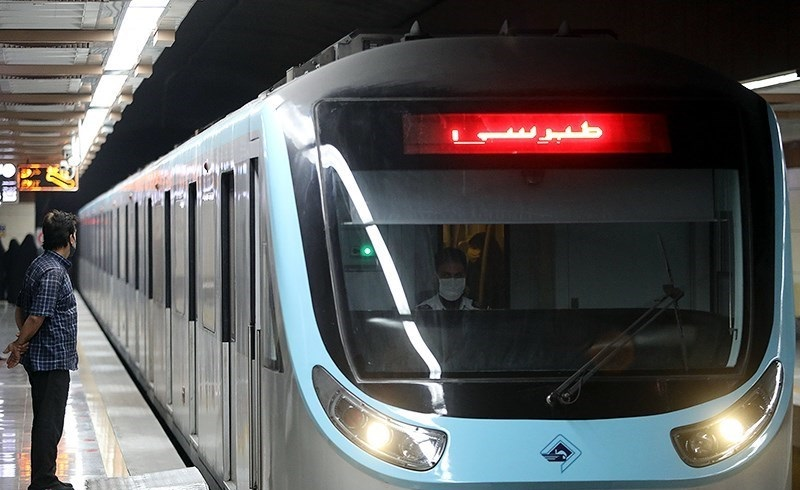

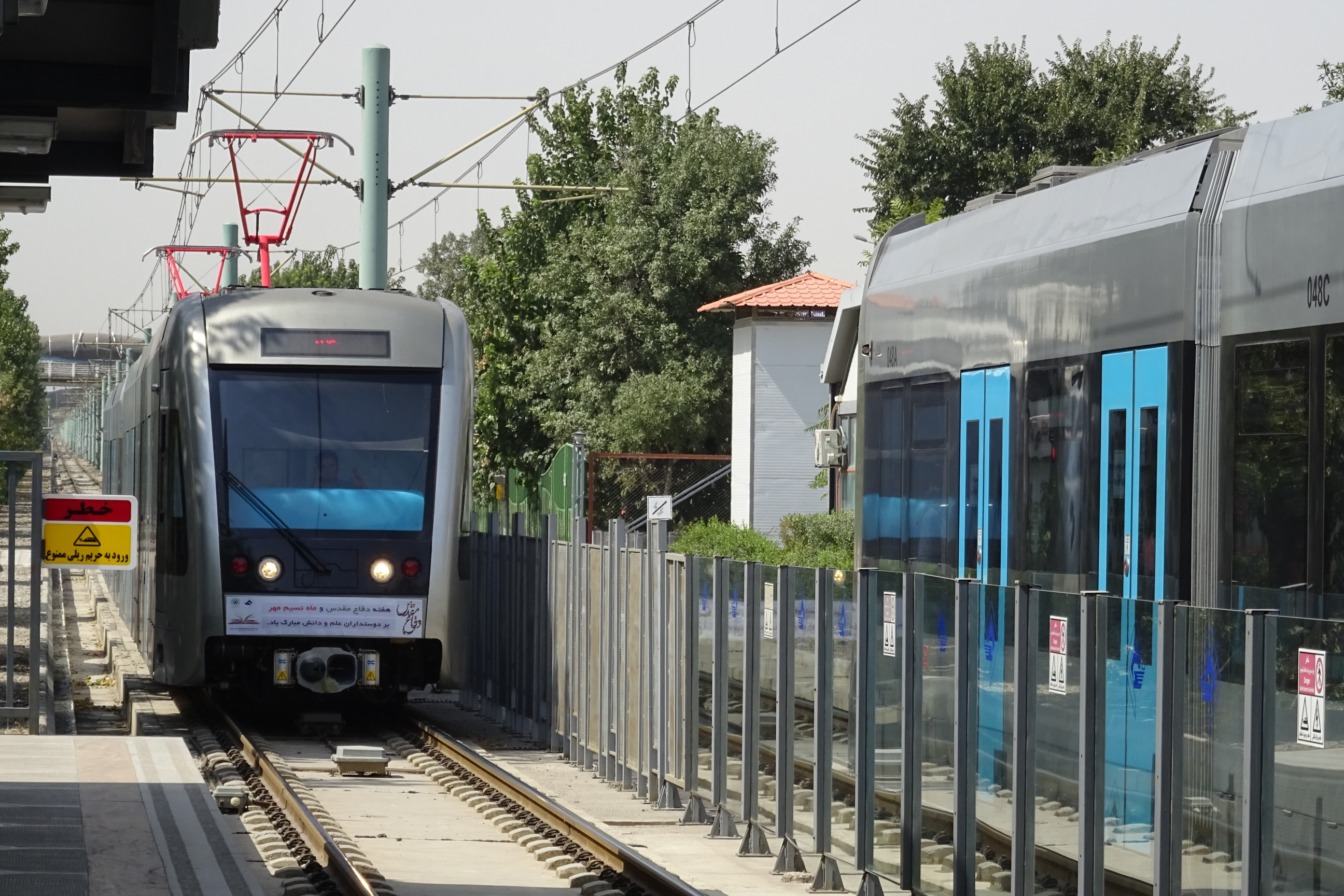

Overview
- Native name: قطار شهری مشهد
- Owner: Mashhad Municipality
- Locale: Mashhad, Razavi Khorasan, Iran
- Transit type: Rapid transit
- Number of lines: 4 (3 Active)
- Number of stations: Total 82, active 40
- Daily ridership: 123,000 (Line 1), 63,000 (Line 2)
- Website: Mashhad Urban Railway Operation Company (MUROC)

Operation
- Began operation: 12 March 2011; 15 years ago
- Operator: Mashhad Urban Railway Operation Company (MUROC)
- Number of vehicles: 160
- Headway: 5 minutes in peak hours, 7 minutes in off peak hours and 12 minutes in holidays (line 1), 10 minutes (line 2)

Technical
- System length: Total 90.5 km (56.2 mi), active 43.3 km (26.9 mi)
- Track gauge: 1,435 mm (4 ft 8 1/2 in) standard gauge
System map
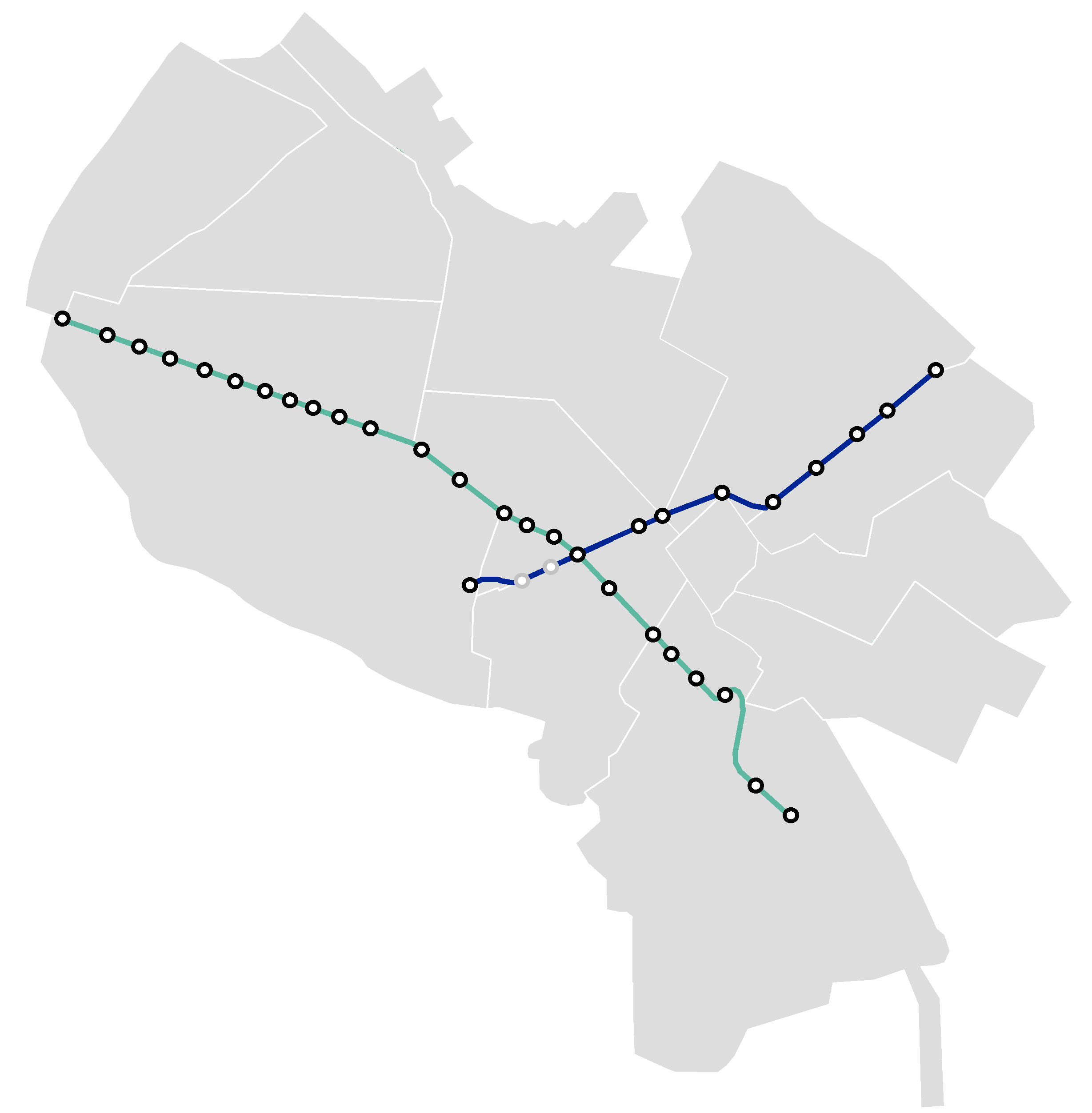

Mashhad Urban Railway (Persian: قطار شهری مشهد, the literal translation of the name from Persian) is a rapid transit system in Mashhad, Iran. It is the second oldest rapid transit system in Iran. The system has been known by a number of terms, including "light rail" or "light metro" and "urban rail" or "metro", but while its lines are built to different standards the system features full-grade separation and the frequent headways generally associated with rapid transit. The Mashhad Urban Railway operates Line 1 from 6 to 22:00 daily.

As of 2025, the system operates 3 lines; Line 1, inaugurated in 2011, is an east-west light rail line connecting to the airport. Line 2, inaugurated in 2017, is a heavy rail route along the city's north-south axis. Line 3, in partial operation since 2025, is also built to heavy rail standards and serves the central area around Imam Reza shrine.

== List of stations ==
Mashhad Metro has 4 inner-city lines (1, 2, 3, 4). The total number of stations on these lines is 83 with a length of 90.5 km.

== Network ==
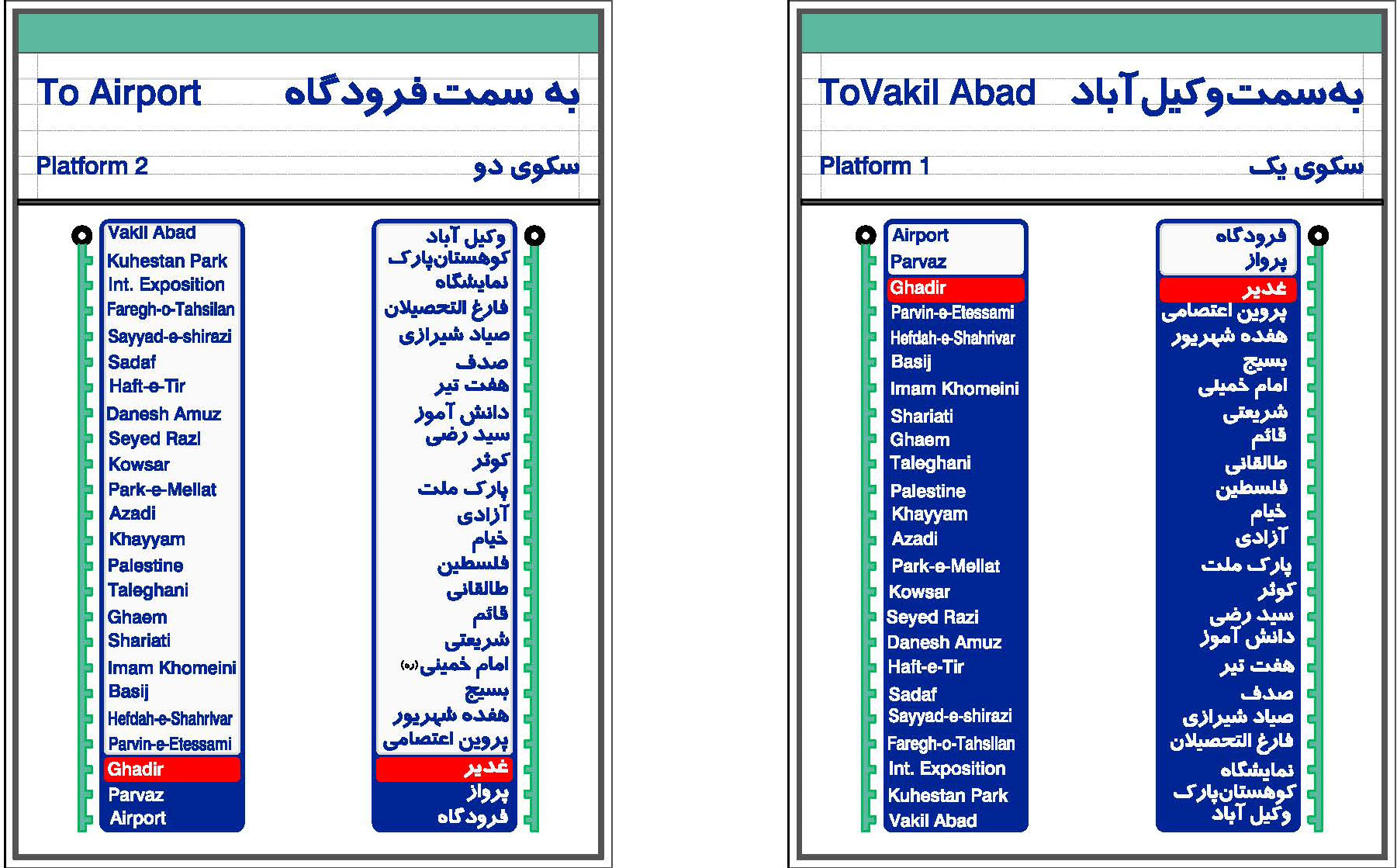
Pictogramme

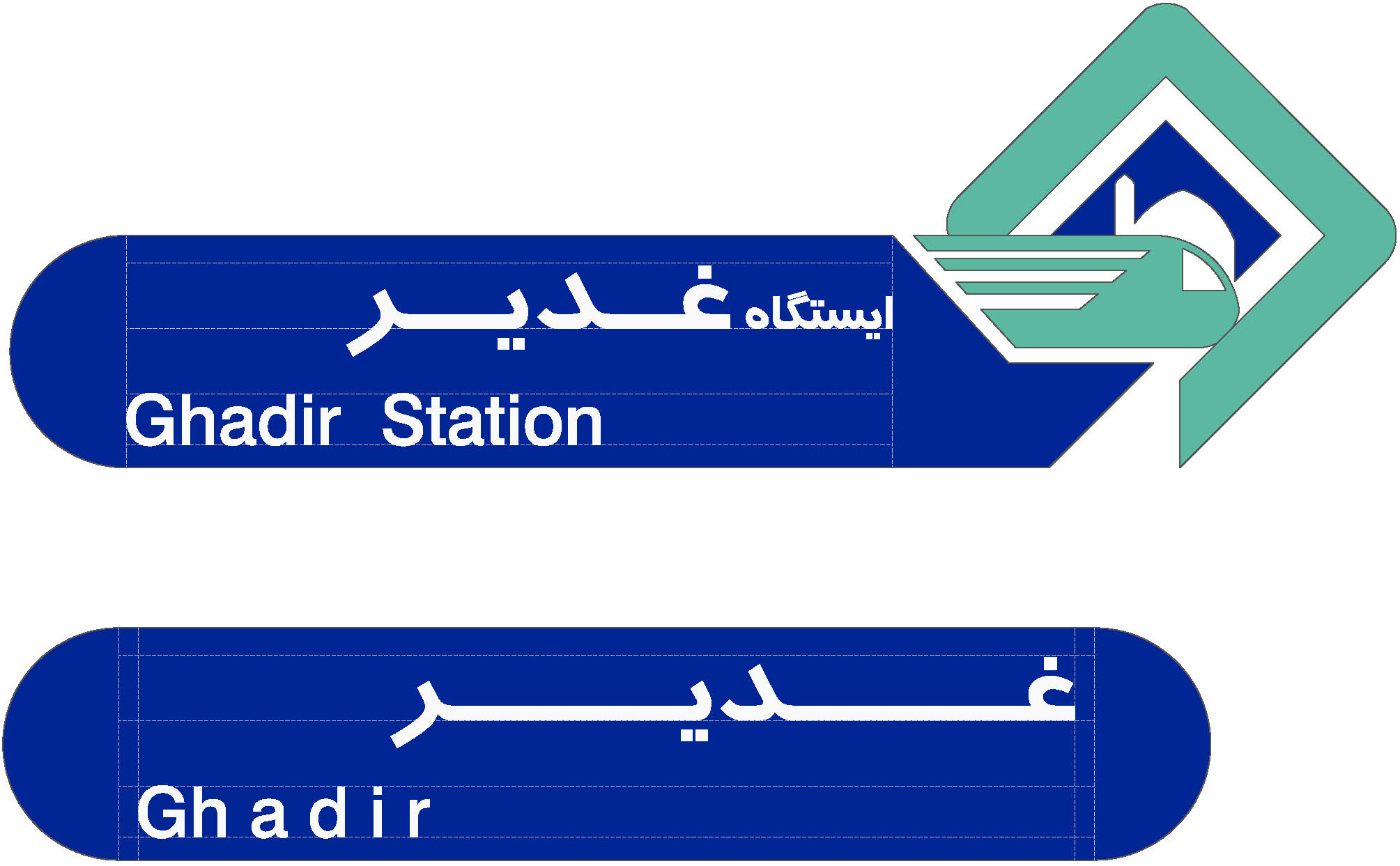
Typical Station Sign in the System

=== Line 1 ===
The 19.5-kilometre (12.1 mi), 22 station Line 1 was the first line to be built; construction began in 1999, with the inauguration of taking place on 24 April 2011. The line originally ran from Vakil Abad to Ghadir.

Line 1 currently runs between Hasheminejad Airport in the east and Vakil Abad in the southwest, with travel time of 41 minutes. Approximately half the route is in tunnels; the rest is at ground level.

==== Line 1 Expansion ====
Expansion of Line 1 added 4.5 km (2.8 mi) of underground railroads and 2 stations (Bustan-e Reyhaneh and Hasheminejad Airport), connecting Mashhad International Airport to the Mashhad Urban Railway. Line 1 reached a total of 24 stations (13 underground, 11 on-ground) along 24 km (15 mi) of track, as 15.5 km (9.6 mi) in tunnels plus 8.5 km (5.3 mi) on-ground, and a ridership capacity of 170,000 passengers per day, along with daily operation between 6 am and 10 pm. The extension made Mashhad the first city in Iran with a mass transit connection to the airport.

=== Line 2 ===
Line 2 is a conventional metro, running north–south for 14.5 km (9.0 mi) between Shahid Fakouri and Tabarsi with 13 stations. Excavation was done by two Tunnel Boring Machines (TBMs). From February 2017 limited operation of the first phase of Line 2 began. The line connects to the inter-urban railway system at Raah Ahan. On 20 March 2018 pilot operation of Shariati, the first interchange station in the system, began. The station was officially inaugurated on 7 May 2018, in a ceremony attended by Iranian president Hassan Rouhani. On July 27, 2019, Shahid Kaveh was opened. The line was further extended to Shahid Fakouri on May 3, 2025.

=== Line 3 ===
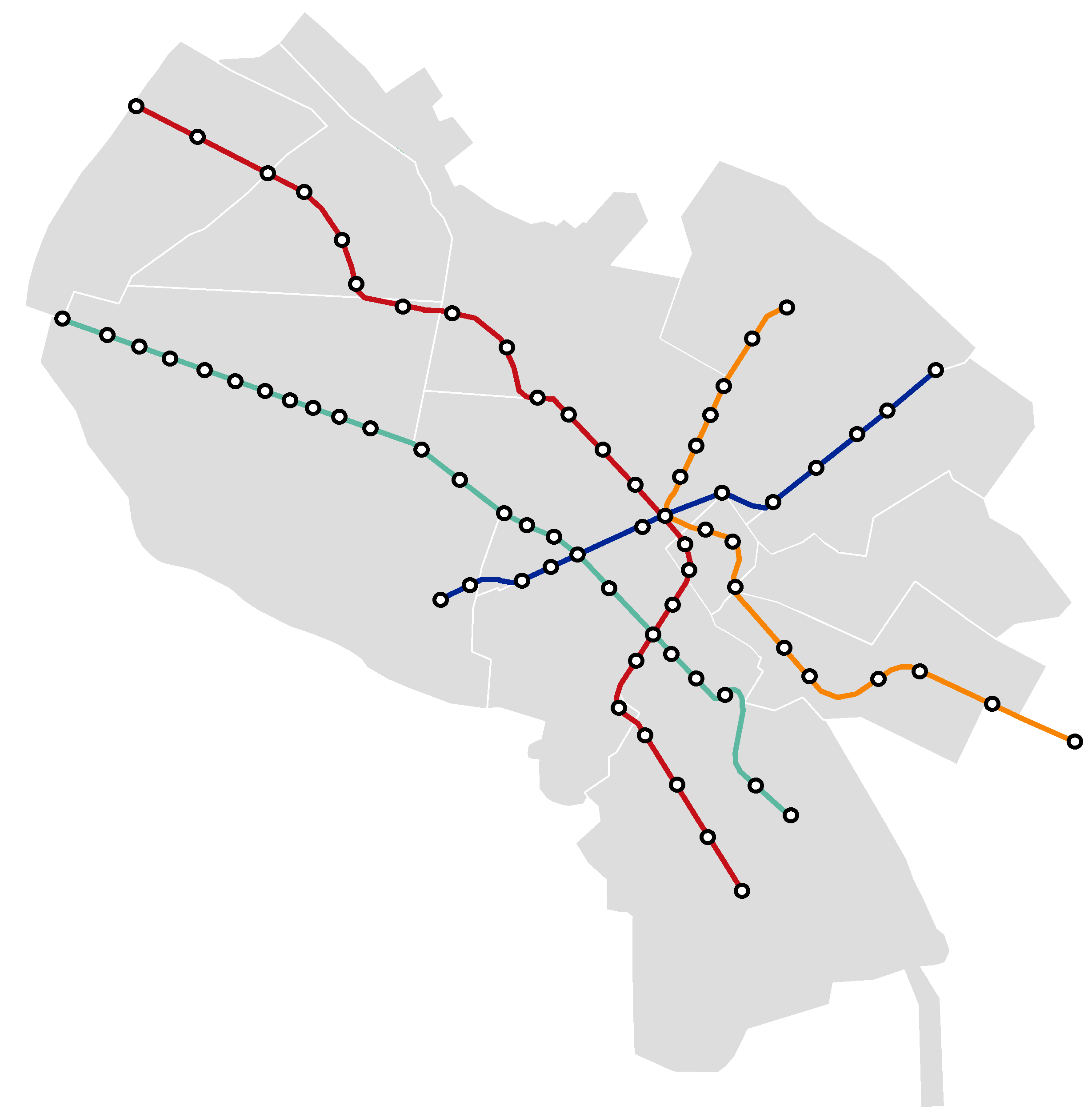
Future Plan of Mashhad Metro Lines

Line 3's construction began in 2015, with TBMs doing the excavation. By 2020, 8.5 km (5.3 mi) of tunnels had been excavated, with the full route expected to be 28.5 km (17.7 mi) long and serve 24 stations. The line's first phase entered partial operation on 8 May 2025, with an initial 3 station route between Shohada and Imam Reza Terminal.

=== Line 4 ===
Another additional line is planned. Line 4 with 17.5 km (10.9 mi) length has been approved and it will have 15 stations. Tunnel Excavation of Line 4 in Summer 2021 was started and is currently underway.

== Rolling stock ==
A fleet of 60 low-floor LRVs was ordered from Chinese Changchun Railway Vehicles for line 1. These mark the first time that light rail vehicles have been exported to a customer outside China.

A fleet of 100 metro trains has been ordered to CNR. 85 of them were assembled in Iran by TWM.
