= Railway electrification in Iran =

Tehran-Mashhad Railway Electrification (TMRE)
- Railway network in Iran 2020

Overview
- Status: Electrification started February 2012
- Owner: RAI
- Locale: Iran
- Termini: Tehran; Mashhad
- Stations: 49, train length 700 m (35 ch)

Service
- System: Electric railway
- Services: 80% passenger, 20% freight
- Rolling stock: 6 MW
- Daily ridership: 50 million pass. 12 million frgh

History
- Opened: 1957

Technical
- Line length: 926 double track, UIC 60, CWR 98%
- Track length: 2,200 km (1,367 mi)
- Number of tracks: 2 (4 track, 114 km tehran garmsar)
- Track gauge: 1,435 mm (4 ft 8 1/2 in) standard gauge
- Loading gauge: Axle Load = 22.5 ton
- Electrification: 25 kV AC 50 Hz
- Operating speed: 200 km/h (124 mph) pass. trains, 250 km/h (155 mph) tilting trains
- Highest elevation: 826–1,666 metres (2,710–5,466 ft)

Railway electrification in Iran describes the past and present electrification systems used to supply traction current to rail transport in Iran with a chronological record of development, a list of lines using each system, and a history and a technical description of each system.

The project is sometimes abbreviated to RAIELEC, in which RAI is the abbreviation of Islamic Republic of Iran Railways (Persian: برقی کردن راه آهن در ایران, abbr: بكرا).

== Early electrification: Tabriz-Jolfa ==
RC4
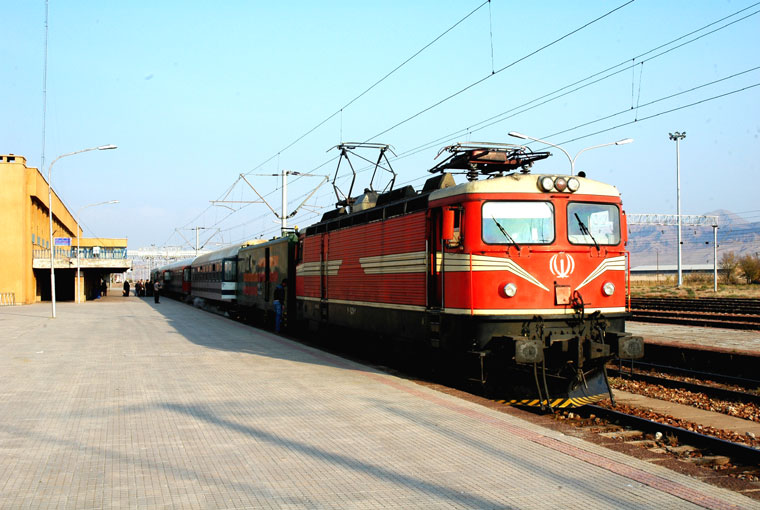
Type and origin
- Power type: Electric
- Builder: ASEA,
- Build date: 1979–1980
Specifications
- Configuration
  - AAR: B-B
  - UIC: Bo-Bo
- Gauge: 1,435 mm (4 ft 8 1/2 in) standard gauge
- Wheel diameter: 1,200 mm (3 ft 11 in)
- Wheelbase: 2,500 mm (8 ft 2 in)
- Length: 16,000 mm (52 ft 6 in)
- Width: 2,800 mm (9 ft 2 in)
- Height: 3,960 mm (13 ft 0 in)
- Loco weight: 80 metric tons (79 long tons; 88 short tons)
- Electric system/s: 25 kV AC catenary
- Current pickup: Pantograph
- Traction motors: DC
Performance figures
- Maximum speed: 100 km/h (62 mph)
- Power output: 3,600 kW (4,800 hp)
- Tractive effort: 240 kN (54,000 lb_{f})
Career
- Operators: RAI
- Number in class: 8
- Disposition: in service

After initial negotiations in 1969, railway electrification in Iran started in 1975, with a contract with USSR to electrify the Tabriz to Jolfa route in East Azarbaijan Province near the border with the former Soviet Union. The work would include a Bogie exchange facility. The Tabriz-Jolfa line was originally established in 1916 (before the main network in 1938) with the wide gauge 1,524 mm (5 ft) and was changed to standard gauge after connection of Tabriz to the national network. Tabriz-Jolfa is a single line rail track 146 km long with nine stations in between. The maximum grade is 2.8% and the minimum curve radius is 400m. The catenary voltage is 25 kV with booster transformer. Three substations exist: in Tabriz, Marand and Jolfa with 4 or 3 single phase transformers from Alstom each having 15 MW of capacity supplying the power.

The 8 locomotives used on this line with Bo-Bo configuration have been built by ASEA from Sweden based on RC4 type from SJ Rc family.

=== Electrification specification ===
The electric line voltage is 25 kV, 50 Hz, ( 25 kV AC railway electrification) with substations in Tabriz, Marand and Jolfa fed by 132 kV from the national grid. The end substations have three 15MW transformer and the Marand substation has four transformers.

Rank		Year	Orig.	Dest.	Dis.	Voltage, kV	power, MW	SS Dis., Km	Speed., Km/h	mast D., m	stagger len., m	pant. w., m	mast C., m	Height., m	Block l., m	Wire mm^2	Tens., Kn	Reg. brk.
1	Iran	1976	kampsax	standard		25	10-15		160	70	0.4	1.9	3.0	5-6	1500	107	10-12	
1	Iran	1985	Tabriz	Jolfa	146	25	15	70	100	50			3	5.2	1200	100	1500	0
2	Iran	1997	Tehran	Karaj	35	2^25	63	60	140	55			3.2	5.2	1200	120	1500	1
3	Iran	2010	Tabriz	Azarshahr	46	25	15		140	55			3.2	5.2	1200	100	1500	
4	Iran	2012	Tehran	Mashhad	926	2^25	50	90	250	68			3.5	6.2	1300	120	2000	1
4	Iran	2014	Tehran	Tabriz	630	2^25	25	90	250	68			3.5	6.2	1300	120	2000	1

=== Track specification ===
Track specifications in current and planned electrified lines in Iran are as follows:

Rank	Year	Orig.	Dest.	Dis.	Tunnel	Stations	D.T.%	T.C. Dis.	clear. Height	clear. Width	Train Length	Train Load	Axle load	Leaner Load	rail weight	Con. Weld	Min. Curve	Max. Grade	Max. Speed	Station Speed	Train control
1	1891	tabriz	jolfa	146	0.1	7	0		4.7	3	400	2000	20	6	46-60		400	28	100	60	
2	1956	Tehran	mashhad	926	0	49	100	4.75	5.7	3.5	750	3500	22.5	7	60	95%	700	15	250	80	ETCS 2
3	1928	Ahvaz	Tehran	62	816	45	20	4.5	4.7	3.1	420	2000	20	6.5	46-60	30	250	15	160	60	

=== Operational information ===
country	Year	Orig.	Dest.	Dis.	D.Track %	train cap.	Train Length	Train weight	passenger	freight	Pass. A.S.	frt. A.S.	T.P. demand	T.F. demand	Max. Speed	max P.C.	Max F.C.
Iran	1957	Tehran	Mashhad	926	100	60^2	750	3500	13	2	80	30	50	10	160	50	10
Iran	1993	Bafgh	Bandarabbas	630	75	30^2	1500	7000	2	10	90	35	4	60	160	5	100

== Recent projects ==
=== Pilot projects ===
Recently another contract was signed with the Russian railway RZD in February 2009 to connect the Tabriz electric line to Azarshahr to the south with a length of 46 km single track with 140 km/h speed that was inaugurated in 2012 Oct. 13th.

Continuing the line to Bonab and Maragheh and possibly to Urmia through the Shahid Kalantary bridge is planned. The bridge has the rail track integrated, like Oresund Bridge. The existing electric line could be connected to Oroumieh and Maragheh.

Also Shabestar and Salmas, relying on existing facilities and locomotives will be electrified. On the northern route it is planned to connect Soofian to Shabestar and Salmas.

=== Main project ===
A tender for electrification of the Tehran-Mashhad double track line, would supply 70 electric locomotives with cab signaling that will increase the speed to 200 km/h for passenger car trains and 250 km/h for tilting trains like Talgo.

Electric trains will reduce the existing journey time from 12 hours down to 6 hours and Multiple Train Units (EMUs) from existing 8 hours to less than 5 hours.

The line is equipped with Optical fiber communication and CTC center for railway signal. This project as well as electrification and locomotives, also includes SCADA, 5 years maintenance, and back up power generation. The contract includes dual mode vehicles for maintenance. A ceremonial construction start for the Tehran-Mashhad electrification took place on 1 February 2012. The completion is expected in 2014.

=== Second passenger projects ===
It is planned to expand electrification to the northwest up to the existing line at Tabriz (with 200 km/h speed for passenger trains and 250 for tilting EMU or trains like Railjet) that is part of Silk Road and the transit route from Almaty to Istanbul and Islamabad to Istanbul as one of main task and objectives of ECO Economic Cooperation Organization and one of the emphasized routes of ESCAP United Nations Economic and Social Commission for Asia and the Pacific.

The first phase of this project will be from Tehran to Zanjan to make it more economic and also to prepare the new under construction includes straightening the route from Tabriz to Mianeh that will decrease the distance from Tehran to Tabriz about 100 km and for this stepwise plan dual mode or Electro-diesel locomotive could help justifying the project.

Recent inauguration of a 4 track 'cut and cover' 9 km railway line in Tehran west railway to Tabriz has made the project more feasible.

In the beginning of 2012, a 5-member consortium was formed and proposed to do the project as BOT base.

== Effects on stations ==
The layout of stations in Iran such as Tehran and Mashhad train stations will be affected by electrification. The railway platform in other stations could be extended in the future.

== Locomotive ==
=== Existing Electric locomotives ===
The locomotives in Tabriz-Jolfa has been built by ASEA based on Sweden type RC4 from SJ Rc family with 3600 KW and 100 km/h. Eight units are in operation.

The locomotives in Tehran-Karaj metro is TM1, TM2, TM3 similar to SS8 with 3200 KW and 140 km/h from Zhuzhou Electric Locomotive Works, China, counting for 56 units.

=== New locomotive specification ===
Passenger locomotives (type Bo′Bo′ according to UIC classification of locomotive axle arrangements) shall provide a continuous tractive effort of more than 240 kN, freight locomotives (Co′Co′) more than 480 kN and all weather adhesion shall be at least 33%. Passenger locomotives shall be equipped to provide head end power (HEP) to the train.

The locomotive prototype shall be available 6 months before inauguration to allow for the homologation phase. A mockup and pilot experiment for EMUs could be used to expedite the accepting process.

=== Common platform locomotive ===
One of the major bottleneck to start operation of an electrified line in countries like Iran with rare electric track is to use the concept of a Common platform locomotive like TRAXX from Bombardier that makes the supply phase faster and more cost effective. This capability has been considered in Iranian Railways AD43C that is originally diesel electric but can be converted to electric locomotive. This capability has not been considered in IranRunner.

=== Dual mode locomotive ===
Another solution is using dual mode locomotives for stepwise electrification. Electro-diesel locomotive

=== Locomotive approval test ===
The locomotive test and approval, homologation would be done according to RAI, UIC, AAR, TTCI Transportation Technology Center and like SNCF Class BB 75000.

== Tendering process ==
The initial study was done by RAI vice president for planning and international affairs in 2003 specially by calculating the benefit of electrification in locomotive saving in long passenger trains that was argued by the railway research center MATRAI. After convincing the top managers and management and planning organization (MPO), it was approved by the government to make a feasibility study for electrification and this was accepted by the parliament in 2007.

The study was carried out by a joint of Metra and Italferr according to United Nations Industrial Development Organization (UNIDO) and FIDIC recommendations and Tehran—Mashhad was assigned as the first priority for being electrified. After this phase the tendering pre-qualification was prepared by a new joint venture of Metra and Systra and the request for proposal (RFP) was released with conceptual design and by result obligations.

== Electrification history ==
Although railway electrification in Iran was started in 1975 it grounded down to a halt and stayed so 30 years. A contract for electrification of the Tehran-Mashhad double-track line and the supply of 70 electric locomotives was awarded in 2009. Speeds of up to 200 km/h for locomotive-hauled passenger trains and 250 km/h for tilting EMUs will reduce existing journey times of 7.5 to 12 to less than 5 hours.

== Tehran Metro line 5 ==
One of the Electric railways in Iran is Line 5 of metro that uses 25 KV OCS and is operated by Tehran Metro.

On 7 March 1999, an overland Tehran-Karaj express electric train started a limited service of 31.4 km between Azadi Square (Tehran) and Malard (Karaj) calling at one intermediate station at Vardavard. The line was constructed by the Chinese company NORINCO.

Double-deck passenger cars for the Tehran-Karaj commuter line are supplied by CNTIC and assembled by the Wagon Pars factory in Arak.

Locomotives of this line is similar to SS8 and has been supplied by CSR Zhuzhou Electric Locomotive Works

=== Electrification projects ===
A brief study was done to prepare a Comprehensive planning for electrification development in RAI.

Route	Length	traffic 2011	fuel saving	Date	Max. speed
origin-destination	km	million	million liter	year	km/h
Tehran-Mashhad	926	20 pass. +5 frt.	250	2012	250
Tehran-Bandarabbas	1350	10 pass. + 60 frt.	4000	2014	160
Tehran-Tabriz	600	20 pass. + 5 frt.	100	2014	250
Chadormaloo-Ardakan	220	1pass. + 10frt.	100	2011	120

== Proposals ==
=== Comprehensive Transport Study of Iran ===
Parallel to the dynamic and flexible policies of the Islamic Republic of Iran regarding socio-economic development plan, Comprehensive Transportation Studies of Iran Comprehensive Transportation Studies of Iran (CTSI), has been implemented to design an optimum and multilateral transportation system best in order to satisfy economical and secure movement of goods and passengers. The overall target of this plan is to prepare a program including reports and studies that comprises the main strategies for leading the Islamic Republic of Iran's transportation system as well as determining the priorities of allocating resources by considering the existing policies, criteria, necessities and priorities. Hence, the CTSI project is planned for achieving an optimum transportation system based on betterment of current situation and presenting investment priorities of transportation infrastructures in a twenty-year outlook in order to provide means for economical and secure movement of goods and passengers with a constant view to economic, social and cultural development plan policies of country.

== Freight projects ==
On the freight corridor, the electrification of Bafgh—Bandarabbas in Persian Gulf is planned as a Build-Operate-Transfer project with future continuation to Tehran and Intermodal freight transport at both ends (like Betuweroute) plus a Classification yard.

Bandar Abbas is close to Gheshm Island that has 100 km length and could be connected by bridge. This line might also transport oil.

Iron ore is one of the main commodities on this line, especially from Golgohar mine near Sirjan, Choghart and Chadormaloo near Bafq to Isfahan for two steel plants and steel mills named Zobahan (Esfahan Steel Company) and Mobarakeh.

As the rail connection with Zahedan will be inaugurated in near future, it will make it possible to have a direct transit line from Central Asia to Pakistan and India possibly with variable gauge bogies and could be completed with a link to Chabahar port in the south east of the country.

The business plan to justify the electrification and supplying locomotives is going to be prepared.

=== Electrification investment ===
Transport demand is increased more than GDP in freight and less than it in passenger sector, and it is essential to provide appropriate means for transport by investing in infrastructures. Multiple structures have been considered, including BOT similar to Taiwan High Speed Rail as a Public-private partnership(PPP) type investment. as well as high speed trains investment to buy AGV by Italian company Nuovo Trasporto Viaggiatori(NTV).

Transit-oriented development(TOD) is also an approach that could be used mainly from urban areas in railway stations.

Pacific Railroad Acts is a good benchmark for encouraging private sector for investment in railway network expansion programs.

=== Effects of electrification on stations ===
Electrification causes increased capacity of railway so the Railway station layout changes accordingly. some of Railway stations in Iran are suitable for electrification, specially those that have been constructed after the Islamic revolution.

=== External cost ===
The external cost of railway is lower than other modes of transport but the electrification brings down it even more, if it is sustainable.

This is specially due to railway safety relative to Road traffic safety, considering the Value of life. Also energy from well to wheel, and the necessity to reduce pollutions and greenhouse gas in earth according to the Kyoto Protocol. The new approach to manage the CO_{2} is carbon credit.

=== Electrification effect on CDM ===
One of the results of electrification is Clean Development Mechanism, for carbon dioxide reduction. The Clean Development Mechanism (CDM) is one of the flexibility mechanisms defined in the Kyoto Protocol

=== Electrification effect on TOD ===
Transit Oriented Development or TOD is one of major concepts that has been considered to promote the presence of railway, Metro and other modes of city transport in through increasing the interaction of transit by hoteling, marketing, services, housing.

=== Electrification standards ===
Some of main UIC standards in railway electrification are:

UIC 791–1, Maintenance guidelines for overhead contact lines

UIC 799, Characteristics of a.c. overhead contact systems for high-speed lines worked at speeds of over 200 km/h

And European union codes like:

En-50119, Cenelec standard Railway Electric Traction Contact-Lines

EN 15227 about the Crashworthiness requirements for railway vehicle bodies

IEC 61133- Rules for testing of electric locomotive

The first electrification standard for Iran was prepared by Kampsax(COWI) in 1977 as part of a general standard.

=== Electrification industries ===
IDRO Industrial Development and Renovation Organization of Iran as a developing organization is responsible to develop the industry sector and to accelerate the industrialization process of the country. It has become one of the largest Iranian holding company/conglomerate (company) in recent years.

Iranian railway industry are either belonging to IDRO or private sector and the electrification industries among them are like: Tam (irankhodro), Sanam, Irantransfo.

=== Electrification consultants ===
Because of short history of railway electrification and suburb metro with 25 kV there are not so many consultants for this in Iran, but some of them are METRA, Imer, Moshanir, Harazrah, Iranoston, Araco(Azarakhsh rail Aria).

=== Electrification railway Maps ===
Some of suitable railway map sources with infrastructure and speed classification as well as topographic contours are given different sources.

=== Electrification cost ===
The Electrification cost as part of railway prices and costs depends on the speed or the class of the track like Speed limits in the United States (rail). In 1984 the world bank's Railways and Energy report provided estimates of typical costs.

According to the book of Prices and Costs in the railway sector by Professor Baumgartner from Switzerland the rough estimation of traction substation cost is 0.2 million euro per megavolt amper and 0.2 million euro per km of line with 300 km/h and 0.15 for 100 km/h.

=== Import Tariff ===
Tariff of electrification equipment in Iran is 5% for locomotive and machineries.

=== Electrification Right-of-way ===
Right-of-way in railway in Iran is 35m but with electrification needs to be increased for higher speed and safety reasons.

=== Railway Electrification Education ===
For higher education, it is considered to have MS level in railway faculty in IRAN University of science and technology.

== See also ==
- Islamic Republic of Iran Railways
- Matrai
- Trans-Iranian Railway
- History of rail transport in Iran
- Economic Cooperation Organization
- United Nations Economic and Social Commission for Asia and the Pacific
