= EMD G12 =

Locomotive class

EMD G12 series
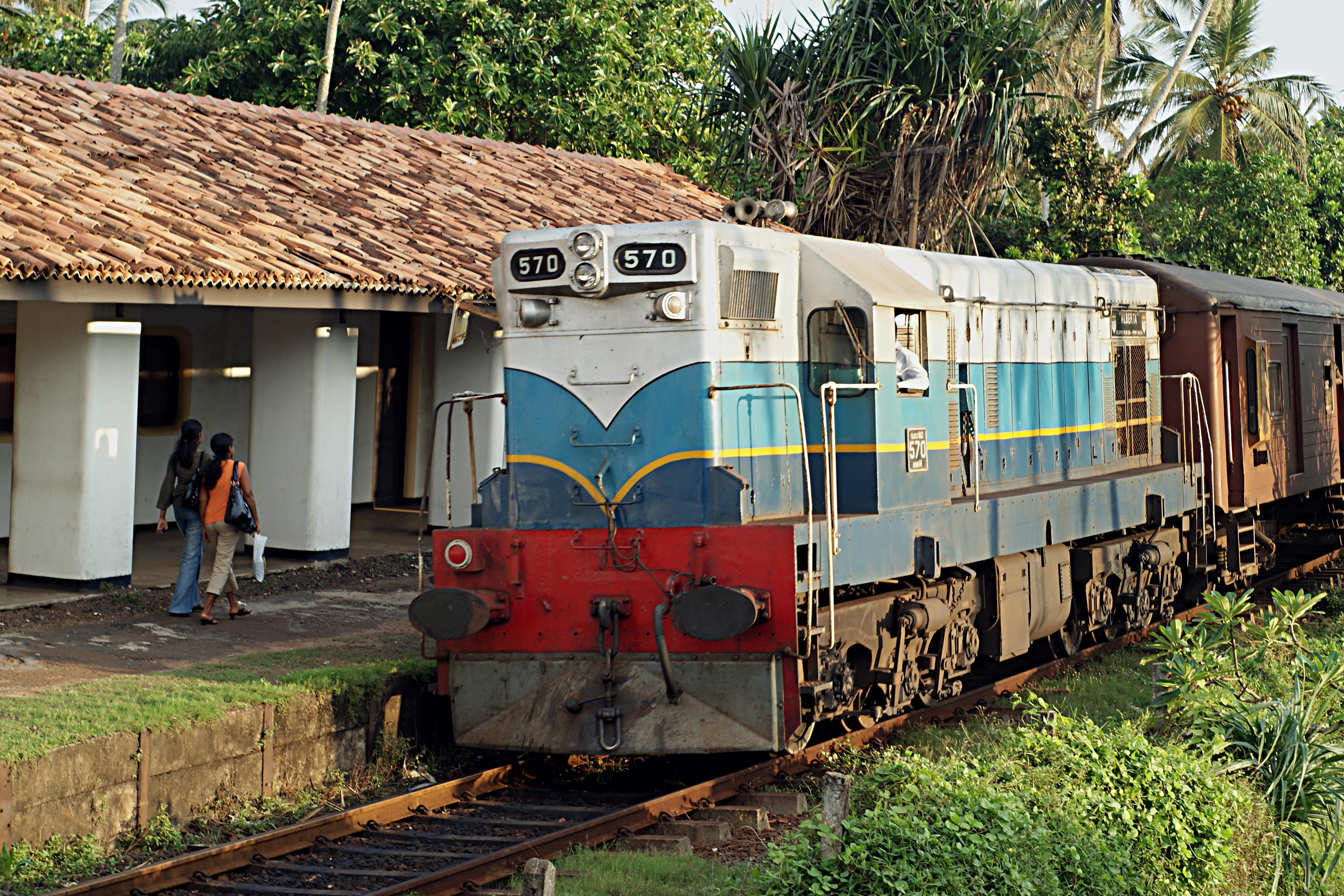
- Class M2 570 – Alberta in Sri Lanka
Type and origin
- Power type: Diesel–electric
- Builder: General Motors Electro-Motive Division (USA), General Motors Diesel (Canada); Clyde Engineering (Australia)
- Model: G12
- Build date: 1953–1968
- Total produced: B-B version: 673; A1A-A1A version: 317; C-C version: 217
Specifications
- Configuration
  - AAR: B-B, A1A-A1A and C-C
- Gauge: 1,000 mm (3 ft 3 3/8 in); 3 ft 6 in (1,067 mm); 4 ft 8 1/2 in (1,435 mm); 5 ft 3 in (1,600 mm); 5 ft 6 in (1,676 mm)
- Loco weight: 107 long tons (109 t; 120 short tons)
- Fuel capacity: 2,840 litres (750 US gal; 620 imp gal)
- Prime mover: EMD 12-567C
- Engine type: two-stroke V12 diesel
- Cylinders: 12
- Cylinder size: 8.5 in × 10 in (216 mm × 254 mm)
- Transmission: Electric
Performance figures
- Power output: 1,310 or 1,425 bhp (977 or 1,063 kW)
- Tractive effort: 19,100 kg_{f} (187.3 kN; 42,108.3 lbf)
Career
- Disposition: Most scrapped, many preserved, some still in service

The EMD G12 is a class of export locomotive built by GM-EMD, and its Canadian affiliate General Motors Diesel. In addition, Australian licensee Clyde Engineering built ten locomotives for New Zealand in 1957, five for Hong Kong, 23 for Queensland, fourteen for Western Australia and seven for BHP. Australian licensee Commonwealth Engineering also built 42 for Queensland Rail in 1964–1966. Many examples were built in the 1950-1960s for railroads around the world.

They are powered by EMD 12-567C prime movers rated at 1,250 hp (930 kW); some have been rebuilt with EMD 645 engines. The A1A-A1A and C-C versions had a lower axle loading than the B-B version.

== Original Owners ==
=== B-B version ===
==== Australia ====
- 7 BHP Whyalla DE class

==== Brazil ====
A total of 241 locomotives:

- 2 Estrada de Ferro de Goiás 5201–5202
- 30 Mogiana Railway 3001–3030
- 43 Estrada de Ferro Noroeste do Brasil 1101–1143
- 17 Rede de Viação Paraná-Santa Catarina 1321–1337
- 18 Companhia Paulista de Estradas de Ferro 700–717
- 25 Rede Mineira de Viação 2201–2207, 2211–2228
- 71 Viação Férrea do Rio Grande do Sul 2121–2145, 2161–2168, 6169–6206
- 35 Estrada de Ferro Vitória a Minas 531–565

==== Canada ====
- 2 London & Port Stanley Railway L4, L5
- 1 General Motors Diesel demonstrator 7707 (to Sweden as Statens Järnvägar T42 in service between 1956 and 1983 preserved by the Swedish State Railroad Museum and is still in running order.)

==== Chile ====
- 3 Andes Copper Mining 81–83, currently on service by Ferronor.

==== Egypt ====
- 97 Egyptian Railways 3701–3797. During the 1967 Six-Day War, Israel captured 3712, 3715, 3766 and 3795, which were appropriated to Israel Railways stock.

==== Israel ====
- 23 Israel Railways 104–126, some since rebuilt with 12-645E engines. After the 1967 Six-Day War, four captured Egyptian G12s were renumbered 127–130.

==== Iran ====
- 137 Islamic Republic of Iran Railways 40.01–40.137
- Driver cab of most of the active units have been changed to full view like GT26.
- Railway Research Center (MATRAI) has converted one of G12 loco to Hybrid locomotive in 2001 with AC drive.

==== Hong Kong ====
- 5 Kowloon-Canton Railway Corporation No. 51–55
  - Built by Clyde Engineering in Sydney, Australia in 1955 (51 and 52) and 1957 (53–55).
  - 51 Sir Alexander, named after by-then governor of Hong Kong in 1955, Alexander Grantham, was retired in 1997 and donated and preserved in Hong Kong Railway Museum in 2004.
  - 52–55 were retired in June 2004 (however 55 did see limited shunting use for a short while) and re-sold to Chicago Freight Car Leasing Australia in October 2005, arriving that December and reentering service in late 2006-early 2007 as TL152–TL155. Before being loaded on the ship to Australia, the locomotives had their nameplates removed and KCR logos painted over.
    - TL152 (originally 52 Lady Maurine) sold to K&AB Rail c. 2014, to SCT 2020, now used as shunter at the Wimmera Intermodal Freight Terminal at Dooen.
    - TL153 (originally 53 H.P. Winslow) sold to the Dalby Machinery Centre in Dalby, west of Toowoomba in Queensland, as a static exhibit. On display at the entrance to the centre.
    - TL154 (originally 54 R. Baker) owned by ALARC, stored at Tailem Bend. No longer operable due to copper thieves, used as source of spare parts for TL155.
    - TL155 (originally 55 R.D. Walker) owned by ALARC. Restored in 2020, hired out to SCT.
  - The names of the locomotives were originally painted on the valance underneath the long hood catwalks, however they were replaced with cast nameplates in the late 1980s. All locomotives apart from 51 lost their names when sold to CFCLA.
  - 51 and 52 were built with Clyde's stock buffers-and-chain couplers, as well as the number board/headlight fixture flush with the top of the hoods. These were replaced with automatic couplers sometime after arrival in Hong Kong. 53 to 55 were built with slightly lowered number board fixtures.
  - In 1996, the locomotives were heavily modified, with large air conditioning units mounted to the cab, diesel generators installed in the No. 2 end to power them (which involved slightly lengthening the long end hood under the number boards) and full-length handrails. These modifications were retained on 51 at preservation (minus the air conditioner), to illustrate the changes the locomotives had gone through during service in Hong Kong. Further modifications made to the locomotives in CFCLA service included installation of reinforced side windows, slightly widening the steps on the front left and rear right sides of the units and adding an extra rung to the modified steps. The original Hong Kong air conditioners had been removed when retired from KCR service, but new, smaller ones were fitted by CFCLA. The locomotives had the stock EMD exhaust pipes replaced with larger twin exhausts in the 1950s after arrival in Hong Kong, which were replaced with box-like exhaust silencers in the 1980s.
- As delivered, the locomotives wore a green livery, with a silver upper section and the numbers painted on the cabsides and ends. In the 1980s, this was changed to a grey livery, with the cabside numbers relocated to the hood sides and replaced with a KCR logo, but retaining the silver upper section. In 1996, 54 was painted in a blue livery with green valances. 52, 53 and 55 would soon after be repainted in a red livery with blue valances, which all other operating KCR diesels were soon repainted into. 51 did not receive this livery, and in 2003 was repainted into a rough approximation of its original livery based on the 1980s livery.

==== Mexico ====
- 84 Ferrocarriles Nacionales de México 5806–5889

==== Netherlands ====
- 5 Dutch State Mines SM 151-155 (Built in 1956-1959 under license as Henschel G12 in Germany). In 1970 sold to the Nederlandse Spoorwegen as series NS 2901–2905. In 1975 sold to Ferrocarriles de Vía Estrecha in Spain.

==== South Korea ====
- 25 Korean National Railways 4001–4015(From 4011 to 4015, the gear ratio was changed to change the speed to reach 153 km/h (95 mph), and the numbers were revised to 4301 to 4305), 4101–4110

==== Nigeria ====
- 25 Nigerian Railways 1101–1125

==== Norway ====
- 2 Sydvaranger 1, DE101 – G12 (used on the Kirkenes–Bjørnevatn Line, 1954–97)

==== Sri Lanka ====
- 2 Sri Lanka Railways Class M2C 626–627 (Before 2010 it used only for upcountry between Rathmalana, Colombo- Kandy, Badulla.)

==== Sweden ====
- 1 locomotive bought by SJ in 1956, named at first T5, later T42. It was built by GM for sales demo in Europe, and SJ bought it afterwards. Now placed at the Swedish Railway Museum.

==== Venezuela ====
- 3 Government Coal Mines 01–03

=== A1A-A1A version ===
==== Argentina ====
- 25 Sarmiento Railway 4501–4525, later 6551–6575.

==== Australia ====
- 13 Queensland Rail 1400 class

==== Brazil ====
A total of 26 locomotives:

- 6 Rede Mineira de Viação 2708–2712
- 20 Viação Férrea do Rio Grande do Sul 2101–2120

==== Indonesia ====
- 11 Indonesian State Railways BB201 01–BB201 11

==== Mexico ====
- 6 Ferrocarriles Nacionales de México 5800–5805

==== New Zealand ====
- 146 New Zealand DA class locomotive 1400–1545

==== Sri Lanka ====
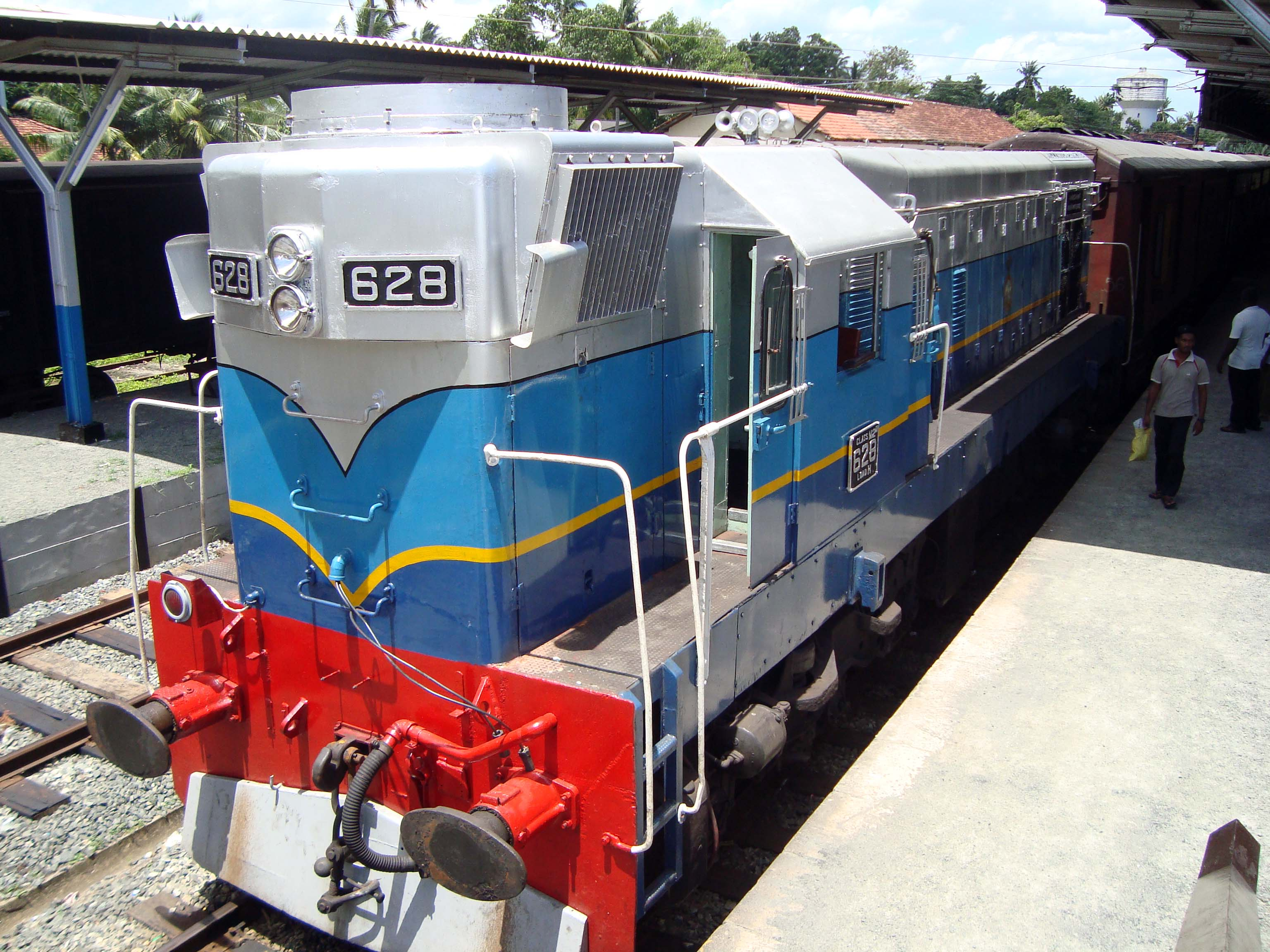
Sri Lanka Railways Class M2D 628

- 12 Sri Lanka Railways. All except M2 571 still in daily operation (1). Classified as Class M2
  - Class M2 569–573; One locomotive (M2 571) destroyed by terrorism.
  - Class M2A 591–593; 591 damaged by 2004 Indian Ocean Tsunami and later rebuilt
  - Class M2B 594–595
  - Class M2D 628–629

==== Taiwan ====
- 52 Taiwan Railway R21–R72; some of their engines were replaced to 12-645E. R56–59: sent to Malawi Railways in July 2006.

==== United States ====
- 1 Electro-Motive Division demonstrator 1956

=== C-C version ===
==== Argentina ====
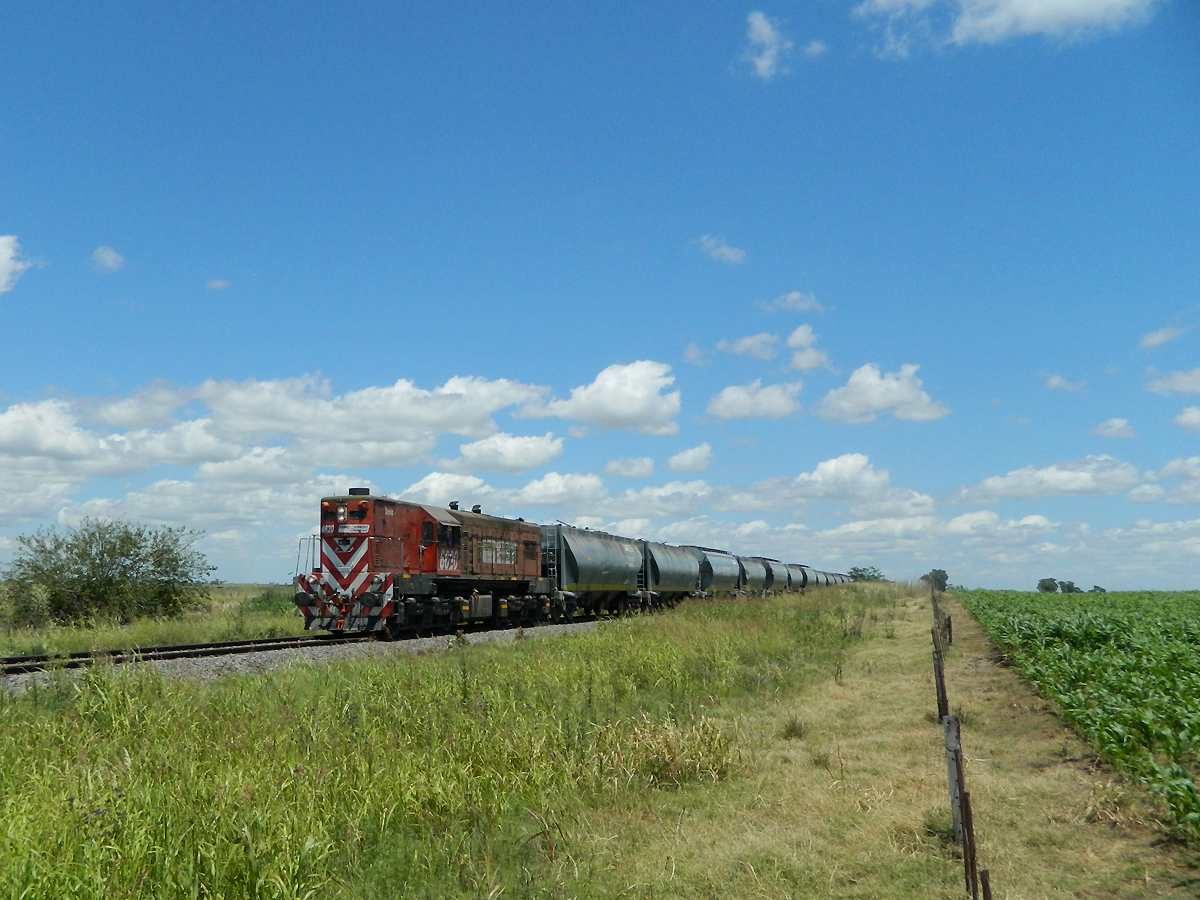
A Ferroexpreso Pampeano EMD GR12 on the Sarmiento Railway.

- 60 Sarmiento Railway as model GR12, initially 6576–6635 but later some were renumbered.

==== Australia ====
A total of 66 locomotives:

- 10 Queensland Rail 1450 class
- 42 Queensland Rail 1460 class (later on-sold to Tranz Rail and converted to DQ class locomotives for use in New Zealand and Tasmania).
- 14 Western Australian Government Railways A class

==== Chile ====
A total of 41 locomotives:

- 3 Andes Copper Mining Co GR12, 91–93
- 3 Chile Iron Mines GR12, 5–7
- 19 Chilean State Railways GR12, Dt13.01–Dt13.19
- 6 Cia De Acero Del Pacifico GR12, 701–706
- 10 FC AyB GR12, 1400–1409

==== Colombia ====
A total of 27 locomotives:

- 27 National Railways of Colombia GR12, 401–427

==== Liberia ====
A total of 7 locomotives:

- 7 National Iron Ore GR12, 21–27

==== Peru ====
A total of 7 locomotives:

- 7 Cerro De Pasco GR12, 31–37

==== S Africa ====
A total of 3 locomotives:

- 3 S African Iron Steel GR12, D31–D33

==== Tunisia ====
A total of 6 locomotives:

- 6 Sfax-Gafsa Railway GR12, 501–506

== Preservation ==
KORAIL 4102 is the only preserved G12 in Korea, plinthed in front of Daejeon MPD, alongside a single SD9 5025. Both engines worked for the construction of KTX's Gyeongbu section as departmental vehicles upon the retirement of KORAIL.

A former Australian-built KCRC G12 is preserved in the Hong Kong Railway Museum.

== Gallery ==
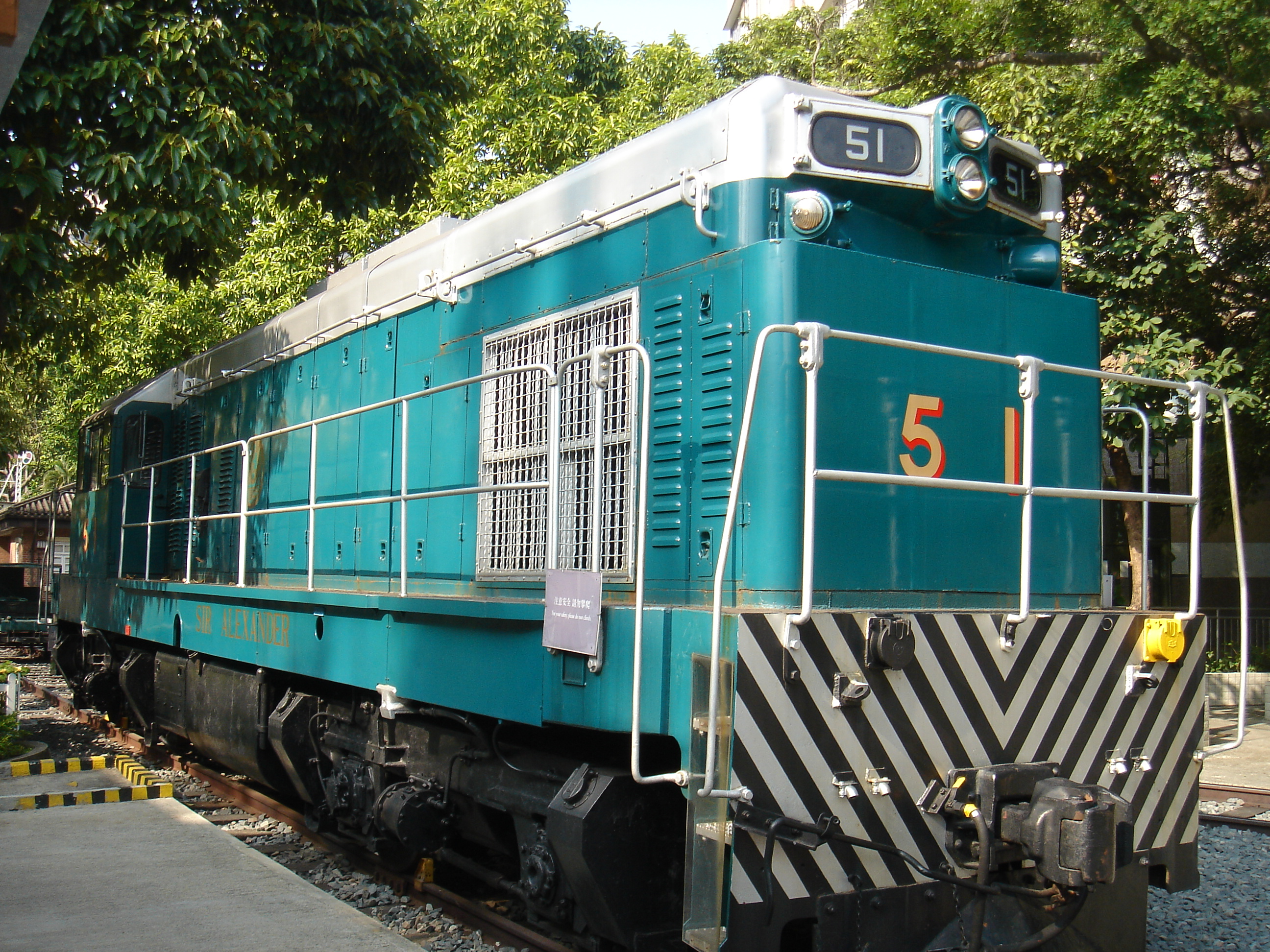
Kowloon-Canton Railway Corporation 51 at the Hong Kong Railway Museum in November 2005

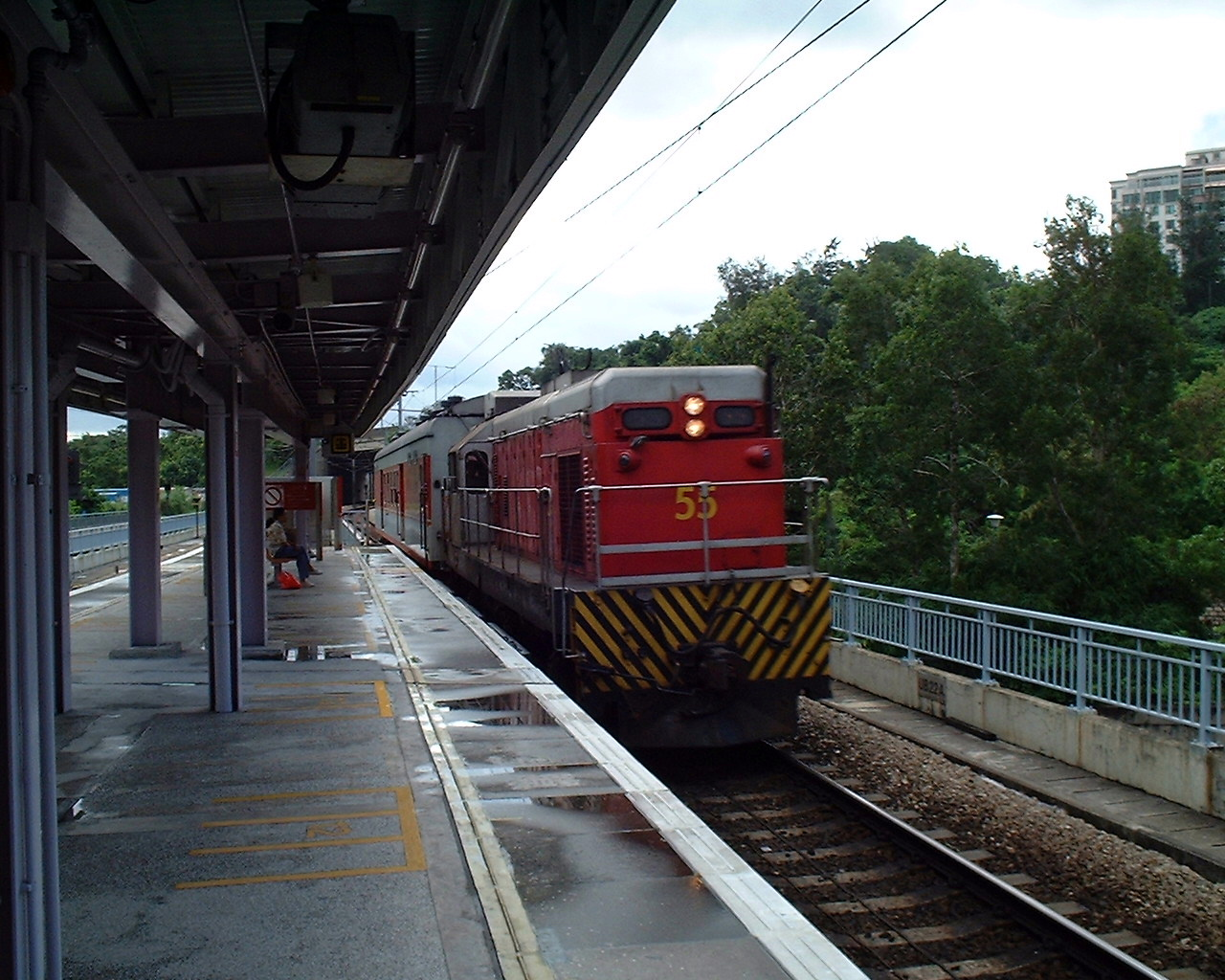
KCRC EMD G12, No.55 (R. D. Walker), at Tai Po Market Station, Hong Kong, June 2000.

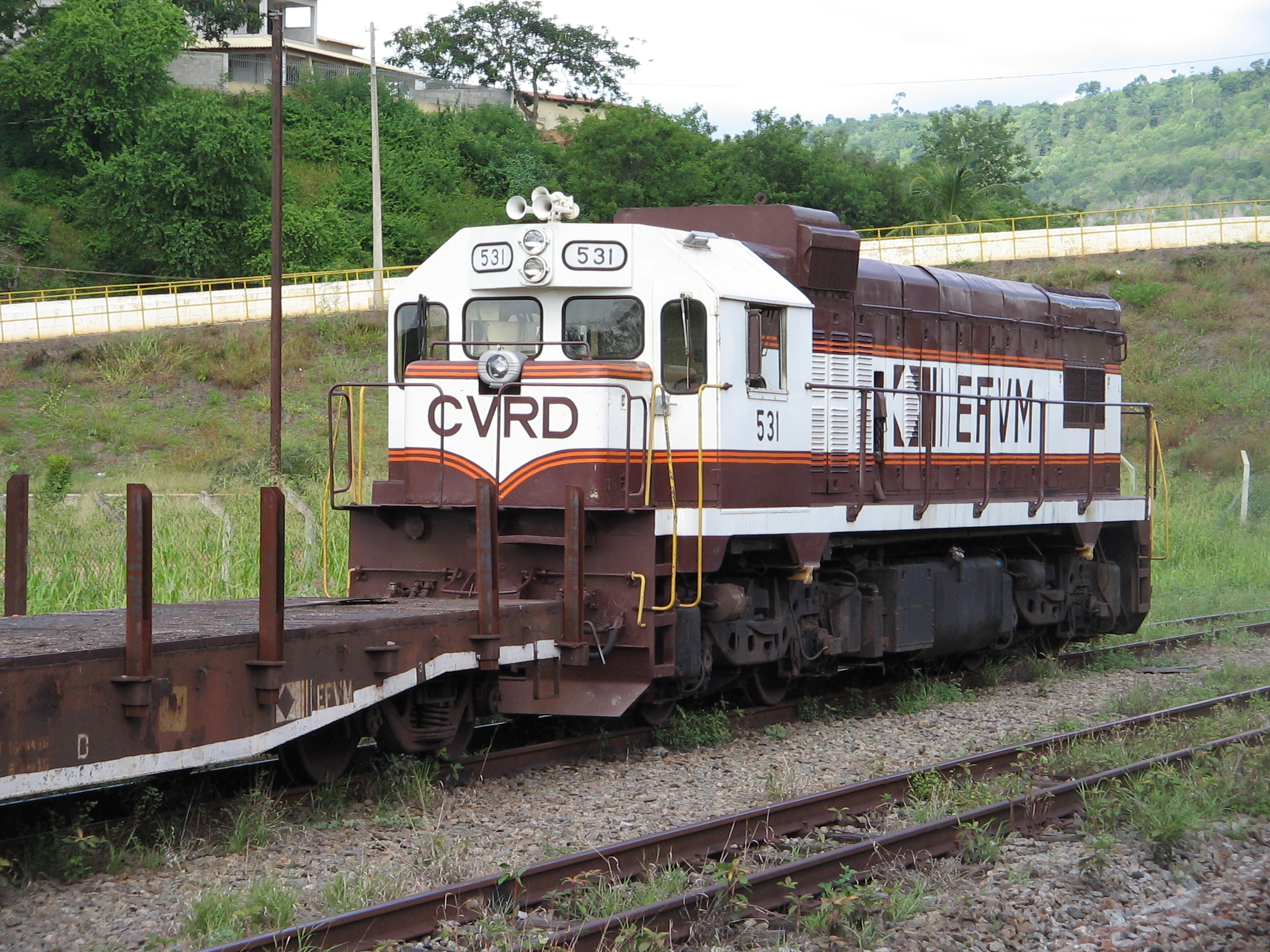
Estrada de Ferro Vitória a Minas (EFVM) 531, a G12 built by EMD (serial number 21936 of 1956) photographed at Aimorés station, Aimorés, MG, Brasil, March 2008.

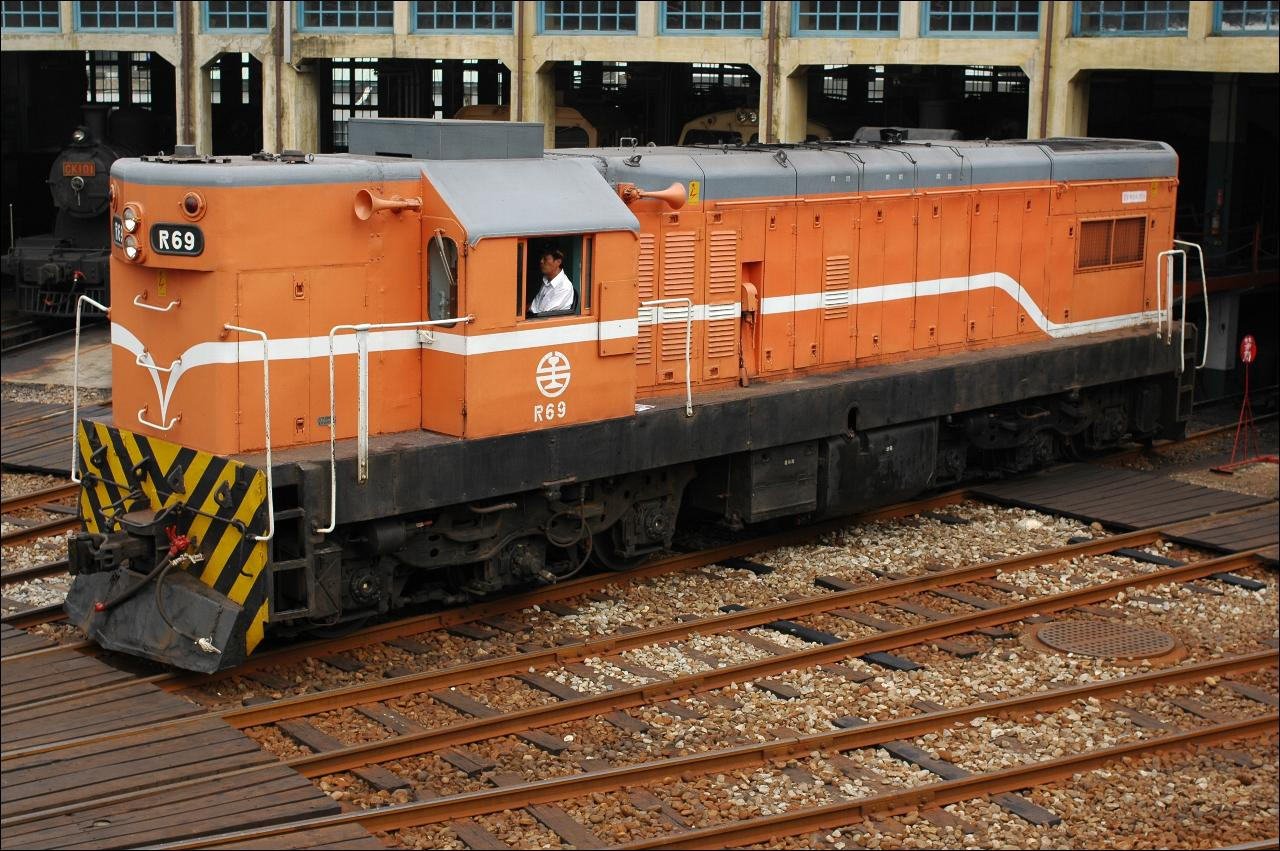
Taiwan Railway Administration R69 at Changhua Roundhouse.

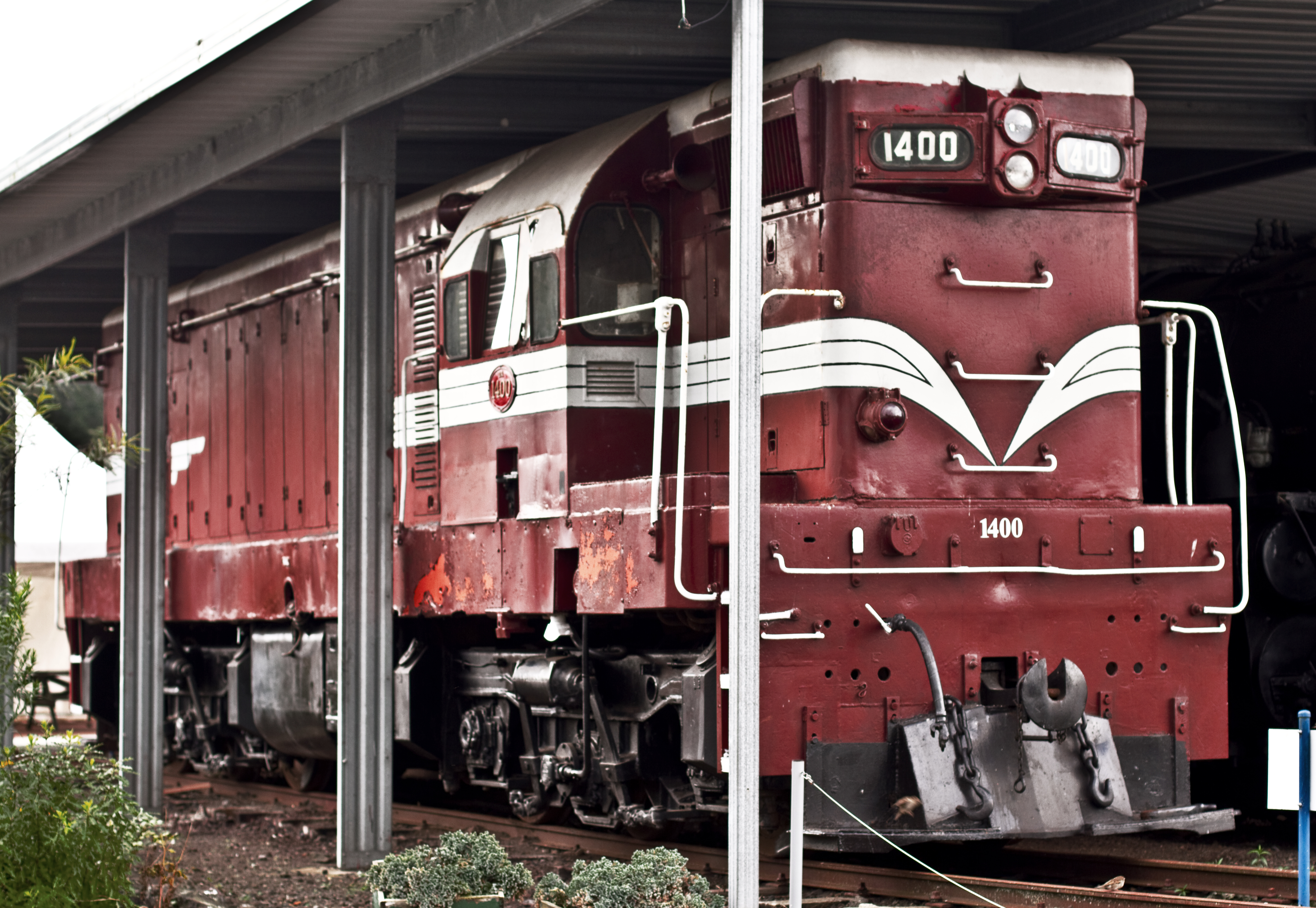
Preserved DA 1400 at Auckland's Museum of Transport & Technology.

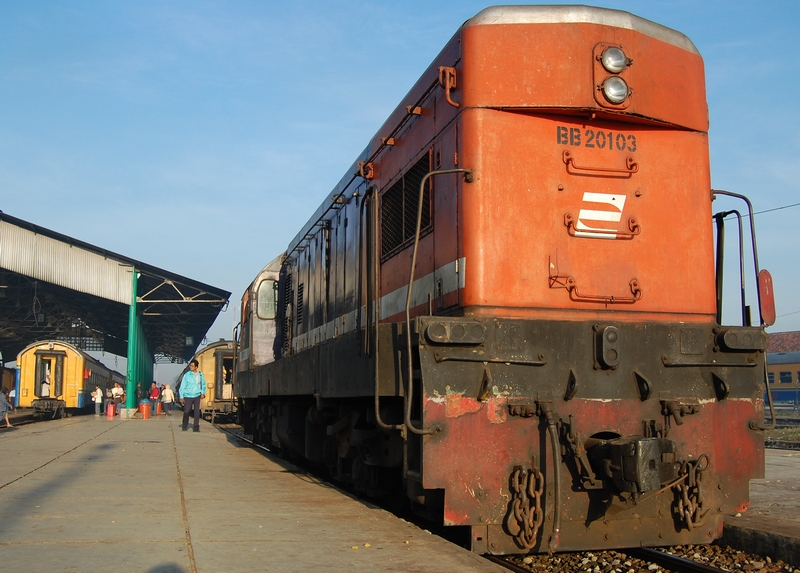
An Indonesian BB201 Locomotive at Kroya station

== See also ==
- List of GM-EMD locomotives
- List of GMD Locomotives
