= Class 2900 =

Class 2900 or 2900 class may refer to:

- Bangladesh Railway Class 2900, a diesel-electric locomotive
- GWR 2900 Class, a UK steam locomotive
- NS Class 2900 (1956), a Dutch diesel locomotive
- NS Class 2900 (Sprinter), a Dutch electric multiple-unit train
- IÉ 29000 Class, an Irish diesel multiple unit
- Santa Fe Class 2900, a US steam locomotive
