= History of rail transport in Iran =

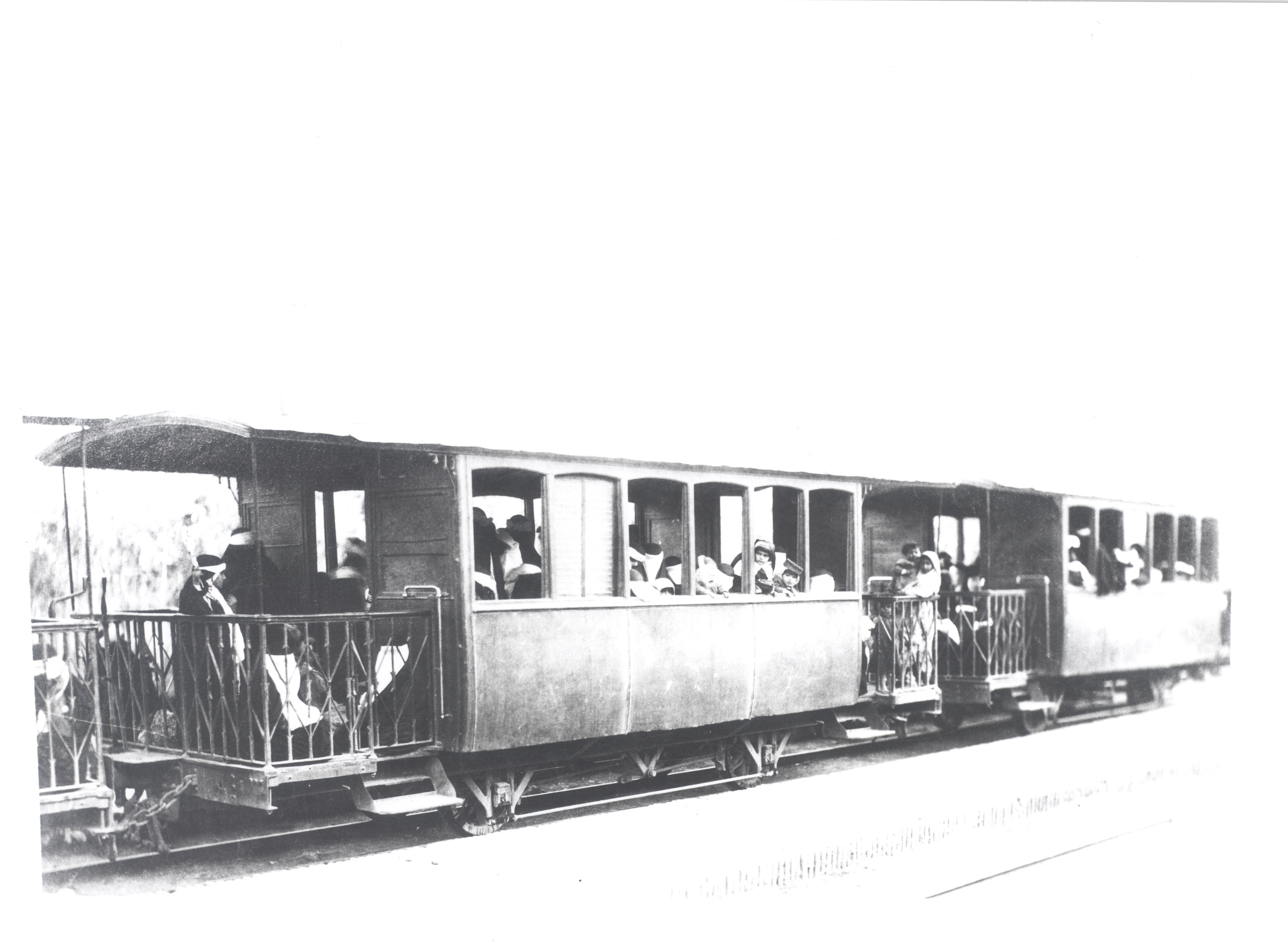
Photograph of a Qajar era train car, Golestan Palace albums

In the second half of the 19th century, during the reign of Naser al-Din Shah Qajar, a short horse-driven suburban railway was established south of Tehran that was later converted to steam. This line was closed in 1952.

The Tabriz–Jolfa–Julfa (Russia) line (146 km) was opened in 1915 (in 1916 official opening), the Sufian–Sharafkhaneh (53 km) in 1916, and the Mirjaveh–Zahedan (93 km) in 1920. In 1915–1918, the Russians built and operated a military narrow-gauge railway Shakhtakhty (Russia) - Maku (Iran)- Bayazed (Turkey).

== World War II ==
The 1,392 km (865 mi) long Trans-Iranian Railway from Bandar Shah on the Caspian Sea to Bandar Shahpur on the Persian Gulf was opened during the reign of Reza Shah Pahlavi in 1939. The railroad was built with rail weighing 67 pounds per yard (33 kg/m) and required more than 3000 bridges. There were 126 tunnels in the Zagros mountains. The longest was 1.5 miles. Grades averaged 1.5 percent south of Tehran, but then increased to 2.8 percent to cross the 7,270-foot pass between Tehran and the Caspian Sea. Following the Anglo-Soviet invasion of Iran in 1941, this Persian Corridor became one of the supply routes for war material for the Soviet Union during World War II. The British built a 75-mile (121 km) branch line from the 3000-foot (900-meter) bridge over the Karun river in Ahvaz to a new southern port at Khorramshahr on the Shatt al-Arab river. In 1943, 3,473 American soldiers of the Military Railway Service began running trains between the Persian Gulf and Caspian Sea using ALCO RS-1 locomotives rebuilt with 3-axle trucks and designated RSD-1. The Americans set up headquarters in Ahvaz, but were unable to tolerate the daytime heat, and generally operated the railway at night.

== Before the Islamic revolution ==
After the transportation minister visited a Japanese new high speed railway in 1975 he invited them to study a new high speed line between Tehran and Mashhad. a delegation came to Iran for this study and their proposal was prepared with three options:

1- Double tracking, signaling and electrification of existing route with 160 km/h speed.

2- Constructing a new dedicated high speed line with 210 km/h like japan as the second country in the world.

3- Constructing a new dedicated high speed line with 270 km/h that was more than Japanese one.

and for the third one they explained the 10 year duration of project that was enough to develop the new generation of high speed trains.

== Challenging construction ==
The Trans-Iranian railway traverses many mountain ranges, and is full of spirals and 1 in 36 ruling grades. Much of the terrain was unmapped when construction took place, and its geology unknown. Several stretches of line, including tunnels, were built through unsuitable geology, and had to be replaced even before the line opened. Nevertheless, the line was completed ahead of schedule.

In recent years the railways have undergone significant extensions including the 1977 linking to the western railway system at the Turkish border, the 1993 opening of the Bandar Abbas line providing better access to the sea, and the 1996 opening of the Mashad–Sarakhs extension as part of the Silk Road railway to link to the landlocked Central Asian Countries.

== Railway construction ==
Start	End	Length in km	Start	End
of Route		Length in km	of Construction	
Tehran	Ray	9	1884	1886
Mahmudabad	Amol	16	1882	1887
Tehran	Karaj	41	1895	1903
Tabriz	Jolfa	148	1912	1916
Sufian	Sharafkhaneh	53	1913	1916
Zahedan	Mirjaveh	94	1920	1921
Tehran	Bandar Torkaman	461	1928	1938
Tehran	Bandar Šâhpur	928	1928	1939
Ahvaz	Khorramshahr	121	1942	1943
Sar Bandar	Mahshahr	12	1950	1951
Garmsar	Mashhad	812	1938	1958
Tehran	Tabriz	736	1939	1959
Gorgan	Bandar Torkaman	35	1960	1961
Sufian	Razi	139	1912	1971
Qom	Zarand	847	1939	1971
Isfahan	Zarrin Shahr	111	1969	1972
Zarand	Kerman	80	1975	1979
Bafq	Bandar Abbas	626	1982	1995
Mashhad	Sarakhs	165	1993	1997
Aprin	Maleki	24	1993	1997
Badrud	Meibod	254	1996	1998
Chadormalu	Meibod	219	1992	1999
Mohammediya-2	Mohammediya-1	6	1994	1999
Aprin	Mohammediya-2	122	1994	1999
Rostamkola	Amir Abad Port	25	1996	2001
Kerman	Bam	225	1999	2002
Bafq	Torbat-e Heydarieh	800	1992	2004
Bam	Zahedan	546	2000	2009
Isfahan	Shiraz	506	2001	2009
Torbat-e Heydarieh	Khaf (Sangan Iron Mine)	146	2004	2010
Khorramshahr	Shalamcheh (Iraqi border)	16	2009	2012
Gorgan	Etrek	88	2009	2014
Tehran	Hamedan	268	2001	2017
Khaf	Shamtiq (Afghan border)	78	2007	2017
Arak	Kermanshah	267	2001	2018
Maragheh	Urmia	183	2003	2018
Qazvin	Rasht	164	2006	2018
Yazd	Eqlid	271	2015	2021
Zahedan	Khash	155	2013	2022
Hamedan	Sanandaj	151	2006	2023
Rasht	Caspian	37	2006	2024
Mianeh	Ardabil	174	2005	2026
