= Queensland Railways 1450 class =

Australian diesel-electric locomotives

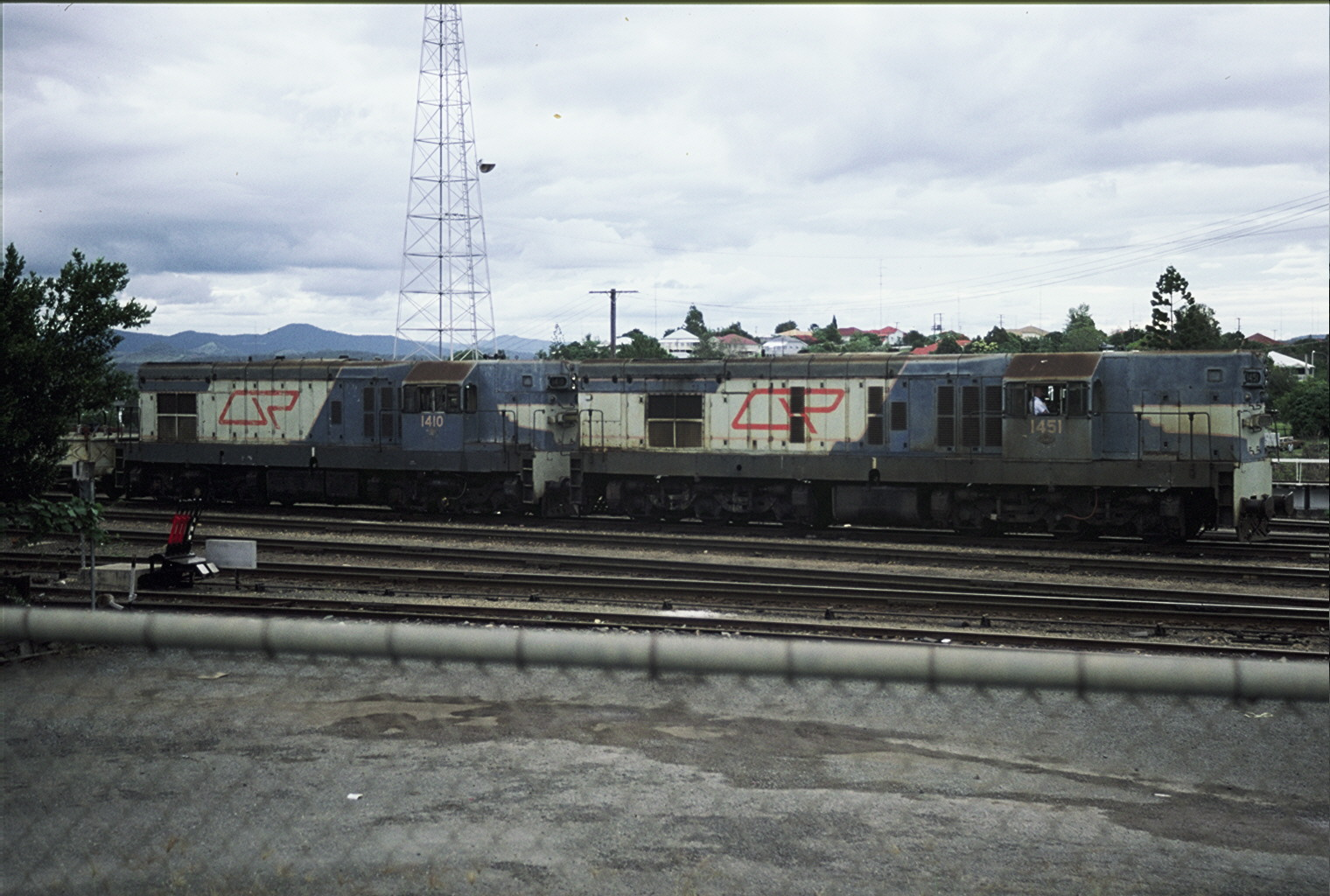
- 1451 & 1410 at Gympie in 1987
Type and origin
- Power type: Diesel-electric
- Builder: Clyde Engineering, Granville
- Model: EMD G12
- Build date: 1957–1958
- Total produced: 10
Specifications
- Configuration
  - UIC: Co-Co
- Gauge: 1,067 mm (3 ft 6 in)
- Length: 16.06 m (52 ft 8 in)
- Loco weight: 91.8 t (90.4 long tons; 101.2 short tons)
- Fuel type: Diesel
- Prime mover: EMD 12-567C
- Generator: EMD D12
- Traction motors: EMD D19
Performance figures
- Tractive effort: 977 kW (1,310 hp)
Career
- Operators: Queensland Railways
- Number in class: 10
- Numbers: 1450–1459
- Delivered: November 1957
- Preserved: 1450, 1455, 1459
- Disposition: 3 preserved, 7 scrapped

The 1450 class was a class of diesel locomotive built by Clyde Engineering, Granville for Queensland Railways in 1957–1958.

== History ==
The 1450 class was an evolution of the 1400 class, being built as a Co-Co instead of an A1A-A1A. This increased the weight by 14 tonnes (13.8 long tons; 15.4 short tons) but improved the tractive effort. They mainly operated in South East Queensland. To accommodate the Co-Co bogies, the unit was lengthened on both ends. The Sarmiento Railway in Argentina operated similarly lengthened G12s, officially designated the GR12. The South American units differed from the Australian ones in having only the No. 1 end hood lengthened. The first was withdrawn in December 1986. Three have been preserved by Queensland Rail's Heritage Division, and are stored at Workshops Rail Museum, North Ipswich:

== Status table ==
Number	Serial number	In service	Withdrawn	Scrapped	Notes
1450	57-172	22 November 1957	20 March 1987		Preserved
1451	57-176	27 August 1959	16 November 1987	December 1989	
1452	57-177	21 September 1959	12 October 1980	September 1985	
1453	57-178	4 November 1959	24 September 1987	December 1989	
1454	57-180	30 December 1959	3 November 1987	December 1989	
1455	57-181	4 September 1960	6 November 1987		Preserved
1456	58-183				
1457	58-184				
1458	58-185	15 December 1960	5 November 1987	December 1990	
1459	58-186				Preserved
