= Queensland Railways 1400 class =

Australian A1A-A1A locomotives

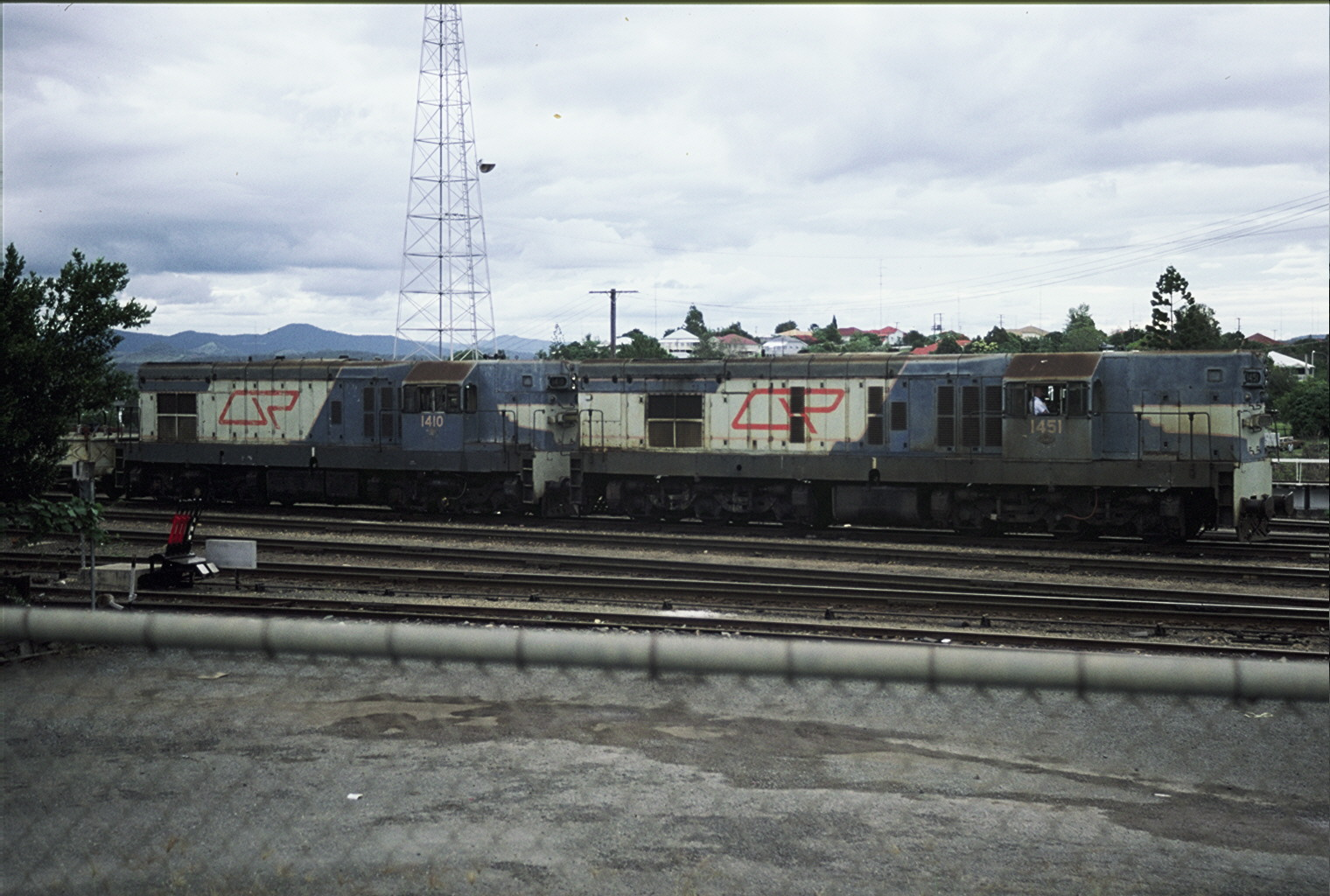
- 1451 & 1410 at Gympie in 1987
Type and origin
- Power type: Diesel-electric
- Builder: Clyde Engineering, Granville
- Model: EMD G12
- Build date: 1955–1957
- Total produced: 13
Specifications
- Configuration
  - UIC: A1A-A1A
- Gauge: 1,067 mm (3 ft 6 in)
- Length: 14.59 m (47 ft 10 in)
- Loco weight: 77.5 t (76.3 long tons; 85.4 short tons)
- Fuel type: Diesel
- Prime mover: EMD 12-567C
- Generator: EMD D12
- Traction motors: EMD D19
Performance figures
- Maximum speed: 80 km/h (50 mph)
- Tractive effort: 977 kW (1,310 hp)
Career
- Operators: Queensland Railways
- Number in class: 13
- Numbers: 1400–1412
- Delivered: May 1955
- Preserved: 1400, 1407
- Disposition: 2 preserved, 11 scrapped

The 1400 class was a class of diesel locomotive built by Clyde Engineering, Granville for Queensland Railways between 1955 and 1957.

== History ==
In 1955, Clyde Engineering demonstrated an Electro-Motive Diesel G12 locomotive to Queensland Railways who purchased it along with two other demonstrators under construction, and also placed an order for a further 10. The first three were initially numbered 1230–1232, before being reclassified as the 1400 class. When built, they were tested on standard gauge with Bo-Bo bogies, and received their A1A-A1A bogies upon arrival in Queensland. The demonstrators differ from the production series in placement of the number boxes and marker lights on the ends of the unit.

They are similar in appearance to the NZR DA class, first-series Victorian Railways T class and the Kowloon-Canton Railway Class 51 (later the CFCLA TL class), and mainly operated in South East Queensland. The first was withdrawn in December 1986.

Two have been preserved:

- 1400 (ex-1230) Mackay Heritage Railway
- 1407 Queensland Rail Heritage Division, stored at Workshops Rail Museum, North Ipswich

The 1450 class is a Co-Co version of the G12, lengthened on both ends to accommodate the bogies.
