= Tehran–Rey Railway =

Historic railway line in Iran

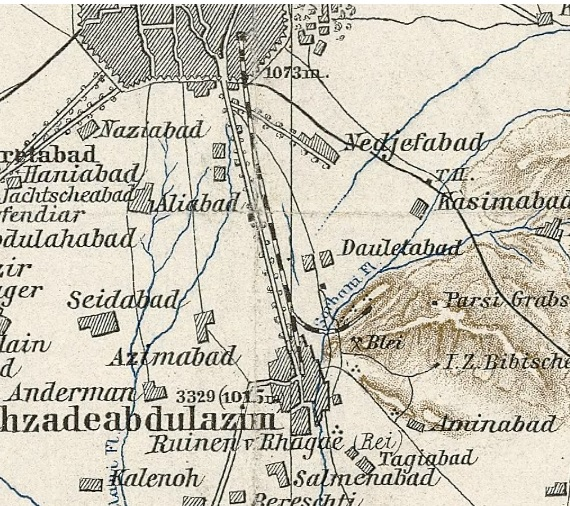
Map of the Tehran–Shah Abdol-Azim Railway in 1900

The narrow-gauge railway Tehran – Rey, which started its operation in 1888, is Iran's first railway line. Initially planned as a horse-drawn railway, it was operated as the Decauville railway with steam locomotives. Railway operations were stopped in 1962. Today a metro line connects Tehran with Rey.

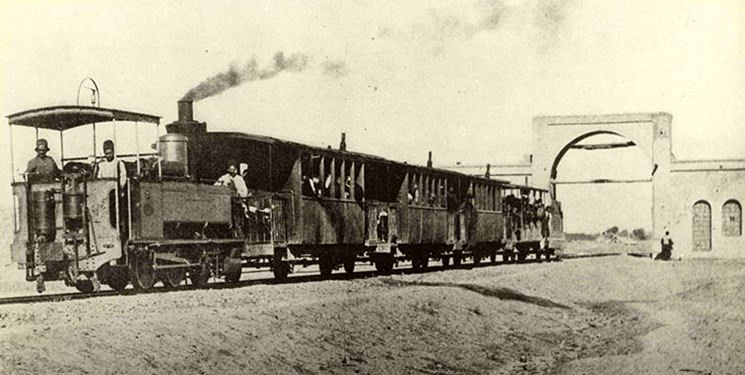
Narrow-gauge railway Tehran – Rey

== Horse-drawn tram ==
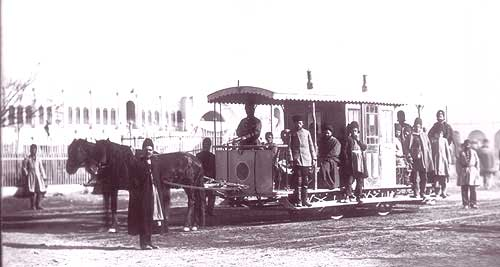
First horse-drawn tram in Tehran, c. 1880

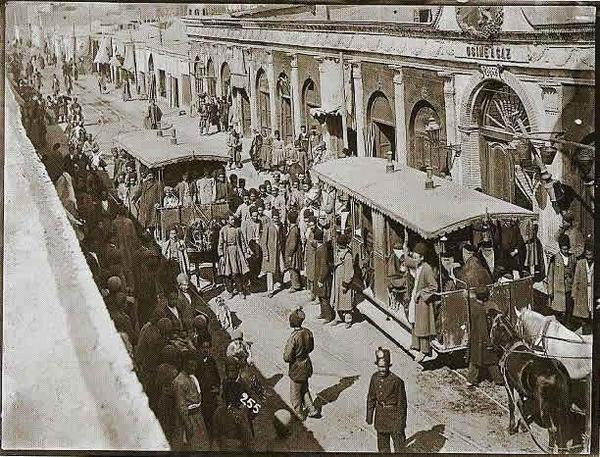
Horse-drawn tram stop in Tehran, c. 1890

In January 1859, an Iranian delegation travelled to Vienna on behalf of Naser al-Din Shah Qajar to conclude a consular treaty between Tehran and Vienna and to recruit talented craftsmen and engineers for the industrialisation of Iran. Prime Minister Amir Kabir had started his reform and industrialisation programs and founded Dar ol-Fonun in 1851, the first technical university in Iran based on the western model. The Austro-Hungarian railway engineer, Albert Joseph Gasteiger, Freiherr von Ravenstein and Kobach, was approached and enthusiastically accepted the order to build a railway in Iran. He learned Persian at the Imperial and Royal Polytechnic Institute in Vienna in 6 months, and then left Vienna on 17 July 1860 and reached Tehran on 30 September. When he arrived at Tehran, he quickly realised that he had been mistaken in his opinion about the culture of the Persians. "In Europe at that time people still believed to find a country from the Arabian Nights here, but in reality it was a broken state that was completely devastated." This was due to the apparent disinterest of the Qajar rulers to develop the country and instead only think about increasing their own wealth. In February 1861, Gasteiger began surveying a horse-drawn tram from Tehran to Shah Abdol-Azim Shrine in Rey, nine kilometers away, a much-visited place of pilgrimage. He calculated the cost of building the railway with a deployment of 1,000 men and a construction period of three months at 18,000 tomans. Gasteiger hadn't expected what would happen next. "A senior Persian official clapped his hands over his head and said that he had undoubtedly miscalculated and that the cost would have to be 30,000 tomans, otherwise it would be preferable to abandon the whole thing." Gasteiger remained steadfast in his calculations and refused to include the bribes for the court official in his calculations, and so the railroad project was put on hold for the next 25 years.

== Concession and construction of the railway ==
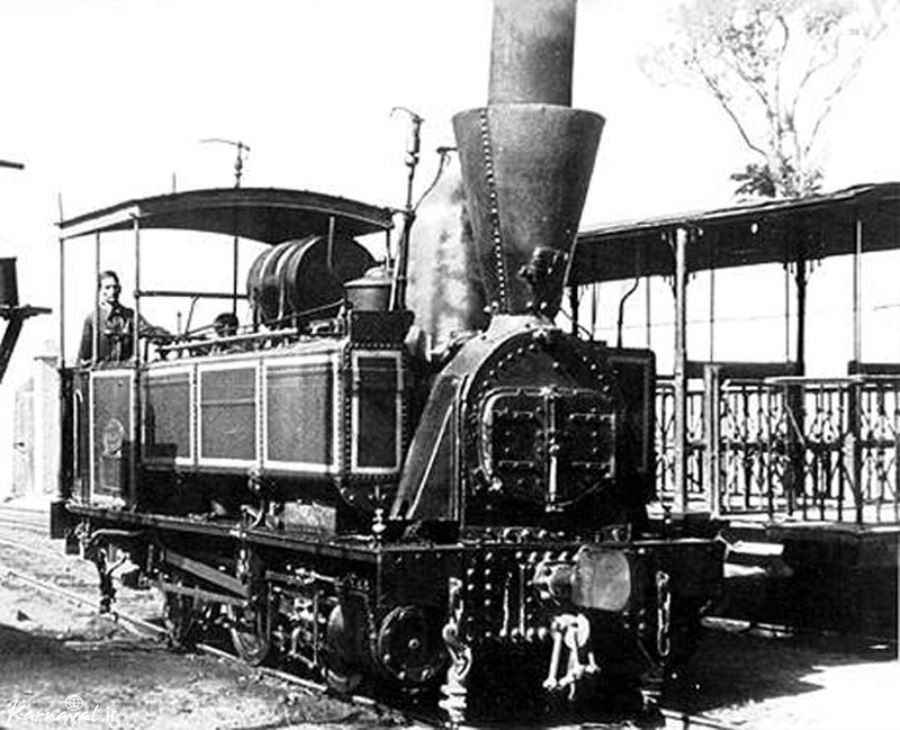
First steam-powered locomotive on the narrow-gauge railway from Tehran to Rey - in service

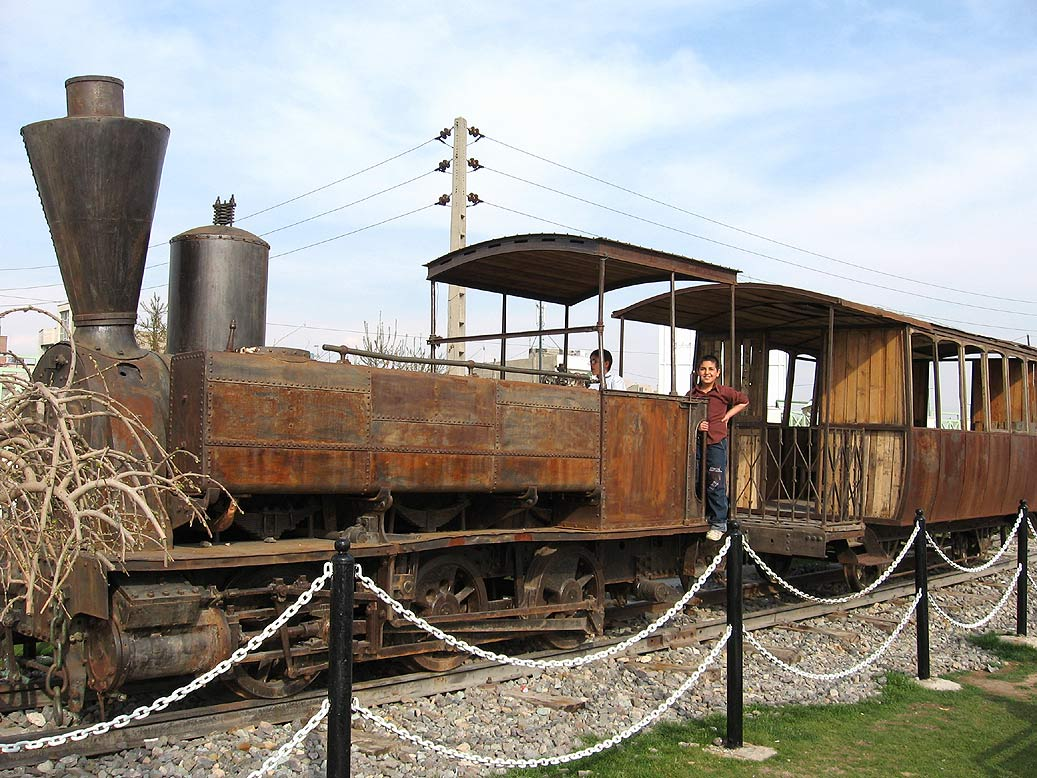
Current condition of the railway locomotive

In December 1886, the project was offered to the French engineer Fabius Boital, who first signed a concession agreement with Naser al-Din Shah for the construction and operation of a steam-powered Decauville narrow-gauge railway. The Shah's court had meanwhile come to the conclusion that it would be much more convenient, instead of developing industry and business themselves, to conclude concession agreements with foreign companies and to concentrate on collecting concession income. Boital monetised the concession, which included the right to build and operate railroads throughout Iran for 99 years, and sold it to the Belgian entrepreneur Edouard Otlet, that his son Paul Otlet, became known as the founder of modern information science. Edouard Otlet founded the Société Anonyme des Chemins de Fer et Tramways en Perse on 17 May 1887 with a share capital of 2 million francs.

Edouard Otlet had started building and operating private railways across Europe. On 20 May 1876, he received the order from King Ludwig II of Bavaria to build a horse-drawn railway in Munich. In 1878, Otlet founded the Belgian Sociéte Anonyme des Tramways de Munich for this purpose. Only after much back and forth did the Munich magistrate decide to apply for Otlet and grant him a 30-year license. He then had to pay 1% of his gross income to the municipality for the use of urban roadside. After a dispute with the Munich city council, Otlet was forced to sell his company to the German Münchener Trambahn-Aktiengesellschaft (MTAG) in the same year, which later became the Munich Municipal Transport Company.

== Railway operation ==
In Iran, Otlet expected high profits. Since about 300,000 pilgrims visited the Shrine of Abdol-Azim annually, it seemed obvious to start building this route. A track width of 800 mm was chosen and a single-track stretch was laid from the Tehran bazaar to near the shrine in Rey. In Tehran, a small train station (fa) was built with three waiting rooms, one for men and one for women, with a hall in between for the Shah. The line was completed on 31 May 1888, and rail operations began in July 1888. [5] The railway staff consisted of 5 European and 60 Persian employees. The locals called the railway mashin doodi (smoke machine) and the station gar mashin' after the French gare'. Instead of using the train, the pilgrims preferred to walk the 9 kilometers from Tehran to Rey as before, so that the whole enterprise became a financial disaster. The Belgian managing directors complained to Naser al-Din Shah and persuaded him to demonstratively take the train together with high court and military officials. As he was ultimately involved in the income of the railway through the concession, he agreed. Naser al-Din Shah's advertising tour was initially a complete success and the railway finally found the popularity expected by the investors. However, some pilgrim accidents and a mullah who died on the railway were soon to provoke the anger of the clergy. The railway was denigrated as "satanic" and its use demonised. For the Belgians, the investment did not pay off and they decided not to build further lines. Only with Reza Shah was the large scale construction of new railway lines resumed. The Trans-Iranian Railway, built during his reign, brought about the breakthrough for a rail-based transport system in Iran. From 1901, the train from Tehran to Rey no longer ran on a regular schedule. In 1962, rail operations were finally stopped.

== See also ==
- Railway in Iran
- Tehran Metro

== Literature ==
- Baron E. Beyens: Commerce et industrie de la Perse, Brüssel, 1898
- Moḥammad Ḥassan Ḵān Etemād al-Salṭana Ṣaniʿ al-Dowla Marāgaʾi: Ruznāma-ye ḵ-āṭerāt-e Eʿtemād al-Salṭana, ed. F. Sarāmad, Teheran, 1991
- Albert Houtum-Schindler: Persia, Encyclopaedia Britannica, XXXI, 1902 (10. Ausg.), S. 617–627
- Moḥammad ʿAli Jamālzāda, Ganj-e šāyegān: Awzaʿ-e eqteṣādi-e Irān, neue Ausg., Teheran, 1997
- Ḥosayn Maḥbubi Ardakāni: Tāriḵ-e moʾassesāt-e tamaddoni-e jādid dar Irān, 3 Bände, Teheran, 1978
- L’Etoile Belge: Le premier chemin de fer en Perse, 7 June 1888
