= NS Class 2900 (1956) =

Dutch diesel locomotive

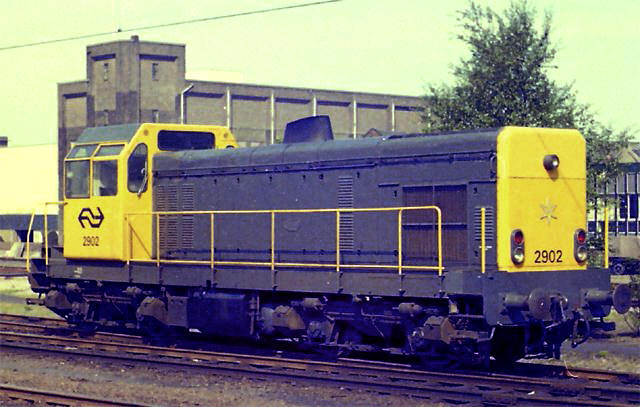
- NS 2902
Type and origin
- Power type: Diesel-electric
- Builder: Henschel & Son; Electro-Motive Division
- Build date: 1956-1959
- Total produced: 5
Specifications
- Configuration
  - UIC: Bo'Bo'
  - Commonwealth: Bo-Bo
- Gauge: 1,435 mm (4 ft 8 1/2 in)
- Wheel diameter: 1,000 mm (3 ft 3 in)
- Length
  - Over buffers: 14,370 mm (47 ft 2 in)
- Height: 4,130 mm (13 ft 7 in); 151: 4,330 mm (14 ft 2 in)
- Axle load: 18.5 t (18.2 long tons; 20.4 short tons)
- Loco weight: 74 t (73 long tons; 82 short tons)
- Fuel capacity: 3,028 L (666 imp gal; 800 US gal)
- Train brakes: Knorr
Performance figures
- Maximum speed: SM: 100 km/h (62 mph); NS: 80 km/h (50 mph)
Career
- Operators: Staatsmijnen in Limburg; Nederlandse Spoorwegen; Ferrocarriles de Vía Estrecha
- Numbers: SM: 151-155; NS: 2901-2905; FEVE: 1421-1425
- Withdrawn: 1970-1971 (SM); 1975 (NS); 1982 (FEVE)

The NS locomotive series 2900 is a small series of five diesel-electric locomotives that were used by the Dutch Railways between 1970 and 1974. They were taken over by the NS from the State Mines in 1970. In 1975 they were sold to FEVE in Spain. They were built in 1956–1959 by Henschel & Son in Kassel under license from the Electro-Motive Division (EMD).

== History ==
=== State Mines ===
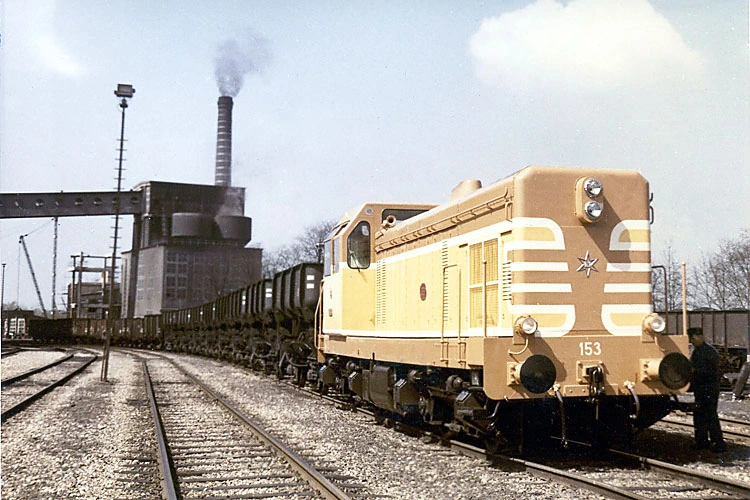
SM 153 in Hoensbroek (1958)

Following a demonstration in 1955 with a diesel locomotive G12 7707 built by General Motors and Electro-Motive Division in various European countries, including the Netherlands, the State Mines placed an order for five locomotives. The locomotives were built in 1956–1959 by Henschel & Son, since 1957 called Henschel-Werke, in Kassel under license from the Electro-Motive Division (EMD), part of General Motors. EMD built the diesel engines, the traction engines were supplied by Smit Slikkerveerbuilt on an example of EMD. The locomotives were technically identical to the type G12 of EMD. Externally, the locomotives differed by a higher cab and extra windows for better all-round visibility. The first locomotive was ordered on 1955, the State Mines numbered the locomotives 151–155. The 151 was also the first GM locomotive built under license by Henschel and was presented on 1956 at the transport exhibition in Hanover. The 151 entered service on 1956. The 152–155 were delivered to the State Mines in 1958 and 1959. The 151 had a higher cab than the other four locomotives. The five locomotives each got a different color, with the pattern of the painting matching. The 151 was blue, the 152 green, the 153 orange, the 154 red, and the 155 grey. Until 1970 (the 155 until 1971) they were used for pulling coal trains over the mining track Staatsmijn Maurits - Staatsmijn Hendrik, from the mines in Brunssum and Hoensbroek to Nuth and the harbor in Stein.

=== Dutch Railways ===
Due to the closure of the mines, the locomotives became superfluous and were subsequently sold to the Dutch Railways, which could put them to good use due to the growth in train traffic. In the same period, the British Rail Class 1500 locomotives were also taken over. The NS divided the locomotives into the series 2900. This was also the first series of diesel locomotives in the new grey-yellow paint style. Drivers who were used to a weaker NS 2200 in terms of engine power sometimes experienced wheel slip when switching on.

They only served for more than four years with the NS, mainly from Zwolle. Due to the reorganization of freight transport (including closure of various freight railway lines), fewer locomotives were needed after a few years and the small series 2900, which also had many breakdowns, was taken out of service in 1975.

=== Ferrocarriles de Vía Estrecha ===
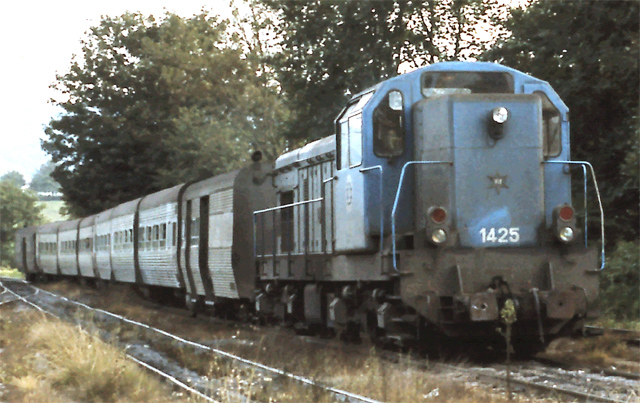
FEVE 1425 with Talgo coaches.

In the same year, 1975, they were sold to Spain where they served with the Ferrocarriles de Vía Estrecha (FEVE) in a blue livery and with the numbers 1421–1425 on the railway line between Gijón and Lagreo/Laviana. After this railway was converted to narrow gauge with a gauge of 1000 mm in 1982, the 1421–1425 were taken out of service and scrapped.

== Summary ==
2900 Class Diesel Locomotives
Image	Factory Number	SM number	Construction Year	Color (SM)	NS number	FEVE number	Notes
	29100	151	1956	blue	2901	1421	seduced cab; higher roof than later models
	29162	152	1958	green	2902	1422	seduced cab
	29163	153	1958	orange	2903	1423	seduced cab
	29637	154	1959	red	2904	1424	seduced cab
	29638	155	1959	grey	2905	1425	seduced cab

== See also ==
- EMD G12
