= Patricia Matrai =

Marine scientist

- Education: University of California, San Diego
- Scientific career
- Thesis: Phytoplankton production of organic sulfur in the ocean surface waters (1988)

Patricia Ana Matrai is a marine scientist known for her work on the cycling of sulfur. She is a senior research scientist at Bigelow Laboratory for Ocean Sciences.

== Education and career ==
Matrai is originally from Chile. Matria has a B.A. from the Universidad de Concepción (1981), an M.S. (1984) and a Ph.D. (1988) from Scripps Institution of Oceanography and the University of California San Diego. Following her Ph.D. she moved to the University of Miami. She became a senior research scientist at Bigelow Laboratory for Ocean Sciences in 1995.

== Research ==
Matrai is known for her work on marine aerosols, especially those that contain sulfur. She has examined the production of sulfur compounds by coccolithophores, a type of phytoplankton. She has also examined the amount of organic sulfur inside phytoplankton cells and during phytoplankton blooms. Matrai has worked on the impact of declines in sea ice and how primary production is measured in the Arctic. In 2001 she went to the North Pole on an icebreaker where she studied aerosols produced by phytoplankton. She also does work on outreach and mentoring children to introduce them to science

== Selected publications ==
- Kettle, A. J.; Andreae, M. O.; Amouroux, D.; Andreae, T. W.; Bates, T. S.; Berresheim, H.; Bingemer, H.; Boniforti, R.; Curran, M. A. J.; DiTullio, G. R.; Helas, G.; Jones, G. B.; Keller, M. D.; Kiene, R. P.; Leck, C. (1999). "A global database of sea surface dimethylsulfide (DMS) measurements and a procedure to predict sea surface DMS as a function of latitude, longitude, and month". Global Biogeochemical Cycles. 13 (2): 399–444. Bibcode:1999GBioC..13..399K. doi:10.1029/1999GB900004. hdl:10261/275431. S2CID 131236036.
- Matrai, Patricia A.; Keller, Maureen D. (1993-08-01). "Dimethylsulfide in a large-scale coccolithophore bloom in the Gulf of Maine". Continental Shelf Research. 13 (8): 831–843. Bibcode:1993CSR....13..831M. doi:10.1016/0278-4343(93)90012-M. ISSN 0278-4343.
- Matrai, P. A.; Keller, M. D. (1994). "Total organic sulfur and dimethylsulfoniopropionate in marine phytoplankton: intracellular variations". Marine Biology. 119 (1): 61–68. Bibcode:1994MarBi.119...61M. doi:10.1007/BF00350107. ISSN 0025-3162. S2CID 85286768.
- Codispoti, L. A.; Kelly, V.; Thessen, A.; Matrai, P.; Suttles, S.; Hill, V.; Steele, M.; Light, B. (2013-03-01). "Synthesis of primary production in the Arctic Ocean: III. Nitrate and phosphate based estimates of net community production". Progress in Oceanography. 110: 126–150. Bibcode:2013PrOce.110..126C. doi:10.1016/j.pocean.2012.11.006. ISSN 0079-6611.
- Matrai, Patricia A.; Vernet, María (1997-10-15). "Dynamics of the vernal bloom in the marginal ice zone of the Barents Sea: Dimethyl sulfide and dimethylsulfoniopropionate budgets". Journal of Geophysical Research: Oceans. 102 (C10): 22965–22979. Bibcode:1997JGR...10222965M. doi:10.1029/96JC03870.

== Awards and honors ==
In 2017, Matrai was named a fellow of the Association for the Sciences of Limnology and Oceanography.
